= Sappho 96 =

Fragment of a poem by Sappho

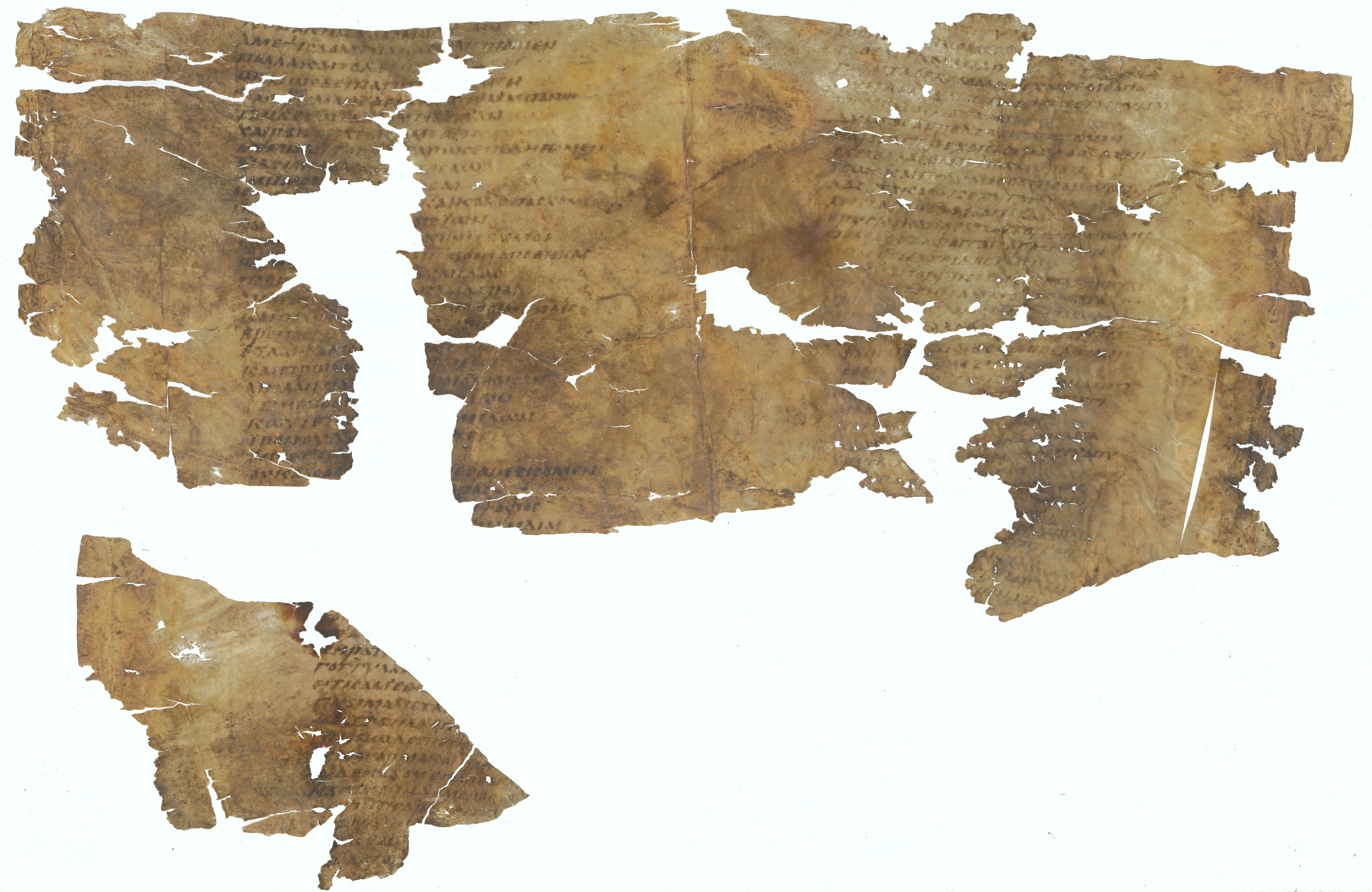
P. Berol. 9722, the parchment on which Sappho 96 is preserved.

Sappho 96 (Note: Sappho's fragments are conventionally identified by number. Modern scholarship uses the numbering system from Eva-Maria Voigt's 1971 edition of the works of Sappho and Alcaeus, which itself follows with minor variations the numbering used by Edgar Lobel and Denys Page in their 1955 edition.) is a fragment of poetry by the archaic Greek lyric poet Sappho. 37 lines of the fragment are preserved on a 6th-century parchment. The first twenty lines describe an imaginary scene in which an unnamed woman is struck by grief remembering an absent companion, Atthis; the remaining 17 lines, possibly originally a separate poem, reflects more generally on the foolishness of trying to compare human and divine beauty. As with other poems by Sappho such as poem 16 and 94, memory is a major theme.

== Preservation ==
The poem was one of a group (Sappho 92–97) preserved on a parchment, P. Berol. 9722, found in Egypt. It was originally part of a book created in the sixth century AD. The parchment is 12 cm high (though the page was originally about twice this height) and 43.5 cm wide, and consists of a double-page spread with a third page sewn to the right hand side. It is part of the collection of the Egyptian Museum of Berlin, which acquired it in 1896, a gift of a Dr Reinhardt, then the German vice-consul in Bushehr. The first twenty lines were first published by Wilhelm Schubart in 1902; the remainder was first published by Edgar Lobel in 1925.

The extant text begins in the middle of a stanza, and it is uncertain how many lines preceded the surviving portion. 37 lines are preserved or partially preserved. Sappho 96 may be made up of two poems, with the first ending at line 20 and the second beginning at the next line of the fragment. André Lardinois argues that parallels between lines 4–5 and 21, and the repetition of stanzas ending with mentions of gods at lines 8, 26, and 29, suggest Sappho 96 is a single long poem; while Gregory Hutchinson thinks that a new poem probably began at line 21, as that stanza would not make sense as a continuation of the first part of the fragment. Patrick Finglass argues in favour of the poem division between lines 20 and 21, and further suggests that line 33 might begin a third new poem.

== Poem ==
The poem is composed in three-line stanzas based on glyconic cola, made up of a creticus, three glyconics, and a bacchius, the same metre as Sappho 95. Though written over three lines, these stanzas are made up of a single verse without a metrical break, in several cases with words split over two lines. Based on its meter, the poem was probably included in the fifth book of the Alexandrian edition of Sappho's poetry. Sappho 96 was likely composed to be sung by a chorus.

The first seven stanzas of Sappho 96 describe an imaginary scene of a Lydian woman remembering Atthis (Note: Atthis was one of the three "companions and friends" of Sappho listed by the Suda. As well as Sappho 96, she is mentioned in fragments 8, 49, 131, 214C Campbell, and inc. auc. 31.) and being struck by grief. The poem is addressed to an unnamed "you", probably Atthis. Some scholars, starting with Wilamowitz, have reconstructed lines 4–5 as naming the Lydian girl "Arignota"; alternatively the name might be in the vocative, in which case Arignota would instead be the addressee of the poem. The remainder of the fragment discusses more generally the foolishness of attempting to compare human and divine beauty.

As in Sappho 16 and Sappho 94, memory is a major theme of fragment 96. The setting and the emotion of the poem are both similar to Sappho 94, though unlike Sappho 94, which focuses on the relationship between the narrator and the woman who has left, in this poem the focus is on the relationship of the woman who has left with the others who have been left.

Much of the surviving text of the poem is occupied by an extended simile which compares the Lydian woman to the "rosy-fingered moon". This is an adaptation of the common Homeric epithet "rosy-fingered Dawn". Margaret Williamson interprets this metaphor as presenting the Lydian woman as a goddess.

== Works cited ==
- Battezzato, Luigi (2021). "Sappho's Metres and Music". In Finglass, P. J.; Kelly, Adrian (eds.). The Cambridge Companion to Sappho. Cambridge: Cambridge University Press. ISBN 978-1-316-63877-4.
- Burnett, Anne Pippin (1983). Three Archaic Poets: Archilochus, Alcaeus, Sappho. Bloomsbury Academic.
- "Berliner Papyrusdatenbank" (in German). Staatlichten Museen der Berlin.
- Finglass, Patrick (2026). "Poem-Division in Sappho's Papyrus Fragments". Hyperboreus. 32 (1). doi:10.36950/hyperboreus.v32p1a01.
- Hutchinson, G. O. (2001). Greek Lyric Poetry: A Commentary on Selected Larger Pieces. Oxford: Oxford University Press. ISBN 0-19-924017-5.
- Lardinois, André (1996). "Who Sang Sappho's Songs?". Reading Sappho: Contemporary Approaches. Berkeley: University of California Press.
- McLachlan, Bonnie (1997). "Sappho". In Gerber, Douglas E. (ed.). A Companion to Greek Lyric Poets. Leiden: Brill.
- Rayor, Diane; Lardinois, André (2014). Sappho: A New Translation of the Complete Works. Cambridge: Cambridge University Press. ISBN 978-1-107-02359-8.
- Robbins, Emmet (1990). "Who's Dying in Sappho Fr. 94?". Phoenix. 44 (2): 111–121. doi:10.2307/1088325. JSTOR 1088325.
- Schubart, W. (1902). "Neue Bruchstüke der Sappho und des Alkaios". Sitzungberichte der Königlich Preussischen Akademie der Wissenschaften zu Berlin (in German). 10.
- Snyder, Jane McIntosh (1997). Lesbian Desire in the Lyrics of Sappho. New York: Columbia University Press. ISBN 0-231-09994-0.
- Tsantsanoglou, Kyriakos (2020). "The 'Cycle' of Arignota: Sappho's frr. 95 and 96". Trends in Classics. 12 (2): 203–227. doi:10.1515/tc-2020-0015. S2CID 227218234.
- Voigt, Eva-Maria, ed. (1971). Sappho et Alcaeus: Fragmenta (in Latin). Amsterdam: Polak & Van Gennep.
- Williamson, Margaret (1995). Sappho's Immortal Daughters. Cambridge: Harvard University Press. ISBN 978-0-674-78912-8.
