= Marguerite Johnson =

Marguerite Johnson may refer to:

- Marguerite Johnson (classicist) (1965–2026), scholar of ancient Greek and Latin literature
- Maya Angelou (1928–2014), born Marguerite Annie Johnson, American memoirist, essayist, poet, and civil rights activist
