= Marguerite Annie Johnson =

Marguerite Johnson may refer to:

- Maya Angelou, born Marguerite Annie Johnson (1928-2014)
- Marguerite Johnson (Classicist) (1965-2026)
