= Sappho 2 =

Poem written by Sappho

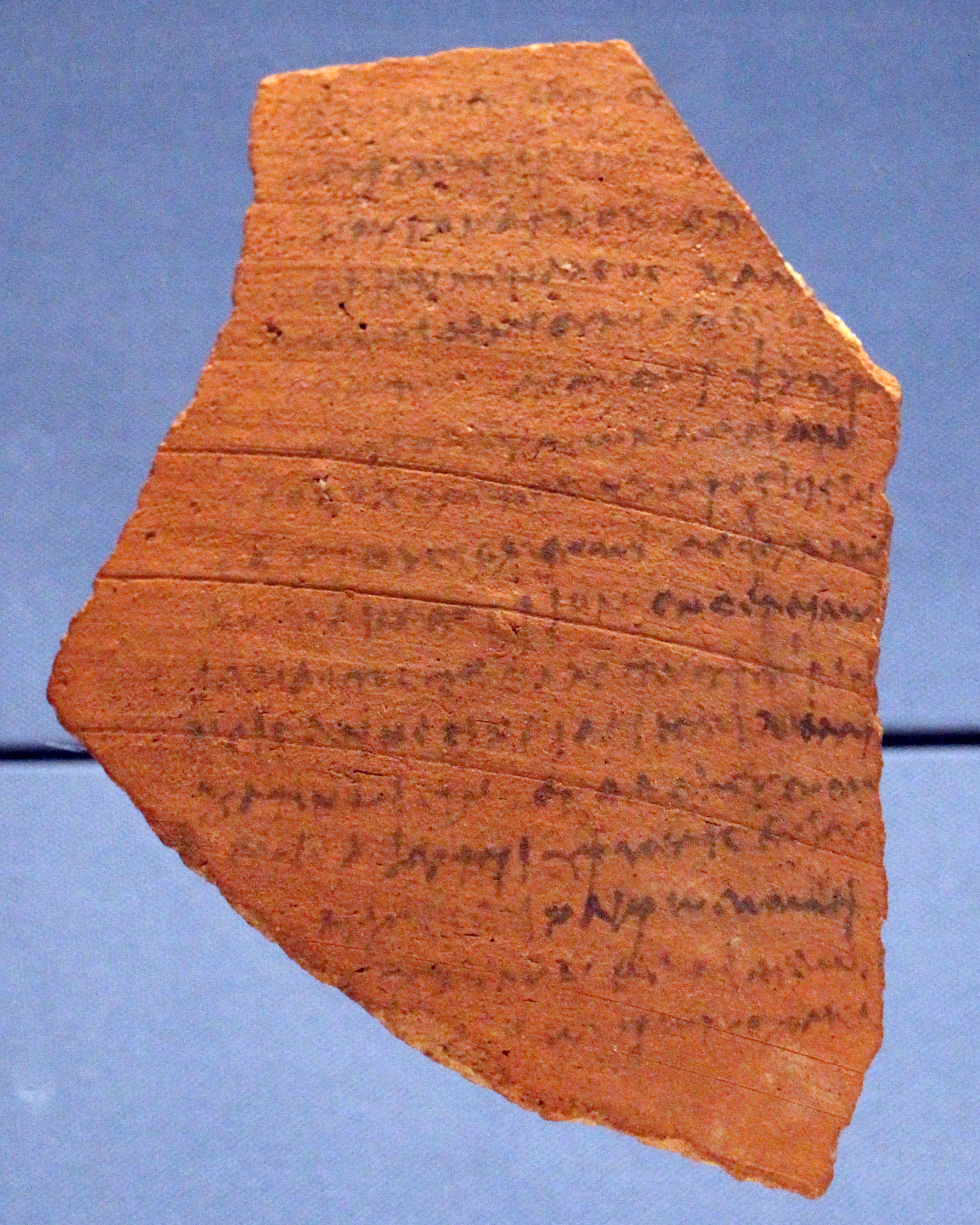
The Florentine ostrakon, the potsherd on which Sappho 2 is most completely preserved

Sappho 2 is a fragment of a poem by the archaic Greek lyric poet Sappho. In antiquity it was part of Book I of the Alexandrian edition of Sappho's poetry. Sixteen lines of the poem survive, preserved on a potsherd discovered in Egypt and first published in 1937 by Medea Norsa. It is in the form of a hymn to the goddess Aphrodite, summoning her to appear in a temple in an apple grove. The majority of the poem is made up of an extended description of the sacred grove to which Aphrodite is being summoned.

== Preservation ==
Before the year 1937, only two strophes of the poem survived, both quoted in other ancient authors. Hermogenes of Tarsus quotes part of the second strophe in his work Kinds of Style (Peri Ideon), and Athenaeus quotes from the fourth stanza in the Scholars at Dinner (Deipnosophistae). In 1937, the Italian papyrologist Medea Norsa published an ostrakon which preserves four stanzas of the poem. The ostrakon (PSI XIII.1300) was discovered in Egypt, and is now in the collection of the Biblioteca Laurenziana in Florence.

The Florentine ostrakon dates from the mid-third or second century BC, which makes it one of the oldest surviving fragments of Sappho's poetry. The handwriting is good, indicating that it was written by a professional scribe, but the text is full of errors – to the point that the Greek does not make sense in places. The ostrakon was most likely either copied by a private enthusiast unfamiliar with the Aeolic dialect used by Sappho, or produced as part of a school exercise.

== Poem ==
The first book of the Alexandrian edition of Sappho's poetry, from which Sappho 2 comes, was made up of poems composed in Sapphic stanzas. The metre is made up of stanzas of four lines, three longer lines followed by a single shorter line. Four stanzas in this metre survive; it is uncertain whether the poem was originally longer. The Florentine ostrakon begins with a partial line which reads "coming down from" ("ρανοθεν κατιου["). This is generally considered not to have been part of Sappho 2: it is followed by a larger blank space than the other strophe ends on the potsherd, suggesting that it is part of a different text. Additionally, κατιου is not in Sappho's Aeolic dialect, and the most likely restoration of the line is unmetrical for a poem in Sapphic stanzas.

The poem is in the form of a hymn to the goddess Aphrodite, invoking her and asking her to appear. In the form which it is preserved on the Florentine ostrakon, it seems to begin unusually abruptly – normally such a hymn would begin with a mention of the god being called upon. This may be a deliberate stylistic choice by Sappho, rather than evidence that the poem is incomplete: at least one other archaic hymn – Anacreon 12 (Page) – also withholds the name of the god being invoked until the final line. Thomas McEvilley argues that Aphrodite's name is withheld in order to build tension.

The first three stanzas of the poem consist of an extended description of the sanctuary to which Aphrodite is being summoned. This ekphrasis of a natural scene is unusual in archaic Greek literature. The description makes repeated reference to attributes of Aphrodite: apples, roses, spring flowers, meadows, and horses are all linked to her. Spring flowers are linked to Aphrodite in the Cypria, a poem from the Epic Cycle, where crocuses, hyacinths, violets, roses, narcissi, and lilies adorn her; girls ready for love are described as "horses of Aphrodite" in Anacreon, and a similar image is found in Theognis.

It is generally assumed that the sacred precinct described by Sappho in the poem is a real one which she knew, but there is no evidence for a temple to Aphrodite on Lesbos: McEvilley suggests that the location of the grove should be found in the "spiritual geography rather than physical". Alexander Turyn compares the sanctuary described by Sappho in fragment 2 to the ancient Greek image of paradise. The description of elysium in Pindar's fragment 129, for instance, has many elements in common with Sappho 2: "meadows of red roses", "frankincense trees", "god's altars" all have parallels in Sappho. However, McEvilley finds equivalent parallels in poems by Xenophanes and Theognis, neither of which describe paradise, and argues that "ritual, paradisal, and festal images overlap" in archaic Greek poetry, especially by Sappho. Other scholars have seen the description of the grove as a metaphor for female sexuality, such as John J. Winkler and Barbara Goff, who describes the drowsiness induced in it as "nothing short of postcoital".

The final surviving stanza of the poem describes Aphrodite pouring nectar "into golden cups". This is similar to a ritual described in Sappho 96, and may represent a real ritual in which the priestess, as Aphrodite, poured wine for celebrants.

In Athenaeus' Deipnosophistae, a version of the final stanza preserved on the Florentine ostrakon is followed by a line of prose which means "for these my friends and yours". These words may come from a later stanza of the same poem. As the words are in prose rather than Sappho's Aeolic dialect, and ungrammatical (four words are in the wrong gender) they are not from the poem as Sappho composed it. They are likely to have been composed by Athenaeus himself, rather than known to him from an earlier source; if they had been composed in a Classical Athenian sympotic context, for instance, Mark de Kreij argues that they would have fitted Sappho's metre better. It is possible but not certain that they are a paraphrase of Sappho's work by Athenaeus: at other points in the Deipnosophistae there are similar continuations of quotations which look like paraphrases but in fact do not appear in the source text – for instance, in his quotation of Apollonius Rhodius at Deipnosophistae 13.555b.

== Reception ==
In antiquity, Sappho 2 was apparently one of her best-known poems, comparable to the Ode to Aphrodite, the opening poem of the Alexandrian edition. Its description of Aphrodite's sacred grove was alluded to by the poet Horace in his Epodes (1st century BC), and by the theologian Gregory of Nazianus in the poem "On Human Nature" (3rd century AD). The fragment preserved on the Florentine ostrakon and Hermogenes' quotation of Sappho 2 both suggest that in antiquity it was used in an educational context.

== Works cited ==
- Campbell, D. A. (1982). Greek Lyric I: Sappho and Alcaeus. Cambridge, MA: Harvard University Press.
- de Kreij, Mark (2016). "Ουκ εστι Σαπφους τουτο το ασμα: Variants of Sappho's Songs in Athenaeus' Deipnosophistae". Journal of Hellenic Studies. 136: 59–72. doi:10.1017/S0075426916000057.
- Finglass, Patrick (2026). "Which Was Sappho's Best-Known Poem in Antiquity?". Mnemosyne. Advance articles: 1–18. doi:10.1163/1568525x-bja10413. hdl:1983/e39d0667-74e6-4c13-a205-30e1bb8972fc.
- Goff, Barbara (2004). Citizen Bacchae: Women's Ritual Practice in Ancient Greece. Berkeley: University of California Press.
- Lanata, Giuliana (1996). "Sappho's Amatory Language". In Greene, Ellen (ed.). Reading Sappho: Contemporary Approaches. Translated by Robins, William. Berkeley: University of California Press.
- Lidov, Joel (2016). "Songs for Sailors and Lovers". In Bierl, Anton; Lardinois, André (eds.). The Newest Sappho: P. Sapph. Obbink and P. GC inv. 105, frs.1–4. Leiden: Brill. pp. 55–109. doi:10.1163/9789004314832_005. ISBN 978-90-04-31483-2. S2CID 194406678.
- McEvilley, Thomas (1972). "Sappho, Fragment Two". Phoenix. 26 (4): 323–333. doi:10.2307/1087592. JSTOR 1087592.
- Rayor, Diane; Lardinois, André (2014). Sappho: A New Translation of the Complete Works. Cambridge: Cambridge University Press.
- Turyn, Alexander (1942). "The Sapphic Ostracon". Transactions and Proceedings of the American Philological Association. 73: 308–318. doi:10.2307/283553. JSTOR 283553.
- Williamson, Margaret (1995). Sappho's Immortal Daughters. Cambridge, MA: Harvard University Press.
- Winkler, John J. (1996). "Gardens of Nymphs: Public and Private in Sappho's Lyrics". In Greene, Ellen (ed.). Reading Sappho: Contemporary Approaches. Berkeley: University of California Press.
