= Gregory Hutchinson (classicist) =

British classicist and academic (born 1957)

Professor G. O. Hutchinson FBA
- Born: Gregory Owen Hutchinson; 5 December 1957 (age 68)
- Title: Regius Professor of Greek
- Spouse: Yvonne Downing (m. 1979)
- Children: One

Academic background
- Education: City of London School
- Alma mater: Balliol College, Oxford
- Thesis: "Aeschylus' Septem Contra Thebas: Text and commentary" (1983)

Academic work
- Discipline: Classics
- Sub-discipline: Ancient Greek literature Latin literature
- Institutions: Christ Church, Oxford; Exeter College, Oxford; Faculty of Classics, University of Oxford
- Doctoral students: William Allan, Patrick Finglass

Gregory Owen Hutchinson (born 5 December 1957), known as G. O. Hutchinson, is a British classicist and academic, specialising in Latin literature, Ancient Greek literature, and Latin and Ancient Greek languages. Between 2015 and his retirement in 2023, he was the Regius Professor of Greek at the University of Oxford, and a Student (i.e. Fellow) of Christ Church, Oxford.

== Early life and education ==
Hutchinson was born on 5 December 1957 in Hackney, London, England. He was educated at the City of London School, an all-boys private school in the City of London; he had been granted one of the free places funded by the Inner London Education Authority. He studied classics at Balliol College, Oxford, graduating with a Bachelor of Arts (BA) degree in 1979. He remained at Balliol to undertake postgraduate research and completed his Doctor of Philosophy (DPhil) degree in 1983. His doctoral thesis was titled "Aeschylus' Septem Contra Thebas: Text and commentary".

== Academic career ==
From 1981 to 1984, while a postgraduate student, Hutchinson was also a research lecturer at Christ Church, Oxford. In 1984, he was elected a Fellow of Exeter College, Oxford. He was then a Tutor in classics at Exeter between 1984 and 2015. From 1996 to 1998, he was also Reader in Classical Literature in the Faculty of Classics. From 1998 to 2015, he was also Professor of Greek and Latin Languages and Literature at the University of Oxford.

In June 2015, Hutchinson was named as the next Regius Professor of Greek at Oxford following the retirement of Christopher Pelling, FBA, earlier in the year. He took up the appointment on 1 October 2015 and moved colleges to become a Student (equivalent to a fellow) of Christ Church, Oxford. He retired in 2023.

Hutchinson's doctoral students at Oxford included William Allan and Patrick Finglass.

== Personal life ==
In 1979, Hutchinson married Yvonne Downing. Together they have one daughter.

== Selected works ==
- Hutchinson, G. O. (1988). Hellenistic poetry. Oxford: Clarendon Press. ISBN 978-0198140405.
- Hutchinson, G. O. (1992). Latin literature from Seneca to Juvenal: a critical study. Oxford: Clarendon Press. ISBN 978-0198146902.
- Hutchinson, G. O. (1998). Cicero's correspondence: a literary study. Oxford: Clarendon. ISBN 978-0198150664.
- Hutchinson, G. O. (2003). Greek lyric poetry: a commentary on selected larger pieces; Alcman, Stesichorus, Sappho, Alcaeus, Ibycus, Anacreon, Simonides, Bacchylides, Pindar, Sophocles, Euripides. Oxford: Oxford University Press. ISBN 978-0199240173.
- Hutchinson, G. O. (2008). Talking books: readings in Hellenistic and Roman books of poetry. Oxford: Oxford University Press. ISBN 978-0199279418.
- Hutchinson, G. O. (2013). Greek to Latin: frameworks and contexts for intertextuality. Oxford: Oxford University Press. ISBN 978-0199670703.
- Hutchinson, G. O. (2018). Plutarch's Rhythmic Prose. Oxford: Oxford University Press. ISBN 9780198821717

Academic offices
Preceded by Christopher Pelling	Regius Professor of Greek; University of Oxford; 2015 to 2023	Succeeded by Laura Swift
