= Marguerite Johnson (classicist) =

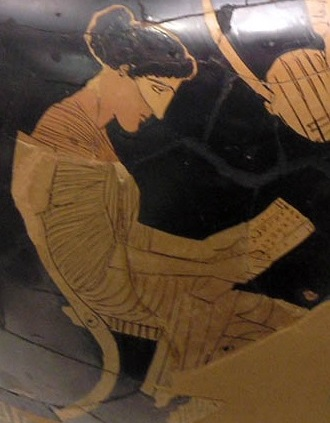
Detail of the Vari vase showing the poet Sappho reading. Held at the National Archaeological Museum, Athens

Marguerite Johnson ^{FAHA} (1965-2026) was a world-renowned scholar of ancient Greek and Latin literature, especially the Archaic poet Sappho. She was Professor Emerita of Classics and Ancient History at the University of Newcastle, and Honorary Professor at the University of Queensland. She was a Fellow of the Australian Academy of the Humanities.

== Education ==
Johnson received her PhD from the University of Newcastle in 1995. Her doctoral thesis was "O nimis optato saeclorum tempore natae: A Study of Catullus' Lesbia and her Early Greek Models". Her PhD was examined by the Classicist Marilyn Skinner. Before that she completed a Bachelor of Arts (Honours) at the University of Newcastle in 1988, where she won the university medal.

== Research and career ==
Johnson's research focused on the cultural historian of the ancient Mediterranean, especially sexuality and gender, particularly in the poetry of Sappho, Catullus, and Ovid, as well as magical traditions in Greece, Rome, and the Near East. She also researched Classical Reception Studies, with a regular focus on Australia, looking at the practices and art of Australian witch, Rosaleen Norton. Her first book, Sexuality in Greek and Roman Literature and Society: A Sourcebook was published in 2004, and was reissued in 2022.

Johnson spent most of her career as Professor of Classics at the University of Newcastle before retiring in 2024. She was a regular contributor to The Conversation.

Johnson identified a specific group of US-based feminist Classicists whose research changed the discipline in the late 1980s and 1990s as her professional inspiration:

'These women opened up the ancient world for me, and answered so many of the questions I had been asking myself and my teachers for years. Scholars like Marilyn Skinner (one of my PhD examiners), Amy Richlin (fearless and smart), Judith Hallett (egalitarian and prolific), and Page duBois (a justice-seeker and individual) challenged the traditions of Classics but never at the expense of outstanding intellectualism. All of these women, all of whom I have had the honour of meeting over the years, also taught me how to be a good feminist as well as a good scholar. In particular, Marilyn Skinner must be credited with making a major contribution to the scholar I am now – she was exacting, relentless and set an incredibly high standard.'

== Personal life and death ==
Johnson was killed in Lesvos, Greece, in a car accident on the Panagiouda–Moria road with her partner Leni Johnson in July 2026. Their car reportedly hit a lamppost before overturning. The couple had two children. The organisation, Australasian Women in Ancient World Studies (AWAWS), said it was “shocked and saddened” to hear of Johnson's death, describing her as a “brilliant, kind and thoughtful” mentor whose work shaped generations of students and researchers.

== Bibliography ==
- (2022). Sexuality in Greek and Roman society and literature: a sourcebook. 2nd ed. London, United Kingdom: Routledge. doi:10.4324/9781003242048
- (2016). Ovid on cosmetics: Medicamina Faciei Femineae and related texts. New York, NY, United States: Bloomsbury Academic. doi:10.5040/9781474218696.0008
- (2012). Boudicca. London, United Kingdom: Bristol Classical Press.
- (2007). Sappho. London, United Kingdom: Bristol Classical Press.
- (ed. with T. Ryan) (2004). Sexuality in Greek and Roman literature and society: a sourcebook. London, United Kingdom: Routledge. doi:10.4324/9780203645826
