= Papyrus Oxyrhynchus 1800 =

2nd century papyrus from ancient Egypt

Papyrus Oxyrhynchus 1800 (P. Oxy. 1800; FGrHist 1139) is part of a papyrus roll containing biographies of various mythical and historical figures from ancient Greece. It was discovered in 1905–06 as part of a large group of literary papyri. 31 fragments from the roll were published in the editio princeps; four further published fragments have since been identified as part of the same work. Based on the handwriting it has been dated to the late second century AD. There are a few corrections, possibly in the same hand as the original text. A coronis is used to divide sections.

Biographies of Sappho, Simonides, Aesop, Thucydides, Demosthenes, Aeschines, Thrasybulus, Hyperides, Leucocomas, and Abderus are identifiable; other fragments of the papyrus may be from lives of Alcaeus and Lysias. It is unclear why these biographies were grouped together. The arrangement is equally uncertain – while it makes sense for Sappho and Simonides, two lyric poets whose names begin with the same letter, to be grouped together, it is less clear why the Athenian logographer Hyperides should come next to the mythical Leucocomas. The lives may have been arranged into smaller groupings, such as Sappho and Simonides (both lyric poets), Demosthenes and Aeschines (Attic orators), and Thrasybulus and Hyperides (known for overthrowing tyrants); an overarching ordering principle remains elusive.

Graziano Arrighetti identifies the papyrus as an epitome of ancient biographies. The text may have been used in an educational context, and could have been used by students as a source of information for rhetorical exercises. Each life is preceded by a title and is written in chronological order, beginning with the subject's birthplace and family, and ending with their death; in some cases this is followed by a description of honours they received in the afterlife. The biography of Sappho is an exception, ending with a discussion of her work. The biographies do not generally name their sources, except for one reference to Chamaeleon in the life of Sappho.

== Works cited ==
- de Kreij, Mark (2018). "The Biographies of P.Oxy. 1800 (FGrHist 1139)". ZPE. 208.
- de Kreij, Mark; Meccariello, Chiara (2018). "Anonymous, Miscellaneous Lives (P. Oxy. XV 1800) (1139)". In Schorn, Stefan (ed.). Jacoby Online. Die Fragmente der Griechischen Historiker Continued, Part IV. Leiden: Brill. doi:10.1163/1873-5363_jciv_a1139.
- Grenfell, Bernard Pyne; Hunt, Arthur Surridge (1922). The Oxyrhynchus Papryi. Vol. XV.
