= Leslie Kurke =

American classical scholar

Leslie V. Kurke (born 1959) is a professor of Ancient Greek & Roman Studies and of Comparative Literature at the University of California, Berkeley.

She graduated from Bryn Mawr College in 1981 (B.A. Greek Literature) and from Princeton University (M.A, Ph.D. Classics) in 1988. Her doctoral thesis was Pindar's Oikonomia: The House as Organizing Metaphor in the Odes of Pindar.

Kurke is married to another professor at Berkeley, Andrew Garrett.

== Awards and honors ==
- 1999 MacArthur Fellows Program
- 2002 Distinguished Teaching Award, bestowed by the Berkeley Division of the Academic Senate's Committee on Teaching
- 2010 Elected to the American Philosophical Society
- 2020 Association of American Publishers PROSE Award in Classics, for Pindar, Song, and Space

== Publications ==
=== Books ===
- The Traffic in Praise: Pindar and the Poetics of Social Economy, Cornell University Press, 1991, ISBN 978-0-8014-2350-5; second online edition: California Classical Studies Number 1, eScholarship Repository, 2013, http://escholarship.org/uc/item/29r3j0gm.
- Coins, Bodies, Games, and Gold: The Politics of Meaning in Archaic Greece, Princeton University Press, 1999, ISBN 978-0-691-00736-6.
- Aesopic Conversations: Popular Tradition, Cultural Dialogue, and the Invention of Greek Prose, Princeton University Press, 2011, ISBN 978-0-69-114458-0.
- Co-authored with Richard Neer, Pindar, Song, and Space: Towards a Lyric Archaeology, Johns Hopkins University Press, 2019.

=== Edited volumes ===
- Editor (with Carol Dougherty), Cultural Poetics in Archaic Greece: Cult, Performance, Politics, Oxford University Press, 1998, ISBN 978-0-19-512415-6.
- Editor (with Carol Dougherty), The Cultures Within Ancient Greek Culture: Contact, Conflict, Collaboration, Cambridge University Press, 2003; paperback reprint, Cambridge University Press, 2011.
- Editor (with Margaret Foster and Naomi Weiss), Genre in Archaic and Classical Greek Poetry: Theories and Models, Brill, 2020.

=== Selected articles ===
- "Ancient Greek Board Games and How to Play Them," Classical Philology, Vol. 94, No. 3 (Jul., 1999), pp. 247-267, JSTOR 270405.
- "Choral Lyric as 'Ritualization': Poetic Sacrifice and Poetic Ego in Pindar's Sixth Paian," Classical Antiquity, Vol. 24, No. 1 (April 2005), pp. 81-130, JSTOR.
- "Counterfeit Oracles' and 'Legal Tender': The Politics of Oracular Consultation in Herodotus," The Classical World, Vol. 102, No. 4 (SUMMER 2009), pp. 417-43, JSTOR 40599876.
- "Crisis and Decorum in Sixth-Century Lesbos: Reading Alkaios Otherwise," Quaderni Urbinati di Cultura Classica, New Series, Vol. 47, No. 2 (1994), pp. 67-92, JSTOR 20547249.
- "A Dedicated Theory Class for Graduate Students," The Classical World, Vol. 108, No. 2 (WINTER 2015), pp. 183-194, JSTOR 24699959.
- "Fathers and Sons: A Note on Pindaric Ambiguity," The American Journal of Philology, Vol. 112, No. 3 (Autumn, 1991), pp. 287-300, JSTOR 294732.
- "For Mark" (with Mario Telò), Classical Antiquity, Vol. 39, No. 2 (October 2020), JSTOR 27220569.
- "Gender, Politics and Subverstion in the Chreiai of Machon," Proceedings of the Cambridge Philological Society, No. 48 (2002), pp. 20-65, JSTOR 44696777.
- "Gendered Spheres and Mythic Models in Sappho's Brothers Poem," Chapter 11 in The Newest Sappho: P. Sapph. Obbink and P. GC inv. 105, Frs. 1-4: Studies in Archaic and Classical Greek Song, vol. 2, Brill (2016), pp. 238-265, JSTOR Open Access.
- "Inventing the 'Hetaira': Sex, Politics, and Discursive Conflict in Archaic Greece," Classical Antiquity, Vol. 16, No. 1, (Apr., 1997), pp. 106-150, JSTOR 25011056.
- "ΚΑΠΗΛΕΙΑ and Deceit: Theognis 59-60," The American Journal of Philology, Vol. 110, No. 4 (Winter, 1989), pp. 535-544, JSTOR 295278.
- "Pindar and the Prostitutes, or Reading Ancient 'Pornography'," Arion: A Journal of Humanities and the Classics, Third Series, Vol. 4, No. 2 (Fall, 1996), pp. 49-75, JSTOR 20163615.
- "Pindar's Pythian 11 and the Oresteia: Contestatory Ritual Poetics in the 5th c. BCE," Classical Antiquity, Vol. 32, No. 1 (April 2013), pp. 101-175, JSTOR.
- "Pindar's Sixth Pythian and the Tradition of Advice Poetry," Transactions of the American Philological Association, Vol. 120 (1990), pp. 85-107, JSTOR 283980.
- "Plato, Aesop, and the Beginnings of Mimetic Prose," Representations, Vol. 94, No. 1 (Spring 2006), pp. 6-52, JSTOR.
- "The Politics of ἁβροσύνη in Archaic Greece," Classical Antiquity, Vol. 11, No. 1 (Apr., 1992), pp. 91-120, JSTOR 25010964.
- "Pudenda Asiae Minoris" (with Andrew Garrett), Harvard Studies in Classical Philology, Vol. 96 (1994), pp. 75-83, JSTOR 311315.
- "The 'Rough Stones' of Aegina: Pindar, Pausanias, and the Topography of Aeginetan Justice," Classical Antiquity, Vol. 36, No. 2 (October 2017), pp. 236-287, JSTOR 26362609.
