= Laura Swift =

British classical scholar

- Born: 21 November 1979 (age 46)

Academic background
- Education: Magdalen College, Oxford
- Thesis: The Hidden Chorus: Echoes of Genre in Tragic Lyric (2007)

Academic work
- Discipline: Classics
- Sub-discipline: theatre of ancient Greece; Greek tragedy; Greek lyric poetry
- Institutions: Trinity College, Oxford; New College, Oxford; University College London; Open University; Magdalen College, Oxford; Faculty of Classics, University of Oxford

Laura Ann Swift (born 21 November 1979) is a British classical scholar, specialising in the theatre of ancient Greece, Greek tragedy and Greek lyric poetry. She has been a fellow of Magdalen College, Oxford since 2022, and Professor of Greek in the Faculty of Classics, University of Oxford since 2024. She previously taught at University College London and the Open University. In October 2026, it was announced that she would be the next Regius Professor of Greek at the University of Oxford. She will take up the post on 1 October 2027, and will move to become a "student" (i.e. fellow) at Christ Church, Oxford.

== Early life and education ==
Swift was born on 21 November 1979. She studied Literae Humaniores at Magdalen College, Oxford, graduated with a Bachelor of Arts (BA) degree in 2002. She remained at the college to undertake postgraduate studies at the University of Oxford, and completed a Master of Studies (MSt) degree. She then undertook a Doctor of Philosophy (DPhil) degree in the Faculty of Classics, University of Oxford, under the supervision of Armand D'Angour. Her doctoral thesis was titled "The Hidden Chorus: Echoes of Genre in Tragic Lyric" and was completed in 2007. He doctoral thesis won the Hellenic Foundation Thesis Prize.

== Academic career ==
Swift began her academic career as a junior research fellow at Trinity College, Oxford, from 2006 to 2009. She was then a lecturer in classics at New College, Oxford, from 2009 to 2010, before moving to University College London on a Leverhulme Early Career Fellowship. In April 2012, she joined the Open University as a lecturer. In 2015, she was awarded a Philip Leverhulme Prize. During her time at the Open University, she was promoted to senior lecturer in classical studies.

In 2022, Swift returned to the University of Oxford as an associate professor of Greek in the Faculty of Classics, and a tutorial fellow in classics at Magdalen College, Oxford. In in September 2024, she was awarded a title of distinction as Professor of Greek. On 29 October 2026, it was announced that she would be the next Regius Professor of Greek at the University of Oxford. As the chair is based at Christ Church, Oxford, she will also become a "student" (i.e. fellow) of that college.

Swift's research concerns Greek tragedy and Greek lyric poetry. She has studied fragmentary texts and produced the first complete commentary on Archilochus, a seventh-century BC poet.

Swift is also an advocate for making Classics accessible to wider audiences. She has been involved in the Classical Civilisation A-level, contributing to its curriculum and editing a text book.

== Selected works ==
- Swift, Laura (2010). The hidden chorus: echoes of genre in tragic lyric. Oxford: Oxford University Press. ISBN 978-0199577842.
- Swift, Laura (2016). Greek tragedy: themes and contexts. London; New York: Bloomsbury Academic. ISBN 978-1474236836.
- Swift, Laura; Carey, Chris, eds. (2016). Iambus and Elegy: new approaches. Oxford; New York: Oxford University Press. ISBN 978-0199689743.
- Swift, Laura (2019). Archilochus: the poems. Oxford: Oxford University Press. ISBN 9780198768074.
- Swift, Laura, ed. (2022). A companion to Greek lyric. Hoboken, NJ: Wiley Blackwell. ISBN 9781119122623.
- Allan, William; Swift, Laura, eds. (2024). Euripides: Bacchae. Cambridge Greek and Latin Classics. Cambridge; New York, NY: Cambridge University Press. ISBN 978-1108948388.
