= Ameipsias =

5th-century BC Athenian playwright

Ameipsias (Ancient Greek: Ἀμειψίας, fl. late 5th century BC) of Athens was an Ancient Greek comic poet, a contemporary of Aristophanes, whom he twice bested in the dramatic contests. His Konnos (Κόννος) gained a second prize at the City Dionysia in 423, when Aristophanes won the third prize with The Clouds.

Konnos appears to have had the same subject and aim as Clouds. It is at least certain that Socrates appeared in the play, and that the Chorus consisted of Φροντισταί ("thinkers"). Aristophanes alludes to Ameipsias in The Frogs, and we are told in the anonymous life of Aristophanes, that when Aristophanes first exhibited his plays under the names of other poets, Ameipsias applied to him the Greek proverb τετράδι γεγονώς, which means "a person who labours for others," an allusion to Heracles, who was born on the fourth of the month.

== Works ==
Ameipsias wrote many comedies, out of which there remain only a few fragments of the following six plays:

- Ἀποκοτταβίζοντες (Men Playing Kottabos)
- Κατεσθίων (although this attribution is considered doubtful by many scholars)
- Κόννος (423 BC)
- Μοιχοί (Adulterers)
- Σαπφώ (Sappho)
- Σφενδόνη (The Sling)

We also know he wrote other plays, although their names are now lost. Most of his plays were of the Old Comedy, but some, in all probability, were of the Middle Comedy.
