= Eva-Maria Voigt =

German classical philologist

- Born: 5 January 1921; Hamburg, Weimar Republic
- Died: 26 July 2013 (aged 92); Waldkirch, Germany

Academic background
- Education: University of Hamburg

Academic work
- Discipline: Classics
- Sub-discipline: Ancient Greek literature
- Institutions: University of Hamburg

Eva-Maria Voigt (5 January 1921 – 26 July 2013, born Eva-Maria Hamm) was a German classical philologist, known for her work on the archaic Greek poets Sappho and Alcaeus.

== Life ==
She studied Classical Philology at the University of Hamburg, and received her doctorate in 1945 with a dissertation "Zur Nominal- und Verbalflexion bei Sappho und Alkaios". From 1955 to 1984, she worked as editor of the Lexicon of the Early Greek Epic, completed in 2010. In 1971, Voigt published Sappho et Alcaeus: Fragmenta. She was a professor of classical philology at the University of Hamburg. She retired in April 1983, to Waldkirch.

== Works ==
- Fragmente von Sappho und Alkaios, Amsterdam, Athenaeum-Polak & Van Gennep, 1971.
- Grammatik zu Sappho und Alkaios (Berlin 1957)
