= William Allan (classicist) =

Scottish classicist (born 1970)

William Allan (born 1970) is a Scottish classicist specializing in Greek epic and tragedy, particularly the plays of Euripides. He is currently McConnell Laing Fellow and Tutor in Greek and Latin Languages and Literature at University College, Oxford and Professor of Greek in the Faculty of Classics, University of Oxford. He was formerly Assistant Professor of Classics at Harvard University.

== Early life and education ==
He was educated at Denend Primary School and then, from 1982 to 1988, at Glenrothes High School in Fife, Scotland. He then studied classics and Gaelic at the University of Edinburgh, graduating with an undergraduate Master of Arts (MA Hons) degree. He undertook postgraduate study at the University of Oxford, completing a Doctor of Philosophy (DPhil) degree.

== Academic career ==
In 2020, as part of that year's awards of titles of distinction by the University of Oxford, he was appointed Professor of Greek. He was awarded a Leverhulme Research Fellowship for the 2021/2022 academic year.

== Works ==
- The Andromache and Euripidean Tragedy (Oxford University Press, 2000; paperback edn. 2003)
- Euripides: The Children of Heracles (Aris and Phillips, 2001)
- Euripides: Medea (Duckworth, 2002)
- Helen (Cambridge University Press, 2008). commentary
- Classical Literature : A Very Short Introduction (Oxford University Press, 2014)
- Allan, William; Swift, Laura, eds. (2024). Euripides: Bacchae. Cambridge Greek and Latin Classics. Cambridge; New York, NY: Cambridge University Press. ISBN 978-1108948388.
