= Patrick Finglass =

Greek literature specialist

Patrick J. Finglass
- Education: St. John's College, Oxford

Patrick J. Finglass is a British scholar of Ancient Greek literature, who has served as Henry Overton Wills Professor of Greek at the University of Bristol since 2017. He was previously a lecturer and professor at the University of Nottingham (2006–2017), having previously been a Prize Fellow at All Souls' College, Oxford (2001–2008). His field of research includes Greek lyric poetry and Greek tragedy, with a particular interest in the authors Sophocles, Euripides, Pindar, and Stesichorus. He is a current editor of The Classical Quarterly, and has penned numerous articles and critical editions of Greek texts with extensive commentary.

== Personal life ==
While he was pursuing his undergraduate studies at St John's College, Oxford, Finglass was the captain of his college's University Challenge team that managed to reach the grand final of the 2000–01 series of University Challenge. They ultimately finished though as runners-up to the victorious Imperial College London team.

== Selected published works ==
- 2021 - The Cambridge Companion to Sappho (Cambridge, with Adrian Kelly)
- 2020 - Female Characters in Fragmentary Greek Tragedy (Cambridge, with Lyndsay Coo)
- 2019 - Sophocles (Cambridge)
- 2018 - Sophocles: Oedipus the King (Cambridge Classical Texts and Commentaries)
- 2015 - Stesichorus in Context (Cambridge, with Adrian Kelly)
- 2014 - Stesichorus: The Poems (Cambridge Classical Texts and Commentaries, with Malcolm Davies)
- 2011 - Sophocles: Ajax (Cambridge Classical Texts and Commentaries)
- 2007 - Sophocles: Electra (Cambridge Classical Texts and Commentaries)
