= Page duBois =

American professor of literature

- Occupation: Classicist

Academic background
- Education: University of California, Berkeley

Academic work
- Discipline: Classics, Cultural Studies
- Institutions: University of California, San Diego

Page duBois is professor of classics and comparative literature at the University of California, San Diego. She is known for her work in Ancient Greek literature, feminist theory and psychoanalysis.

== Career ==
DuBois received her BA from Stanford University, and her PhD from the University of California at Berkeley. She is now professor of classics and comparative literature at the University of California, San Diego, where she is part of the literature department and the Center for Hellenic Studies.

She gave the 2018 James W. Poultney Memorial Lecture at the University of California, San Diego.

== Publications ==
- History, Rhetorical Description and the Epic: From Homer to Spenser. Cambridge: Boydell and Brewer, 1982. ISBN 9780859910934
- Centaurs and Amazons: Women and the Prehistory of the Great Chain of Being. Ann Arbor: University of Michigan Press, 1982. ISBN 9780472081530
- 'A Disturbance of Syntax at the Gates of Rome,' Stanford Literature Review, 2 (1985): 185–208.
- Sowing the Body: Psychoanalysis and Ancient Representations of Women. Chicago: University of Chicago Press, 1988. ISBN 9780226167572
- 'Inscription, the Law, and the Comic Body,' Métis: Revue d'anthropologie du monde grec ancien, 3 (1988): 69–84.
- Il corpo come metafora: Rappresentazioni della donna nella Grecia antica. Rome: Laterza, 1990. ISBN 9788842035442
- Torture and Truth. New York and London: Routledge, 1991. ISBN 9780415902137
- Sappho Is Burning. Chicago: University of Chicago Press, 1995. ISBN 9780226167558
- Trojan Horses: Saving the Classics from Conservatives. New York: New York University Press, 2001. ISBN 9780814769898
- Slaves and Other Objects. University of Chicago Press, 2003. ISBN 9780226167879
- Slavery: Antiquity and its Legacy (Ancients and Moderns). I.B.Tauris, 2009. ISBN 9781845119263
- Out of Athens: the new ancient Greeks. Harvard University Press, 2010. ISBN 9780674035584
- A Million and One Gods: The Persistence of Polytheism. Harvard University Press, 2014. ISBN 9780674728837
- Sappho (Understanding Classics). I.B.Tauris, 2015. ISBN 9781784533601
