= Sappho 16 =

Fragment of a poem by Sappho

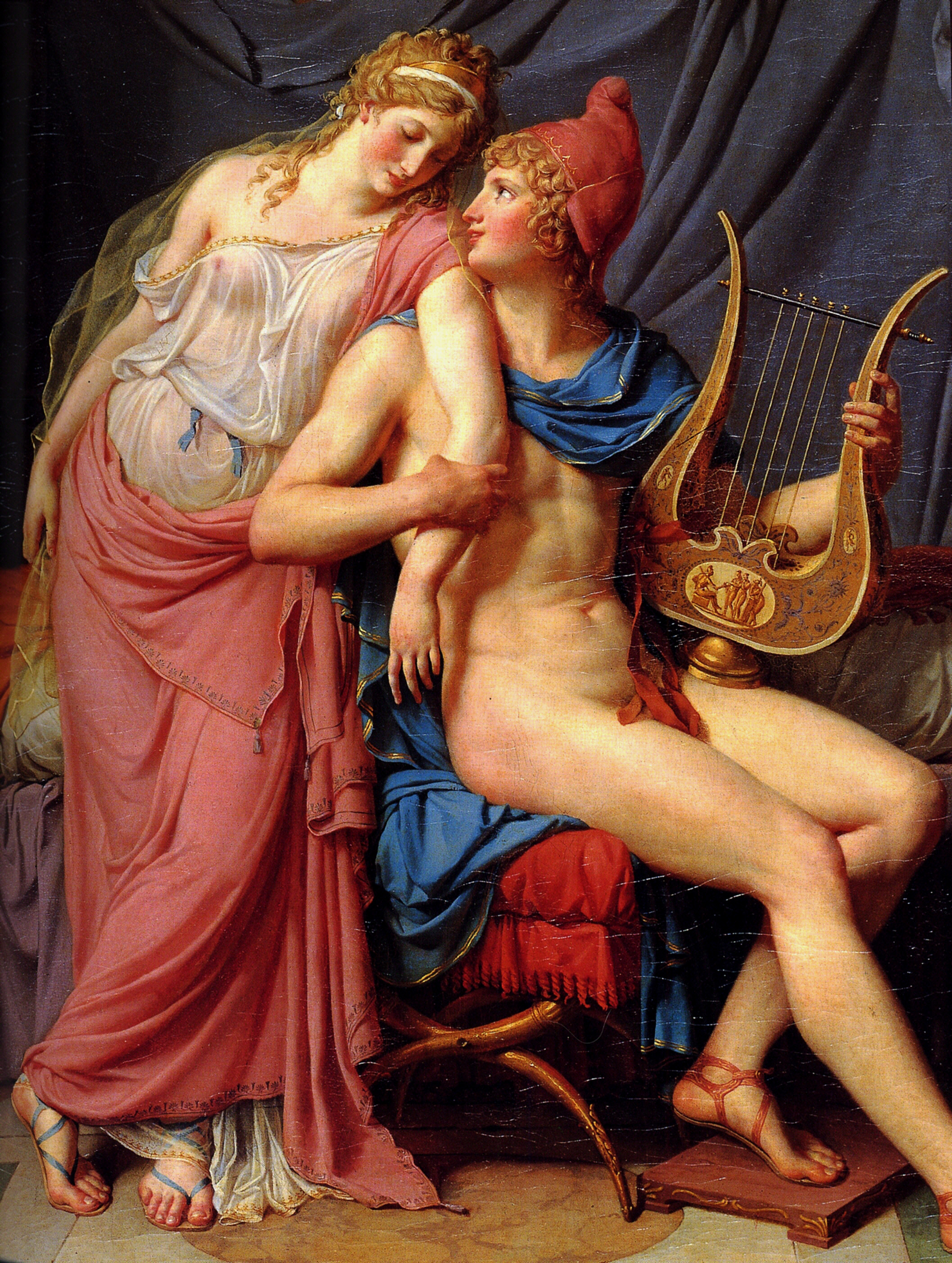
In fragment 16, Sappho uses Helen's love for Paris (depicted here in a painting by Jacques-Louis David) as an example of her claim that the most beautiful thing in the world is whatever one most loves.

Sappho 16 is a fragment of a poem by the archaic Greek lyric poet Sappho. (Note: The fragments of Sappho's poetry are numbered differently in different editions. This article uses the numeration from Eva-Maria Voigt's Sappho et Alcaeus; this numeration is based on, and usually matches, the earlier system used by Edgar Lobel and Denys Page. Sappho 16 Voigt is Sappho 27 in Diehl's edition; it does not appear in Theodor Bergk's edition as it had not yet been discovered.) It is from Book I of the Alexandrian edition of Sappho's poetry, and is known from a second-century papyrus discovered at Oxyrhynchus in Egypt at the beginning of the twentieth century. Sappho 16 is a love poem – the genre for which Sappho was best known – which praises the beauty of the narrator's beloved, Anactoria, and expresses the speaker's desire for her now that she is absent. It makes the case that the most beautiful thing in the world is whatever one desires, using Helen of Troy's elopement with Paris as a mythological exemplum to support this argument. The poem is at least 20 lines long, though it is uncertain whether the poem ends at line 20 or continues for another stanza.

== Preservation ==
Fragment 16 was preserved on Papyrus Oxyrhynchus 1231, a second-century manuscript of Book I of an edition of Sappho, published by Bernard Pyne Grenfell and Arthur Surridge Hunt in 1914. In 2014, a papyrus discovered by Simon Burris, Jeffrey Fish, and Dirk Obbink – P. GC. inv. 105 – added a few words to the known text of the poem. This papyrus dates to the late-second or early-third century, and is in the same hand as a second papyrus published for the first time in 2014 (P. Sapph. Obbink), which preserves five stanzas of Sappho's Brothers Poem.

== Poem ==
Fragment 16 is, along with the other poems of Book I of Sappho's works, composed in Sapphic stanzas. This metre is made up of stanzas of four lines, the first three of which are Sapphic hendecasyllables, of the form "¯ ˘ ¯ × ¯ ˘ ˘ ¯ ¯ ˘ ¯ ¯", followed by a five-syllable adonean, of the form "¯ ˘ ˘ ¯ ¯". At least five stanzas survive; whether the poem ends there or continues into what Burris, Fish, and Obbink number fragment 16a is disputed.

The poem is one of five surviving poems by Sappho which is about "the power of love". It expresses the speaker's desire for the absent Anactoria, praising her beauty. This encomium follows the poet making the broader point that the most beautiful thing to any person is whatever they love the most; an argument that Sappho supports with the mythological example of Helen's love for Paris. Some commentators have argued that the poem deliberately adopts this position as a rejection of typical Greek male values. The poem follows a chiastic structure, beginning with a preamble, moving through to the mythical exemplum of the story of Paris and Helen, and returning to the subject of the preamble for the concluding stanza.

The poem begins with a priamel – a rhetorical structure where a list of alternatives are contrasted with a final, different idea. The first stanza opens with a list of things which some people believe are the most beautiful in the world: "some say an army of horsemen, others say foot soldiers, still others say a fleet". (Note: Sappho 16.1–2 (Note: Translations of Sappho, unless otherwise attributed, are from Rayor & Lardinois 2014)) The poet goes on to propose a more general rule: that in fact superlative beauty is a property of "whatever one loves". (Note: Sappho 16.4)

This introductory stanza is followed by a mythological exemplum to demonstrate this idea – that of Helen of Troy, who abandoned her husband, daughter, and parents to be with the man she loved. This use of Helen as a mythological exemplum might be seen as problematic: after all, Helen is the most beautiful mortal, and yet Sappho has her judging Paris to be the most beautiful. Harold Zellner explains this apparent paradox as an integral part of the argument that Sappho makes that the most beautiful is the one that one loves: the apparent contradiction between Helen being the most beautiful, and Helen finding Paris the most beautiful, can be resolved if we agree with Sappho's definition of beauty.

After setting out Sappho's definition of what beauty is, the poem moves into a more personal section, recalling the narrator's beloved, Anactoria. The transition from the mythological example of Helen and Paris to the narrator's desire for Anactoria is missing, so it is not known what exactly reminded the narrator of her. George Koniaris believes that this transition, with the apparently spontaneous introduction of Anactoria, makes Sappho's praise for her seem fresh; by contrast, Hutchinson sees it as emphasising the deliberate artificiality of the work.

=== Text ===
Οἰ μὲν ἰππήων στρότον, οἰ δὲ πέσδων,
οἰ δὲ νάων φαῖσ’ ἐπὶ γᾶν μέλαιναν
ἔμμεναι κάλλιστον, ἐγὼ δὲ κῆν’ ὄτ-
τω τις ἔραται

πά]γχυ δ’ εὔμαρες σύνετον πόησαι
πά]ντι τ[οῦ]τ’· ἀ γὰρ πολὺ περσκέθοισα
κά]λλος ἀνθρώπων Ἐλένα [τὸ]ν ἄνδρα
τὸν πανάριστον

καλλίποισ’ ἔβας ‘ς Τροίαν πλέοισα
κωὐδὲ παῖδος οὐδὲ φίλων τοκήων
πάμπαν ἐμνάσθη, ἀλλὰ παράγαγ’ αὔταν
οὐκ ἀέκοισαν

Κύπρις· εὔκαμπτον γὰρ ἔφυ βρότων κῆρ
] κούφως τ . . . οη . . . ν
κἄμε νῦν Ἀνακτορίας ὀνέμναι-
σ’ οὐ παρεοίσας

τᾶς κε βολλοίμαν ἔρατόν τε βᾶμα
κἀμάρυχμα λάμπρον ἴδην προσώπω
ἢ τὰ Λύδων ἄρματα κἀν ὄπλοισι
πεσδομάχεντας.

Translation:

— via William Annis

=== Helen of Troy ===
Many commentators have suggested that Sappho's use of Helen as an example in this poem is intended as a rejection of masculine in favour of feminine values. For instance, John J. Winkler argues that the poem sets Sappho's definition of beauty against a masculine ideal of military power. However, G. O. Hutchinson notes that, though the definition of beauty Sappho attacks might seem a characteristically male one, the definition she replaces it with is generally applicable, rather than being solely relevant to women.

Page duBois has argued that Sappho's portrayal of Helen in this poem is a reversal of the relationships between men and women in the Homeric poems, where men act upon women; Helen in Sappho's poem is, according to duBois, an actor who has her own agency and makes her own choices. Others disagree: Eric Dodson-Robinson suggests that the relationships portrayed by Homer between men and women are more complex than duBois suggests, and Margaret Williamson argues that Sappho portrays Helen not just as one who acts, and who is celebrated for her action, but also one who is acted upon.

As well as Homer's Helen, the poem has been seen as responding to, or being responded to by, Alcaeus' portrayal of Helen in fragments 283 and 42. Ruby Blondell argues that Sappho's portrayal of Helen is much more concerned with her agency than Alcaeus' is. While in Alcaeus, Paris is the "deceiver of his host", in Sappho his role is more of a passive object of desire.

=== Anactoria ===
Anactoria is probably the same person as Anagora of Miletus, mentioned in the Suda as a pupil of Sappho. She is listed by Maximus of Tyre along with Atthis and Gyrinna, as one whom Sappho loved as Socrates loved Alcibiades, Charmides, and Phaedrus.

In the poem, Anactoria is absent, though it is not evident from the surviving lines exactly why. One suggestion is that she has left Sappho in order to marry. Christopher Brown argues that the description of Anactoria's αμαρυχμα ("the radiant sparkle of her face") is suggestive of the χαρις ("grace", "charm") of a "nubile girl" of marriageable age, and that it is likely that Anactoria has returned to her native city in order to marry. Eric Dodson-Robinson suggests that the poem could have been performed at a wedding, with Anactoria the bride leaving her family and friends. George Koniaris disagrees, arguing that there is "no special reason" to believe that Anactoria left Sappho for a man. Glenn Most goes further, saying that there is no reason to believe that Anactoria's absence was anything more than temporary.

== Continuation after line 20 ==
Scholars disagree on whether fragment 16 continued after line 20 or ended at this point. Before the discovery of the Green Collection papyri, most scholars believed that the poem ended at line 20, and when Burris, Fish, and Obbink published the Green Collection papyri, they too ended the poem there. If the poem did end at this point, the priamel around which the poem is based is complete, and the poem would have had a ring structure. However, Joel Lidov argues that the stanza which Burris, Fish, and Obbink consider the first of fragment 16a fits better as the end of fragment 16. Rayor and Lardinois also believe that lines 21–24 of P. GC. inv. 105 are part of fragment 16, drawing comparisons with line 17 of fragment 31 and the ending of the Tithonus poem, two other cases where a poem by Sappho ends with the narrator reconciling herself to an impossible situation.

== Works cited ==
- Barkhuizen, J. H.; Els, G. H. (1983). "On Sappho, Fr. 16 (L.P.)". Acta Classica. 26.
- Bierl, Anton; Lardinois, André (2016). "Introduction". In Bierl, Anton; Lardinois, André (eds.). The Newest Sappho: P. Sapph. Obbink and P. GC inv. 105, frs.1–4. Leiden: Brill. ISBN 978-90-04-31483-2.
- Blondell, Ruby (2010). "Refractions of Homer's Helen in Archaic Lyric". American Journal of Philology. 131 (3): 349–391. doi:10.1353/ajp.2010.0005.
- Boehringer, Sandra; Calame, Claude (2016). "Sappho and Kypris: "The Vertigo of Love" (P. Sapph. Obbink 21–29; P. Oxy. 1231, fr. 16)". In Bierl, Anton; Lardinois, André (eds.). The Newest Sappho: P. Sapph. Obbink and P. GC inv. 105, frs.1–4. Leiden: Brill. ISBN 978-90-04-31483-2.
- Brown, Christopher (1989). "Anactoria and the Χαρίτων ἀμαρύγματα: Sappho fr. 16, 18 Voigt". Quaderni Urbinati di Cultura Classica. 32 (2). doi:10.2307/20546993. JSTOR 20546993.
- Burris, Simon; Fish, Jeffrey; Obbink, Dirk (2014). "New Fragments of Book 1 of Sappho". Zeitschrift für Papyrologie und Epigraphik. 189.
- Carson, Anne (2003). If Not, Winter: Fragments of Sappho. London: Virago. ISBN 978-1-84408-081-6.
- Dodson-Robinson, Eric (2010). "Helen's "Judgment of Paris" and Greek Marriage Ritual in Sappho 16". Arethusa. 43 (1): 1–20. doi:10.1353/are.0.0032. hdl:2152/34292.
- Grenfell, Bernard Pyne; Hunt, Arthur Surridge, eds. (1914). The Oxyrhynchus Papyri. Vol. X. London: Egypt Exploration Fund.
- Hutchinson, G. O. (2001). Greek Lyric Poetry: A Commentary on Selected Larger Pieces. Oxford: Oxford University Press. ISBN 0-19-924017-5.
- Koniaris, George (1967). "On Sappho, Fr. 16 (L. P.)". Hermes. 95 (3).
- Lardinois, André (2011). "The New Sappho Poem (P.Köln 21351 and 21376): Key to the Old Fragments". Classics@. 4. Archived from the original on 2019-03-02.
- Lidov, Joel (2016). "Songs for Sailors and Lovers". In Bierl, Anton; Lardinois, André (eds.). The Newest Sappho: P. Sapph. Obbink and P. GC inv. 105, frs.1–4. Leiden: Brill. ISBN 978-90-04-31483-2.
- Most, G. W. (1981). "Sappho Fr. 16.6–7 L–P". The Classical Quarterly. 31 (1): 11–17. doi:10.1017/S0009838800021030. S2CID 170931261.
- Obbink, Dirk (2016). "Ten Poems of Sappho: Provenance, Authenticity, and Text of the New Sappho Papyri". In Bierl, Anton; Lardinois, André (eds.). The Newest Sappho: P. Sapph. Obbink and P. GC inv. 105, frs.1–4. Leiden: Brill. ISBN 978-90-04-31483-2.
- Rayor, Diane; Lardinois, André (2014). Sappho: A New Translation of the Complete Works. Cambridge: Cambridge University Press.
- Rutherford, Richard (2005). Classical Literature: A Concise History. Malden, MA: Blackwell. ISBN 0-631-23132-3.
- Winkler, John J. (1990). The Constraints of Desire: The Anthropology of Sex and Gender in Ancient Greece. New York: Routledge. ISBN 0-415-90122-7.
- Zellner, Harold (2007). "Sappho's Alleged Proof of Aesthetic Relativity". Greek, Roman, and Byzantine Studies. 47.
