= False god =

Derogatory term for foreign deities in Abrahamic religions

The phrase false god is a term used mainly in Abrahamic religions (namely Judaism, Samaritanism, Christianity, Islam, and the Baháʼí Faith) to indicate cult images or deities of non-Abrahamic religions, as well as other competing entities or objects to which particular importance is attributed. (Note: Attributed to multiple academic references:) Conversely, followers of animistic and polytheistic religions may regard the gods of various monotheistic religions as "false gods", because they do not believe that any real deity possesses the properties ascribed by monotheists to their sole deity. Atheists, who do not believe in any deities, do not usually use the term false god even though that would encompass all deities from the atheistic viewpoint. Usage of this term is generally limited to theists, who choose to worship one deity or more deities, but not others.

== Overview ==
In Abrahamic religions, false god is used as a derogatory term to refer to a deity or object of worship besides the Abrahamic god that is regarded as either illegitimate or non-functioning in its professed authority or capability, and this characterization is further used as a definition of "idol".

The term false god is often used throughout the Abrahamic scriptures (Torah, Tanakh, Bible, and Quran) to single out Elohim/Yahweh (interpreted by Jews, Samaritans, and Christians) or Al-Ilah/Allah (interpreted by Muslims) as the only true God. Nevertheless, the Hebrew Bible/Old Testament itself recognizes and reports that on multiple occasions, the Israelites were not monotheists but actively engaged in idolatry and worshipped many foreign, non-Jewish Gods besides Yahweh and/or instead of him, (such as Baal, Astarte, Asherah, Chemosh, Dagon, Moloch, Tammuz, and more), and continued to do so until their return from the Babylonian exile (see Ancient Hebrew religion).

Judaism, the oldest Abrahamic religion, eventually shifted into a strict, exclusive monotheism, based on the sole veneration of Yahweh, the predecessor to the Abrahamic conception of God. (Note: Although the Semitic god El is indeed the most ancient predecessor to the Abrahamic god, this specifically refers to the ancient ideas Yahweh once encompassed in the Ancient Hebrew religion, such as being a storm- and war-god, living on mountains, or controlling the weather. Thus, in this page's context, "Yahweh" is used to refer to God as conceived in the Ancient Hebrew religion, and should not be referenced when describing his later worship in today's Abrahamic religions.) According to rabbinic tradition, the Evil Inclination for idolatry was eradicated in the early Second Temple period, and this is what led to the shift away from earlier Israelite polytheism.

The vast majority of religions in history have been and/or are still polytheistic, worshipping many diverse deities. Moreover, the material depiction of a deity or more deities has always played an eminent role in all cultures of the world. The claim to worship the "one and only true God" came to most of the world with the arrival of Abrahamic religions and is the distinguishing characteristic of their monotheistic worldview, whereas virtually all the other religions in the world have been and/or are still animistic and polytheistic.

== In the Hebrew Bible ==
The Tanakh refers to deities from other neighboring cultures as shedim (Hebrew: שֵׁדִים), possibly a loan-word from Akkadian in which the word shedu referred to a spirit which could be either protective or malevolent. They appear twice (always plural), at Psalm 106:37 and Deuteronomy 32:17. Both times it is mentioned in the context of sacrificing children or animals to them. When the Hebrew Bible was translated into Greek, the Hebrew term shedim was translated as daimones, with implied negativity. This gave rise to a dualism between native spirits of the own religion's God, and the spirits of foreign origin as demons.

== In Gnosticism ==
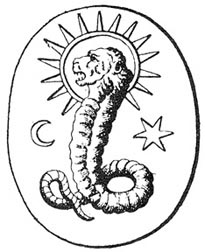
A lion-faced, serpentine deity found on a Gnostic gem in Bernard de Montfaucon's L'antiquité expliquée et représentée en figures, a depiction of Yaldabaoth.

In Gnosticism, the biblical serpent in the Garden of Eden was praised and thanked for bringing knowledge (gnosis) to Adam and Eve and thereby freeing them from the malevolent Demiurge's control. Gnostic Christian doctrines rely on a dualistic cosmology that implies the eternal conflict between good and evil, and a conception of the serpent as the liberating savior and bestower of knowledge to humankind opposed to the Demiurge or creator god, identified with the Hebrew God of the Old Testament.

Gnostic Christians considered the Hebrew God of the Old Testament as the evil, false god and creator of the material universe, and the Unknown God of the Gospel, the father of Jesus Christ and creator of the spiritual world, as the true, good God. In the Archontic, Sethian, and Ophite systems, Yaldabaoth (Yahweh) is regarded as the malevolent Demiurge and false god of the Old Testament who sinned by claiming divinity for himself and generated the material universe and keeps the souls trapped in physical bodies, imprisoned in the world full of pain and suffering that he created.

However, not all Gnostic movements regarded the creator of the material universe as inherently evil or malevolent. For instance, Valentinians believed that the Demiurge is merely an ignorant and incompetent creator, trying to fashion the world as good as he can, but lacking the proper power to maintain its goodness. All Gnostics were regarded as heretics by the proto-orthodox Early Church Fathers.

== In Islam ==
The Quran refers to jinn as entities who had a similar status to that of lesser deities in the pre-Islamic Arabian religion. Although the Quran does not equate the jinn to the rank of demons, it reduces them to the same status as human beings. Due to their mortality and dependence on fate (ḳadar), they would also be subjected to the final judgment by Allāh. Abū Manṣūr al-Māturīdī, the 10th-century Persian Muslim scholar, Ḥanafī jurist, and Sunnī theologian who founded the eponymous school of Islamic theology, considered the jinn to be weaker than humans, and asserted that whenever humans act upon the jinn, they humiliate themselves.

Alternatively, ṭāġūt may refer to idols, sometimes thought to be inhabited by one or more demons. Muslims do not necessarily deny the power of spirits within the idol, but deny that they are worthy of worship. In the Kitāb al-ʾAṣnām ("Book of the Idols"), the Arab Muslim historian Ibn al-Kalbī (c. 737–819 CE) tells how Muhammad ordered Khālid ibn al-Walīd to kill the pre-Islamic Arabian goddess al-ʿUzzā, who was supposed to inhabit three trees. After cutting down all the trees, a woman with wild hair appears, identified with al-ʿUzzā. After battle, she is killed, and thus al-ʿUzzā considered to be defeated.

Similarly, the Arab Muslim geographer al-Maqdisī (c. 945/946–991 CE) wrote about Indian deities (known in Middle Eastern folklore as dīv), asserting that they have the power to enchant people, even Muslims, to worship them. A Muslim is said to have visited them and abandoned Islam. When he reached Muslim land again, he returned to his Islamic faith. The power of idols is not limited to enchantment alone, they could even grant wishes.

Other similar entities are the shurakāʼ ("partners [of God]"), whose existence is not denied, however their relation to God is. They are regarded as powerless beings, who will be cast into Hell after the Day of Judgment, along with evil jinn and fallen angels turned devils (shayāṭīn), for usurping the divine nature.

== See also ==
- Ancient Canaanite religion
- Ancient Semitic religion
- Atenism
- Baháʼí Faith and the unity of religion
- Dhimmi
- Demiurge
- Dystheism
- Ethical monotheism
- Evil God challenge
- False prophet
- Gnosticism
- God in Abrahamic religions
  - God in the Baháʼí Faith
  - God in Christianity
  - God in Judaism
  - God in Islam
  - God in Mormonism
  - Jehovah's Witnesses beliefs § God
- God in Sikhism
- God in Zoroastrianism
- Maltheism
- Moralistic therapeutic deism
- Natural religion
- Outline of theology
- Problem of evil
- Problem of Hell
- Religion in pre-Islamic Arabia
- Satanic Verses
- Semitic Neopaganism
- Seven Laws of Noah
  - Ger toshav (resident alien)
  - Noahidism
- Theistic Satanism
- Theodicy
- Urmonotheismus (primitive monotheism)
- Violence in the Bible
- Violence in the Quran
