= The Garden of Proserpine =

Poem by A. C. Swinburne

"The Garden of Proserpine" is a poem by Algernon Charles Swinburne, published in Poems and Ballads in 1866.

Proserpine is the Latin spelling of Persephone, a goddess married to Hades, god of the underworld. According to some accounts, she had a garden of ever blooming flowers (poppies) in the underworld. The Greek and Roman festivals honoring her and her mother, Ceres, emphasized Proserpine's return to the upper world in spring. According to the myths which talk of Persephone's Pearls, bringing visitors for lonely Persephone, these poppies induce waking sleep if picked and travelers forget their purpose, trapped wandering the underworld until they no longer are touching these flowers. In Swinburne's poems, however, the emphasis is on her role as goddess of death and eternal sleep.

There are twelve stanzas in the poem. Each stanza is an "octave stanza" of eight lines, and all of the stanzas have the same internal pattern of rhymes. This rhyme scheme is recognized as a trimeter, with the pattern ABABCCCB, placing stress at the end of the poem where the three Cs rhyme and when Bs rhymes with the start of the poem. The rhyme scheme reflects Swinburne's emphasis on the last line of each stanza, breaking it up from the rest of the poem, creating a harmonious ring to the feminine ending of each stanza.

Diction is another crucial aspect to Swinburne's poem because it conveys the tone and feelings deeper than the writing. In "The Garden of Proserpine", the Victorian Crisis of Faith is an underlying issue that Swinburne uses strong, emphasizing diction and metaphors to convey Proserpine's feelings challenging Christianity and asserting his values of paganism and masochism. Phrases such as "who gathers all things mortal; with cold immortal hands" and "Here life has death for neighbour" are examples of the specific diction used to portray a negative tone toward religion, linking directly to the theme of life and death of the poem, as Proserpine is a symbol of the threshold between life and death.

"The Garden of Proserpine" was also written as part of his first series of Poems and Ballads in 1866, depicting the spirit and form of Greek tragedy, including more of his most popular poems such as "Dolores".

== History ==
"The Garden of Proserpine" brings up various questions commonly accompanying the Crisis of Faith of the Victorian era involving what happens after death. The Crisis of Faith was the response to new scientific evidence that contradicted the long-accepted claims of the Church of England. It resulted in a growing sense of secularism and a sense of vulnerability by the people. The question of what happens after death was one of the church's biggest defenses to this growing secularity, as faith guaranteed immortality after death.

Swinburne was a strong advocate of Aestheticism, and believed that art should be able to exist independently of political and moral ideologies. This concept was often referred to as "art for art's sake". Swinburne once announced that his poetic theory "insists upon the uninhibited exploration of all issues and experiences relevant to comprehensively prophetic treatment of the human condition". In Garden of Proserpine, we see elements of aestheticism and this applied poetic theory in the fact that it works to challenge Christianity and Pagan religions.

"The Garden of Proserpine" works to challenge these religions by displaying a godless afterlife, tormented only by the blind will to live. This lyric expresses feelings validated by Swinburne's pessimistic philosophy. Proserpine is the goddess of eternal death, which by nature overpowers the other gods. However, she is not actively powerful considering she represents nothingness herself. The Garden of Proserpine represents a sense of harmony, calm, and oblivion that only truly exists in this realm of nothingness. It is said to symbolize "the brief total pause of passion and thought after tempestuous pleasures when the spirit, without fear or hope of good things or evil, hungers and thirsts only after the perfect sleep". This poem celebrates the finality of death and the nothingness that lies beyond Persephone's welcoming arms, making a stark contrast to the beliefs of leading religions during this time.

== Critical response ==
During his years as a journalist, John Morley famously described that Swinburne was always either "the vindictive apostle of a crushing and iron shod despair or else the libidinous laureate of a pack of satyrs", and that his poem "The Garden of Proserpine" displayed what kind of person Morley thought he was. In a contradicting book called Persephone Rises, 1860–1927, by Margot Kathleen Louis, she presents that not everyone thought the same as Morley did about Swinburne and the poem. "In the 1870s, Swinburne and Dante Gabriel Rossetti had a close friendship. The painting of a picture of Proserpine with a pomegranate in her hand done by Rossetti may have well been influenced by Swinburne's poem. He also wrote a sonnet to accompany the painting."

Martha Hale Shackford states in her article "Swinburne and Delavigne" (1918) that his poem has "long been a favorite, for its subtle cadences have elusive, indefinable melody", and "the dim beauty of Proserpine's realm is a masterpiece of descriptive art". In the same article review, Shackford compares Swinburne's poem to Casimir Delavigne's poem "Les Limbes". According to Shackford, Swinburne "derived some of his inspiration in the writing of his poem from Delavigne's". Most of the parts of Swinburne's poem, he borrows many of Delavigne's ideas, modifies them and makes them his own. Shackford writes, "the relationships between the two poems are summed up as this; The theme is the lower or underworld, both devote many stanzas to the description of the underworld, the development of theme is proceeded by descriptions of natural aspects to the description of the listless beings who inhabit the underworld, and that both conclude the third section depicting a central dominate feminine figure".

== In other media ==
=== Literature ===
The poem is mentioned in Lemony Snicket's A Series of Unfortunate Events (where the first line of the poem, "Here, where the world is quiet", was slightly modified to become the motto of the secret organization V.F.D.) and Rick Riordan's The Lightning Thief. A portion of the poem is quoted, and plays a pivotal role, in the novel Martin Eden by Jack London. The poem serves as an inspiration for and is quoted in Frank Belknap Long's short story "Step into My Garden", published in August 1942 in the pulp magazine Unknown Worlds. It is also mentioned in A. S. Byatt's book Possession. Several lines are quoted on two different occasions in Shirley Jackson's novel Hangsaman. The phrase "she waits for all men born" was used as the title of a science fiction short story by James Tiptree Jr.

=== Television ===
The poem is quoted at the end of episode 2 of season 3 of Netflix's adaptation of Lemony Snicket's A Series of Unfortunate Events. This poem is also quoted by Major Jonathan Eliot (Adam West) and Audra Barkley (Linda Evans) in the first episode ("Silent Battle") of the fourth season of the TV series The Big Valley. A portion of the poem was also used in the Bat Masterson TV episode "Wanted – Alive Please" of 25 May 1960.

=== Film ===
This poem is partially quoted by Doc Shultz (Dub Taylor) in Support Your Local Gunfighter. It is also recited in part by James Graham (Christian Bale) while in the internment camp in Empire of the Sun.

=== Music ===
In 1899, the young English composer Ralph Vaughan Williams put to music several poems for soprano, chorus, and full orchestra into a 25-minute piece, The Garden of Proserpine, a work that had to wait 112 years for a public performance. It was recorded in 2010 and released on CD in the year 2013. Many British composers (Parry, Stanford, Bantock, Bax, etc.) seem to have been inspired by Swinburne's writing as well.

== See also ==
- "Hymn to Proserpine", another poem by A. C. Swinburne
