= Dolores (Notre-Dame des Sept Douleurs) =

1866 poem by A. C. Swinburne

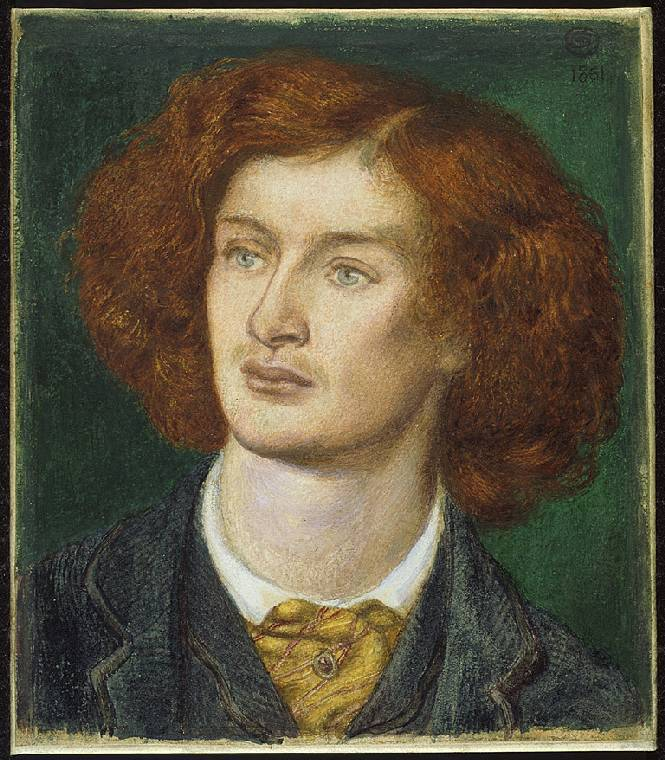
Algernon Charles Swinburne

"Dolores", subtitled "Notre-Dame des Sept Douleurs", is a poem by A. C. Swinburne first published in his 1866 Poems and Ballads. The poem, in 440 lines, regards the figure of the titular "Dolores, Our Lady of Pain", thus named at the close of many of its stanzas.

== Themes ==
The speaker of the poem is the voice of a besotted lover, faced with, and lamenting, Swinburne's particular ruthless and grim representation of the sacred feminine, embodied here as the Lady of Pain. In these respects, the poem shares its central themes with "Satia te Sanguine" from the same 1866 collection, as does it similarly share its sadomasochistic imagery with that poem and many others within Swinburne's corpus.

== Meter ==
The poem's meter is a fairly regular anapestic trimeter with some use of iambs and the final line of each stanza containing only two feet. It uses an eight line stanza with the rhyme scheme ABABCDCD and regularly uses feminine rhyme for the A and C rhymes, often rhyming the name "Dolores". A considerable quantity of catalexis is present, but this is fairly regular in its application. The poem, like a number of others by Swinburne, is notable for its use of anapestic verse to create a serious and somber mood rather than the comic effect for which anapests are more commonly encountered in English, as in the limerick.

== Controversial aspects ==
The poem demonstrates most of the controversial themes for which Swinburne became notorious. It conflates the cruel yet libidinous pagan goddess figure of Dolores, the Lady of Pain with Mary, Mother of Jesus and associates the poem itself, through its parenthetical titular text (Notre-Dame des Sept Douleurs, i.e., "Our Lady of Seven Sorrows") with the Seven Dolours of the Virgin. It laments the passing of the worship of classical deities in favour of Christian morality (277 What ailed us, O gods, to desert you | For creeds that refuse and restrain?), a theme more fully elaborated in Swinburne's "Hymn to Proserpine". Finally, sadomasochistic themes and characteristics are attributed to the Lady of Pain throughout (397 I could hurt thee — but pain would delight thee, etc.)

== Related works ==
The poem was parodied in 1872 by Arthur Clement Hilton, then a student at Cambridge, in his poem "Octopus", which substitutes the character of the Lady of Pain for that of the titular mollusc. Where Swinburne begins his poem, in describing the Lady of Pain, "Cold eyelids that hide like a jewel | Hard eyes that grow soft for an hour", Hilton begins "Strange beauty, eight-limbed and eight-handed, | Whence camest to dazzle our eyes?".

The Planescape campaign setting of Dungeons & Dragons features a character called the Lady of Pain, which was inspired by the poem's central character, as explored by author Troy Denning in his 1997 novel Pages of Pain which directly quotes Dolores and reimagines many elements of the poem into the narrative.

The short comics story "How They Met Themselves", by Neil Gaiman (originally published in Vertigo: Winter's Edge #3, reprinted in Absolute Sandman Volume III, pp. 510-519), tells how Swinburne wrote the poem after meeting Desire, who only told him that its name begins with a "D".

In his book Dylan's Visions of Sin, literary critic Christopher Ricks shows many parallels and a possible influence on Bob Dylan's song "Sad Eyed Lady of the Lowlands".

The fourth stanza of the poem was read by the character Persephone in a cinematic in the MMORG The Matrix Online.

== See also ==
- Poems and Ballads
- Decadent movement
- "Hymn to Proserpine"
- "The Triumph of Time"
