= Ethical monotheism =

God conceived as the source of ethics and morality

Ethical monotheism is a form of exclusive monotheism in which God is believed to be the only god as well as the source for one's standards of morality, guiding humanity through ethical principles.

== Definition ==
Despite any claims of priority on behalf of Zoroastrianism, ethical monotheism originated within Judaism. The concept is present in various other monotheistic religions, such as Zoroastrianism, Christianity, the Baháʼí Faith, Sikhism, and Islam. All of these monotheistic religions include the belief in one Supreme Being as the ultimate authority and creator of the universe. In Christianity, God is worshipped as the Trinity or according to Nontrinitarian conceptions of God. In monotheistic religions, other deities are variously considered to be false or demonic, and it is believed that any other gods cannot be compared to the one that they respectively regard as the only true God.

== See also ==
- Argument from morality
- Atenism
- Baháʼí Faith and the unity of religion
- Baháʼí moral teachings
- Christian ethics
- Comparative religion
- Demiurge
- Dhimmi
- Dystheism
- Evil God challenge
- God in Abrahamic religions
  - God in the Baháʼí Faith
  - God in Christianity
  - God in Judaism
  - God in Islam
- God in Sikhism
- God in Zoroastrianism
- Jewish ethics
- Judeo-Christian ethics
- Maltheism
- Moralistic therapeutic deism
- Morality in Islam
- Natural religion
- Outline of theology
- Problem of evil
- Problem of Hell
- Seven Laws of Noah
  - Ger toshav (resident alien)
  - Noahidism
- Theodicy
- Urmonotheismus (primitive monotheism)
- Violence in the Bible
- Violence in the Quran

== Bibliography ==
- Benor, Ehud (2018). Ethical Monotheism: A Philosophy of Judaism. London: Routledge. ISBN 9780367892159.
- Grossman, Maxine; Sommer, Benjamin D. (2011). "GOD". In Berlin, Adele (ed.). The Oxford Dictionary of the Jewish Religion (2nd ed.). Oxford and New York: Oxford University Press. pp. 294–297. doi:10.1093/acref/9780199730049.001.0001. ISBN 9780199759279. LCCN 2010035774.
- Tzvi Langermann, Y., ed. (2011). Monotheism & Ethics: Historical and Contemporary Intersections among Judaism, Christianity, and Islam. Studies on the Children of Abraham. Vol. 2. Leiden: Brill Publishers. ISBN 978-90-04-19429-8.
