= The Leper =

The Leper may refer to:

- "The Leper" (poem), an 1866 poem by Algernon Charles Swinburne
- The Leper (film), a 1936 Polish romantic drama film
