= Anactoria =

Woman mentioned by Sappho

Anactoria (or Anaktoria; Ancient Greek: Ἀνακτορία) is a woman mentioned in the work of the ancient Greek poet Sappho. Sappho, who wrote in the late seventh and early sixth centuries BCE, names Anactoria as the object of her desire in a poem numbered as fragment 16. Another of her poems, fragment 31, is traditionally called the "Ode to Anactoria", although no name appears in it. As portrayed by Sappho, Anactoria is likely to have been an aristocratic follower of hers, of marriageable age. It is possible that fragment 16 was written in connection with her wedding to an unknown man. The name "Anactoria" has also been argued to have been a pseudonym, perhaps of a woman named Anagora from Miletus, or an archetypal creation of Sappho's imagination.

The English poet Algernon Charles Swinburne's "Anactoria" was published in his 1866 collection, Poems and Ballads. "Anactoria" is written from the point of view of Sappho, who addresses the title character in a long monologue written in rhyming couplets of iambic pentameter. The monologue expresses Sappho's lust for her in sexually explicit terms; she first rejects art and the gods for Anactoria's love before reversing her stance and claiming to reject Anactoria in favour of poetry. Swinburne's poem created a sensation by openly approaching then-taboo topics such as lesbianism and dystheism. Anactoria later featured in an 1896 play by H. V. Sutherland and in the 1961 poetic series "Three Letters to Anaktoria" by Robert Lowell, in which an unnamed man loves her before transferring, unrequitedly, his affections to Sappho.

== In Sappho ==
Some say an army of horsemen, others
say foot soldiers, still others say a fleet
is the finest thing on the dark earth.
I say it is whatever one loves.

Everyone can understand this – consider
that Helen, far surpassing the beauty
of mortals, left behind
the best man of all

to sail away to Troy. She remembered
neither daughter nor dear parents,
as [Aphrodite] led her away

. . . [un]bending . . . mind
. . . lightly . . . thinks.
. . . reminding me now
of Anaktoria gone.

I would rather see her lovely step
and the radiant sparkle of her face
than all the war chariots in Lydia
and soldiers battling in arms.

Impossible . . . to happen
. . . human, but to pray for a share
. . . and for myself

— Sappho 16, translated by Diane Rayor

Anactoria is named by the ancient Greek poet Sappho, who wrote in the late seventh and early sixth centuries BCE and is known for her love poetry, in fragment 16. (Note: Sappho's poetry survives almost entirely in untitled fragments, which are known by numbers in modern editions. See Gordon 2002, pp. v–vii, and Goff & Harloe 2021, p. 396.) Sappho compares her desire for Anactoria, who is described as being absent, with that of Helen of Troy for Paris. (Note: Purves 2021, p. 176. For a translation of the poem, see Spraggs 2006a. For Sappho's dates, see Kivilo 2010, p. 198, n. 174) (Note: Ilja Leonard Pfeijffer argues that Sappho also implicitly compares Anactoria with Helen, both emphasising her beauty and associating Sappho with Helen's rightful husband, Menelaus.) A second poem, fragment 31, is traditionally called the "Ode to Anactoria", though no name appears in it. (Note: Wharton 1908, pp. 25, 35–36; Prins 2020, p. 66 (for the name and its traditional nature); Spraggs 2006b (for the poem's text).) It has also been speculated that Anactoria may be the unnamed character in fragment 96, written to another of Sappho's female companions, possibly Atthis. (Note: Greenberg 1991, pp. 80–81; Barnstone 2010, p. 305. Greenberg numbers the fragment as 141, following Barnstone 1962. For the identification of Atthis, see Rayor & Lardinois 2014, p. 124.) In that poem, Sappho claims that the unnamed character still "thinks of [Sappho] constantly" despite living away in the city of Sardis. (Note: Bruno Lavagnini speculated in 1937 that the absent character was Anactoria, and that she had gone to become a consort of the Lydian king Alyattes in Sardis. Denys Page states that there is no textual evidence in Sappho on which to base this assertion, or for the putative identification of the character with Anactoria.)

In the phrasing of Garry Wills, fragment 16 portrays Anactoria as "menacingly desirable". Sappho describes her manner of walking as attractive, and her face as having amarychma, a word literally meaning 'flashing' or 'sparkling' and likely also to indicate beauty in movement. Based on its allusions to other literary works, particularly those of Hesiod, the term may also indicate that Anactoria was a young, virgin girl of marriageable age. The Anactoria portrayed in Sappho's work is generally considered to have been a follower of Sappho, who educated aristocratic girls with the partial aim of preparing them for marriage. (Note: An interpretation popular in the nineteenth and early twentieth centuries, that Sappho held a formal post as a teacher or "schoolmistress", is generally considered anachronistic and unsupported by the available evidence. The distinction between Sappho's "companions" and "pupils", established in the Suda, is unlikely to have reflected reality: if Sappho did have a pedagogical role, which is not evidenced in her own writings, it is likely that it overlapped with her personal and erotic relationships.)

A reference to "Anagora" in the Suda, a tenth-century Byzantine encyclopaedia, is generally considered to refer to Anactoria; the name "Anagora" has been interpreted as an error in the manuscripts, or alternatively by Denys Page as the real name of "Anactoria", to whom Page conjectures Sappho gave a pseudonym to protect her identity and reputation. The Suda names "Anagora" as a native of Miletus, a major Greek city of Ionia. (Note: Anaktoria was an alternative name for Miletus: various traditions linked the name to a mythical king named Anax.) Christopher Brown suggests that Anactoria's absence in fragment 16 was because she had left Sappho's company to return to Miletus and marry; Eric Dodson-Robinson suggests that fragment 16 may have been written for performance at Anactoria's wedding, or for a sympotic event shortly after it. However, George Koniaris suggests that Anactoria may equally have left Sappho's company to be with her family or to work as a musician, and Glenn Most points out that the poem gives no indication of the length of Anactoria's absence: he argues that it may only have been a matter of a few days. Martin West has argued that Sappho generally uses the name of the objects of her desire, such as Anactoria, when portraying their relationship with her as finished or her own attitude towards it as hostile.

Sappho's expressed love for Anactoria is one of few examples of a woman expressing same-sex desire to survive from pre-modern literature. Andrew Ford has argued that Sappho's presentation of Anactoria may be archetypal rather than a representation of any specific individual, while Judith Hallett and André Lardinois have suggested that the speaker may not have been intended as an autobiographical portrayal of Sappho herself. The classicist and archaeologist David Moore Robinson called the description of Anactoria in fragment 16 "the finest lines in all Sappho's poetry".

== Reception ==
=== In classical literature ===
Anactoria is almost unattested in ancient sources outside Sappho's works. She is mentioned in a poem traditionally attributed to the first-century BCE Roman poet Ovid; the fifteenth of his Heroides. (Note: The authorship of the poem is unclear: several scholars dispute the traditional identification of Ovid as the author. Charles E. Murgia has suggested that it was written after Ovid's Epistula ex Ponto and before the tragedies of Seneca (who died in 65 CE), possibly by an unknown poet of the generation after Ovid.) The poem is imagined as a letter from Sappho to her male lover Phaon, in which Sappho claims that her love for Phaon has made her former, female lovers, including Anactoria, seem worthless to her. In the second century CE, the rhetorician Maximus of Tyre compared the relationship between Sappho and Anactoria with that of the philosopher Socrates and his male acolytes such as Alcibiades. Both Maximus and the Suda list Anactoria as a favourite pupil of Sappho's.

=== In modern culture ===
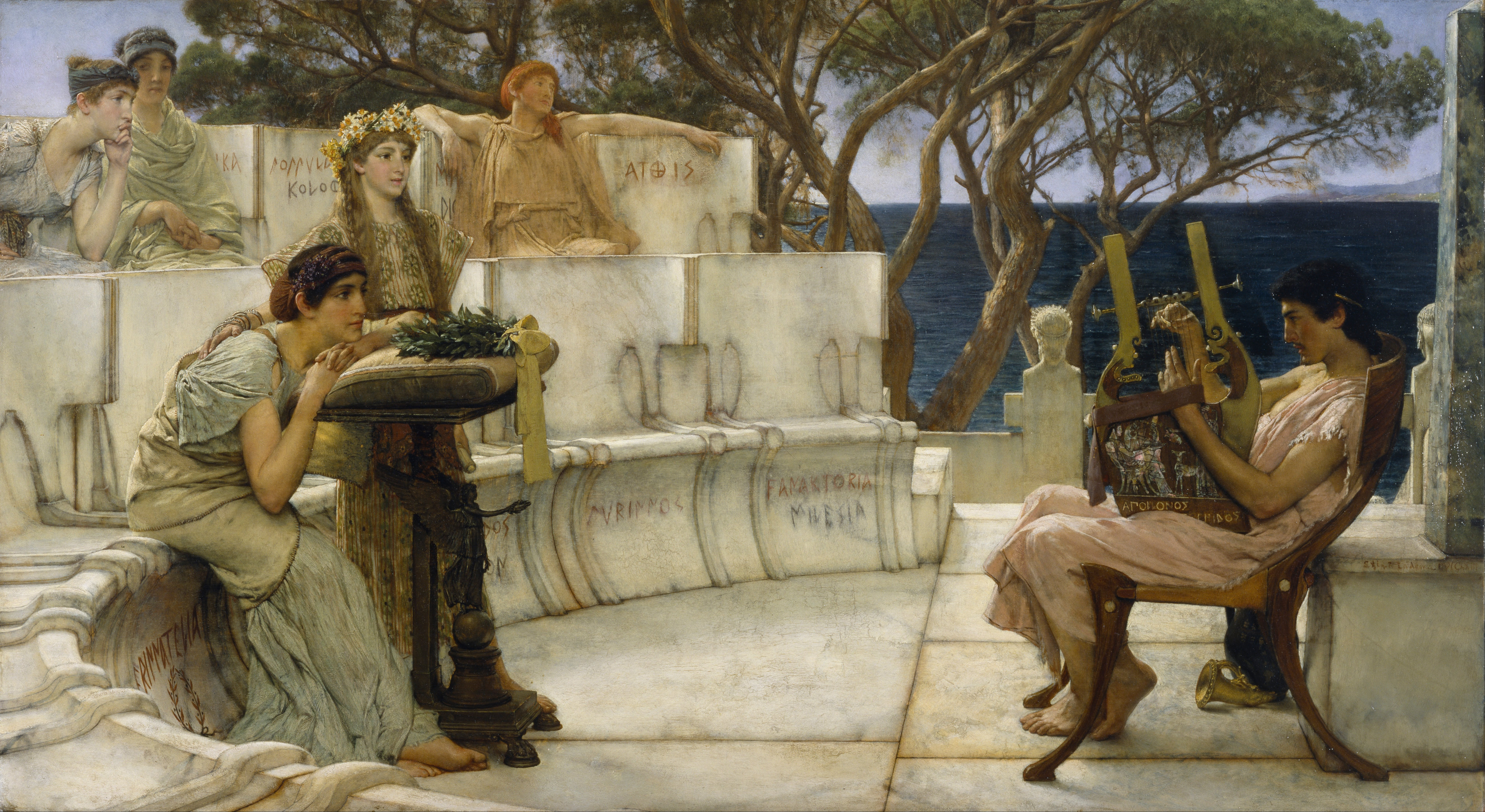
Sappho and Alcaeus (1881), painted by Lawrence Alma-Tadema. Anactoria's name is visible near the middle of the painting. (Note: The digamma (Ϝ) written at the start of Anactoria's name, with a sound value similar to the English w, is unlikely to have been pronounced in Sappho's dialect.)

The nineteenth-century English poet Algernon Charles Swinburne wrote a long poem, "Anactoria", published in his 1866 collection Poems and Ballads. The poem is written from the point of view of Sappho, who addresses Anactoria in a long monologue written in rhyming couplets of iambic pentameter, which incorporates fragments from Sappho's poetry: the poem's first line is "My life is bitter with thy love", which alludes to fragment 130. "Anactoria" presents Sappho's love and lust for Anactoria as the source of her poetic inspiration. In the conceit of the poem, Anactoria is about to leave Sappho, and Sappho initially longs for the goddess Aphrodite to return Anactoria to her. By the end, however, Sappho rejects Anactoria and the gods in favour of poetry, which she had initially proclaimed herself willing to sacrifice for Anactoria's love. Catherine Maxwell has described both Anactoria and Sappho as poetic representations of Swinburne himself. (Note: Swinburne, in a letter of 1880, described Sappho as "the greatest poet that ever was at all".)

The poem was both sensational and controversial for its treatment of taboo topics such as lesbianism, cannibalism and dystheism, as well as for its parody of both Sapphic and Biblical texts. Its content is sexually explicit and sadomasochistic; it was termed "frankly pornographic" in a 1971 article by David Cook. Swinburne's publication of "Anactoria", along with that of his "Sapphics", led to what Lawrence Lipking has termed his "ostracism". Catherine Maxwell and Stefano Evangelista have described "Anactoria" as both "infamous" and among Swinburne's most famous poems. Later critics have read it as a commentary on Romantic poetic authority, a critique of Victorian sexual and religious orthodoxies, and a meditation upon Sappho's position in history and literature.

While a student at Harvard University, H. V. Sutherland wrote a verse drama, Sappho, or Archilochus and Hipponax, which was performed by Harvard and Wellesley students in January 1896. In the play, Anactoria is initially loved by the poet Alcaeus, who leaves her for Sappho. In his 1961 collection Imitations, the American poet Robert Lowell wrote "Three Letters to Anaktoria", a series of poems including an adaptation of Sappho's fragment 31 as its first. In Lowell's poems, the unnamed, hypothetical man alluded to in fragment 31 becomes the main subject of the series: he loves Anaktoria, transfers his affections to Sappho, and later, in Lowell's words, "withdraws or dies". In painting, Anactoria's name is inscribed on one of the seats of the theatre depicted in the 1881 work Sappho and Alcaeus by Lawrence Alma-Tadema.

== Works cited ==
- Barnstone, Willis (1962). Greek Lyric Poetry. Bloomington: Indiana University Press. OCLC 2771762.
- Barnstone, Willis (2010). Greek Lyric Poetry. Introduction by William E. McCulloh. Bloomington: Indiana University Press. ISBN 978-0-253-00389-8.
- Brown, Christopher (1989). "Anactoria and the Χαρίτων ἀμαρύγματα". Quaderni Urbinati di Cultura Classica. 32 (2): 7–15. doi:10.2307/20546993. ISSN 0033-4987. JSTOR 20546993.
- Campbell, D. A. (1967). Greek Lyric Poetry: A Selection of Early Greek Lyric, Elegiac and Iambic Poetry. London: Macmillan. OCLC 867865631.
- Cook, David A. (1971). "The Content and Meaning of Swinburne's 'Anactoria'". Victorian Poetry. 9 (1/2): 77–93. ISSN 1530-7190. JSTOR 40001590.
- Dellamora, Richard (1990). Masculine Desire: The Sexual Politics of Victorian Aestheticism. Chapel Hill: University of North Carolina Press. ISBN 0-8078-4267-2 – via Internet Archive.
- Dodson-Robinson, Eric (2010). "Helen's 'Judgement of Paris' and Greek Marriage Ritual in Sappho 16". Arethusa. 43 (1): 1–20. doi:10.1353/are.0.0032. hdl:2152/34292. ISSN 1080-6504. JSTOR 44578316.
- Ford, Andrew L. (2011). Aristotle as Poet: The Song for Hermias and Its Contexts. Oxford University Press. ISBN 978-0-19-973329-3.
- Goff, Barbara; Harloe, Katherine (2021). "Sappho in the 20th Century and Beyond". In Finglass, P. J.; Kelly, Adrian (eds.). The Cambridge Companion to Sappho. Cambridge University Press. doi:10.1017/9781316986974. hdl:2066/241243. ISBN 978-1-316-63877-4.
- Gordon, Pamela (2002). "Introduction". In Warden, Susan (ed.). Sappho: Poems and Fragments. Translated by Stanley Lombardo. Indianapolis: Hackett. pp. v–xxv. ISBN 0-87220-591-6.
- Greenberg, Robert A. (1991). "'Erotion', 'Anactoria', and the Sapphic Passion". Victorian Poetry. 29 (1): 79–87. ISSN 1530-7190. JSTOR 40002057.
- Hallett, Judith (1979). "Sappho and Her Social Context: Sense and Sensuality". Signs. 4 (3): 447–464. doi:10.1086/493630. ISSN 0097-9740. JSTOR 3173393.
- Johnson, Marguerite (2012). "The Role of Eros in Improving the Pupil, or What Socrates Learned from Sappho". In Johnson, Marguerite; Tarrant, Harold (eds.). Alcibiades and the Socratic Lover-Educator. London: Bloomsbury Academic. pp. 7–29. ISBN 978-1-4725-0446-3.
- Kivilo, Maarit (2010). Early Greek Poets' Lives: The Shaping of the Tradition. Leiden: Brill. ISBN 978-90-04-19328-4.
- Klinck, Anne L. (2008). "Sappho's Company of Friends". Hermes. 136 (1): 15–29. doi:10.25162/hermes-2008-0002. ISSN 0018-0777. JSTOR 40379149.
- Koniaris, George L. (1967). "On Sappho, Fr. 16 (L. P.)". Hermes. 95 (3): 257–268. ISSN 0018-0777. JSTOR 4475462.
- Lardinois, André (2021). "Sappho's Personal Poetry". In Finglass, P. J.; Kelly, Adrian (eds.). The Cambridge Companion to Sappho. Cambridge University Press. pp. 163–174. doi:10.1017/9781316986974. hdl:2066/241243. ISBN 978-1-316-98697-4.
- Lardinois, André (2022). "Sappho". In Swift, Laura (ed.). A Companion to Greek Lyric. Oxford: Wiley. pp. 261–274. ISBN 978-1-119-12262-3.
- Lavagnini, Bruno (1937). Aglaia: nuova antologia della lirica greca da Callino a Bacchilide [Aglaia: New Anthology of Greek Lyric from Callinus to Bacchylides] (in Italian). Turin: Paravia. OL 19751504M.
- Lipking, Lawrence I. (1988). Abandoned Women and Poetic Tradition. University of Chicago Press. ISBN 0-226-48452-1.
- Maxwell, Catherine (2001). The Female Sublime from Milton to Swinburne: Bearing Blindness. Manchester University Press. ISBN 978-0-7190-5752-6.
- Maxwell, Catherine; Evangelista, Stefano (2013). "Introduction". In Maxwell, Catherine; Evangelista, Stefano (eds.). Algernon Charles Swinburne: Unofficial Laureate. University of Manchester Press. pp. 1–12. ISBN 978-1-5261-3048-8.
- MacLachlan, Bonnie C. (1997). "Personal Poetry". In Gerber, Douglas E. (ed.). A Companion to the Greek Lyric Poets. Leiden: Brill. pp. 133–220. ISBN 90-04-09944-1.
- Morgan, Thaïs E. (1984). "Swinburne's Dramatic Monologues: Sex and Ideology". Victorian Poetry. 22 (2): 175–195. ISSN 1530-7190. JSTOR 40002965.
- Most, Glenn (1981). "Sappho Fr. 16. 6-7L-P". The Classical Quarterly. 31 (1): 1–17. doi:10.1017/S0009838800021030. ISSN 0009-8388. JSTOR 638456 – via Academia.edu.
- Most, Glenn (1996). "Reflecting Sappho". In Greene, Ellen (ed.). Re-Reading Sappho: Reception and Transmission. Berkeley: University of California Press. pp. 11–35. ISBN 978-0-520-20603-8.
- Murgia, Charles E. (1985). "Imitation and Authenticity in Ovid: Metamorphoses 1.477 and Heroides 15". The American Journal of Philology. 106 (4): 456–474. doi:10.2307/295197. ISSN 0002-9475. JSTOR 295197.
- Page, Denys (1955). Sappho and Alcaeus: An Introduction to the Study of Ancient Lesbian Poetry. Oxford University Press. OCLC 848510784.
- Parker, Sarah (2013). "Whose Muse? Sappho, Swinburne, and Amy Lowell". In Maxwell, Catherine; Evangelista, Stefano (eds.). Algernon Charles Swinburne: Unofficial Laureate. University of Manchester Press. pp. 193–212. ISBN 978-1-5261-3048-8.
- Pfeijffer, Ilja Leonard (2000). "Shifting Helen: An Interpretation of Sappho, Fragment 16 (Voigt)". The Classical Quarterly. 50 (1): 1–6. doi:10.1093/cq/50.1.1. ISSN 0009-8388. JSTOR 1558930.
- Prins, Yopie (1996). "Sappho's Afterlife in Translation". In Greene, Ellen (ed.). Re-Reading Sappho: Reception and Transmission. Berkeley: University of California Press. pp. 36–67. ISBN 978-0-520-20603-8.
- Prins, Yopie (2020). Victorian Sappho. Princeton University Press. ISBN 978-0-691-05919-8.
- Purves, Alex (2021). "Sappho's Lyric Sensibility". In Finglass, P. J.; Kelly, Adrian (eds.). The Cambridge Companion to Sappho. Cambridge University Press. pp. 175–189. doi:10.1017/9781316986974. hdl:2066/241243. ISBN 978-1-316-98697-4.
- Rayor, Diane J.; Lardinois, André (2014). Sappho: A New Translation of the Complete Works. Cambridge University Press. ISBN 978-1-108-92697-3.
- Rimell, Victoria (1999). "Epistolary Fictions: Authorial Identity in Heroides 15". Proceedings of the Cambridge Philological Society. 45: 109–135. doi:10.1017/S0068673500002364. ISSN 2053-5899. JSTOR 44696750.
- Robinson, David Moore (1963). Sappho and Her Influence. Our Debt to Greece and Rome. London: George G. Harrap and Co. OCLC 405245 – via Internet Archive.
- Rosati, Gianpiero (1996). "Sabinus, the Heroides and the Poet-Nightingale. Some Observations on the Authenticity of the Epistula Sapphus". The Classical Quarterly. 46 (1): 207–216. doi:10.1093/cq/46.1.207. ISSN 0009-8388. JSTOR 639573.
- Rupp, Leila J. (2012). "Sexual Fluidity 'Before Sex'". Signs. 37 (4): 849–856. doi:10.1086/664470. ISSN 0097-9740. JSTOR 10.1086/664470.
- Sappho: Fragment 16. Translated by Spraggs, Gillian. 2006a [1998].
- Sappho: Fragment 31. Translated by Spraggs, Gillian. 2006b [1998].
- Schmitz, Leonhard (1870). Smith, William (ed.). "Anax" . A Dictionary of Greek and Roman Biography and Mythology. Vol. 1. Boston: Little, Brown and Company. p. 180 . OCLC 681106410 – via Wikisource.
- Tarrant, Richard J. (1981). "The Authenticity of the Letter of Sappho to Phaon (Heroides XV)". Harvard Studies in Classical Philology. 85: 133–153. doi:10.2307/311169. ISSN 0073-0688. JSTOR 311169.
- Wagner-Lawlor, Jennifer (1996). "Metaphorical 'Indiscretion' and Literary Survival in Swinburne's 'Anactoria'". SEL: Studies in English Literature 1500–1900. 36 (4): 917–934. ISSN 1522-9270. JSTOR 450982.
- West, Martin Litchfield (1970). "Burning Sappho". Maia. 22: 307–330. ISSN 0025-0538.
- Wharton, Henry Thornton (1908) [1885]. Sappho: Memoir, Text, Selected Renderings, and a Literal Translation (Fifth ed.). London: John Lane. OCLC 4398974 – via Project Gutenberg.
- Wills, Garry (1967). "The Sapphic 'Umwertung Aller Werte'". The American Journal of Philology. 88 (4): 434–442. doi:10.2307/292779. ISSN 0002-9475. JSTOR 292779.
- Zonana, Joyce (1990). "Swinburne's Sappho: The Muse as Sister-Goddess". Victorian Poetry. 28 (1): 39–50. ISSN 1530-7190. JSTOR 40002039.
