= Sleeping Hermaphroditus =

Ancient marble sculpture

- The Borghese Hermaphrodite
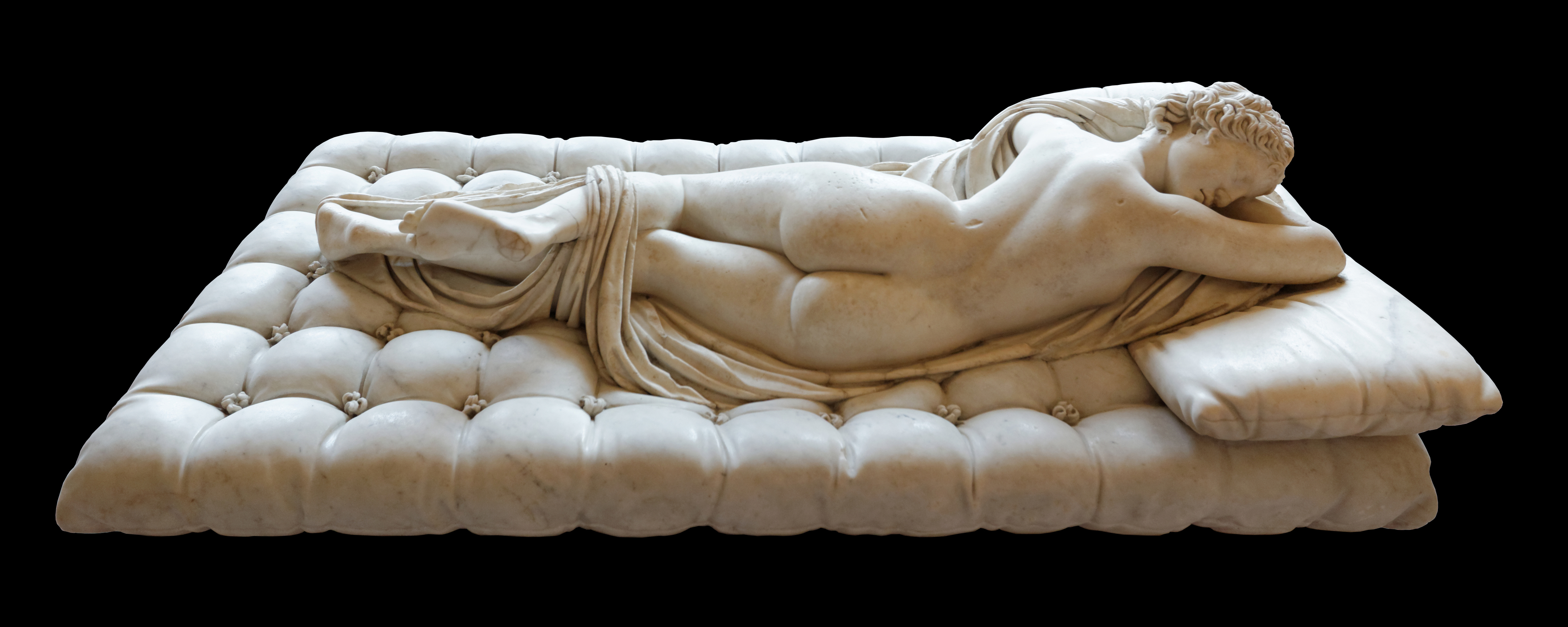
- Artists: Unknown (original sculpture); Gian Lorenzo Bernini (mattress)
- Year: c. 100–500 CE (original sculpture); 1620 (mattress)
- Type: Sculpture
- Medium: Marble
- Subject: Hermaphroditus
- Dimensions: 173.5 cm (68.3 in)
- Location: The Louvre, Paris

Sleeping Hermaphroditus or Sleeping Hermaphrodite (also, "The Borghese Hermaphrodite") is an ancient Roman marble sculpture depicting Hermaphroditus life size; it rests on a marble mattress completed by Italian artist Gian Lorenzo Bernini in 1620. The form is derived from ancient portrayals of Venus and other female nudes, and from feminized Hellenistic portrayals of Dionysus. This subject was widely repeated during the Hellenistic period and in ancient Rome, given the number of versions that have survived.

The sculpture was discovered at Santa Maria della Vittoria in Rome in 1618 and became part of the Borghese Collection. It was sold to France at the end of the 18th century and is currently on display at The Louvre, in Paris.

The Sleeping Hermaphrodite has been described as a good early Imperial Roman copy of a bronze original by the later of the two Hellenistic sculptors named Polycles (working c. 155 BC); the original bronze was mentioned in Pliny's Natural History.

== History ==
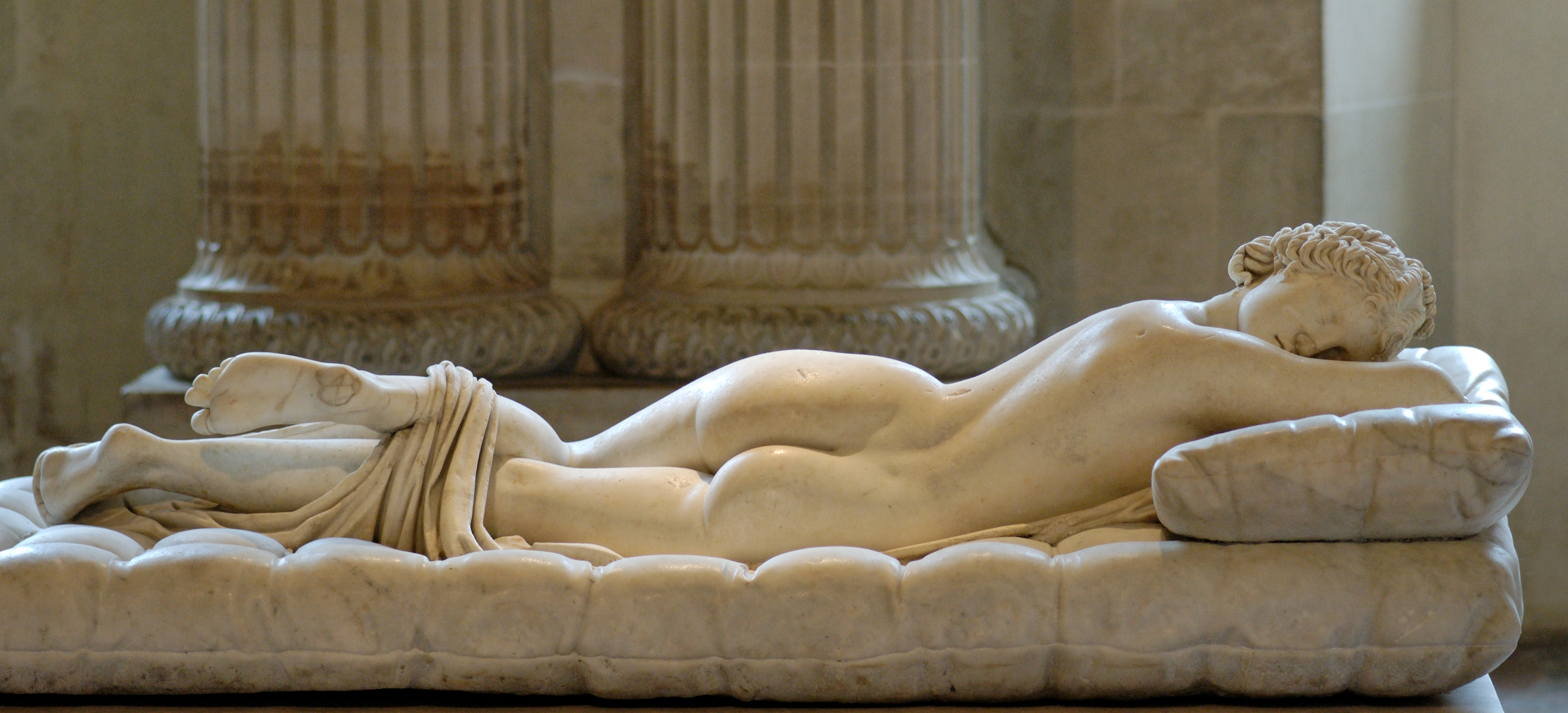
Sleeping Hermaphroditus, The Louvre, Paris

The sculpture was discovered in 1618, unearthed in the grounds of Santa Maria della Vittoria, near the Baths of Diocletian and within the bounds of the ancient Gardens of Sallust. The discovery was likely made during the excavation of church's foundation or while planting espaliers nearby.

The sculpture was presented to Cardinal Scipione Borghese, who included the work in the Borghese Collection and commissioned the mattress. Gian Lorenzo Bernini, Scipione's protégé, was paid sixty scudi for making the buttoned mattress. It's likely that Scipione dedicated an entire room of the Villa Borghese to the sculpture.

The sculpture was among the various artworks purchased by France while Rome was part of Napoleon's First French Empire. It was sold by Prince Camillo Borghese in 1807, who was married to Pauline Bonaparte, and was under significant financial strain due to the heavy taxation imposed by the French. In 1809, the sculpture was transferred to the Louvre where it is currently on display.

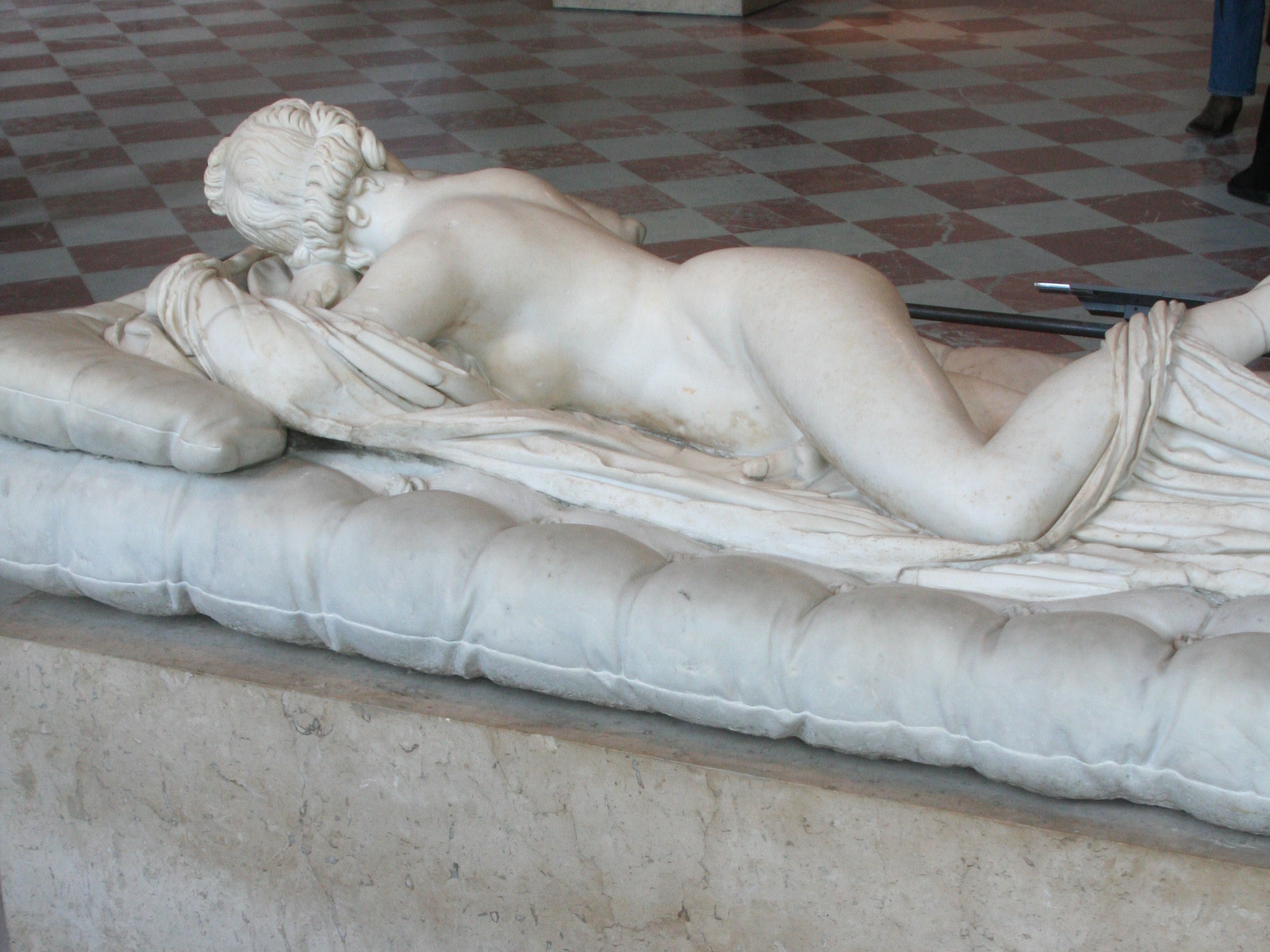
Front

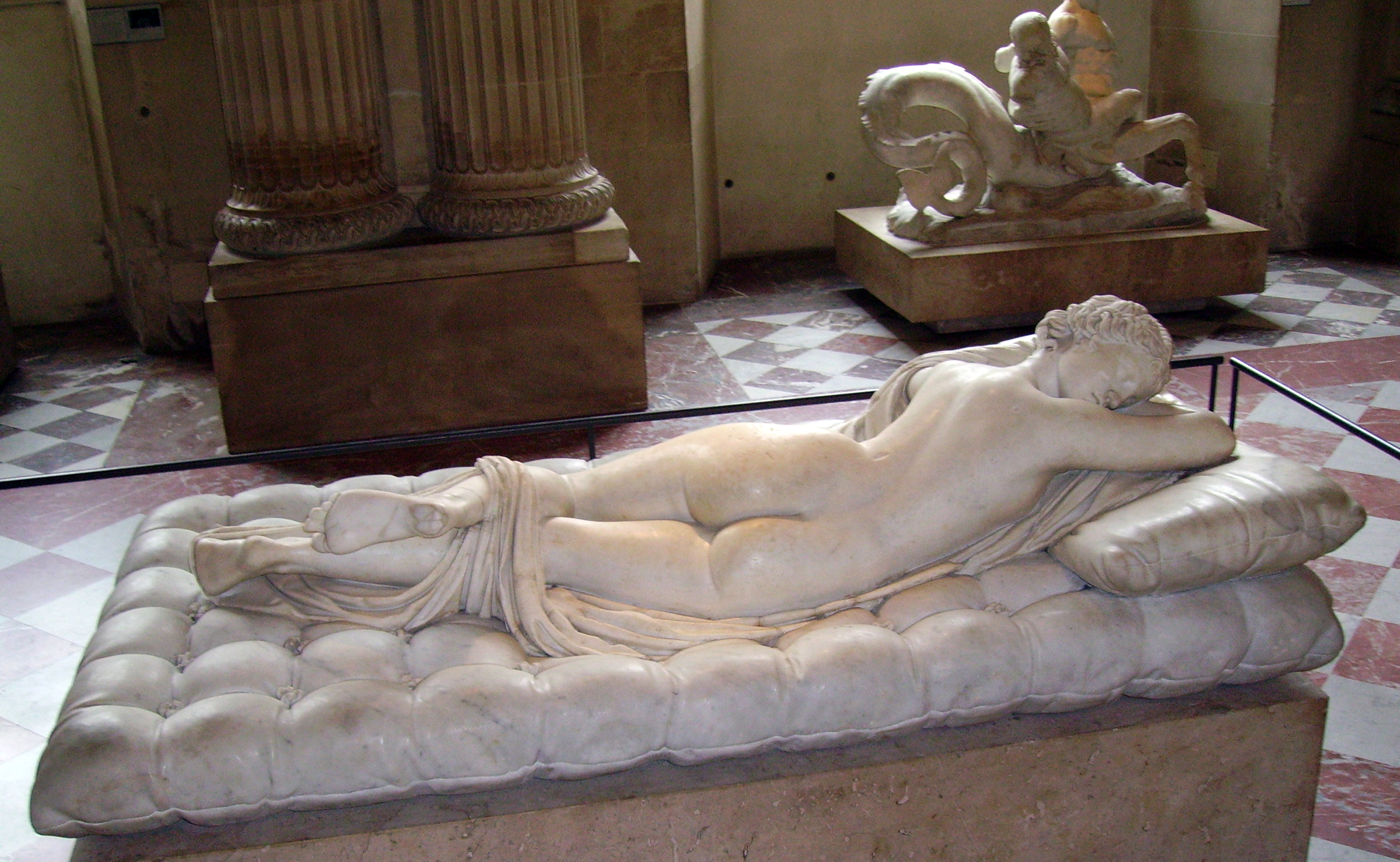
Back

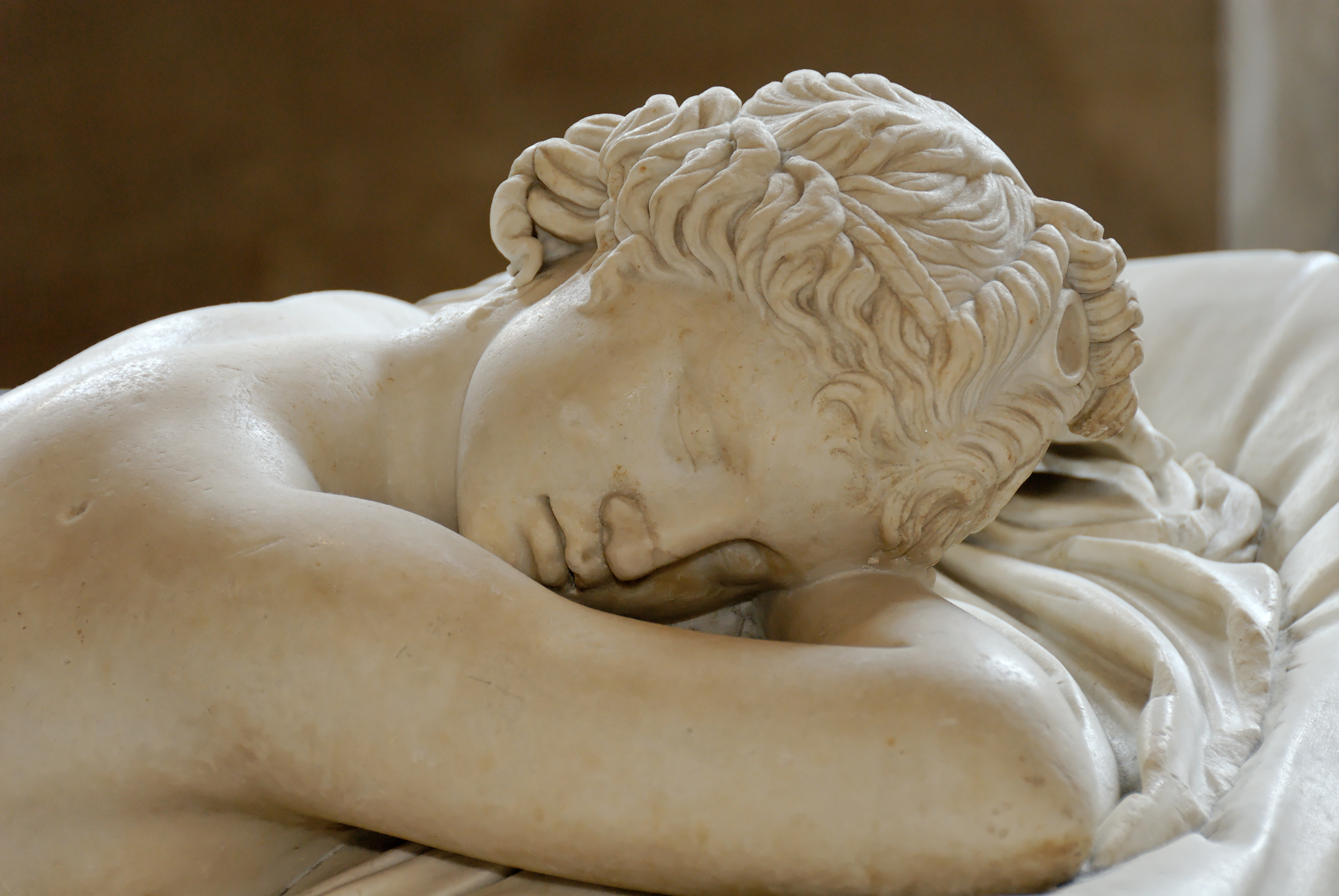
Detail

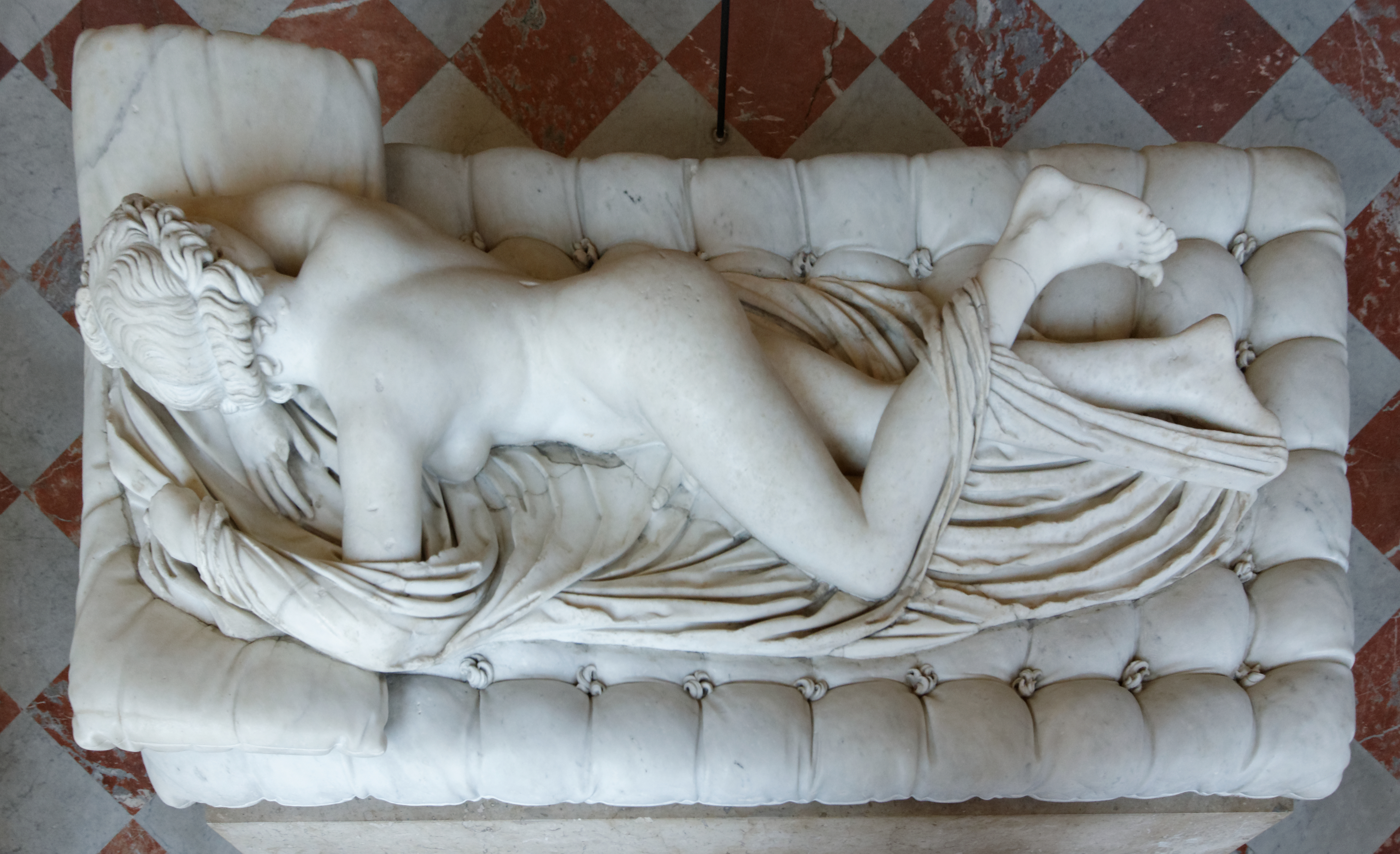
Top

== Ancient copies ==
In 1781, a second-century copy of the Sleeping Hermaphroditus was found and has taken the original's place at the Galleria Borghese. In 1880, a third Roman marble variant was discovered and is now on display at the Museo Palazzo Massimo Alle Terme, part of the National Museum of Rome. Additional ancient copies can be found at the Uffizi in Florence, Vatican Museums in Vatican City, and the Hermitage Museum in St Petersburg.

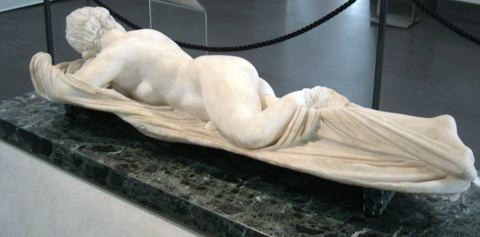
Version at National Museum of Rome (overall)

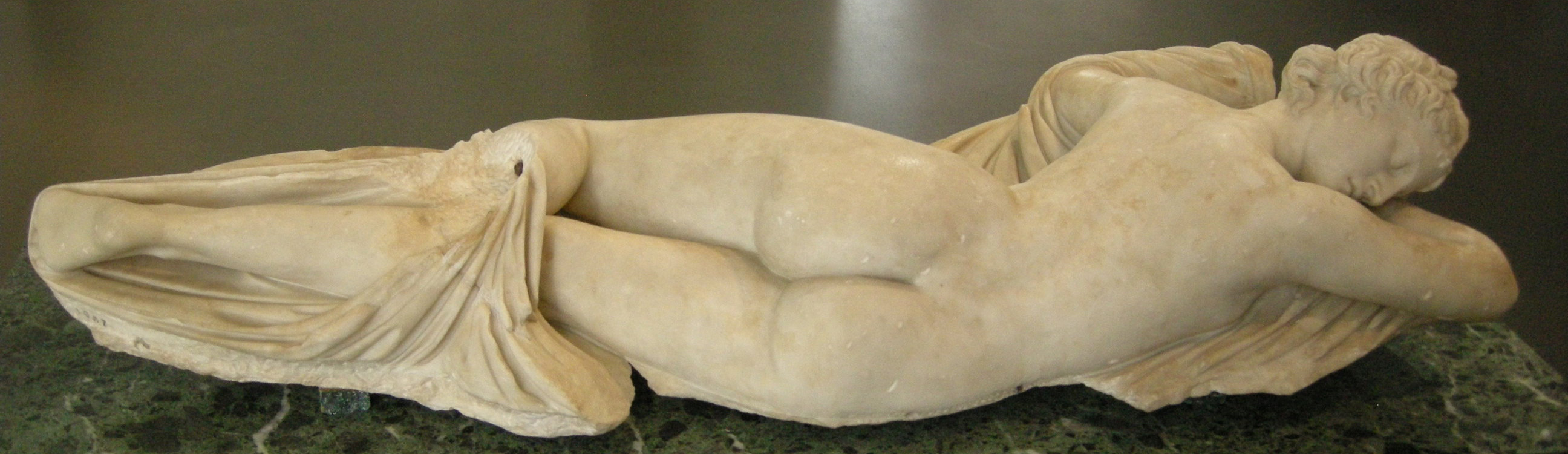
Version at National Museum of Rome (back)

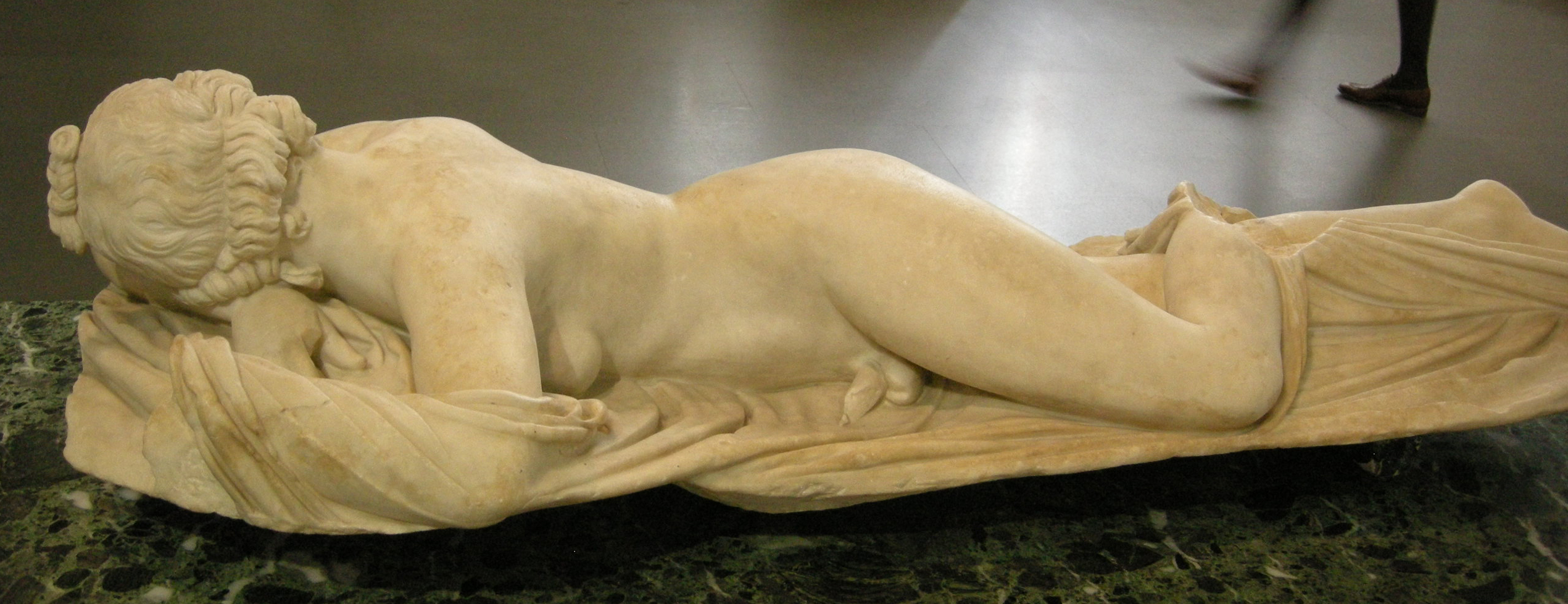
Version at National Museum of Rome (front)

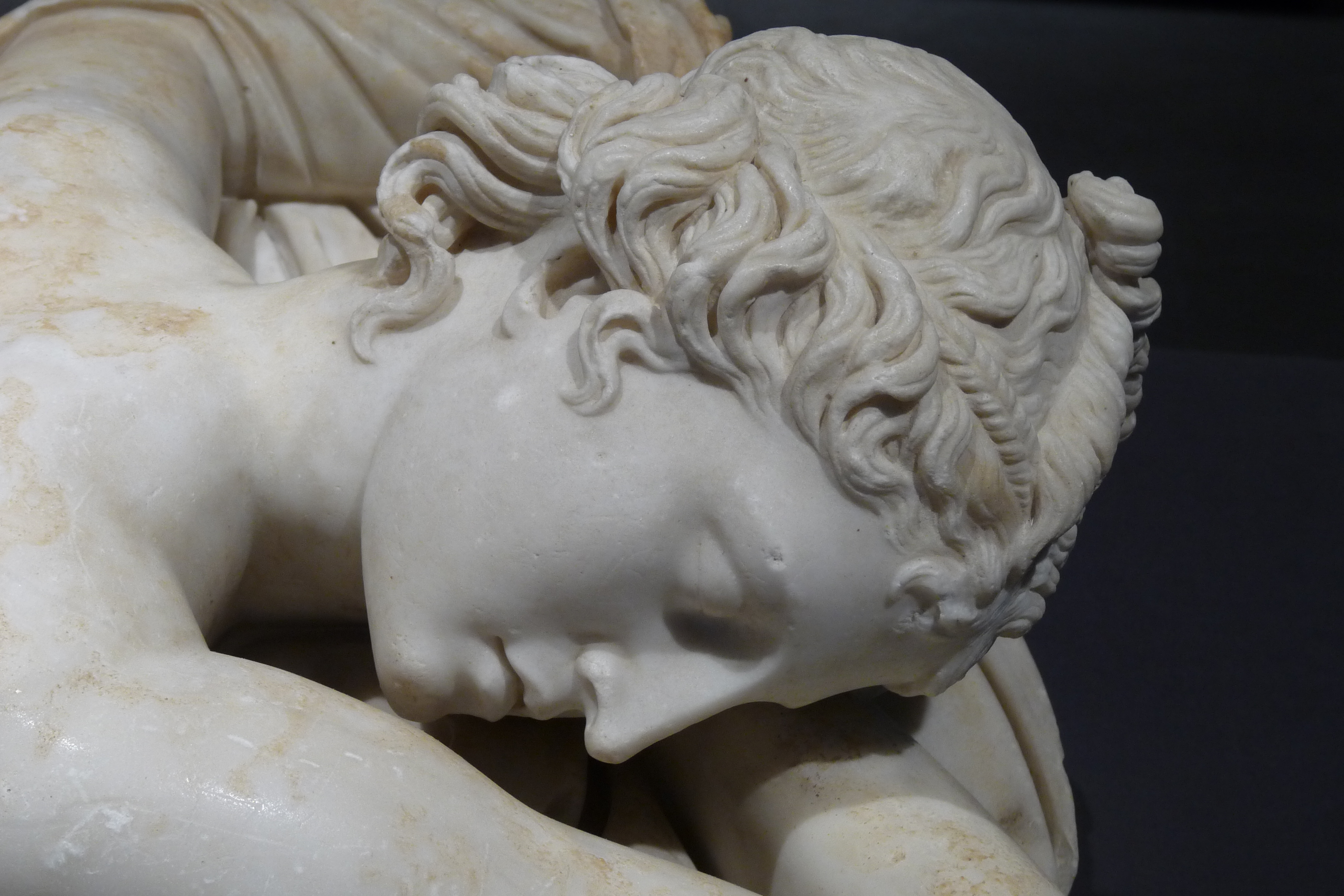
Version at National Museum of Rome (detail)

== Modern copies & inspirations ==
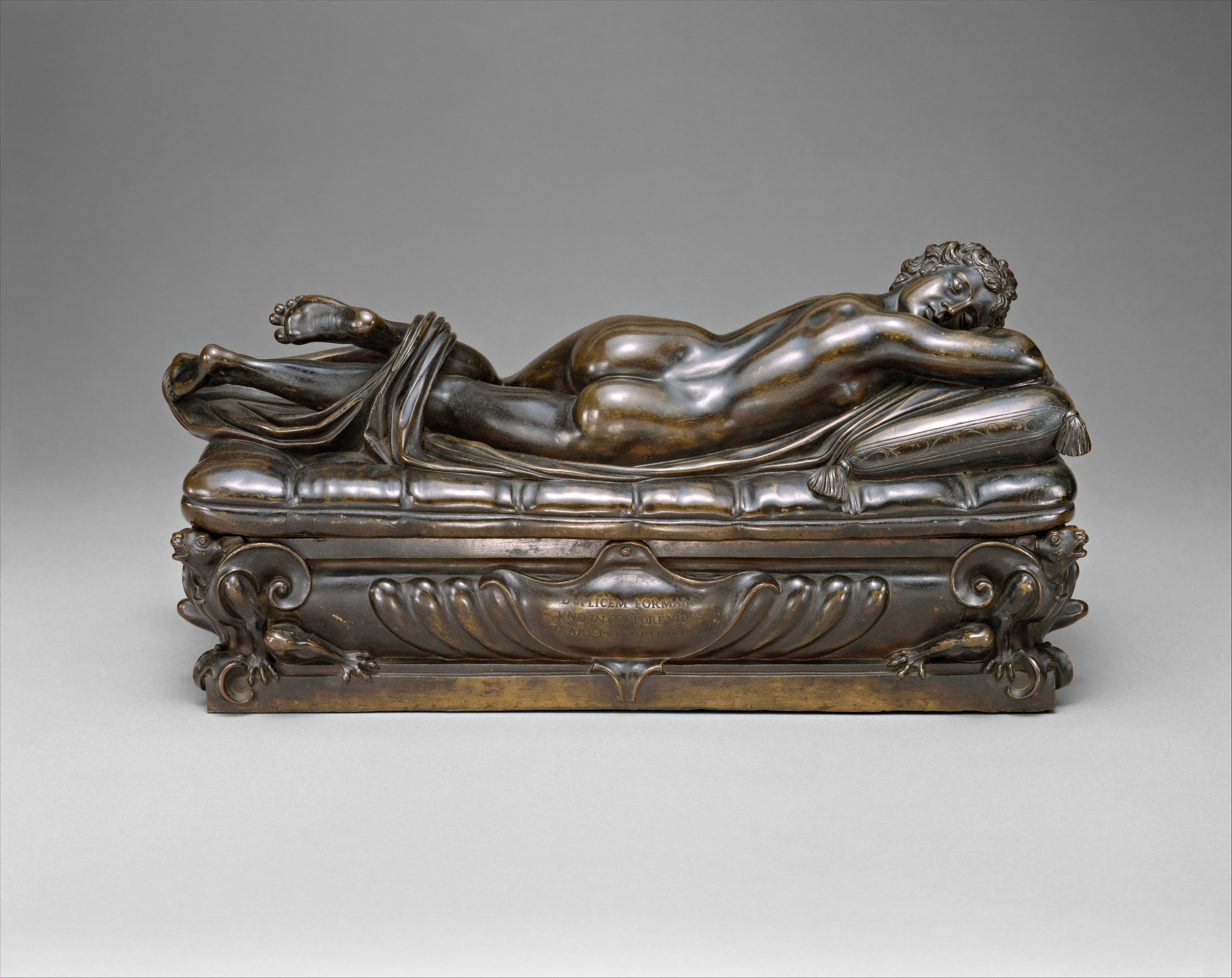
Bronze example at the Metropolitan Museum

Several copies have been produced since the Renaissance, in a variety of media and scales. Among the most notable, is a full-size, bronze version ordered by Diego Velázquez for Philip IV of Spain. It was made by Matteo Bonuccelli in 1652 and is currently housed at the Prado Museum. The sculpture clearly influenced Velázquez's painting of the Rokeby Venus, now at the National Gallery, London.

Pointing to further popularity during the 17th century, there is record of John Evelyn purchasing a reduced-scale ivory version by François Duquesnoy in Rome around 1640. In 1639, Giovanni Francesco Susini made a reduced-scale bronze copy, one cast of which is on display at the Metropolitan Museum of Art in New York. Susini went on to create two additional variations of the form in bronze; a cast of one was in the collection of Yves Saint Laurent and Pierre Bergé until sold in February 2009.

In 1863, Algernon Charles Swinburne wrote a poem titled "Hermaphroditus," subscribed Au Musée du Louvre, Mars 1863, leaving no doubt that it was inspired by seeing the work at the Louvre. The poem was published in 1866 in Poems and Ballads, Swinburne's first collection of poems.

In 2010, Barry X Ball created a life-size copy in Belgian black marble on a Carrara marble base. This sculpture sold at Christie's, New York, on 10 May 2016 for $545,000.

== See also ==
- List of works by Gian Lorenzo Bernini
- Napoleonic looting of art
