= Poems and Ballads =

Collection of poems by Algernon Charles Swinburne

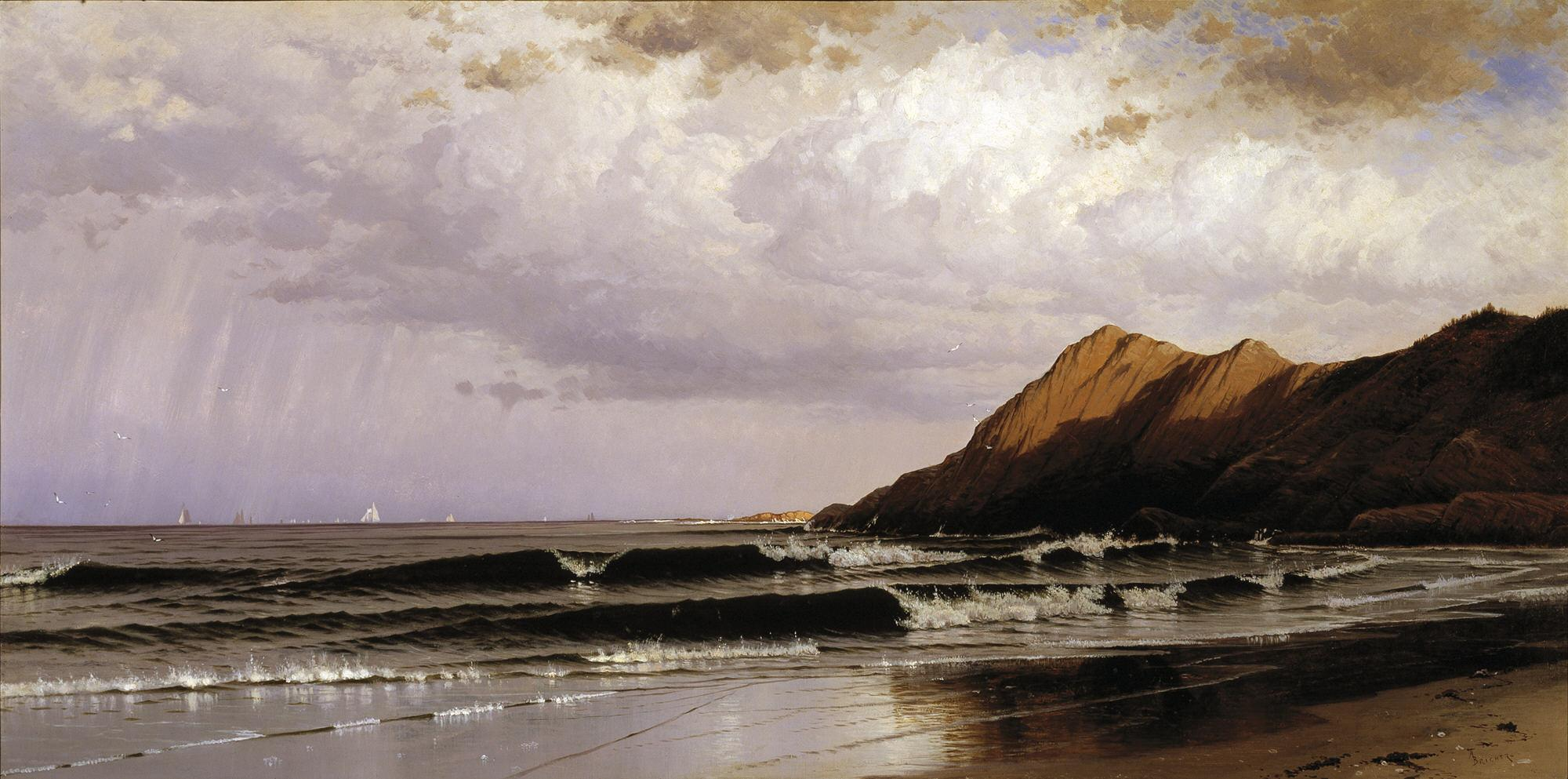
Time and Tide, Alfred Thompson Bricher, c. 1873 The sea and time are common motifs in Swinburne's poetry.

Poems and Ballads, First Series is the first collection of poems by Algernon Charles Swinburne, published in 1866. The book was instantly popular, and equally controversial. Swinburne wrote about many taboo topics, such as lesbianism, sado-masochism, and anti-theism. The poems have many common elements, such as the Ocean, Time, and Death. Several historical persons are mentioned in the poems, such as Sappho, Anactoria, Jesus (Galilaee, La. "Galilean") and Catullus.

== Poems ==
- A Ballad of Life
- A Ballad of Death
- Laus Veneris
- Phædra
- The Triumph of Time
- Les Noyades
- A Leave-Taking
- Itylus
- Anactoria
- Hymn to Proserpine
- Ilicet
- Hermaphroditus
- Fragoletta
- Rondel
- Satia te Sanguine
- A Litany
- A Lamentation
- Anima Anceps
- In the Orchard
- A Match
- Faustine
- A Cameo
- Song before Death
- Rococo
- Stage Love
- The Leper
- A Ballad of Burdens
- Rondel
- Before the Mirror
- Erotion
- In Memory of Walter Savage Landor
- A Song in Time of Order. 1852
- A Song in Time of Revolution. 1860
- To Victor Hugo
- Before Dawn
- Dolores
- The Garden of Proserpine
- Hesperia
- Love at Sea
- April
- Before Parting
- The Sundew
- Félise
- An Interlude
- Hendecasyllabics
- Sapphics
- At Eleusis
- August
- A Christmas Carol
- The Masque of Queen Bersabe
- St. Dorothy
- The Two Dreams
- Aholibah
- Love and Sleep
- Madonna Mia
- The King's Daughter
- After Death
- May Janet
- The Bloody Son
- The Sea-Swallows
- The Year of Love
- Dedication

== Influences ==
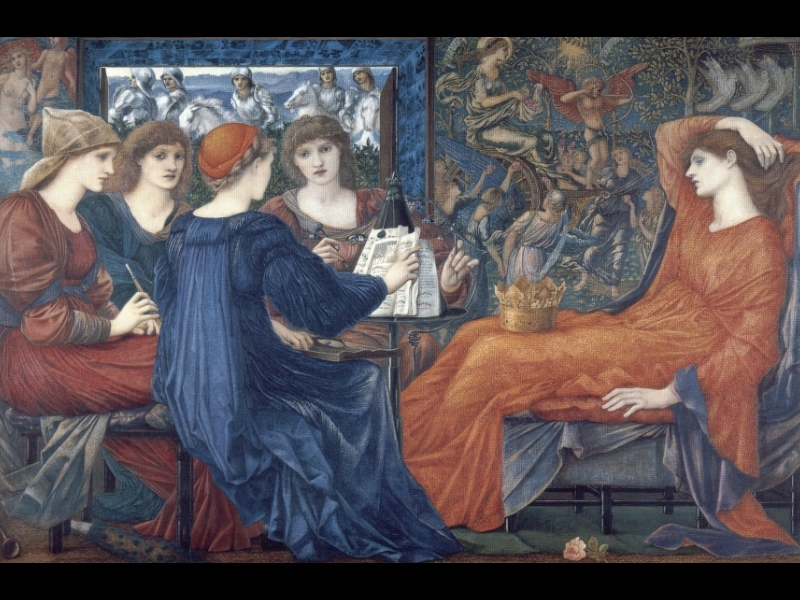
Laus Veneris, c.1875, by Edward Burne-Jones

- Swinburne dedicated Poems and Ballads to fellow Pre-Raphaelite, Edward Burne-Jones. Burne-Jones' painting Laus Veneris, first exhibited in 1878, shared the story of Tannhäuser as its inspiration with Swinburne's poem of the same name.

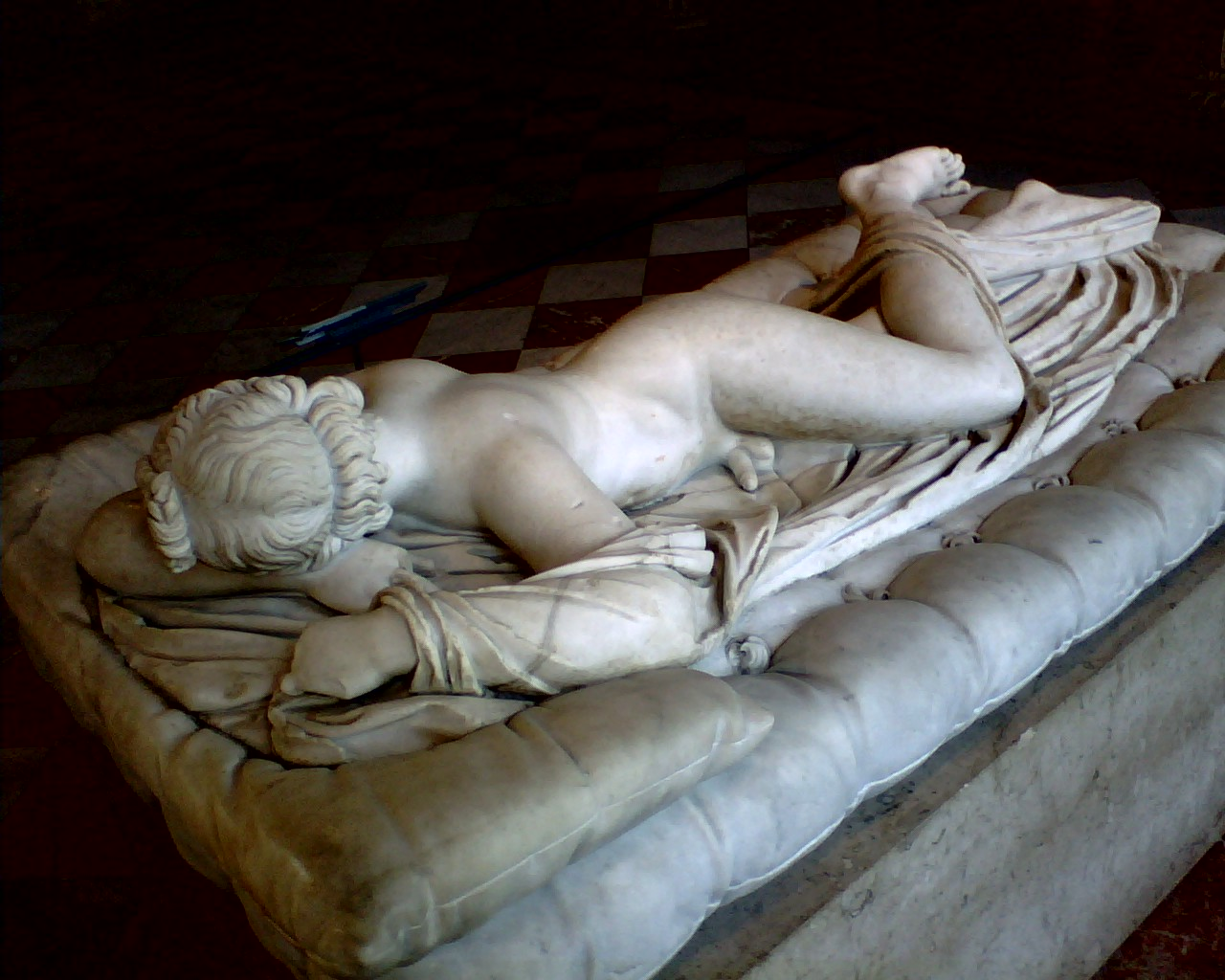
Sleeping Hermaphroditus, Louvre, Paris

- The Borghese Hermaphroditus at the Louvre inspired Swinburne's poem "Hermaphroditus", subscribed "Au Musée du Louvre, Mars 1863".
- The Isle of Wight, to the south of the British coast, was Swinburne's home throughout his childhood and later life; his love for the sea appears often in his poetry, where it is a metaphor for time, as in "Love at Sea", written in imitation of Théophile Gautier, and "The Triumph of Time".
- The first documented use of the word "lesbianism" to refer to female homosexuality is in 1870, four years after Swinburne published this book, which includes the poem "Sapphics", where he refers to Sappho of Lesbos and her lover Anactoria as "Lesbians". Although use of the term lesbian in this way was present as early as 1732, "sapphic" or "tribade" were more commonly used until the late 19th century, when Swinburne was among the first to popularize the term lesbian.

== Second and Third Series ==
In 1878, Swinburne published a collection of poems titled Poems and Ballads, Second Series, which is less political, and also shows the influence of French literature. It includes verses to Baudelaire, Gautier, Villon, Hugo, and Théodore de Banville. It also contains his translations of Villon.

In 1889, Swinburne published a collection of poems titled Poems and Ballads, Third Series, which contains "To a Seamew", "Pan and Thalassius", "Neap-Tide", elegies for Sir Henry Taylor and John William Inchbold, and border ballads, that were written for an unfinished novel, Lesbia Brandon.
