= Polycles (155 BC) =

Polycles was an ancient Greek sculptor who flourished about the 156th Olympiad (155 BC) and was mentioned in Pliny's Natural History. In Pliny's list, the name of this Polycles is followed by "Athenaeus", either to be taken as the name of another sculptor or as Polycles's birthplace. A Juno by him stood in the Portico of Octavia at Rome. The sculpture principally associated with this sculptor is a Hermaphroditus, of which there are no clues in Pliny as to whether it was standing or reclining, but which the surviving Roman copies are taken to be replicas of Polycles' bronze original. The Borghese Hermaphroditus is said to be one of these copies.
