= Sappho 31 =

Fragment of a Greek lyric poem by Sappho

Sappho 31 is a lyric poem by the Archaic Greek poet Sappho of the island of Lesbos. (Note: There are various numbering systems for Sappho's fragments; this article uses Voigt's numeration (which in most cases, including that of Sappho 31, matches Lobel and Page's numeration) throughout unless otherwise specified. Sappho 31 in Voigt is fragment 2 in both Bergk's and Diehl's editions.) The poem is also known as phainetai moi (φαίνεταί μοι lit. 'It seems to me') after the opening words of its first line, and as the Ode to Anactoria, based on a conjecture that its subject is Anactoria, a woman mentioned elsewhere by Sappho. It is one of Sappho's most famous poems, describing her love for a young woman.

Fragment 31 has been the subject of numerous translations and adaptations from ancient times to the present day. Celebrated for its portrayal of intense emotion, the poem has influenced modern conceptions of lyric poetry, and its depiction of desire continues to influence writers today.

The poem has been called the most famous example of lovesickness.

== Preservation ==
Fragment 31 was one of the few substantial fragments of Sappho to survive from ancient times, preserved in the first-century AD treatise on aesthetics On the Sublime. Four stanzas are well-preserved, followed by part of one more line; this, as well as Catullus' adaptation of the poem, suggests that there was originally one more stanza of the poem, often thought to have been Sappho resigning herself to the situation in which she finds herself. A reconstruction of the poem by classicist Armand D'Angour suggests that the original poem may have had up to 8 stanzas.

The opening words of the poem ("To me it seems that man...") are almost identical to a fragment of Sappho quoted by Apollonius Dyscolus: "To himself he seems". This might have been an alternative opening to Sappho 31.

== Poem ==
Fragment 31 is composed in Sapphic stanzas, a metrical form named after Sappho and consisting of stanzas of three long followed by one short line. (Note: The first three lines are eleven-syllable Sapphic hendecasyllables (of the form – u – x – u u – u – x ), while the fourth is five-syllable adonean (– u u – x).) Four strophes of the poem survive, along with a few words of a fifth. The poem is written in the Aeolic dialect, which was the dialect spoken in Sappho's time on her home island of Lesbos.

φαίνεταί μοι κῆνος ἴσος θέοισιν
ἔμμεν᾽ ὤνηρ, ὄττις ἐνάντιός τοι
ἰσδάνει καὶ πλάσιον ἆδυ φωνεί-
σας ὐπακούει

καὶ γελαίσας ἰμέροεν, τό μ᾽ ἦ μὰν
καρδίαν ἐν στήθεσιν ἐπτόαισεν·
ὠς γὰρ ἔς σ᾽ ἴδω βρόχε᾽, ὤς με φώναι-
σ᾽ οὐδ᾽ ἒν ἔτ᾽ εἴκει,

ἀλλ᾽ ἄκαν μὲν γλῶσσα ^{†}ἔαγε^{†}, λέπτον
δ᾽ αὔτικα χρῶι πῦρ ὐπαδεδρόμηκεν,
ὀππάτεσσι δ᾽ οὐδ᾽ ἒν ὄρημμ᾽, ἐπιρρόμ-
βεισι δ᾽ ἄκουαι,

^{†}έκαδε μ᾽ ἴδρως ψῦχρος κακχέεται^{†}, τρόμος δὲ
παῖσαν ἄγρει, χλωροτέρα δὲ ποίας
ἔμμι, τεθνάκην δ᾽ ὀλίγω ᾽πιδεύης
φαίνομ᾽ ἔμ᾽ αὔται·

ἀλλὰ πὰν τόλματον ἐπεὶ ^{†}καὶ πένητα^{†}

Translation:

"That man seems to me to be equal to the gods
who is sitting opposite you
and hears you nearby
speaking sweetly

and laughing delightfully, which indeed
makes my heart flutter in my breast;
for when I look at you even for a short time,
it is no longer possible for me to speak

but it is as if my tongue is broken
and immediately a subtle fire has run over my skin,
I cannot see anything with my eyes,
and my ears are buzzing

a cold sweat comes over me, trembling
seizes me all over, I am paler
than grass, and I seem nearly
to have died.

but everything must be dared/endured, since (?even a poor man) ..."

A 1919 translation by Edward Storer contains some differences:

He seems like a god to me the man who is near you,
Listening to your sweet voice and exquisite laughter
That makes my heart so wildly beat in my breast.

If I but see you for a moment, then all my words
Leave me, my tongue is broken and a sudden fire
Creeps through my blood. No longer can I see.

My ears are full of noise. In all my body I
Shudder and sweat. I am pale as the sun-scorched
Grass. In my fury I seem like a dead woman,

But I would dare...

== Contents ==
The poem centres around three characters: a man and a woman, both otherwise unidentified, and the speaker.

The context of the poem has been the subject of much scholarly debate: Thomas McEvilley calls it the "central controversy" about the poem. Wilamowitz suggested that the poem was a wedding song, and that the man mentioned in the initial stanza of the poem was the bridegroom. A poem in the Greek Anthology which echoes the first stanza of the poem is explicitly about a wedding; this perhaps strengthens the argument that fragment 31 was written as a wedding song. In modern times, it has been conventionally known as the "Ode to Anactoria", assuming the identity of the subject to be that of another woman mentioned by Sappho as an object of her desire, though no name appears in it. Since the second half of the twentieth century, scholars have tended to follow Denys Page in dismissing the wedding-song argument. William Race, for instance, says that the poem contains nothing to indicate that it is about a wedding, while Christina Clark argues that, though the interaction between the two characters observed by the speaker indicates that they are of similar social status, their interaction is likely to be compatible with a number of possible relationships, not just that between a bride and groom. For instance, she suggests that they might just as well be brother and sister.

One interpretation suggests that the man's precise relationship with the woman is not important. Instead, the man's role is to act as a "contrast figure", designed to highlight Sappho's love for the girl by juxtaposing the strength of Sappho's emotional reaction with his impassivity. For instance, John Winkler argues that "'That man' in poem 31 is like the military armament in poem 16, an introductory set-up to be dismissed".

As far back as the eighteenth century, it has been proposed that the poem is about Sappho's jealousy of the man who sits with her beloved. Though this is still a popular interpretation of the poem, many critics deny that the fragment is about jealousy at all. Anne Carson argues that Sappho has no wish to take the man's place, nor is she concerned that he will usurp hers: thus, she is not jealous of him, but amazed at his ability to retain his composure so close to the object of her desire. Another common interpretation of the poem is that it is primarily concerned with expressing the speaker's love for the girl. Joan DeJean criticises the "jealousy" interpretation of the poem as intended to play down the homoeroticism of the poem.

Armand D'Angour argues that the phrase ἀλλὰ πὰν τόλματον means "all must be dared", rather than "endured" as it is sometimes translated. The first translations of the poem into modern languages derived from Catullus' re-visitation of the poem, Catullus 51, painting Sappho with a green taint of jealousy. D'Angour's reading, on the other hand, offers as a secondary option the change of tone in the poem towards a more hopeful, rather than resigned, position.

A philological debate has also arisen concerning the very first words of the poem, phainetai moi, (φαίνεταί μοι); the most popular interpretation would read the first stanza of the poem as a true banner of lyricism, the use of the first word to introduce the subject of Sappho's alleged jealousy. An alternative reading is suggested by Gallavotti: according to his thesis, the text was corrupted over time as a result of the disappearance of the sound [w] (represented by the letter digamma Ϝ) and Sappho's original would have instead said phainetai woi (φαίνεταί ϝοι). This reading of the original text, which may be supported by a quote by Apollonius Dyscolus, would dramatically change the perspective of the first verse, its translation roughly being: "God-like he esteems himself to be". The speaker is then counter-posing her own experience in contrast with the man's and the next three stanzas describe the symptoms the narrator experiences "whenever I glance at you for a second". (Note: Sappho 31.6–7) The final surviving line, 17, has been thought to be the beginning of a stanza describing Sappho reconciling herself to the situation in which she found herself.

In 1970, an article by Hungarian-French psychoanalyst George Devereux suggested that what Sappho is describing here is a seizure, pointing that the symptoms listed in the fragment are the same symptoms of an anxiety attack. He also, on these very basis, supported Cobet's conjecture πέπαγε instead of †καμ† ... †ἔαγε† in line 9.

== Reception and influence ==
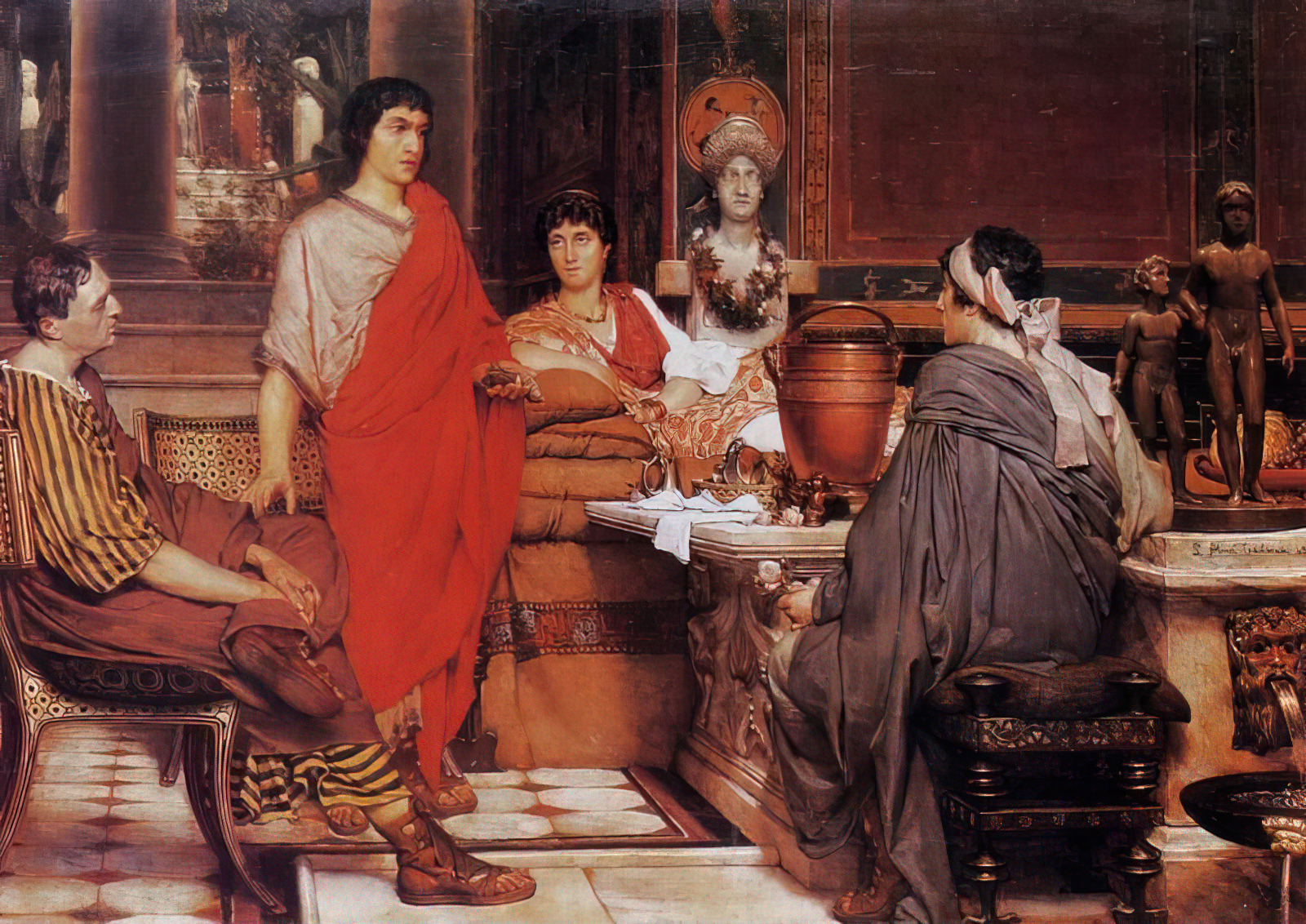
Lawrence Alma-Tadema, Catullus at Lesbia's 1865

Fragment 31 is one of Sappho's most famous works – according to Emmet Robbins, "probably the single most famous poem to come down from Antiquity". It is one of her most frequently adapted and translated poems, and has been the subject of more scholarly commentary than any other of her works. The ancient Greek authors Theocritus and Apollonius of Rhodes both adapted the poem, Theocritus in his second Idyll and Apollonius in his description of the first meeting between Jason and Medea in the Argonautica. In ancient Rome, the poet Catullus adapted it into his 51st poem, putting his muse Lesbia into the role of Sappho's beloved. The Roman poets Valerius Aedituus and Lucretius, and the playwright Plautus, all also adapt Sappho 31 in their works.

In the nineteenth century, the poem began to be seen as an exemplar of Romantic lyric, influencing poets such as Tennyson, whose "Eleänore" and "Fatima" were both inspired by fragment 31. Other Romantic poets influenced by the fragment include Shelley and Keats – for instance in "To Constantia, singing" and "Ode to a Nightingale", respectively.

Sappho's description of the physical response to desire in this poem is especially celebrated. The poem is quoted in Longinus's treatise On the Sublime for the intensity of its emotion, Plato draws on it in Socrates' second speech on love in the Phaedrus, and the physical symptoms of desire portrayed in the poem continue to be used to convey the feeling in modern culture.

== Works cited ==
- The Poems of Anyte of Tegea with Poems and Fragments of Sappho. Translated by Aldington, Richard; Storer, Edward. London: The Egoist. 1919. OCLC 556498375.
- Allendorf, Tobias (2022). "Greek Lyric at Rome: Before and After Augustan Poetry". In Swift, Laura (ed.). A Companion to Greek Lyric. Hoboken: Wiley-Blackwell. ISBN 978-1-119-12265-4.
- Bonelli, Guido (1977). "Saffo 2 Diehl = 31 Lobel-Page". L'Antiquité classique (in Italian). 46 (2): 453–494. doi:10.3406/antiq.1977.1865. ISSN 0770-2817.
- Carson, Anne (1986). Eros the Bittersweet: An Essay. Princeton, New Jersey: Princeton University Press.
- Clay, Diskin (2011). "Sappho, Selanna, and the Poetry of the Night". Giornale Italiano di Filologia. 2 (1–2).
- Clark, Christina (2001). "The Body of Desire: Nonverbal Communication in Sappho 31 V: dis manibus Barbara Hughes Fowler". Syllecta Classica. 12: 1–32. doi:10.1353/syl.2001.0005. S2CID 144624502.
- D'Angour, Armand (2013). "Love's Battlefield: Rethinking Sappho fr. 31". In Sanders, Ed; Thumiger, Chiara; Carey, Christopher; Lowe, Nick (eds.). Erôs in Ancient Greece. Oxford: Oxford University Press.
- DeJean, Joan (1989). Fictions of Sappho: 1546–1937. Chicago: University of Chicago Press.
- duBois, Page (1995). Sappho is Burning. Chicago: University of Chicago Press.
- Fowler, Robert L. (1987). "Sappho fr. 31. 9". Greek, Roman and Byzantine Studies. 28 (4): 433–439 – via library.duke.edu.
- Gianotti, Gian Franco (1997). Il Canto dei Greci [The Song of the Greeks] (in Italian). Turin: Loescher Editore. pp. 181–187. ISBN 88-201-1409-7.
- Hutchinson, G. O. (2001). Greek Lyric Poetry: A Commentary on Selected Larger Pieces. Oxford: Oxford University Press. ISBN 0-19-924017-5.
- Lardinois, André (1996). "Who Sang Sappho's Songs?". In Greene, Ellen (ed.). Reading Sappho: Contemporary Approaches. Berkeley: University of California Press.
- Lardinois, André (2011). "The New Sappho Poem (P. Köln 21351 and 21376): Key to the Old Fragments". Classics@. 4. Archived from the original on 2019-03-24.
- McEvilley, Thomas (1978). "Sappho, Fragment Thirty One: The Face Behind the Mask". Phoenix. 32 (1): 1–18. doi:10.2307/1087945. JSTOR 1087945.
- Peterson, Linda H. (1994). "Sappho and the Making of Tennysonian Lyric". ELH. 61 (1): 121–137. doi:10.1353/elh.1994.0010. S2CID 162385092.
- Prins, Yopie (2020). Victorian Sappho. Princeton University Press. ISBN 978-0-691-05919-8.
- Race, William H. (1983). ""That Man" in Sappho fr. 31 L-P". Classical Antiquity. 2 (1): 92–101. doi:10.2307/25010785. JSTOR 25010785.
- Rayor, Diane; Lardinois, André (2014). Sappho: A New Translation of the Complete Works. Cambridge: Cambridge University Press.
- Reynolds, Margaret (2001). The Sappho Companion. London: Vintage.
- Robbins, Emmet (2006). "Sappho". Brill's New Pauly. doi:10.1163/1574-9347_bnp_e1101040.
- Segal, Charles (1996). "Eros and Incantation: Sappho and Oral Poetry". In Greene, Ellen (ed.). Reading Sappho: Contemporary Approaches. Berkeley: University of California Press.
- Sinos, Dale S. (1982). "Sappho, fr. 31 LP: Structure and Context". Aevum. 56 (1).
- Tsargarakis, Odysseus (1979). "Some Neglected Aspects of Love in Sappho's Fr. 31 LP". Rheinisches Museum für Philologie. 122 (2).
- Wharton, Henry Thornton (1908) [1885]. Sappho: Memoir, Text, Selected Renderings, and a Literal Translation (Fifth ed.). London: John Lane. OCLC 4398974 – via Project Gutenberg.
- Williamson, Margaret (2009). "Sappho and Pindar in the 19th and 20th centuries". In Budelmann, Felix (ed.). The Cambridge Companion to Greek Lyric. Cambridge: Cambridge University Press.
- Winkler, John J. (1990). The Constraints of Desire: The Anthropology of Sex and Gender in Ancient Greece. New York: Routledge.
