= Arthur Clement Hilton =

English poet (1851–1877)

Arthur Clement Hilton (1851 – 3 April 1877) was an English clergyman and poet, known for his poem "Octopus", a parody of Swinburne's "Dolores".

== Bibliography ==
- Robert P. Edgcumbe, ed. The Works of Arthur Clement Hilton (Of Marlborough & Cambridge) Author of "The Light Green" Together with his Life and Letters (Cambridge: Macmillan and Bowes, 1902)
- Notes and Queries, Ser. 12, Vol. 10 (8 April 1922), p. 279
