= Dystheism =

Belief that a deity is not wholly good and is possibly evil

Dystheism (from Ancient Greek: δυσ-, romanized: dus-, lit. 'bad'; θεός, theos, 'god') is the belief that a deity is not wholly good and can even be considered evil. Definitions of the term somewhat vary, with Dirk J. Human defining it as "where God decides to become malevolent".

The broad theme of dystheism has existed for millennia, as shown by tricksters found in ethnic religions and by various interpretations of the Supreme God. For example, the God of the Hebrew Bible is an evil god according to gnostic traditions.

== Overview ==
The concept has been used frequently in popular culture and is a part of several religious traditions in the world. Tricksters found in ethnic religions often have a dystheistic nature. One example is Eshu, a trickster in Yoruba religion who deliberately fostered violence between groups of people for his amusement. Another example is Loki in old Norse religion, though Odin has these qualities as well.

Zoroastrianism involves belief in an ongoing struggle between a creator god of goodness, Ahura Mazda, and a destroying god of hatred, Angra Mainyu, neither of which is omnipotent, which is a form of dualistic cosmology. The ancient Greek god Ares, depending on time and region, was associated with all the horrors of war.

Dystheists may themselves be theists or atheists, and in the case of either, concerning the nature of the Abrahamic god, will assert that God is not good, and is possibly, although not necessarily, malevolent, particularly but not exclusively to those who do not wish to follow any of the Abrahamic religions. For example, in his Sinners in the Hands of an Angry God (1741), the revivalist Christian preacher Jonathan Edwards describes a God full of vengeful rage and contempt. However, Edwards' theology presumes a God whose vengeance and contempt are directed toward evil and its manifestation in fallen humanity. To Edwards, a deity that ignores moral corruption or shows indifference to evil would be closer to the deity espoused by dystheism, that is, evil, because justice is an extension of love and moral goodness.

One particular view of dystheism, an atheistic approach, is summarized by the prominent revolutionary philosopher Mikhail Bakunin, who wrote in God and the State that "if God really existed, it would be necessary to abolish him". Bakunin argued that, as a "jealous lover of human liberty, and deeming it the absolute condition of all that we admire and respect in humanity", the "idea of God" constitutes metaphysical oppression of the idea of human choice. This argument is an inversion of Voltaire's phrase "If God did not exist, it would be necessary for man to invent Him".

Political theorist and activist Thomas Paine similarly wrote in The Age of Reason, "Whenever we read the obscene stories, the voluptuous debaucheries, the cruel and torturous executions, the unrelenting vindictiveness, with which more than half the Bible is filled, it would be more consistent that we called it the word of a demon, than the word of God." He added, "It is a history of wickedness, that has served to corrupt and brutalize mankind; and, for my part, I sincerely detest it, as I detest everything that is cruel." Unlike Bakunin, however, Paine's condemnation of the purported nature of the divine from his time did not extend to outright atheism and disbelief in all spirituality: Paine stated that he accepted the deistic notion of an almighty mover behind all things.

Victorian era figure Algernon Charles Swinburne wrote in his work Anactoria about the ancient Greek poet Sappho and her lover Anactoria in explicitly dystheistic imagery that includes cannibalism and sadomasochism.

== See also ==
- Argument from morality
- Demiurge
- Ethical monotheism
- Evil God challenge
- God and the State
- Holocaust theology
- Misotheism
- Moralistic therapeutic deism
- Problem of evil
- Problem of Hell
