= Hymn to Proserpine =

1866 poem by Algernon Charles Swinburne

"Hymn to Proserpine" is a poem by Algernon Charles Swinburne, published in Poems and Ballads in 1866. The poem is addressed to the goddess Proserpina, the Roman equivalent of Persephone, but laments the rise of Christianity for displacing the pagan goddess and her pantheon.

The epigraph at the beginning of the poem is the phrase Vicisti, Galilaee, Latin for "You have conquered, O Galilean", the supposed dying words of the Emperor Julian. He had tried to reverse the official endorsement of Christianity by the Roman Empire. The poem is cast in the form of a lament by a person professing the paganism of classical antiquity and lamenting its passing, and expresses regret at the rise of Christianity.

The line "Time and the Gods are at strife" inspired the title of Lord Dunsany's Time and the Gods.

The poem is quoted by Sue Bridehead in Thomas Hardy's 1895 novel Jude the Obscure, and also by Edward Ashburnham in Ford Madox Ford's The Good Soldier. Elizabeth Costello's dispute with her religious sister Blanche in J.M. Coetzee's novel Elizabeth Costello, referencing both the poem's Emperor Julian quote and a celebration of the power of the female breast, suggests that Costello's opinion is a homage to Swinburne's appeal to pagan beauty against Christian piety.

== See also ==
- "The Garden of Proserpine", another poem by A. C. Swinburne
- Poems and Ballads
