= The Leper (poem) =

1866 poem by Algernon Charles Swinburne

- by Algernon Charles Swinburne
- Rhyme scheme: ABAC
- Publication date: 1866
- Lines: 140

The Leper is a poem by Algernon Charles Swinburne that comes from a collection of poems entitled Poems and Ballads, published in 1866.

== Summary ==
The poem is written in a traditional ABAC rhyme scheme in quatrains. The first twelve lines of the poem establish a first-person point of view from the perspective of a scribe in love with the aristocratic woman he serves while knowing she dislikes him.

Nothing is better, I well think,
Than love; the hidden well-water
Is not so delicate to drink:
This was well seen of me and her.
I served her in a royal house;
I served her wine and curious meat.
For will to kiss between her brows,
I had no heart to sleep or eat.
Mere scorn God knows she had of me,
A poor scribe, nowise great or fair,
Who plucked his clerk's hood back to see
Her curled-up lips and amorous hair.

Lines thirteen through twenty switch from past tense to present tense. They describe how when the scribe was her servant in the past, he pined after her without being able to get close to her. Then comes the reveal that in the present, the woman is dead, and he is able to kiss her whenever he likes.

I vex my head with thinking this.
Yea, though God always hated me,
And hates me now that I can kiss
Her eyes, plait up her hair to see
How she then wore it on the brows,
Yet am I glad to have her dead
Here in this wretched wattled house
Where I can kiss her eyes and head.

Lines twenty-one through thirty-two describe how when the woman was alive and the narrator was still her scribe, he would help her meet with her lover by bringing him through a privy, or private, passage to her lattice.

Nothing is better, I well know,
Than love; no amber in cold sea
Or gathered berries under snow:
That is well seen of her and me.
Three thoughts I make my pleasure of:
First I take heart and think of this:
That knight's gold hair she chose to love,
His mouth she had such will to kiss.
Then I remember that sundawn
I brought him by a privy way
Out at her lattice, and thereon
What gracious words she found to say.

Lines thirty-three through forty-eight describe how the woman fell sick with leprosy and her body changed for the worse. According to the narrator, she thanked him when this happened because he stayed with her. It's possible that he married her so that the woman would not be shamed for having extramarital sex with the aforementioned lover.

(Cold rushes for such little feet —
Both feet could lie into my hand.
A marvel was it of my sweet
Her upright body could so stand.)
"Sweet friend, God give you thank and grace;
Now am I clean and whole of shame,
Nor shall men burn me in the face
For my sweet fault that scandals them."
I tell you over word by word.
She, sitting edgewise on her bed,
Holding her feet, said thus. The third,
A sweeter thing than these, I said.
God, that makes time and ruins it
And alters not, abiding God,
Changed with disease her body sweet,
The body of love wherein she abode.

Lines forty-nine through sixty-eight describe how the woman was shunned by the lover she had before her sickness, and presumably by her family and the public eye. The "they" described in the poem exile her because they believe the leprosy was a curse from God for sinful behavior, specifically extramarital sex. It's the narrator who insists that she's not "a plague to spurn away" but "sweeter than all sweet."

Love is more sweet and comelier
Than a dove's throat strained out to sing.
All they spat out and cursed at her
And cast her forth for a base thing.
They cursed her, seeing how God had wrought
This curse to plague her, a curse of his.
Fools were they surely, seeing not
How sweeter than all sweet she is.
He that had held her by the hair,
With kissing lips blinding her eyes,
Felt her bright bosom, strained and bare,
Sigh under him, with short mad cries
Out of her throat and sobbing mouth
And body broken up with love,
With sweet hot tears his lips were loth
Her own should taste the savour of,
Yea, he inside whose grasp all night
Her fervent body leapt or lay,
Stained with sharp kisses red and white,
Found her a plague to spurn away.

Lines sixty-nine through eighty are about the narrator bringing the woman to a wattled house, one made of sticks mixed with clay meant for peasants, and nursing her. He describes it as "the service God forbids," once again referencing how the woman's leprosy was believed to be a divine curse. The woman has fallen from the noble class to being exceedingly poor. The narrator takes such pleasure in caring for her that he neglects his own needs to eat and sleep.

I hid her in this wattled house,
I served her water and poor bread.
For joy to kiss between her brows
Time upon time I was nigh dead.
Bread failed; we got but well-water
And gathered grass with dropping seed.
I had such joy of kissing her,
I had small care to sleep or feed.
Sometimes when service made me glad
The sharp tears leapt between my lids,
Falling on her, such joy I had
To do the service God forbids.

Lines eighty-one through ninety-two show the woman asking that the narrator stop attempting to save her life and let her go.

"I pray you let me be at peace,
Get hence, make room for me to die."
She said that: her poor lip would cease,
Put up to mine, and turn to cry.
I said, "Bethink yourself how love
Fared in us twain, what either did;
Shall I unclothe my soul thereof?
That I should do this, God forbid."
Yea, though God hateth us, he knows
That hardly in a little thing
Love faileth of the work it does
Till it grow ripe for gathering.

Lines ninety-three through the end of the poem reveal that the woman lived for six more months before dying. The narrator kept her body on the bed she died on even as it deteriorated and continued to kiss her and hold her feet like he used to, though it both "thrilled and burned him." This last part of the poem suggests that he regrets forcing his affection on her as the only person who remained in her life to take care of her and that if he had simply taken care of her platonically she may have grown to love him anyway.

Six months, and now my sweet is dead
A trouble takes me; I know not
If all were done well, all well said,
No word or tender deed forgot.
Too sweet, for the least part in her,
To have shed life out by fragments; yet,
Could the close mouth catch breath and stir,
I might see something I forget.
Six months, and I sit still and hold
In two cold palms her cold two feet.
Her hair, half grey half ruined gold,
Thrills me and burns me in kissing it.
Love bites and stings me through, to see
Her keen face made of sunken bones.
Her worn-off eyelids madden me,
That were shot through with purple once.
She said, "Be good with me; I grow
So tired for shame's sake, I shall die
If you say nothing:" even so.
And she is dead now, and shame put by.
Yea, and the scorn she had of me
In the old time, doubtless vexed her then.
I never should have kissed her. See
What fools God's anger makes of men!
She might have loved me a little too,
Had I been humbler for her sake.
But that new shame could make love new
She saw not — yet her shame did make.
I took too much upon my love,
Having for such mean service done
Her beauty and all the ways thereof,
Her face and all the sweet thereon.
Yea, all this while I tended her,
I know the old love held fast his part:
I know the old scorn waxed heavier,
Mixed with sad wonder, in her heart.
It may be all my love went wrong —
A scribe's work writ awry and blurred,
Scrawled after the blind evensong —
Spoilt music with no perfect word.
But surely I would fain have done
All things the best I could. Perchance
Because I failed, came short of one,
She kept at heart that other man's.
I am grown blind with all these things:
It may be now she hath in sight
Some better knowledge; still there clings
The old question. Will not God do right?

== Background ==
Leprosy or Hansen's disease is a medical condition that has been negatively associated and stigmatized majorly in the middle ages and late Victorian 19th century. Swinburne published The Leper and his other poetry at a turning point in England, English poetry shifted its focus from societal problems and morality to a more sensationalistic subject matter. Swinburne's Poems and Ballads are recalled, by historians, as one of the starting points for the philosophy of "art for art's sake." Swinburne's Poems and Ballads, were filled with the theme of decadence and intentionally meant to "épater le bourgeois". At the time of its publication, The Leper was one of Swinburne's most controversial works from Poems and Ballads. British news outlets and literary journals such as; The Spectator, and Fraser's Magazine reviewed it negatively and the latter called for its suppression. The poem makes multiple references to God, and the notion that God uses leprosy as a form of punishment. God punishing humans with leprosy is a superstition held by both ancient and medieval societies. However, another characteristic that places this poem in the medieval era is the abandonment and isolation of the leper, even her family and friends cast her out.

== Author ==
Algernon Charles Swinburne was born in London in 1837, during the Victorian Era. His works were known for rebelling against the conservative values of this period by using overtly sexual and scandalous themes.

== Themes ==
=== Religion ===
The poem contains an element of "sexual dissidence" that the poet, Algernon Charles Swinburne, uses "to condemn Christian ideals...by creating an association between disgust and the act of taking care of someone with leprosy." The act of taking care of another person seems to be a relatively Christian manner, which would appear to contradict the speaker's "unsavory lust" for the leper woman. In addition to this, Swinburne makes an acknowledgement that the leper had been touched by God, appearing to make her sweeter than she is. However, the audience must also consider that the touch was done with the intention of giving her leprosy, making the act very transgressive. Another way religion is brought up in the poem is when the speaker acknowledges his sin in the line "I should have never kissed her." This leaves an impression on the reader to decide whether or not this recognition means that his sin is lessened or if the act becomes more defiant because he knows what he is doing is wrong but continues to carry out the act anyway. It's clear that the narrator follows a pattern of defiance to God and criticizes Christianity on the as the line in "The Leper" mentions "Will God not do right?" The poet utilizes the speaker's actions as a way to question divine justice in Christianity.

=== Taboo ===
The behavior exhibited by the man would be regarded as taboo for the time, and possibly even today given the state of the woman. The woman is in an advanced stage of leprosy, and despite the risk of infection to the man, he remains by her side to care for her and tend to her needs, while also exhibiting possessive and negrophilic behavior towards her. The act of caring for a leprous woman was extremely taboo for the time, as those with leprosy were considered condemned by God as punishment for their sins, and to try and alleviate their suffering was deemed an affront to God, to interfere with their supposedly deserved divine punishment.

=== Class ===
The woman begins the poem in a royal house with the narrator as her servant, according to the second stanza. She’s cast from her high station to live in an earthen home with only simple food when she gets sick and after that is served only by the same servant, the man obsessed with her. It could be that Swinburne was making a statement about how nobody, not even the elite, is immune to the whims of luck and mortality.

=== Gender and Power Imbalance ===
The theme of gender in the poem is seen between the dynamic of the narrator and the leper woman when the narrator assumes control of the woman's entire being. This dynamic could be described as male dominance and female submission. Objectification of women is seen when the leper woman is reduced to a passive manner especially when she is held by the man. Rather than being embraced, the leper woman is processed. As this story is described through the male gaze, the leper woman cannot voice her objections.

There is a power imbalance between the speaker and the leper woman. Although the leper woman was once a noble, her previous social status does not mean anything when "the speaker as he services the woman, it becomes clear that he wants to serve her for all his life". The woman has nobody else to take care of her and "the speaker clearly wants to possess the woman in totality, as conveyed by the necrophiliac act he commits". The narrator is forcing his affection on her as she continues to decay, and she is powerless to stop it.

The power imbalance flips over the course of the poem. The woman has power over the male narrator in the beginning. Not only is he her servant, he is also in love with her. He submits to her will when he agrees to sneak her lover over to see her. When she loses her wealth and status with nobody else to turn to, he suddenly holds all the power.

=== Decadence ===
Decadence is defined as decay caused by excessive pleasure-seeking. When Swinburne was alive during the Victorian Era, there was a literary era called the Decadent Movement. This poem is decadent because the narrator neglects his own health in favour of taking care of his sick charge, and he also neglects to think about her desires in favour of fulfilling his - a romantic relationship with her. Decadence is often thought of as a wealthy person's vice but anyone, rich or poor, can fall into prioritizing overindulgence over healthy behaviour.
