= Evil God challenge =

Thought experiment in philosophy

The evil God challenge is a philosophical thought experiment. The challenge is to explain why an all-good God is more likely than an all-evil God. Those who advance this challenge assert that, unless there is a satisfactory answer to the challenge, there is no reason to accept that God is good or can provide moral guidance.

== Origin ==
Papers by Stephen Cahn, Peter Millican, Edward Stein, Christopher New, and Charles B Daniels, explored the notion of an "anti-God"—an omnipotent, omniscient and all evil God. The evil God challenge was developed at length and in several formats by the philosopher Stephen Law.

Supporting the greater likeliness of an omnimalevolent creator, in 2015, John Zande published an extended argument for the evil God thesis, arguing that the irresistible, self-complicating nature of this universe not only resolves the problem of good, but establishes unignorable theological evidence for the wicked disposition of the Creator. Stephen Law noted this work to be an intriguing development in the theology of the evil God.

== The challenge ==
The evil God challenge demands explanations for why belief in an all-powerful all-good God is significantly more reasonable than belief in an all-powerful all-evil God. Most of the popular arguments for the existence of God give no clue to his moral character and thus appear, in isolation, to work just as well in support of an evil God as a good God. This challenge supports why suffering exists in the world. If the world was in fact created by an all-good God, this would not occur.

== Criticisms and responses ==
Several criticisms and responses to the evil God challenge have been presented. William Lane Craig, Steve Wykstra, Dan Howard-Snyder, and Mike Rea have all suggested that the evident presence of good in the world makes impossible the notion of an all-evil, omnipotent God. William Lane Craig has suggested that an all-evil God would create a world devoid of any good, owing to his nature of evil, whereas an all-good God would create a world realistically with elements of both good and evil. Stephen Law contends that even if an evil God is logically untenable, if an evil God would nevertheless be ruled out in any case based on observed goods, a good God should be similarly ruled out on the basis of observed evils.

Max Andrews objects to Law's contention here not by denying the existence of evil, but by denying the existence of evil as Law defines it. In general, Law's challenge is only valid if evil is defined as "equal and opposite" to good: the evil God challenge is premised not upon the existence of evil, but upon a peculiar belief about what evil is, a belief Law borrows from the religious fundamentalist described in the quotation above. Andrews instead adopts Augustine's definition of evil not as equal and opposite to good, and thus as the presence of some thing, but rather as an absence of good, and thus as something with no nature of its own: according to this definition, an evil God and a good God are not comparable, making the line of argument involved in the challenge meaningless. The comparison between a good God and an evil God according to this definition would be like a comparison between apples and no apples. Andrews further suggests, given this definition of evil, the notion of an all-evil God is incoherent, since such a God would be unable to imagine everything he did was evil. In other words, the evil God challenge, far from being purely atheistic, is premised upon a particular theological or ontological belief about the nature of evil that is not accepted by many theists.

Rebutting Andrews's characterization of evil as presented in his "A Response to the Problem of an 'Evil God' as Raised by Stephen Law", John Zande argued that maximum evil (identified as The Owner of All Infernal Names: a metaphysically necessary, maximally powerful being who does not share his creation with any other comparable spirit) is not, as Andrews proposes, "maximally selfish", hateful, vengeful, or even hostile, rather best described as intensely pragmatic and thoroughly observant of his needs; promoting, defending, and even admiring life in its struggle to persist and self-adorn. As presented, maximum evil is not, therefore, an Ouroboros on a colossal scale, hopelessly given over to self-indulgence and destined to defile itself and anything it imagined into being, for a world driven only by impetuous brutality would resemble more a raging, super-heated, short-lived bonfire than a secure, creative, and ultimately profitable marketplace desired by a creator who, above all other things, seeks to maximize his own pleasure over time.

Peter Forrest has suggested an evil God is less likely than a good God, because the term good is intrinsically linked to the notion of God in a way that evil is not. Edward Feser has argued with Law from a similar position. According to these arguments, an evil God, whatever this might be, would simply not be God.

Perry Hendricks has used skeptical theism to argue against the evil God challenge. The evil God challenge relies on what Law calls "the symmetry thesis," which states that if belief in an evil God is unreasonable, then belief in a good God is unreasonable. Law claims that the existence of good in the world renders belief in an evil God unreasonable, and hence, by the symmetry thesis, belief in a good God is unreasonable. Hendricks challenges Law's assumption that the existence of good renders improbable an evil God: he argues that for the same reason that skeptical theism undermines arguments from evil against a good God, it also undermines arguments from good against an evil God. Hence, belief in an evil God is not unreasonable, at least on account of the existence of good, and the symmetry thesis is irrelevant. So, even if the symmetry thesis is granted, Hendricks claims that the evil God challenge is innocuous. Hendricks also suggests that the advocate of good God theism can make use of reformed epistemology, phenomenal conservatism, and historical arguments for Christianity to justify accepting the existence of a good God over an evil God.

== See also ==
- Epicurus' trilemma – Logical dilemma in philosophy
- Euthyphro dilemma – Ethical problem on the origin of morality posed by Socrates
- Misotheism – Hatred of God or the gods
- Problem of evil – Philosophical question
- Dystheism – Belief that a deity is not wholly good and is possibly evil
