= Adonic =

Unit of Aeolic verse

An adonic (Latin: adoneus) is a unit of Aeolic verse, a five-syllable metrical foot consisting of a dactyl followed by a trochee. The last line of a Sapphic stanza is an adonic. The pattern (where "-" stands for a long and "u" for a short syllable) is: "- u u - -" when the pattern ends with a spondee (i.e. --) or " -uu -u " if a trochee is intended.

Hexameter lines often end in an adonic.
