= Poetry of Sappho =

Body of literary work by Ancient Greek poet Sappho

Sappho was an ancient Greek lyric poet from the island of Lesbos. She is believed to have written around 10,000 lines of poetry, only a small fraction of which survives. Only one poem is known to be complete; in some cases as little as a single word survives.

In the ancient world, the standard edition of Sappho's poetry was compiled by scholars in Alexandria in the third or second century BC. This comprised eight or nine books of her poetry, probably grouping poems in the same metre. Manuscripts of Sappho's poetry continued to be produced into the seventh century AD, but by the ninth century her work appears to have been lost, known only indirectly through quotation in other sources. Modern editions of Sappho's poetry are the product of centuries of scholarship, first compiling quotations from surviving ancient works, and from the late 19th century rediscovering her works preserved on fragments of ancient papyri and parchment. Along with the poems which can be attributed with confidence to Sappho, a small number of surviving fragments in her Aeolic dialect may be by either her or her contemporary Alcaeus. Modern editions of Sappho also collect ancient "testimonia" which discuss Sappho's life and works.

== Textual history ==
=== Ancient editions ===
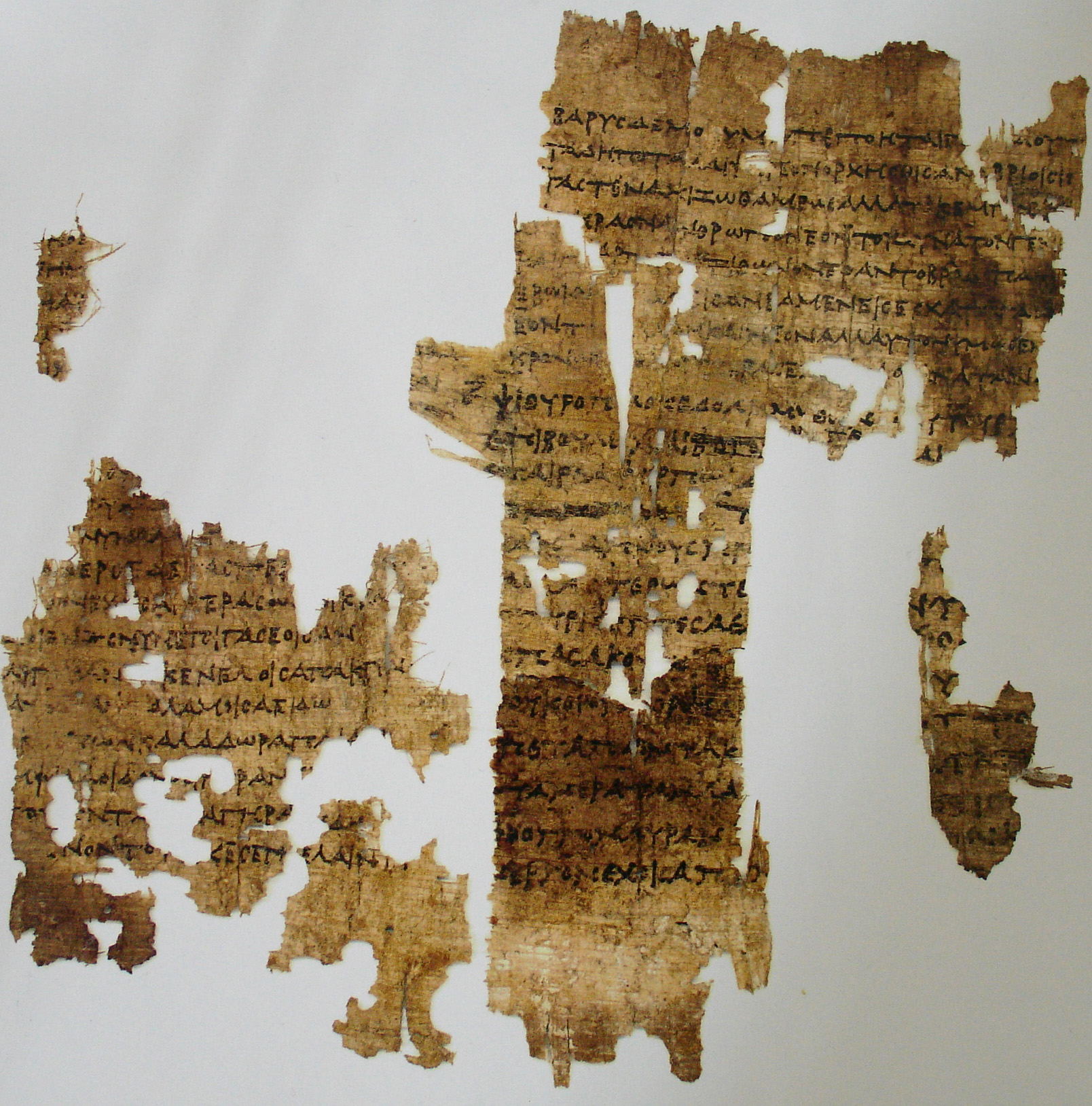
The Cologne papyrus, on which Sappho's Tithonus poem is partially preserved

Sappho probably wrote around 10,000 lines of poetry; today, only 650 survive. They were originally composed for performance, and it is unclear precisely when they were first written down. Some scholars argue that books of Sappho's poetry were produced in or shortly after her own lifetime; others believe that if they were written down in that time, it was only as an aid to reperformance rather than as a literary work in their own right.

In the third or second century BC, Sappho's poems were edited into a critical edition by scholars in Alexandria. This may have been based on an Athenian text of her poems, or one from her native island of Lesbos. It is uncertain which of the Alexandrian scholars was responsible for the edition of Sappho; both Aristophanes of Byzantium and Aristarchus of Samothrace are reported to have produced editions of Alcaeus, and one or both of these may have been responsible for the Alexandrian edition of Sappho. Alexander Dale argues that Aristophanes was more likely responsible.

The Alexandrian edition of Sappho's poetry was divided into eight or nine books: the exact number is uncertain. Ancient testimonia mention an eighth book of the Alexandrian edition of Sappho; an epigram by Tullius Laurea mentions nine books of Sappho, though it is not certain that he is referring to the Alexandrian edition. These books were probably divided up by metre, arranged based on the syllable count of the metre. Ancient sources record that each of the first three books contained poems in a single specific metre. (Note: For book 1, Sapphic stanzas; for book 2, glyconics with double dactylic expansion in distichs; for book 3, glyconics with double choriambic expansion in distichs.) Information about the contents of the later books is less certain: the fourth book appears to have contained many poems in acephalous hipponacteans with double choriambic expansion, and possibly in other metres; (Note: No ancient source describes the contents of book 4 of the Alexandrian edition of Sappho's works. Lobel & Page assigned the fragments of poems found on P. Oxy. 1787 to book 4 on the grounds that all are compatible with the same metre and that the first three books of Sappho were metrically homogeneous while the fifth was not; if there was another metrically homogeneous book, it was therefore likely the fourth.) the fifth book was metrically heterogeneous, with ancient sources mentioning the use of Phaelecian hendecasyllables and lesser asclepiads; of the sixth, nothing is known; a single couplet from the seventh book is preserved in Hephaestion (Note: Fr. 102; the meter of the two lines quoted by Hephaestion is an iambic dimeter, followed by a glyconic and a bacchius (u - u - u - - u u - u - u - -).) but it is unclear whether this was an entire stanza or part of a three- or four-line stanza. Fragment 103 preserves 10 incipits of poems by Sappho, possibly from book 8, of which the first is in a different metre from the remaining nine; those nine may or may not all be in the same meter. A ninth book may have been made up of epithalamia in various meters, though many scholars are skeptical of the evidence for this, and consider that the book of epithalamia mentioned in ancient sources might have been the eighth book of the Alexandrian edition.

In addition to the Alexandrian edition, at least some of Sappho's poetry was in circulation in the ancient world in other collections. The Cologne papyrus on which the Tithonus poem is preserved was part of a Hellenistic anthology of poetry, and predates the Alexandrian edition. Two fragments list opening lines of poems: Fr. 103 contains openings to ten of Sappho's poems, and Fr. 213C Campbell quotes openings to poems by Sappho, Alcaeus, and Anacreon; both might be related to anthological collections.

=== Loss and recovery ===
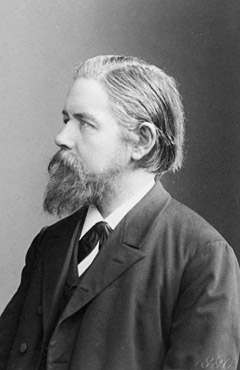
Friedrich Blass, whose publication of a parchment fragment of Sappho's poetry in 1880 marked the beginning of a new era in the rediscovery of her work

Today, most of Sappho's poetry is lost. The two major sources of surviving fragments of Sappho are quotations in other ancient works, from a whole poem to as little as a single word; and fragments of papyrus, many of which were discovered at Oxyrhynchus in Egypt. A few fragments survive on other materials, including parchment and potsherds. The oldest surviving fragment of Sappho currently known is the Cologne papyrus which contains the Tithonus poem; it dates to the third century BC.

Sappho's poetry survived into the seventh century, longer than that of the other canonical Greek lyric poets. Unlike other, less popular authors, the Alexandrian edition of Sappho's poetry was copied from papyrus rolls to the codex. Her work appears to have disappeared around the ninth century; there is no evidence that it was ever copied into the minuscule handwriting which began to be used at this time. Sappho's poetry continued to be accessible only in quotations from other ancient authors, which, until printed editions of Greek texts began to appear in the Renaissance, would only have been accessible in manuscript form in monastic libraries. In 1508, a collection of Greek rhetorical works edited by Demetrios Doukas and published by Aldus Manutius made a poem by Sappho (the Ode to Aphrodite) available in print for the first time; in 1554, Henri Estienne was the first to collect her poetry when he printed the Ode to Aphrodite and the Midnight poem after a collection of fragments of Anacreon. The first modern edition devoted solely to Sappho's work was published in 1733 by Johann Christian Wolf, including fourteen fragments not previously included in collections of her poetry. The work of collecting quotations from Sappho from ancient sources culminated in Theodor Bergk's edition of the Greek lyric poets, whose second edition contained 120 fragments of Sappho and 50 testimonia.

The last quarter of the nineteenth century began a new period in the rediscovery of Sappho's poetry, with the discovery of a parchment fragment at Crocodilopolis (modern Faiyum) published by Friedrich Blass in 1880. From then until the publication of the "newest Sappho" in 2014, 24 papyri preserving texts of Sappho, and eight preserving related materials such as commentaries on her work, have been published. The most recent major editions of Sappho, by Edgar Lobel and Denys Page in 1955, and Eva-Maria Voigt in 1971, in conjunction with Lobel and Page's Supplementa Lyra Graeca, collect all of the material published by 1974; despite the publication of further papyrus fragments in 1997, 2004, 2005 and 2014, Voigt's remains the standard modern edition.

== Poems ==
The fragments of Sappho's poems are arranged in the editions of Lobel and Page, and Voigt, by the book from the Alexandrian edition of her works in which they are believed to have been found. Fragments 1–42 are from Book 1, 43–52 from Book 2, 53–57 from Book 3, 58–91 from Book 4; 92–101 from Book 5, 102 from Book 7, 103 from Book 8, and 104–117B from the Epithalamia. Fragments 118–168 are those which Lobel and Page did not assign to any particular book, and are arranged alphabetically. Fragment numbers with capital letters (such as 16A) were assigned by later editors to fit into Lobel and Page's numeration; lowercase letters indicate different parts of the same fragment.

Fragment Number (Note: Fragment numbers are largely those of Voigt 1971, the standard critical edition of Sappho's poetry, whose numeration in most cases matches that of Lobel & Page 1955. Fragments discovered between 1955 and 1963 were included as addenda to Lobel & Page 1963, a reprint of the 1955 volume; those have different numberings in Voigt and in Lobel-Page. Fragments published after Voigt's edition was completed up to 1974 are included in Lobel & Page 1974 (SLG); the numbers are those as given in Campbell 1982 to fit in with Voigt's and Lobel & Page's numerations. A small number of fragments attributed to Sappho by Voigt are not included in Lobel-Page; they are instead found in Page 1962 (PMG). Two major discoveries from 2004 and 2014 postdate all of these editions; in this list they are referred to by the names given in Rayor & Lardinois 2014, and follow the Greek texts given in Obbink 2011, Obbink 2014 and Burris, Fish & Obbink 2014.)	Sources	Meter (Note: Except where otherwise noted, metres are those given in Voigt 1971. Where a metre is only partially reconstructed, it is expressed using "-" to indicate a long syllable, "u" to indicate a short syllable, and "x" to indicate a syllable which can be either long or short, with "]" and "[" respectively indicating that the metre before and after that point is lost. "||" and "|||" indicate the end of a line and a stanza, respectively.)	No. of lines
Fragment 1	P. Oxy. 2288; Dionysius of Halicarnassus	Sapphic stanza	28
Fragment 2	PSI 1300	Sapphic stanza	17 (Note: Voigt numbers the lines 1a, followed by 1–16; line 1a is not in the Lesbian dialect and may not have been part of the original poem.)
Fragment 3	P. Berol. 5006; P. Oxy. 424	Sapphic stanza	18
Fragment 4	P. Berol. 5006	Sapphic stanza	10
Fragment 5	P. Oxy. 7; P. Oxy. 2289; P. GC	Sapphic stanza	20
Fragment 6	P. Oxy. 2289	perhaps Sapphic stanza	15
Fragment 7	P. Oxy. 2289	Sapphic stanza	7
Fragment 8	P. Oxy. 2289	Sapphic stanza	5
Fragment 9	P. Oxy. 2289; P. GC	Sapphic stanza	20
Brothers Poem (Note: Follows fragment 9 in the Alexandrian edition. Called fr.9a by e.g. West 2014 and fr.10 by Neri 2021. Overlaps with fr.10 LP (omitted from Voigt).)	P. Oxy. 2289; P. Sapph. Obbink	Sapphic stanza	24
Fragment 12	P. Oxy. 2289	Sapphic stanza	9
Fragment 15 (Note: Voigt divides the fragment into 15a and 15b, but the two fragments join from line 9)	P. Oxy. 1231	Sapphic stanza	12
Fragment 16	P. Oxy. 1231; PSI 123; P. GC	Sapphic stanza	20 (Note: Voigt gives 32 lines; P. GC shows that the final 12 lines of Voigt are a separate poem (16A))
Fragment 16A (Note: Included in both Lobel & Page 1955 and Voigt 1971 as part of fragment 16. The discovery of P. GC shows that fragment 16A comes from a different poem to fragment 16.)	P. Oxy. 1231; PSI 123; P. GC	Sapphic stanza	12
Fragment 17	P. Oxy. 1231; P. Oxy. 2166(a); P. Oxy. 2289; P. GC	Sapphic stanza	20
Fragment 18	P. Oxy. 1231; P. GC	Sapphic stanza	15
Fragment 18A	P. GC	Sapphic stanza	9
Fragment 19	P. Oxy. 1231	Sapphic stanza	12
Fragment 20	P. Oxy. 1231	Sapphic stanza	24
Fragment 21	P. Oxy. 1231; Apollonius Dyscolus	Sapphic stanza	15
Fragment 22	P. Oxy. 1231	Sapphic stanza	19
Fragment 23	P. Oxy. 1231	Sapphic stanza	14
Fragment 24a	P. Oxy. 1231	Sapphic stanza	8
Fragment 24b	P. Oxy. 2166	Sapphic stanza	5
Fragment 24c	P. Oxy. 1231	Sapphic stanza	9
Fragment 24d	P. Oxy. 1231	Sapphic stanza	7
Fragment 25	P. Oxy. 1231	Sapphic stanza	7
Fragment 26	P. Oxy. 1231, P. Sapph. Obbink	Sapphic stanza	16
Fragment 27	P. Oxy. 1231	Sapphic stanza	13
Fragment 28a	P. Oxy. 1231	Sapphic stanza	4
Fragment 28b	P. Oxy. 1231	Sapphic stanza	5
Fragment 28c	P. Oxy. 1231	Sapphic stanza	5
Fragment 29a	P. Oxy. 1231	Sapphic stanza	4
Fragment 29b	P. Oxy. 1231	Sapphic stanza	5
Fragment 29c	P. Oxy. 1231; P. Oxy. 2166	Sapphic stanza	11
Fragment 29d	P. Oxy. 1231	Sapphic stanza	4
Fragment 29e	P. Oxy. 1231	Sapphic stanza	3
Fragment 29f	P. Oxy. 1231	Sapphic stanza	7
Fragment 29g	P. Oxy. 2081	Sapphic stanza	4
Fragment 29h	P. Oxy. 2166	Sapphic stanza	8
Fragment 29i	P. Oxy. 2166	Sapphic stanza	5
Fragment 30	P. Oxy. 1231	Sapphic stanza	9
Fragment 31	Longinus	Sapphic stanza	17
Fragment 32	Apollonius Dyscolus	Sapphic stanza	2
Fragment 33	Apollonius Dyscolus	Sapphic stanza	2
Fragment 34	Eustathius	Sapphic stanza	5
Fragment 35	Strabo	Sapphic stanza	1
Fragment 36	Etymologicum Genuinum	Sapphic stanza?	1
Fragment 37	Etymologicum Genuinum	Sapphic stanza	3
Fragment 38	Apollonius Dyscolus	Sapphic stanza	1
Fragment 39	Scholiast on Aristophanes' Peace	Sapphic stanza	3
Fragment 40	Apollonius Dyscolus	Sapphic stanza	2
Fragment 41	Apollonius Dyscolus	Sapphic stanza	2
Fragment 42	Scholiast on Pindar	Sapphic stanza	2
Fragment 43	P. Oxy. 1232	]-uu-ux, possibly Glyconic with 2x dactylic expansion	9
Fragment 44	P. Oxy. 1232	Glyconic with 2x dactylic expansion	34 (Note: Voigt numbers the lines up to 34, including l.3a, which is entirely lost)
Fragment 44Aa (Note: 44A Voigt = Alcaeus 304 LP.)	P. Fouad. 239	]-uu-uu-ux, possibly Glyconic with 2x dactylic expansion	12
Fragment 44Ab	P. Fouad. 239	xx-uu-[	10
Fragment 45	Apollonius Dyscolus	Glyconic with 2x dactylic expansion	1
Fragment 46	Herodian	Glyconic with 2x dactylic expansion	2
Fragment 47	Maximus of Tyre	Glyconic with 2x dactylic expansion	2
Fragment 48	Julian	Glyconic with 2x dactylic expansion	2
Fragment 49	Hephaestion; Plutarch	Glyconic with 2x dactylic expansion	2 (Note: Though often presented as a single fragment, the lines come from two separate sources, and Rayor & Lardinois 2014 follow Parker 2006 in taking the fragments as separate.)
Fragment 50	Galen	Glyconic with 2x dactylic expansion	2
Fragment 51	Chrysippus	Glyconic with 2x dactylic expansion	1
Fragment 52	Herodian	Glyconic with 2x dactylic expansion?	1
Fragment 53	Scholiast on Theocritus	Glyconic with 2x choriambic expansion	1
Fragment 54	Julius Pollux	Glyconic with 2x choriambic expansion	1
Fragment 55	Stobaeus	Glyconic with 2x choriambic expansion	4
Fragment 56	Chrysippus	Glyconic with 2x choriambic expansion	3
Fragment 57	Athenaeus	ll.1–2 uncertain; l.3 Glyconic with 2x choriambic expansion	3
Pre-58 (Oxyrhynchus)	P. Oxy. 1787	Acephalous Hipponacteans with 2x choriambic expansion	10
Pre-58 (Cologne)	P. Köln inv.21351+21376	Acephalous Hipponacteans with 2x choriambic expansion	8
Fragment 58	P. Oxy. 1787; P. Köln inv.21351+21376	Acephalous Hipponacteans with 2x choriambic expansion	12 (Note: Voigt's edition groups the 26 lines of Pre-58 (Oxyrhynchus), Sappho 58, and Post-58 (Oxyrhynchus) as a single fragment. A second papyrus which overlapped 12 lines of Sappho 58V, first published in 2004, preserves different text both before and after what is here called Fragment 58. Pre-58 Cologne is apparently also by Sappho. The text which comes after Fragment 58 in the Cologne papyrus is not in an Aeolic metre, and in a different hand; it is therefore not by Sappho. Some, such as Obbink 2011, divide these poems into four separate Sapphic fragments; others, such as Rayor & Lardinois 2014, consider Post-58 (Oxyrhynchus) to be an alternative ending to fragment 58.)
Post-58 (Oxyrhynchus)	P. Oxy. 1787	Acephalous Hipponacteans with 2x choriambic expansion	4
Fragment 59	P. Oxy. 1787	[acephalous hipponacteans with 2x choriambic expansion]	3
Fragment 60	P. Halle. 3	]-uu-u-x, possibly acephalous hipponacteans with 2x choriambic expansion	11
Fragment 61	P. Oxy. 1787	[acephalous hipponacteans with 2x choriambic expansion]	2
Fragment 62	P. Oxy. 1787	x-uu--uu-[, possibly acephalous hipponacteans with 2x choriambic expansion	12
Fragment 63	P. Oxy. 1787	x-uu--uu-[, possibly acephalous hipponacteans with 2x choriambic expansion	10
Fragment 64a	P. Oxy. 1787	[acephalous hipponacteans with 2x choriambic expansion, possibly three line strophes based on acephalous hipponacteans with a shorter third line]	15
Fragment 64b	P. Oxy. 1787	[acephalous hipponacteans with 2x choriambic expansion]	4
Fragment 65	P. Oxy. 1787	x-uu-[, possibly acephalous hipponacteans with 2x choriambic expansion, possibly three line strophes based on acephalous hipponacteans with a shorter third line	11
Fragment 66a	P. Oxy. 1787	[acephalous hipponacteans with 2x choriambic expansion]	3
Fragment 66b	P. Oxy. 1787	[acephalous hipponacteans with 2x choriambic expansion]	4
Fragment 66c	P. Oxy. 1787	[acephalous hipponacteans with 2x choriambic expansion]	3
Fragment 67a	P. Oxy. 1787	x-uu-[, possibly acephalous hipponacteans with 2x choriambic expansion	8
Fragment 67b	P. Oxy. 1787	[acephalous hipponacteans with 2x choriambic expansion]	7
Fragment 68a	P. Oxy. 1787	]uu--uu-u-x, possibly acephalous hipponacteans with 2x choriambic expansion	12
Fragment 68b	P. Oxy. 1787	[acephalous hipponacteans with 2x choriambic expansion]	6
Fragment 69	P. Oxy. 1787	[acephalous hipponacteans with 2x choriambic expansion]	3
Fragment 70	P. Oxy. 1787	]--uu-[	14
Fragment 71	P. Oxy. 1787	]uu--uu-u-x, possibly acephalous hipponacteans with 2x choriambic expansion	8
Fragment 72	P. Oxy. 1787	[acephalous hipponacteans with 2x choriambic expansion]	8
Fragment 73a	P. Oxy. 1787	-]uu-u-x, possibly acephalous hipponacteans with 2x choriambic expansion, possibly three line strophes based on acephalous hipponacteans with a shorter third line	9
Fragment 73b	P. Oxy. 1787	-]uu-u-x, possibly acephalous hipponacteans with 2x choriambic expansion, possibly three line strophes based on acephalous hipponacteans with a shorter third line	3
Fragment 74a	P. Oxy. 1787	[acephalous hipponacteans with 2x choriambic expansion]	6
Fragment 74b	P. Oxy. 1787	[acephalous hipponacteans with 2x choriambic expansion]	3
Fragment 74c	P. Oxy. 1787	[acephalous hipponacteans with 2x choriambic expansion]	4
Fragment 74d	P. Oxy. 1787	[acephalous hipponacteans with 2x choriambic expansion]	3
Fragment 75a	P. Oxy. 1787	[acephalous hipponacteans with 2x choriambic expansion]	8
Fragment 75b	P. Oxy. 1787	[acephalous hipponacteans with 2x choriambic expansion]	5
Fragment 75c	P. Oxy. 1787	[acephalous hipponacteans with 2x choriambic expansion]	5
Fragment 76	P. Oxy. 1787	[acephalous hipponacteans with 2x choriambic expansion]	7
Fragment 77a	P. Oxy. 1787	[acephalous hipponacteans with 2x choriambic expansion]	9
Fragment 77b	P. Oxy. 1787	[acephalous hipponacteans with 2x choriambic expansion]	6
Fragment 77c	P. Oxy. 1787	[acephalous hipponacteans with 2x choriambic expansion]	4
Fragment 78	P. Oxy. 1787	[acephalous hipponacteans with 2x choriambic expansion]	7
Fragment 79	P. Oxy. 1787	[acephalous hipponacteans with 2x choriambic expansion]	6
Fragment 80	P. Oxy. 1787	[acephalous hipponacteans with 2x choriambic expansion]	6
Fragment 81	P. Oxy. 1787; Athenaeus	acephalous hipponacteans with 2x choriambic expansion	7
Fragment 82a	Hephaestion	acephalous hipponacteans with 2x choriambic expansion	1
Fragment 82b	P. Oxy. 1787	acephalous hipponacteans with 2x choriambic expansion	5
Fragment 83	P. Oxy. 1787	[acephalous hipponacteans with 2x choriambic expansion]	7
Fragment 84	P. Oxy. 1787	[acephalous hipponacteans with 2x choriambic expansion]	7
Fragment 85a	P. Oxy. 1787	[acephalous hipponacteans with 2x choriambic expansion]	4
Fragment 85b	P. Oxy. 1787	[acephalous hipponacteans with 2x choriambic expansion]	3
Fragment 86	P. Oxy. 1787	]-uu--uu-u-x, possibly acephalous hipponacteans with 2x choriambic expansion, possibly three line strophes based on acephalous hipponacteans with a shorter third line	8
Fragment 87a	P. Oxy. 1787	[acephalous hipponacteans with 2x choriambic expansion]	9
Fragment 87b	P. Oxy. 1787	[acephalous hipponacteans with 2x choriambic expansion]	4
Fragment 87c	P. Oxy. 1787	[acephalous hipponacteans with 2x choriambic expansion]	2
Fragment 87d	P. Oxy. 2166	[acephalous hipponacteans with 2x choriambic expansion]	10
Fragment 87e	P. Oxy. 2166	[acephalous hipponacteans with 2x choriambic expansion]	4
Fragment 87f	P. Oxy. 2166	[acephalous hipponacteans with 2x choriambic expansion]	8
Fragment 88a	P. Oxy. 2290	-[ ]u--uu-u[-x|| x-[ ]--uu-[u-x|| -[ ]uu-u-x|||	28
Fragment 88b	P. Oxy. 2290	-[ ]u--uu-u[-x|| x-[ ]--uu-[u-x|| -[ ]uu-u-x|||	10
Fragment 90a	P. Oxy. 2293	[commentary]	47 (Note: Voigt divides 90a into Col. II, ll.1–27, and Col. III, ll.11–30)
Fragment 90b	P. Oxy. 2293	[commentary]	15 (Note: Voigt numbers from l.5)
Fragment 90c	P. Oxy. 2293	[commentary]	7
Fragment 90d	P. Oxy. 2293	[commentary]	18
Fragment 90e	P. Oxy. 2293	[commentary]	4
Fragment 91	Hephaestion	acephalous hipponacteans with 2x choriambic expansion	1
Fragment 92	P. Berol. 9722	xx-u[	16
Fragment 93	P. Berol. 9722	]uu-u-	5
Fragment 94	P. Berol. 9722	glyconic || glyconic || glyconic with dactylic expansion|||	29
Fragment 95	P. Berol. 9722	-u-xx-[ xx-uu-[ xx-uu-u[ (possibly the same as fr.96)	16
Fragment 96	P. Berol. 9722	creticus; 3x glyconics; baccheus|||	36
Fragment 97	P. Berol. 9722	uncertain	27 (Note: ll.1–12 and 19–23 are illegible)
Fragment 98a	Pap. Haun. 301	glyconic||glyconic||creticus glyconic|||	12
Fragment 98b	Pap. Mediol. 32	glyconic||glyconic||creticus glyconic|||	9
Fragment 100	Julius Pollux	uncertain	1
Fragment 101	Athenaeus	perhaps: glyconic||glyconic||glyconic with dactylic expansion|||	4
Fragment 101A (Note: 101A V = Alcaeus 347b LP. The fragment cited in Demetrius is not attributed to any author, but comes after three fragments of Sappho. Campbell says that Lobel and Page's identification of the fragment as by Alcaeus is more probable.)	Demetrius, On Style (Note: Demetrius was the author of a stylistic handbook for writers and orators, once identified with Demetrius of Phalerum; this theory is now rejected. The date of his treatise is disputed: one view attributes it to the late-Hellenistic period; another to the Second Sophistic.)	uncertain; perhaps glyconic||hipponactean||	4
Fragment 102	Hephaestion	iambus glyconic bacchius	2
Fragment 103	P. Oxy. 2294	]-uu-uu-u[ _{^}hipp^{2ch} or 3cho ba (Note: Fr. 103 lists the first line of ten poems by Sappho. The first appears to be in an Aeolic metre with dactylic expansion; the remaining nine are all metrically compatible – though they may not all have been the same metre – and can be reconstructed as either acephalous hipponacteans with double choriambic expansion, or as catalectic choriambic tetrameter).	10
Fragment 103Aa	P. Cair. Mediol. 7	[Alcaic stanza]	9
Fragment 103Ab	P. Cair. Mediol. 7	[Alcaic stanza]	4
Fragment 103B (Note: 103B V = inc. auc. 26 LP)	P. Oxy. 2308	]--uu--[	5
Fragment 103Ca (Note: 103C V = 214 LP)	P. Oxy. 2357	uncertain	8
Fragment 103Cb	P. Oxy. 2357	uncertain	6
Fragment 104a	Demetrius, On Style	l.1: 6 dactyls catalectic, l.2 iamb|pherecratean with 2x dactylic expansion	2
Fragment 104b	Himerius	uncertain	1
Fragment 105a	Syrianus on Hermogenes	dactylic hexameter	3
Fragment 105b (Note: 105b Voigt = 105c LP; 105b LP = 218 Voigt)	Demetrius, On Style	6 dactyls catalectic	2
Fragment 106	Demetrius, On Style	6 dactyls catalectic	1
Fragment 107	Apollonius Dyscolus	Possibly dactylic hexameter	1
Fragment 108	Himerius	Possibly dactylic hexameter	1
Fragment 109	Homeric Parsings (Note: The Homeric Parsings, or Epimerismoi, are a Byzantine textbook which explains single words from Homer.)	Possibly dactylic hexameter	1
Fragment 110	Hephaestion	pherecratean with dactylic expansion	3
Fragment 111	Hephaestion	uncertain, perhaps pherecratean||iamb||acephalous pherecratean with dactylic expansion||iamb|||	8
Fragment 112	Hephaestion	choriambus bacchius choriambus bacchius||	5
Fragment 113	Dionysius of Halicarnassus	3x ionics?	2
Fragment 114	Demetrius, On Style	l.1 3 choriambus bacchius; l.2 uncertain	2
Fragment 115	Hephaestion	pherecratean with 2x dactylic expansion	2
Fragment 116	Servius	uncertain	1
Fragment 117	Hephaestion	3 iambs catalectic?	1
Fragment 117A	Hesychius of Alexandria	-uu-uu	1
Fragment 117Ba (Note: 117B V = inc. auc. 24 LP)	Marius Plotius Sacerdos	-uu-uu	1
Fragment 117Bb	Marius Plotius Sacerdos	-uu-uu	1
Fragment 118	Hermogenes	uncertain	2
Fragment 119	Scholiast on Aristophanes' Plutus	uncertain	1
Fragment 120	Etymologicum Magnum	glyconic with choriambic expansion	2
Fragment 121	Stobaeus	uncertain	2
Fragment 122	Athenaeus	uncertain	1
Fragment 123	Ammonius Grammaticus	creticus hipponactean?	1
Fragment 124	Hephaestion	--uu-uu-(x-u-u--)	1
Fragment 125	Scholiast on Aristophanes' Thesmophoriazusae	uncertain	1
Fragment 126	Etymologicum Genuinum	uncertain	1
Fragment 127	Hephaestion	ithyphallicus|ithyphallicus||	1
Fragment 128	Hephaestion	3 choriambs bacchius	1
Fragment 129a	Apollonius Dyscolus	uncertain	1
Fragment 129b	Apollonius Dyscolus	uncertain	1
Fragment 130 (Note: Lobel & Page 1955 assigns ll.1–2 of this fragment to 130 LP, and ll.3–4 to 131 LP. Campbell 1982 and Rayor & Lardinois 2014 follow Lobel and Page on this, but Voigt groups them as a single fragment.)	Hephaestion	glyconic with dactylic expansion	4
Fragment 132	Hephaestion	uncertain	3
Fragment 133	Hephaestion	ia 2io anacl	2
Fragment 134	Hephaestion	3 io anacl	1
Fragment 135	Hephaestion	3 ionics	1
Fragment 136	Scholiast on Sophocles' Electra	pherecratean with 2x dactylic expansion	1
Fragment 137	Aristotle	Alcaic stanza	7
Fragment 138	Athenaeus	ia _{^}gl or ia _{^}gl ia	2
Fragment 139	Philo	uncertain	2
Fragment 140 (Note: 140 Voigt = 104a LP; 140b LP = 214 Voigt)	Hephaestion	pherecratean with 2x choriambic expansion	2
Fragment 141	Athenaeus	ll.1 and 4 acephalous pherecratean? ll.2-3 and 5-6 uncertain	6
Fragment 142	Athenaeus	dactylic hexameter (or pherecratean with 3x dactylic expansion) (Note: Fragments 142 and 143 can be analysed either as dactylic hexameters, or according to Aeolic principles.)	1
Fragment 143	Athenaeus	dactylic hexameter (or pherecratean with 3x dactylic expansion)	1
Fragment 144	Herodian	gl^{xd}	2
Fragment 145	Scholiast on Apollonius Rhodius	xx-uu-?	1
Fragment 146	Tryphon	pherecratean with dactylic expansion	1
Fragment 147	Dio Chrysostom	uncertain	1
Fragment 148	Scholiast on Pindar	uncertain	2
Fragment 149	Apollonius Dyscolus	pher^{xd}?	1
Fragment 150	Maximus of Tyre	glyconic with 2x choriambic expansion?	2
Fragment 151	Etymologicum Genuinum	pherecratean with choriambic expansion	1
Fragment 152	Scholiast on Apollonius Rhodius	gl^{xd}?	2
Fragment 153	Atilius Fortunatianus	uncertain	1
Fragment 154	Hephaestion	_{^}gl ba||	2
Fragment 155	Maximus of Tyre	cr| _{^}hipp^{d} or cr _{^}gl	1
Fragment 156	Demetrius, On Style	possibly glyconic with 2x dactylic expansion	2
Fragment 157	Etymologicum Genuinum	Sapphics?	1
Fragment 158	Plutarch	2 ad?	2
Fragment 159	Maximus of Tyre	uncertain	1
Fragment 160	Athenaeus	Sapphics?	2
Fragment 161	P. Bouriant	uncertain, perhaps _{^}ia pher^{2d}	1
Fragment 162	Choeroboscus	[u-u---u]	1
Fragment 163	Julian	[uu-u-u]	1
Fragment 164	Apollonius Dyscolus	[---uu-]	1
Fragment 165	Apollonius Dyscolus	Sapphic stanza	1
Fragment 166	Athenaeus	gl^{c}	2
Fragment 167	Athenaeus	gl^{xd}	1
Fragment 168	Marius Plotius Sacerdos	Sapphic stanza?	1
Fragment 168A (Note: 168A Voigt = 178 LP)	Etymologicum Genuinum	glyconic?	1
Fragment 168B (Note: Not included in Lobel & Page 1955. Fr.976 PMG.)	Hephaestion	Acephalous hipponacteans	4
Fragment 168C (Note: Not included in Lobel & Page 1955. Fr.964 PMG.)	Demetrius, On Style	Alcaic stanza?	1

== Glosses ==
These fragments are isolated words quoted by other ancient authors, arranged alphabetically.

Fragment Number	Sources
Fragment 169	Scholiast on the Iliad
Fragment 169A	Hesychius, Lexicon
Fragment 170	Strabo, Geography
Fragment 171	Photius, Lexicon
Fragment 172	Maximus of Tyre, Orations
Fragment 173	Choeroboscus on Theodosius
Fragment 174	Orion, Lexicon
Fragment 175	Apollonius Dyscolus, Adverbs
Fragment 176	Athenaeus, Deipnosophistae
Fragment 177	Julius Pollux
Fragment 179	Phrynichus
Fragment 180	Hesychius
Fragment 181	Scholiast on Dionysius of Thrace
Fragment 182	Scholiast on the Iliad
Fragment 183	Porphyry on the Iliad
Fragment 184	Choeroboscus on Theodosius
Fragment 185	Philostratus, Images
Fragment 186	John of Alexandria
Fragment 187	Homeric Parsings
Fragment 188	Maximus of Tyre
Fragment 189	Phrynichus
Fragment 190	Scholiast on the Iliad
Fragment 191	Julius Pollux
Fragment 192	Julius Pollux

== Testimonia ==
The testimonia are ancient accounts of Sappho, her life, and her poetry, which are conventionally included in critical editions of her work. The selection included in these editions varies considerably. Along with the seventy included in Voigt's edition, those given in Campbell's Loeb edition are listed here.

Voigt Number	Campbell Number	Sources
	Fragment 193 (Note: Voigt cites this in her apparatus to fr. 55; Campbell and Neri 2021 both follow Lobel & Page 1955 in listing it as fr. 193.)	Aelius Aristides
Fragment 194		Himerius
Fragment 194A (Note: First published in 1960 by Robert Browning, and so not in Lobel & Page 1955. Included in the addenda to Lobel & Page 1963 as 117A.)		Michael Italikos
Fragment 195		Demetrius, On Style
Fragment 196		Aelius Aristides
Fragment 197		Libanius
Fragment 198a		Scholiast on Apollonius Rhodius
Fragment 198b		Scholiast on Theocritus
Fragment 198c		Pausanias
Fragment 199		Scholiast on Apollonius Rhodius
Fragment 200		Scholiast on Hesiod
Fragment 201		Aristotle
Fragment 203a		Athenaeus
Fragment 203b		Eustathius of Thessalonica
Fragment 203c		Scholiast on Iliad
Fragment 204a		Scholiast on Pindar
Fragment 204b		Pausanias
Fragment 205		Aulus Gellius
Fragment 206		Servius on Virgil
Fragment 207		Servius on Virgil
Fragment 208		Himerius
Fragment 209		Eustathius of Thessalonica
Fragment 210		Scholiast on Theocritus
Fragment 211a	T. 3, 23 (Note: Campbell includes only Pseudo-Paelaphetus under the lemma Sappho 211a; he quotes Suda Σ108 as T. 3 and Strabo 10.2.9 as T. 23)	Pseudo-Palaephatus; Strabo; Alciphron; Plutarch; Scholiast on Libanius; Suda; Servius; Lucian; Scholiast on Lucian; Hesychius
Fragment 211b		Pliny the Elder
Fragment 211c (Note: 211b V = 211c LP; 211c V = 211b LP)		Aelian; Athenaeus; Comes Natalis
Fragment 212		Comes Natalis
Fragment 213		P. Oxy. 2292
Fragment 213Aa		P. Oxy. 2506
Fragment 213Ab		P. Oxy. 2506
Fragment 213Ac		P. Oxy. 2506
Fragment 213Ad		P. Oxy. 2506
Fragment 213Ae		P. Oxy. 2506
Fragment 213Af		P. Oxy. 2506
Fragment 213Ag		P. Oxy. 2506
Fragment 213Ah	T. 14	P. Oxy. 2506
Fragment 213Ai		P. Oxy. 2506
Fragment 213Ak		P. Oxy. 2506
Fragment 213B		PSI (Ommaggio all' XI congresso internationale di papirologia, Florence 1965, 16s.)
	Fragment 213C (Note: List of incipits of poems by Sappho, Alcaeus, and Anacreon. First published in 1973 and therefore not included in Voigt. Campbell 213C = SLG S286 = Neri 306A)	P. Mich. inv. 3498
Fragment 214		Pausanias
	Fragment 214A (Note: Not included in Voigt. Campbell 214A = SLG S259–261)	P. Oxy. 2637
	Fragment 214B (Note: Not included in Voigt. Campbell 214B = SLG S261A)	P. Colon. 5860
	Fragment 214C (Note: Not included in Voigt. Campbell 214C = SLG S476 = Neri 87A)	P. Colon. inv. 8
Fragment 215	T. 45	Demetrius, On Style
Fragment 216		Philostratus
Fragment 217		Philostratus
Fragment 218		Himerius
Fragment 219	T. 20	Maximus of Tyre
Fragment 220		Himerius
Fragment 221	T. 50	Himerius
Fragment 222	T. 47	Menander
Fragment 223	T. 21	Philostratus
Fragment 224	T. 18	Horace
Fragment 225	T. 51	Horace
Fragment 226	T. 29	Scholiast on metre of Pindar
Fragment 227		Hephaestion
Fragment 228	T. 30	Hephaestion
Fragment 229		Hephaestion
Fragment 230	T. 31	Caesius Bassus
Fragment 231		Atilius Fortunatianus
Fragment 232		Hephaestion
Fragment 233	T. 32	Photius
Fragment 234		Servius on Virgil
Fragment 235		Suda
Fragment 236		Hephaestion
Fragment 237	T. 36	Dionysius of Halicarnassus
Fragment 238		Atilius Fortunatianus
Fragment 239		Marius Victorinus
Fragment 240		Scholiast on Hephaestion
Fragment 242		Marius Victorinus
Fragment 243		Servius
Fragment 244	T. 22	Seneca the Younger
Fragment 245	T. 41	Strabo
Fragment 246	T. 37	Aristoxenus (Note: Cited by Plutarch in On Music, under whose name Campbell lists the fragment.)
Fragment 247	T. 38	Menaechmus (Note: Greek historian, c.300 BC.)
Fragment 248	T. 40	Suda
Fragment 249	T. 6	Eusebius
Fragment 250	T. 8	Athenaeus
Fragment 251	T. 5	Parian Chronicle
Fragment 252	T. 1	P. Oxy. 1800
Fragment 253	T. 2	Suda
Fragment 254a (Note: 254 V = 202 LP)		Herodotus
Fragment 254b		Strabo
Fragment 254c		Athenaeus
Fragment 254d		Photius
Fragment 254e		Suda
Fragment 254f		Appendix Proverbiorum
Fragment 254g		John Tzetzes
Fragment 255		Scholiast on Plato
Fragment 256	T. 4	Aelian
Fragment 257		Suda
Fragment 258		Maximus of Tyre
Fragment 259		Scholiast on Lucian
Fragment 260a	T. 34	Horace
Fragment 260b	T. 17	Porphyrio
Fragment 260c	T. 17	Dionysius Latinus (Note: A scholiast on Horace)
Fragment 261		Ovid
Fragment 262		Tatian
Fragment 263	T. 13, 16, 19, 44 (Note: While 263 V refers to the whole of Heroides 15, Campbell quotes four parts of it separately.)	Heroides 15
Fragment 264	T. 7	Strabo

== Uncertain authorship ==
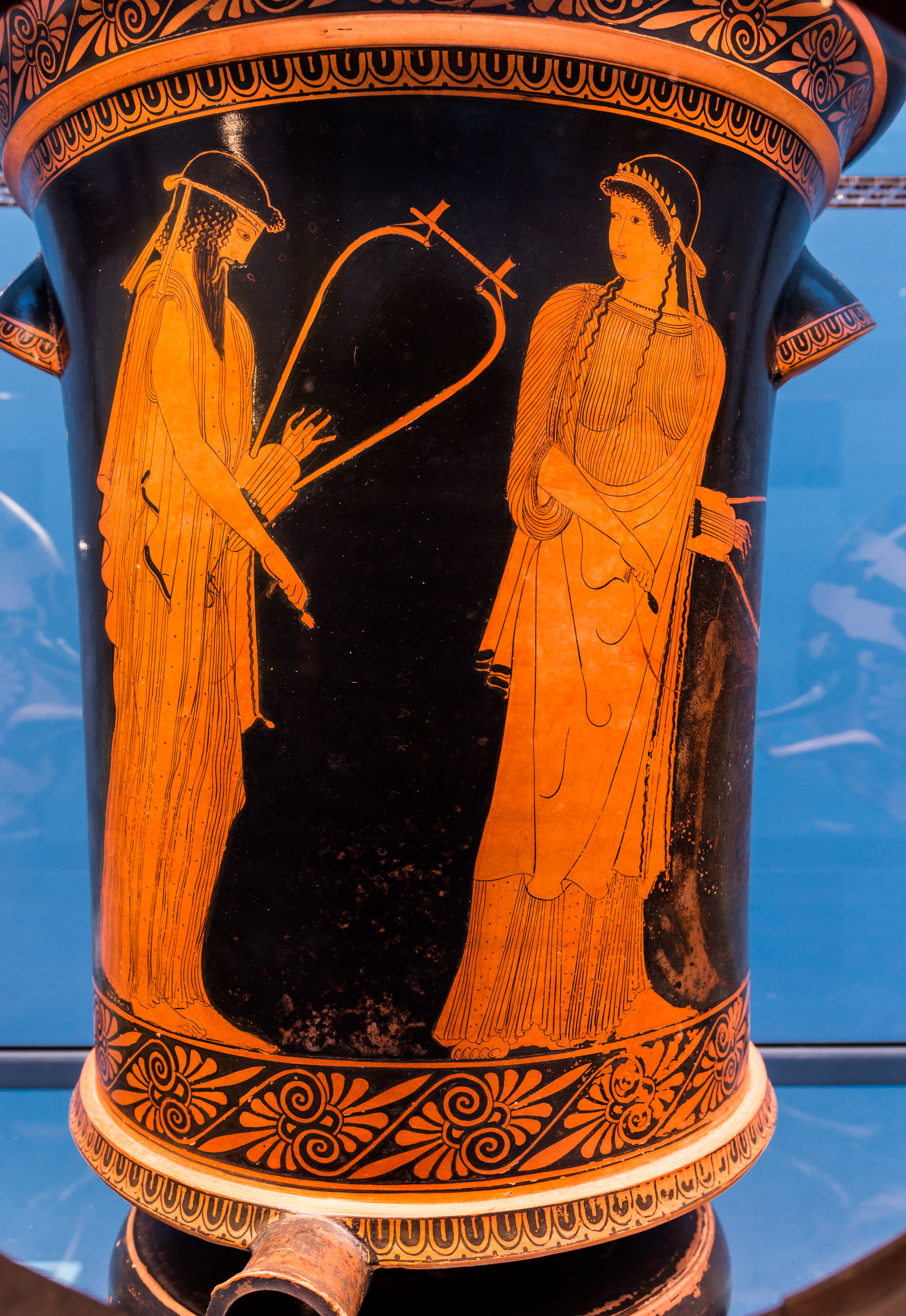
Sappho and Alcaeus, illustrated on an Attic red-figure kalathos by the Brygos Painter. The two poets were contemporaries, and both wrote in the same Aeolic dialect; there are several fragments where it is uncertain which of the two is the author.

Fragments where the authorship is uncertain. In most cases, this is because the dialect is identifiable as Aeolic, but the poem may be by either Sappho or Alcaeus of Mytilene.

Fragment Number	Sources	Meter	Lines
Fragment 1	Scholiast to Odyssey	gl^{xc}	1
Fragment 2	Etymologicum Genuinum		1
Fragment 3	Apollonius Dyscolus		1
Fragment 4	Homeric Parsings	aeol^{xc}	1
Fragment 5a	Herodian	gl^{2d}?	1
Fragment 5b	Herodian		1
Fragment 5c	Herodian		1
Fragment 6	Anonymous grammarian	uncertain	1
Fragment 10	Herodian	Alcaic stanza	2
Fragment 11	Herodian	uncertain	1
Fragment 12	Homeric Parsings	uncertain (u--uuu)	1
Fragment 14	Homeric Parsings	uncertain ((-)u---uu-)	1
Fragment 15a	Zenobius		1
Fragment 15b	Scholiast on Aelius Aristides		1
Fragment 16	Hephaestion	_{^}hipp^{c}	3
Fragment 18	Anonymous	]uu-u-u--, _{^}gl ba?	2
Fragment 19	Apollonius Dyscolus		1
Fragment 20	Joannes Zonaras		1
Fragment 21	Hephaestion	ia _{^}gl ia	2
Fragment 22	Hephaestion	uncertain	1
Fragment 23	Philodemus	cho 2io anacl or hemiepes u-u--	1
Fragment 25	Scholiast on Theocritus	uncertain (5da^)	1
Fragment 25A	Etymologicum Genuinum		1
Fragment 25B	Etymologicum Magnum		1
Fragment 25C (Note: Eustathius says that this poem was variously attributed to Sappho, Alcaeus, and Praxilla of Sicyon. Not included in Lobel & Page 1955, Page lists it among the fragments of Praxilla as fr. 749 PMG, and among the carmina conviviala as fr. 897 PMG.)	Eustathius of Thessalonica		2
Fragment 27	P. Vind. 29777	Sapphic stanza?	3
Fragment 28 (Note: The fragments of poetry preserved in P. Oxy. 2299 are attributed to Alcaeus in Lobel & Page 1955 but listed among the fragments of uncertain authorship by Voigt 1971. A possible reference to Atthis (inc. auc. 31 Voigt = Alcaeus 256 Lobel-Page l.5; cf. frr. 8, 49, 96, 131, and fr. 214C Campbell) and a mention of Abanthis (inc. auc. 35 Voigt = Alcaeus 261b col. I Lobel-Page; cf. fr. 22) suggests that these fragments are authored by Sappho.)	P. Oxy. 2299	uncertain	8
Fragment 29	P. Oxy. 2299		2
Fragment 30	P. Oxy. 2299	uncertain	8
Fragment 31a	P. Oxy. 2299	]u-u--uu-[	15
Fragment 31b	P. Oxy. 2299	]u-u--uu-[	4
Fragment 32	P. Oxy. 2299	uncertain	11
Fragment 33	P. Oxy. 2299		3
Fragment 34a	P. Oxy. 2299	xx-uu[	17
Fragment 34b	P. Oxy. 2299	xx-uu[	5
Fragment 35	P. Oxy. 2299	]u---uu-u--, _{^}hipp^{xc} or 3cho ba	8
Fragment 36a	P. Oxy. 2299	uncertain (-u-[)	6
Fragment 36b	P. Oxy. 2299	uncertain (-u-[)	4
Fragment 37	P. Oxy. 2299	uncertain	13
Fragment 38	P. Oxy. 2299	uncertain (]u--[)	3
Fragment 39	P. Oxy. 2299	uncertain (]uu-[)	3
Fragment 40	P. Oxy. 2299	uncertain (]u--[)	4
Fragment 41	P. Oxy. 2299		7
Fragment 42 (Note: Not included in Lobel-Page; fr. 919 PMG)	P. Oxy. 2378	uncertain	16
Alcaeus 303Aa (Note: Alcaeus 303A Voigt = Sappho 99 LP. Lobel identified the fragment as probably by Sappho when it was first published in 1951; Lobel & Page 1955 also attributed it to Sappho. Campbell 1982, Rayor & Lardinois 2014, and Neri 2021 all follow Lobel and Page in listing it as Sappho 99. Gauthier Liberman excludes it from his edition of Alcaeus as being more likely by Sappho.)	P. Oxy. 2291	_{^}gl || _{^}gl ia	9
Alcaeus 303Ab	P. Oxy. 2291	2 ia || ? || 2 ia |||	15
Alcaeus 303Ac	P. Oxy. 2291	uncertain (ia? gl?)	25

== Spurious epigrams ==
According to the Suda, Sappho wrote epigrams and elegies. Three epigrams in the Greek Anthology are attributed to Sappho, though none of them are authentic. These are nonetheless included in Campbell's and Neri's editions.

Poem number (Neri)	Poem number (Campbell)	Source	Meter	Lines
307	157D	Greek Anthology 6.269	elegiacs	6
308	158D	Greek Anthology 7.489	elegiacs	4
309	159D	Greek Anthology 7.505	elegiacs	2

== Works cited ==
- Acosta-Hughes, Benjamin (2010). Arion's Lyre: Archaic Lyric Into Hellenistic Poetry. Princeton University Press.
- Battezzato, Luigi (2018). "The Structure of Sappho's Books: Metre, Page Layout, and the Hellenistic and Roman Poetry Book". Zeitschrift für Papyrologie und Epigraphik.
- Battezzato, Luigi (2021). "Sappho's Metres and Music". In Finglass, P. J.; Kelly, Adrian (eds.). The Cambridge Companion to Sappho. Cambridge: Cambridge University Press. ISBN 978-1-316-63877-4.
- Burris, Simon; Fish, Jeffrey; Obbink, Dirk (2014). "New Fragments of Book 1 of Sappho". Zeitschrift für Papyrologie und Epigraphik. 189: 1–28. JSTOR 23850356.
- Campbell, D. A., ed. (1982). Greek Lyric 1: Sappho and Alcaeus. Loeb Classical Library. Vol. 142. Cambridge, Massachusetts: Harvard University Press. ISBN 0-674-99157-5.
- Clayman, Dee (2011). "The New Sappho in a Hellenistic Poetry Book". Classics@. 4. Archived from the original on 28 September 2021.
- Dale, Alexander (2024). "Reconstructing the Alexandrian Editions of Sappho, Alcaeus, and Anacreon". In Fehr, Burkhard; Roilos, Panagiotis (eds.). Mythogenesis, Interdiscursivity, Ritual: Studies Presented to Demetrios Yatromanolakis. Leiden: Brill. ISBN 978-90-04-67974-0.
- de Kreij, Mark (2015). "Transmissions and Textual Variants: Divergent Fragments of Sappho's Songs Examined". In Lardinois, André; Levie, Sophie; Hoeken, Hans; Lüthy, Christoph (eds.). Texts, Transmissions, Receptions: Modern Approaches to Narratives. Leiden: Brill.
- Finglass, P. J. (2021a). "Sappho on the Papyri". In Finglass, P. J.; Kelly, Adrian (eds.). The Cambridge Companion to Sappho. Cambridge: Cambridge University Press. ISBN 978-1-316-63877-4.
- Finglass, P. J. (2021b). "Editions of Sappho since the Renaissance". In Finglass, P. J.; Kelly, Adrian (eds.). The Cambridge Companion to Sappho. Cambridge: Cambridge University Press. ISBN 978-1-316-63877-4.
- Lardinois, André (2008). "Someone, I Say, Will Remember Us: Oral Memory in Sappho's Poetry". In Mackay, Anne (ed.). Orality, Literacy, Memory in the Ancient Greek and Roman World. Leiden: Brill.
- Lardinois, André (2011). "The New Sappho Poem (P.Köln 21351 and 21376): Key to the Old Fragments". Classics@. 4. Archived from the original on 28 September 2021.
- Lidov, Joel (2011). "The Meter and Metrical Style of the New Poem". Classics@. 4. Archived from the original on 28 September 2021.
- Lobel, Edgar; Page, Denys (1955). Poetarum Lesbiorum Fragmenta. Oxford.
- Lobel, Edgar; Page, Denys (1963) [1955]. Poetarum Lesbiorum Fragmenta. Oxford.
- Lobel, Edgar; Page, Denys (1974). Supplementum Lyricis Graecis: poetarum lyricorum Graecorum fragmenta quae recens innotuerant. Oxford: Clarendon Press. ISBN 978-0-19-814002-3.
- McEvilley, Thomas (1972). "Sappho, Fragment Two". Phoenix. 26 (4): 323–333. doi:10.2307/1087592. JSTOR 1087592.
- Neri, Camillo, ed. (2021). "Saffo - testimonianze e frammenti: Introduzione, testo critico, traduzione e commento". Saffo: Testimonianze e Frammenti (in Italian). de Gruyter. doi:10.1515/9783110735918. ISBN 9783110735918. S2CID 239602934.
- Obbink, Dirk (2011). "Sappho Fragments 58–59: Text, Apparatus Criticus, and Translation". Classics@. 4. Archived from the original on 28 September 2021.
- Obbink, Dirk (2014). "Two New Poems by Sappho". Zeitschrift für Papyrologie und Epigraphik. 189: 32–49. JSTOR 23850358.
- Page, Denys (1962). Poetae Melici Graeci. Oxford: Clarendon Press.
- Page, Denys (1981). Further Greek Epigrams: Epigrams Before AD 50 from the Greek Anthology and Other Sources, not Included in 'Hellenistic Epigrams' or 'The Garland of Philip'. Cambridge: Cambridge University Press. ISBN 0-521-22903-0.
- Pontani, Filippomaria (2021). "Sappho at Byzantium". In Finglass, P. J.; Kelly, Adrian (eds.). The Cambridge Companion to Sappho. Cambridge: Cambridge University Press. ISBN 978-1-316-63877-4.
- Prauscello, Lucia (2021). "The Alexandrian Edition of Sappho". In Finglass, P. J.; Kelly, Adrian (eds.). The Cambridge Companion to Sappho. Cambridge: Cambridge University Press. ISBN 978-1-316-63877-4.
- Rayor, Diane; Lardinois, André (2014). Sappho: A New Edition of the Complete Works. Cambridge: Cambridge University Press.
- Reed, Scott G. (2005). ""Demetrius", On Style". Classical Rhetorics and Rhetoricians: Critical Studies and Sources.
- Reynolds, Margaret, ed. (2001). The Sappho Companion. London: Vintage. ISBN 9780099738619.
- Skinner, Marylin B. (2011). "Introduction". Classics@. 4. Archived from the original on 28 September 2021.
- Thorsen, Thea S.; Berge, Robert Emil (2019). "Receiving Receptions Received: A New Collection of testimonia Sapphica c.600 BC–AD 1000". In Thorsen, Thea S.; Harrison, Stephen (eds.). Roman Receptions of Sappho. Oxford: Oxford University Press. ISBN 978-0-19-882943-0.
- Voigt, Eva-Maria, ed. (1971). Sappho et Alcaeus: Fragmenta (in Latin). Amsterdam: Polak & Van Gennep.
- West, Martin. L. (2005). "The New Sappho". Zeitschrift für Papyrologie und Epigraphik. 151: 1–9. JSTOR 20191962.
- West, Martin L. (2014). "Nine Poems of Sappho". Zeitschrift für Papyrologie und Epigraphik. 191: 1–12. JSTOR 43909573.
- Yatromanolakis, Dimitrios (1999). "Alexandrian Sappho Revisited". Harvard Studies in Classical Philology. 99: 179–195. doi:10.2307/311481. JSTOR 311481.
