= Etymologicum Genuinum =

Ninth-century Greek encyclopedia

The Etymologicum Genuinum (standard abbreviation E Gen or EtGen) is the conventional modern title given to a lexical encyclopedia compiled at Constantinople in the mid-ninth century. The anonymous compiler drew on the works of numerous earlier lexicographers and scholiasts, both ancient and recent, including Aelius Herodianus, Georgius Choeroboscus, Saint Methodius, Orion of Thebes, Oros of Alexandria and Theognostus the Grammarian. The Etymologicum Genuinum was possibly a product of the intellectual circle around Photius. It was an important source for the subsequent Byzantine lexicographical tradition, including the Etymologicum Magnum, Etymologicum Gudianum and Etymologicum Symeonis.

Modern scholarship discovered the Etymologicum Genuinum only in the nineteenth century. It is preserved in two tenth-century manuscripts, Codex Vaticanus Graecus 1818 (= A) and Codex Laurentianus Sancti Marci 304 (= B; AD 994). Neither contains the earliest recension nor the complete text, but rather two different abridgements. The manuscript evidence and citations in later works suggest that the original title was simply τὸ Ἐτυμολογικόν and later τὸ μέγα Ἐτυμολογικόν. Its modern name was coined in 1897 by Richard Reitzenstein, who was the first to edit a sample section. The Etymologicum Genuinum remains for the most part unpublished except for specimen glosses. Two editions are in long-term preparation, one begun by Ada Adler and continued by Klaus Alpers, the other by François Lasserre and Nikolaos Livadaras. The latter edition is published under the title Etymologicum Magnum Genuinum, but this designation is not widely used and is a potential source of confusion with the twelfth-century lexical compendium conventionally titled the Etymologicum Magnum.

== Bibliography ==
Partial editions

- K. Alpers (1969), Bericht über Stand und Methode der Ausgabe des Etymologicum Genuinum (mit einer Ausgabe des Buchstaben Λ) ([Det Kongelige Danske Videnskabernes Selskab Historisk-filosofiske Meddelelser 44.3] Copenhagen).
- G. Berger (ed.) (1972), Etymologicum genuinum et Etymologicum Symeonis (Β) ([Beiträge zur klassischen Philologie, Hft 45] Meisenheim am Glan). ISBN 3-445-00974-0
- A. Colonna (ed.) (1967), Etymologicum genuinum, littera Λ ([Quaderni Athena 4] Rome).
- F. Lasserre and N. Livadaras (eds.) (1976- ), Etymologicum Magnum Genuinum, Symeonis Etymologicum una cum Magna Grammatica, Etymologicum Magnum Auctum, vol. 1 (Rome 1976); 2 (Athens 1992).

Studies

- C. Calame (1970), "Etymologicum genuinum. Les citations de poètes lyriques" (Roma, Ateneo, 1970).
- K. Alpers (1989), ‘Eine byzantinische Enzyklopädie des 9. Jahrhunderts. Zu Hintergrund, Entstehung und Geschichte des griechischen Etymologikons in Konstantinopel und im italogriechischen Bereich’ in G. Cavallo, G. de Gregorio and M. Maniaci (eds.), Scritture, Libri e Testi nelle aree provinciali di Bisanzio (Atti del seminario di Erice, 18-25 settembre 1988) (Spoleto) 1:235-69
- K. Alpers (1990), ‘Griechische Lexicographie in Antike und Mittelalter. Dargestellt an ausgewählten Beispielen’ in H.-A. Koch and A. Krup-Eber (eds.), Welt der Information. Wissen und Wissensvermittlung in Geschichte und Gegenwart (Stuttgart) 14–38.
- K. Alpers (2001), ‘Lexicographie (B.I-III)’ in G. Üding and W. Jens (eds.), Historisches Wörterbuch der Rhetorik 2 (Tübingen) 194–210.
- L.W. Daly (1967), Contributions to a History of Alphabetization in Antiquity and the Middle Ages ([Collection Latomus] Brussels).
- P. Rance, (2007), ‘The Etymologicum Magnum and the “Fragment of Urbicius”’, Greek, Roman and Byzantine Studies 47:193-224 : https://web.archive.org/web/20100614072632/http://duke.edu/web/classics/grbs/FTexts/47/Rance.pdf
- R. Reitzenstein (1897), Geschichte der griechischen Etymologika: ein Beitrag zur Geschichte der Philologie in Alexandria und Byzanz (Leipzig; repr. Amsterdam 1964).
