= Tithonus poem =

Poem by the archaic Greek poet Sappho

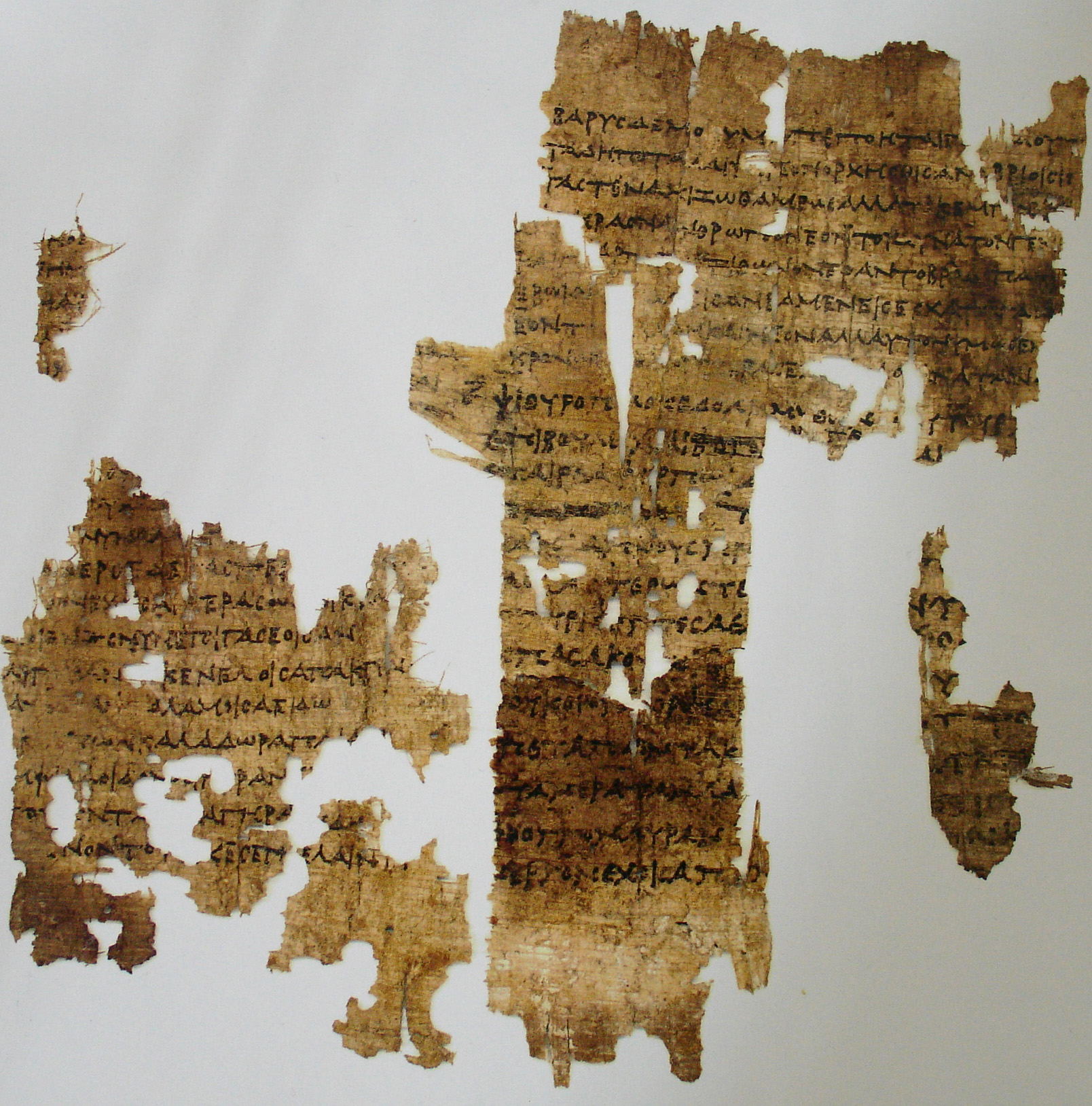
Fragments of the Cologne papyri, dating to the third century BC, preserve twelve lines of the Tithonus poem. Published in 2004, the finds drew international media attention.

The Tithonus poem, also known as the old age poem or (with fragments of another poem by Sappho discovered at the same time) the New Sappho, (Note: In 2014, more fragments of Sappho were discovered, including five previously-unknown stanzas of a poem commonly called the Brothers Poem. These discoveries have also been referred to as the "New Sappho".) is a poem by the archaic Greek poet Sappho. It is part of fragment 58 in Eva-Maria Voigt's edition of Sappho. (Note: Different editions of Sappho's poems follow different numbering systems. Voigt's numeration is one of the most commonly used. In most cases, including that of fragment 58, it matches the older Lobel-Page system.) The poem is from Book IV of the Alexandrian edition of Sappho's poetry. It was first published in modern times in 1922, after a fragment of papyrus on which it was partially preserved was discovered at Oxyrhynchus in Egypt; further papyrus fragments whose contents were published in 2004 almost completed the poem, drawing international media attention. One of very few substantially complete works by Sappho, it deals with the effects of ageing. There is scholarly debate about where the poem ends, as four lines previously thought to have been part of the poem are not found on the 2004 papyrus.

== Preservation ==
Two lines of the poem are preserved in Athenaeus' Deipnosophistae. In addition to this quotation, the poem is known from two papyri: one discovered at Oxyrhynchus in Egypt and first published in 1922; the other first published in 2004. The lines quoted by Athenaeus are part of the poem as preserved on the Oxyrhynchus papyrus, but not the Cologne papyrus.

=== Oxyrhynchus papyrus ===
Part of the Tithonus poem was originally published in 1922 from lines on a fragment of papyrus from Oxyrhynchus. This fragment (Note: Fragment 1 of Papyrus Oxyrhynchus 1787.) preserved part of 27 lines of Sappho's poetry, including the Tithonus poem. (Note: 27 is the line count that appears in the Lobel-Page and Voigt editions of Sappho; Arthur Surridge Hunt counted 26.) The papyrus appears to be part of a copy of Book IV of the Alexandrian edition of Sappho's poetry, as all of the poems appear to be in the same metre. From the handwriting, the papyrus can be dated to the second century AD. Today the papyrus is part of the collection of the Sackler Library in Oxford University.

=== Cologne papyrus ===
In 2004, Martin Gronewald and Robert Daniel published poetry from three fragments of papyrus from the Cologne Papyrus Collection, which taken with the existing fragment from Oxyrhynchus provided the almost complete text to five stanzas of the poem. The Cologne papyrus, preserved on cartonnage, is from the early third century BC, making it the oldest known papyrus containing a poem by Sappho. Dirk Obbink suggested that the cartonnage came from the Faiyum Oasis in Egypt.

The papyrus had been purchased by the University of Cologne in 2002 from a private collector. The provenance of the Cologne papyrus is suspect; the manuscript's seller claimed it had been in an anonymous Swiss collection since "the early 1970s," suspiciously coincident with the UNESCO 1970 Convention. There is no documentation of past purchase or ownership.

The papyrus is part of an anthology of poetry, with poems on similar themes grouped together. Along with the Tithonus poem, two others are preserved on the papyrus published by Gronewald and Daniel: one in the same metre, one written in a different hand and in a different metre. The metre of this last poem has characteristics which do not appear in any known metre used by the Lesbian poets. (Note: Specifically, sequences of more than two short syllables are otherwise unknown in Lesbian poetry, yet appear in this fragment.) It also contains word forms which appear not to be in the Aeolic dialect used by Sappho, and refers to the myth of Orpheus in a form not known to have existed in Sappho's time. For these reasons, the poem cannot be by Sappho.

== Poem ==
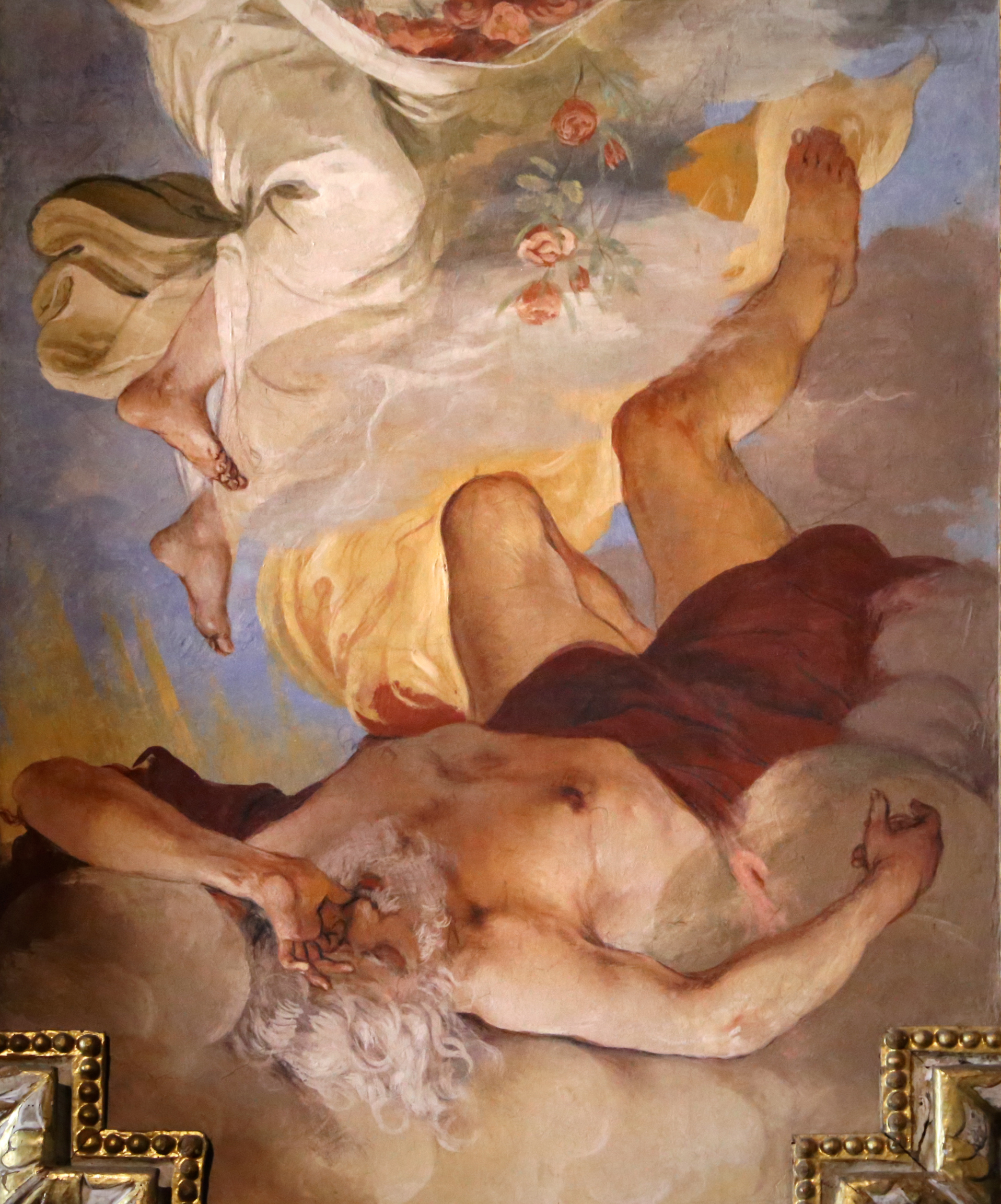
Tithonus, detail of Aurora e Titone c. 1635, Giovanni da San Giovanni

The Tithonus poem is twelve lines long, and is in a metre called "acephalous Hipponacteans with internal double-choriambic expansion". It is the fourth poem by Sappho to be sufficiently complete to treat as an entire work, along with the Ode to Aphrodite, fragment 16, and fragment 31; a fifth, the Brothers Poem, was discovered in 2014.

The poem is written as an exhortation to a group of young women, putting forward the singer as an example to emulate. It discusses the singer's old age, and tells the audience that while they too will grow old and lose their beauty, their musical abilities will be retained. Anton Bierl suggests that it was originally composed as a didactic work, intended to teach young women about beauty and mortality. It is one of a number of Sappho's poems which discuss old age.

The poem's common name comes from the Greek myth of Tithonus, which is mentioned in lines 9 to 12. According to legend Tithonus was a Trojan prince, loved by Eos, the goddess Dawn. She asked that Zeus make her lover immortal; he granted the request, but as she did not ask for eternal youth for Tithonus, he continued to age for eternity. The story of Tithonus was popular in archaic Greek poetry, though the reference to him in this poem seems out of place, according to Rawles. However, Page duBois notes that the use of a mythical exemplum to illustrate the point of a poem, such as the story of Tithonus in this poem, is a characteristic feature of Sappho's poetry – duBois compares it to Sappho's use of the story of Helen in fragment 16. Martin Litchfield West considers that these lines seem like a weak ending to the poem, though Tithonus functions as a parallel to Sappho in her old age. The version of the Tithonus myth told in Sappho's poem is similar to that in the Homeric Hymn to Aphrodite.

=== Text ===
ὔμμες τάδε Μοίσαν ἰ]ο̣κ[ό]λ̣πων κάλα δῶρα, παῖδες, 1
σπουδάσδετε καὶ τὰ]ν φιλάοιδον λιγύραν χελύνναν·
ἔμοι δ’ ἄπαλον πρίν] π̣οτ̣’ [ἔ]ο̣ντα χρόα γῆρας ἤδη
κατέσκεθε, λεῦκαι δ’ ἐγ]ένοντο τρίχες ἐκ μελαίναν,
βάρυς δέ μ’ ὀ [θ]ῦμο̣ς πεπόηται, γόνα δ’ οὐ φέροισι, 5
τὰ δή ποτα λαίψη̣ ρ’ ἔον ὄρχησθ’ ἴσα νεβρίοισι.

τὰ ⟨νῦν⟩ στεναχίσδω θαμέως· ἀλλὰ τί κεν ποείην;
ἀ̣γ̣ήραον, ἄνθρωπον ἔοντ’, οὐ δύνατον γένεσθαι.
καὶ γάρ π̣[ο]τ̣α̣ Τίθωνον ἔφαντο βροδόπαχυν Αὔων,
ἔρωι δε̣δ̣άθ̣εισαν, βάμεν’ εἰς ἔσχατα γᾶς φέροισα[ν, 10
ἔοντα̣ [κ]ά̣λ̣ο̣ν καὶ νέον, ἀλλ’ αὖτον ὔμως ἔμαρψε
χρόνωι π̣ό̣λ̣ι̣ο̣ν̣ γῆρας, ἔχ̣ [ο]ν̣τ̣’ ἀθανάταν ἄκοιτιν. 12

Translation:

—via R. Janko, see also W. Annis

=== Metre ===
The metre of the Tithonus poem was already known, before the discovery of the Cologne papyrus, from four quotations of Sappho. Two of these are preserved in the Enchiridion of Hephaestion; he describes the metre as aiolikon and says that Sappho used it frequently. The metre is of the form "× – ◡ ◡ – – ◡ ◡ – – ◡ ◡ – ◡ – –", (Note: × denotes an anceps, a syllable that can be long or short; – a longum, a long syllable; and ◡ a brevis, a short syllable.) which is part of the larger class of aeolic metres. The poems in this metre by Sappho are conventionally thought to have been from the fourth book of the Alexandrian edition, though no direct evidence either confirms or denies this.

=== Continuation after line 12 ===
Before the Cologne papyri were published in 2004, lines 11 to 26 of Papyrus Oxyrhynchus 1787 were considered to be a single poem, fragment 58 in the Lobel-Page (and subsequently Voigt) numbering systems. The poem on the Cologne papyrus, however, only contains 12 lines. These begin with line 11 of P. Oxy. 1787, confirming the long-standing suggestion that the poem began there. The Cologne version of the poem is thus missing what were long believed to be the final four lines of the poem.

Much of the scholarly discussion of the poem has concerned the difference between the endings of the Tithonus poem preserved in the two papyri. Scholars disagree about how this should be interpreted. André Lardinois lists possible explanations which have been put forward: firstly that the Cologne papyrus did not contain the full poem, but only the first twelve lines; secondly that the poem does end after line twelve and the final lines on the Oxyrhynchus papyrus were part of another poem; and thirdly that there were two different endings for the poem, one at line twelve and one continuing on to line sixteen.

West argues that the four lines missing from the Cologne papyrus were part of a separate poem, though Lardinois comments that there is no evidence in the Oxyrhynchus papyrus to confirm or deny this. (Note: The symbol known as a coronis was used to mark the ends of works and sections on Greek papyri. Though there is no evidence of one surviving on the Oxyrhynchus papyrus, the papyrus is fragmentary, and there is nothing which indicates that the lines are part of the poem.) However, other scholars, including Gronewald and Daniel, who originally published the Cologne fragments, believe that the poem did continue for these four lines. Lardinois suggests that there may have been two versions of the poem current in antiquity, one ending after the twelfth line, the other continuing to line 16. Gregory Nagy agrees, arguing that the two versions were appropriate for different performance contexts.

If the four contested lines were part of the Tithonus poem, its tone would have changed significantly. The sixteen-line version of the poem has a much more optimistic ending than the twelve-line version, expressing hope for an afterlife.

== Reception ==
The publication of the Cologne papyri in 2004, making the Tithonus poem almost complete, drew international attention from both scholars and the popular press. The discovery was covered in newspapers in the US and the UK, as well as online. The Daily Telegraph described the discovery as "the rarest of gifts", while Marilyn B. Skinner said that the discovery was the find of a lifetime for classicists.

Since the discovery, there has been a significant amount of scholarship on the poem. At the 138th annual meeting of the American Philological Association, two separate panels discussed the poems, and papers based on these panels were later published as The New Sappho on Old Age, edited by Marilyn B. Skinner and Ellen Greene. At least two other collections of essays on the Cologne papyri have been published. The discovery has been seen as particularly significant for understanding the transmission and reception of Sappho's poetry in the ancient world.

== Works cited ==
- Bierl, Anton (2016). "Visualizing the Cologne Sappho: Mental Imagery through Chorality, the Sun, and Orpheus". In Cazzatto, V.; Lardinois, A. P. M. H. (eds.). The Look of Lyric: Greek Song and the Visual. Leiden: Brill.
- Brown, Christopher G. (2011). "To the Ends of the Earth: Sappho on Tithonus". Zeitschrift für Papyrologie und Epigraphik. 178. JSTOR 1616747.
- Clayman, Dee (2011). "The New Sappho in a Hellenistic Poetry Book". Classics@. 4. Archived from the original on 2019-03-02.
- de Kreij, Mark (2016). "Ουκ εστι Σαπφους τουτο το ασμα: Variants of Sappho's Songs in Athenaeus' Deipnosophistae". Journal of Hellenic Studies. 136.
- duBois, Page (2011). "Sappho, Tithonos, and the Ruins of the Body". European Review of History. 18 (5–6): 663–672. doi:10.1080/13507486.2011.618317. S2CID 159963943.
- Ezard, John (24 June 2005). "After 2,600 years, the world gains a fourth poem by Sappho". The Guardian.
- Fenton, Ben (25 June 2005). "Fourth work of Sappho is revealed to the world". The Daily Telegraph.
- Hammerstaedt, Jürgen (2011). "The Cologne Sappho: Its Discovery and Textual Constitution". Classics@. 4. Archived from the original on 2019-04-30.
- Lardinois, André (2011). "The New Sappho Poem (P.Köln 21351 and 21376): Key to the Old Fragments". Classics@. 4. Archived from the original on 2019-03-24.
- Lidov, Joel (2011). "The Meter and Metrical Style of the New Poem". Classics@. 4. Archived from the original on 2019-03-02.
- Mazza, Roberta (2024). Stolen fragments: black markets, bad faith, and the illicit trade in ancient artefacts. Stanford, California: Redwood Press. ISBN 978-1503632509.
- Mendelsohn, Daniel (16 March 2015). "Girl, Interrupted: Who Was Sappho?". The New Yorker.
- Nagy, Gregory (2011). "The 'New Sappho' Reconsidered in the Light of the Athenian Reception of Sappho". Classics@. 4. Archived from the original on 2019-04-30.
- Nongbri, Brent (2022). "The Ethics of Publication: Papyri". Bryn Mawr Classical Review.
- Obbink, Dirk (2011). "Sappho Fragments 58–59: Text, Apparatus Criticus, and Translation". Classics@. 4. Archived from the original on 2019-03-02.
- Pitotto, Elisabetta (2010). "Review of Greene and Skinner, The New Sappho on Old Age". Bryn Mawr Classical Review.
- Rawles, Richard (2006). "Notes on the Interpretation of the 'New Sappho'". Zeitschrift für Papyrologie und Epigraphik. 157.
- Rayor, Diane; Lardinois, André (2014). Sappho: A New Translation of the Complete Works. Cambridge: Cambridge University Press.
- Skinner, Marilyn B. (2011). "Introduction". Classics@. 4. Archived from the original on 2019-03-03.
- West, Martin. L. (2005). "The New Sappho". Zeitschrift für Papyrologie und Epigraphik. 151.
- Yatromanolakis, Dimitrios (2008). "P. Colon. inv. 21351+21376 and P. Oxy. 1787 fr. 1: Music, Cultural Politics, and Hellenistic Anthologies". Ελληνικά. 58 (2).
