= Theodosius of Alexandria =

Theodosius of Alexandria may refer to:

- Theodosius of Alexandria (grammarian) (c. 3rd century CE), author of a work on inflection of Greek nouns and verbs
- Patriarch Theodosius I of Alexandria (died 567)
- Pope Theodosius II of Alexandria (fl. 730–742)
- Patriarch Theodosius II of Alexandria (fl. 12th century)
- Pope Theodosius III of Alexandria (fl. 1293–1300)
