= Astyages (disambiguation) =

Astyages (Ancient Greek: Ἀστυάγης) can refer to several figures from ancient history and mythology:

- Astyages, ancient Median king of the 6th century BCE
- Astyages (grammarian), ancient Greek grammarian of uncertain date
- Astyages, a minor character in the Metamorphoses of Ovid who is turned to stone at the sight of Medusa's head
