= Midnight poem =

Poem possibly written by Sappho

The Midnight poem is a fragment of Greek lyric poetry preserved by the Alexandrian grammarian Hephaestion. It is possibly by the archaic Greek poet Sappho, and is fragment 168 B in Eva-Maria Voigt's edition of her works. It is also sometimes known as PMG fr. adesp. 976 – that is, fragment 976 from Denys Page's Poetae Melici Graeci, not attributed by him to any author (fragmenta adespota). The poem, four lines describing a woman alone at night, is one of the best-known surviving pieces of Greek lyric poetry. Long thought to have been composed by Sappho, it is one of the most frequently translated and adapted of the works ascribed to her.

== Poem ==
Δέδυκε μὲν ἀ σελάννα
καὶ Πληΐαδες, μέσαι δέ
νύκτες, πάρα δ' ἔρχετ' ὤρα,
ἔγω δὲ μόνα κατεύδω. (Note: As rendered in E. M. Voigt's Sappho et Alcaeus. Denys Page's Poetae Melici Graecae has "σελάνα" rather than "σελάννα" on line 1 and "ἔρχεθ'" rather than "ἔρχετ'" on line 3.)

The moon and the Pleiades have set,
it is midnight,
time is passing,
but I sleep alone.

Four lines of the poem survive, (Note: Hephaestion arranges the poem over two lines; the four-line arrangement was first restored by Theodor Bergk.) preserved in Hephaestion's Enchiridion, a treatise on meter in Greek poetry. Most scholars believe that this is only a fragment of a longer original, though Diskin Clay argues that the poem is complete as it is. The poem is composed in an Aeolic meter known as the hagesichorean, (Note: Also known as an acephalous hipponactean, abbreviated as ^hipp. The name "hagesichorean" comes from Alcman's use of the metre in his first partheneion, a song for a chorus of young girls who praise Hagesichora, the leader of the chorus.) in which lines are of the form "x – u u – u – –", where "–" represents a long syllable, "u" represents a short syllable, and "x" represents an anceps.

The poem describes the speaker – a woman, as the adjective "μόνα" ("alone") in the final line is feminine – lying alone at night. Clay suggests that this was intended to allude to, and contrast with, the myth of Selene and her mortal lover Endymion, who were reunited each night. Other authors, such as Ulrich von Wilamowitz-Moellendorf, have read the poem as describing the speaker waiting for a lover. Paula Reiner and David Kovacs note, however, that the poem says nothing explicitly about waiting. Instead, they suggest, the poem might equally well be read as a generalised complaint of loneliness rather than being specifically concerned with a lover's absence; Odysseus Tsagarakis says that "the feeling of loneliness is most beautifully expressed by Sappho" in this fragment.

== Authorship ==
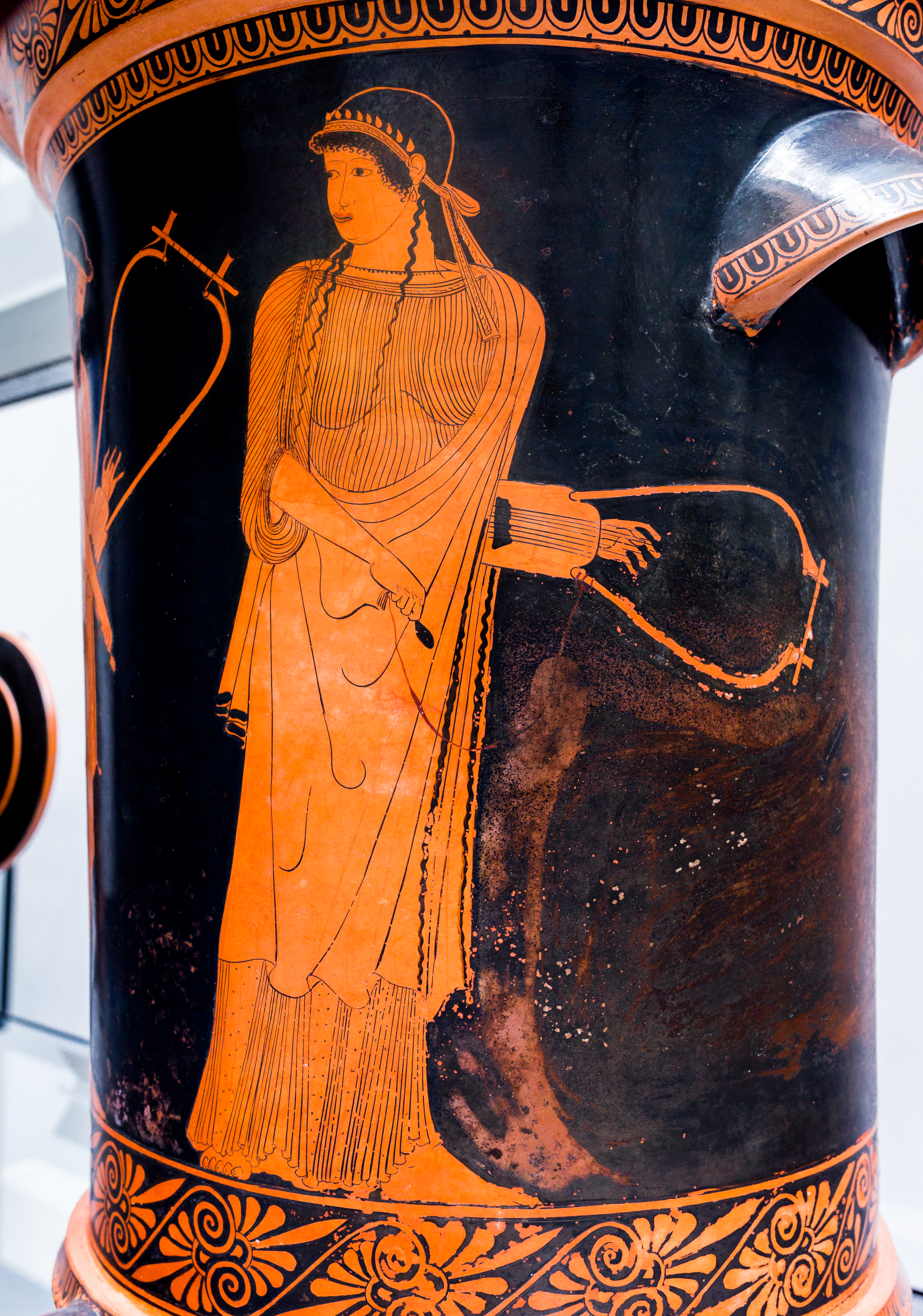
The midnight poem has often been attributed to Sappho

The midnight poem has generally been attributed to Sappho since the Renaissance, initially by Arsenius Apostolius. However, Hephaestion does not provide any attribution for the fragment, and influential classicists such as Edgar Lobel, Denys Page and Ulrich von Wilamowitz-Moellendorf have questioned this attribution. Philologists generally consider the poem a folk song, attributable to no specific author.

Some classicists still attribute the poem to Sappho. It is included by Eva-Maria Voigt in her 1971 edition of Sappho's poems, and modern editors and translators – including David Campbell, Diane Rayor and André Lardinois, and Camillo Neri – follow her in including the fragment amongst Sappho's poems. Clay has argued that the poem is by Sappho, and Reiner and Kovacs argue that it was probably included in the Alexandrian edition of Sappho's works, though they note that this does not rule out the poem being a Hellenistic composition later wrongly attributed to Sappho.

Denys Page argues against attributing the poem to Sappho on the basis of its dialect, which he believes is not the Aeolic dialect used by Sappho. He identifies three separate features which he does not believe are consistent with the archaic Lesbian dialect found elsewhere in the works of Sappho and Alcaeus. Those who believe that Sappho did compose the poem argue that the evidence that the poem was not in Aeolic is "at best ambiguous"; (Note: Some word forms used in the poem, such as σελαννα, appear to suggest that the poem was in Aeolic; the context in which Hephaestion cites the poem implies that the poem is in Aeolic; and the poem can be plausibly emended so that it is in Aeolic.) In his 2021 edition of Sappho's works, Neri cites the poem's Lesbian dialect in support of Sappho's authorship.

Other scholars have argued against Sapphic authorship of the fragment on the basis that Hephaestion does not attribute the poem to her; that the meter is otherwise unknown in Sappho's fragments; and that the poem "seems wrong for Sappho". Those in favour of Sappho's authorship find these arguments unconvincing: Diskin Clay argues that the fact that the poem is not attributed to Sappho in the surviving abbreviated version of Hephaestion's Enchiridion "should have no weight in the balance", while Reiner and Kovacs dismiss Wilamowitz's argument that the content of the poem was wrong for Sappho on the grounds that it was primarily driven by a desire to protect "Sappho's good name".

== Dramatic setting ==
The poem mentions two astronomical observations: that both the moon and the Pleiades had been visible, and then set, before midnight. Based on these, Mebius and Herschberg calculate that the moon described in the poem is in a crescent phase. The information about the Pleiades has been used to calculate the time of year that the poem is set: according to Mebius and Herschburg the dramatic date of the poem is between mid-January and late March.

Reiner and Kovacs have suggested that the common interpretation of the poem, that the Pleiades have set, is incorrect: they argue that the poem should be emended to read that the Pleiades are "in mid-heaven". If this reading is correct, then the dramatic date of the poem would be some months earlier than that suggested by Mebius and Herschberg.

== Legacy ==
The poem is considered "one of the loveliest of all Greek lyrics", despite its briefness and simplicity. Wilamowitz considered the poem to be a "charming folk song", and Page too said that it has "a certain charm".

Sappho's work has influenced many later poets, from Catullus' translation of Sappho 31 to the imagism of Ezra Pound, H.D., and Richard Aldington. Clay identifies a number of classical works which may allude to the midnight poem, including Aristophanes' play Ecclesiazusae and the fifteenth of Ovid's Heroides. The midnight poem is one of the most-frequently adapted of the poems attributed to Sappho – according to Clay, only fragment 31 has been more often translated. In English, the midnight poem inspired Tennyson's "Mariana", and "Mariana in the South". It also influenced A. E. Housman, who wrote three different poems based on the fragment: "The weeping Pleiads wester" and "The rainy Pleiads wester" from More Poems and "The half-moon westers low, my love" from Last Poems. Other poems apparently alluding to the "midnight poem" include Elizabeth Bishop's "Insomnia" – whose first line fits the meter used in the Greek fragment, and which shares setting and tone with it – and H.D.'s "Night", which is thematically linked with the poem, also concerned with the passage of time and isolation.

== Works cited ==
- Campbell, David A., ed. (1982). Greek Lyric I: Sappho and Alcaeus. Cambridge, Massachusetts: Harvard University Press.
- Clay, Diskin (1970). "Fragmentum Adespotum 976". Transactions and Proceedings of the American Philological Association. 101: 119–129. doi:10.2307/2936043. JSTOR 2936043.
- Clay, Diskin (2011). "Sappho, Selanna, and the Poetry of the Night". Giornale Italiano di Filologia. 2 (1–2): 3–11. doi:10.1484/j.gif.5.101931.
- Gellar-Goad, T. H. M. (2015). "Sappho and Elizabeth Bishop on Lonely Moonlit Nights". Society for Classical Studies.
- Golston, C.; Riad, T. (2005). "The Phonology of Greek Lyric Meter" (PDF). Journal of Linguistics. 41: 77–115. doi:10.1017/S0022226704003068. S2CID 145093026. Archived from the original (PDF) on 2018-08-27.
- Mebius, I. S.; Herschberg, J. E. (1990). "ΔΕΔΥΚΕ ΜΕΝ Α ΣΕΛΑΝΝΑ". Mnemosyne. 43 (1). doi:10.1163/156852590x00090.
- Most, Glenn (1995). "Reflecting Sappho". Bulletin of the Institute of Classical Studies. 40: 15–38. doi:10.1111/j.2041-5370.1995.tb00462.x.
- Neri, Camillo, ed. (2021). Saffo: Testimonianze e Frammenti (in Italian). de Gruyter. doi:10.1515/9783110735918. ISBN 9783110735918. S2CID 239602934.
- Page, Denys (1958). "ΔΕΔΥΚΕ ΜΕΝ Α ΣΕΛΑΝΝΑ". The Journal of Hellenic Studies. 78. doi:10.2307/628925. JSTOR 628925. S2CID 163937527.
- Page, Denys (1962). Poetae Melici Graecae. Oxford: Oxbow Books.
- Peterson, Linda H. (1994). "Sappho and the Making of Tennysonian Lyric". ELH. 61 (1): 121–137. doi:10.1353/elh.1994.0010. S2CID 162385092.
- Rayor, Diane; Lardinois, André (2014). Sappho: A New Translation of the Complete Works. Cambridge: Cambridge University Press.
- Reiner, Paula; Kovacs, David (1993). "ΔΕΔΥΚΕ ΜΕΝ Α ΣΕΛΑΝΝΑ: The Pleiades in Mid-Heaven (PMG Frag.Adesp. 976 = Sappho Fr. 168 B Voigt)". Mnemosyne. 46 (2). doi:10.1163/156852593X00466.
- Reynolds, Margaret (2001). The Sappho Companion. London: Vintage.
- Sanford, Eva Matthews (1942). "Classical Poets in the Work of A. E. Housman". The Classical Journal. 37 (4): 222–224. JSTOR 3291612.
- Tsagarakis, Odysseus (1986). "Broken Hearts and the Social Circumstances in Sappho's Poetry" (PDF). Rheinisches Museum für Philologie. 129 (1): 1–17. JSTOR 41233569.
- Voigt, E. M. (1971). Sappho et Alcaeus (in Latin). Amsterdam: Polak & Van Gennep.
- Wilamowitz-Moellendorf, Ulrich von (1886). Isyllos von Epidauros (in German). Berlin: Weidmannsche Buchhandlung.
