= Oros of Alexandria =

Byzantine lexicographer and grammarian

Oros of Alexander (Ancient Greek: Ὦρος ὁ Ἀλεξανδρεύς, also called Orus) was a late classical/Byzantine lexicographer and grammarian active in the mid-5th century. According to the Suda he was born in Alexandria and taught in Constantinople. The Suda lists ten titles by him, but little of his work survives.

Fragments of his lexicon of Attic usages are preserved in later lexica. This work sought to counter the hyperatticist doctrine favoured by some contemporary lexicographers, who were inspired by the works of the 2nd-century grammarian Phrynichus. Oros' work was influential in the later Byzantine lexicographical tradition.

The codex Messinensis graecus 118 contains a fragment of a work on orthography concerning the use of the iota subscript. This is sometimes styled the Lexicon Messanense.

Fragments of two other works survive, one a list of words with more than one meaning, the other a list of toponyms and their supposed etymologies.

== Bibliography ==
- Klaus Alpers (1981), Das attizistische Lexikon des Oros ([Sammlung griechischer und lateinischer Grammatiker 4] Berlin).
- Klaus Alpers (1990), Griechische Lexicographie in Antike und Mittelalter. Dargestellt an ausgewählten Beispielen in H.-A. Koch and A. Krup-Eber (eds.), Welt der Information. Wissen und Wissensvermittlung in Geschichte und Gegenwart (Stuttgart) 14–38.
- Klaus Alpers (2001), Lexicographie (B.I-III) in G. Üding and W. Jens (eds.), Historisches Wörterbuch der Rhetorik 2 (Tübingen) 194–210.
- R. Reitzenstein (1897), Geschichte der griechischen Etymologika: ein Beitrag zur Geschichte der Philologie in Alexandria und Byzanz (Leipzig; repr. Amsterdam 1964).
- N.G. Wilson (1983), Scholars of Byzantium (London) 51f.
