= Astyages (grammarian) =

Ancient Greek grammarian

Astyages (Ancient Greek: Ἀστυάγης) was a man of ancient Greece who was a grammarian who wrote a commentary on the poet Callimachus as well as some other treatises on grammatical subjects. We also find some mention of him in the scholia on Dionysius Thrax, derived from George Choiroboskos, which describes a work he wrote on the grammatical cases in Greek.

His time is unknown. We know only that he lived after the time of Callimachus (that is, the 3rd century BCE) and before the compilation of the Suda (that is, the 10th century CE), which is the earliest, and primary, source of information on this writer. Some scholars have surmised that he lived somewhere around the 1st or 2nd century CE based on his scholarly concerns with Hellenistic literature.

== Works ==
- A Note on Callimachus the Poet (Εἰς Καλλίμαχου τὸν ποιητὴν ὑπόμνημα)
- Manual on Grammar (Τέχνη γραμματική)
- On Dialects (Περὶ διαλέκτων)
- On Versification (Περὶ μέτρων)
- Rules of Nominal Inflection (Κανόνες ὀνοματικοί)
