= Karl Wilhelm Göttling =

German classical philologist (1793–1869)

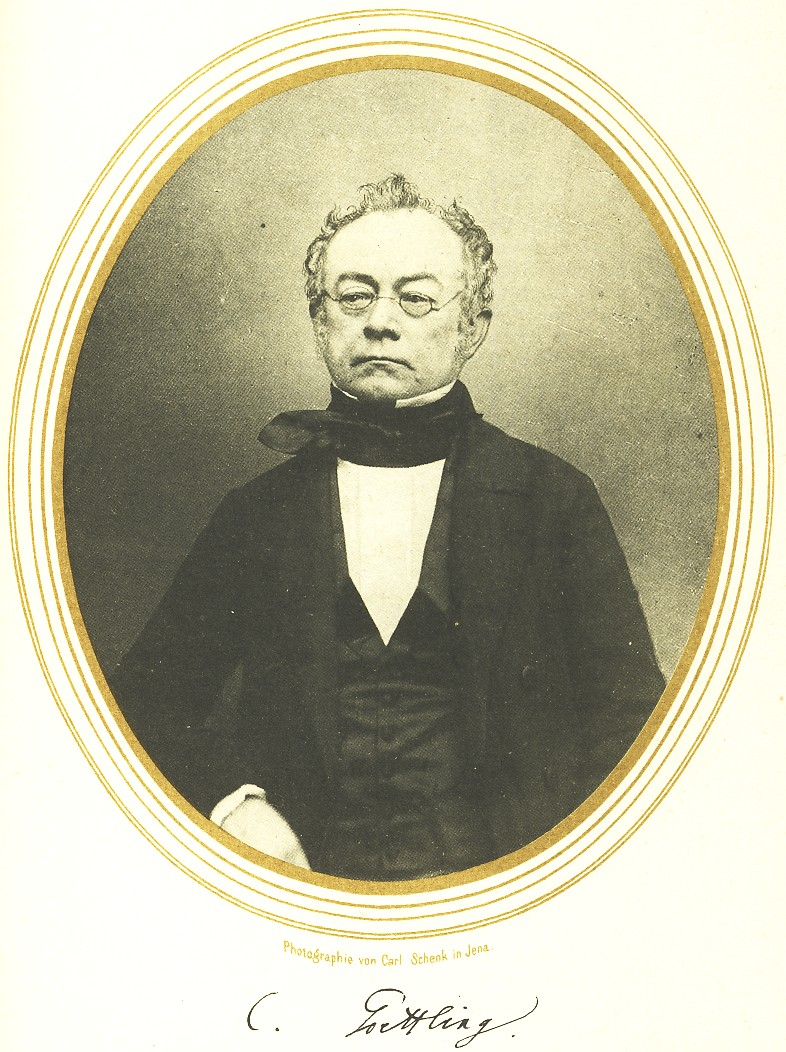
Karl Wilhelm Göttling.

Karl Wilhelm Göttling (Latin: Carolus Guilielmus Goettling; January 19, 1793 – January 20, 1869) was a German philologist and classical scholar.

== Biography ==
He was born in Jena, the son of chemist Johann Friedrich August Göttling (1753–1820). He attended the Wilhelm-Ernst-Gymnasium in Weimar, and then, beginning in 1811, studied philology at the universities of Jena and Berlin. He volunteered in the war against France in 1814, and after the peace continued his studies at Berlin under Friedrich August Wolf, August Boeckh and Philipp Buttmann.

From 1816, he taught classes at the gymnasium in Rudolstadt. In 1819 he became director of the Neuwied gymnasium, and in 1822 was appointed associate professor of philology at the University of Jena. At Jena he was also director of the philological seminary (from 1826) and university librarian, and in 1831 attained the title of full professor. He continued to reside in his home town till his death. During his academic career he participated in several study trips to Italy, Sicily, Greece, et al., and in 1852 accompanied Ludwig Preller (1809–1861) and Hermann Theodor Hettner (1821–1882) on a journey to Greece and Constantinople. He died in Jena, aged 75.

== Work ==
In his early years Göttling devoted himself to German literature, and published two works on the Nibelungen: Über des Geschichtliche im Nibelungenliede (1814) and Nibelungen und Gibelinen (1817). The greater part of his life, however, was devoted to the study of classical literature, especially the elucidation of Greek authors. The contents of his Gesammelte Abhandlungen aus dem klassischen Altertum ("Collected treatises on classical antiquity," 2 vols., 1851–1863) and Opuscula Academica ("Brief academic works," published in 1869 after his death) sufficiently indicate the varied nature of his studies.

Among his more important writings were editions of the Techne (grammatical manual) of Theodosius of Alexandria (Theodosii Alexandrini grammatica, 1822), Aristotle's Politics (1824), and Economics (1830), as well as editions of the poet Hesiod (1831; 3rd ed. by J. Flach, 1878). In the field of Greek grammar he published Allgemeine Lehre vom Akzent der griechischen Sprache (Jena 1835), enlarged from a smaller work, which was translated into English (1831) as the Elements of Greek Accentuation. His smaller works were for the most part combined in Gesammelte Abhandlungen aus dem klassischen Altertum and Opuscula Academica (1869). Mention may also be made of his Correspondence with Goethe (published 1880 by Kuno Fischer).
