= Etymologicum Magnum =

Medieval Greek Encyclopedia

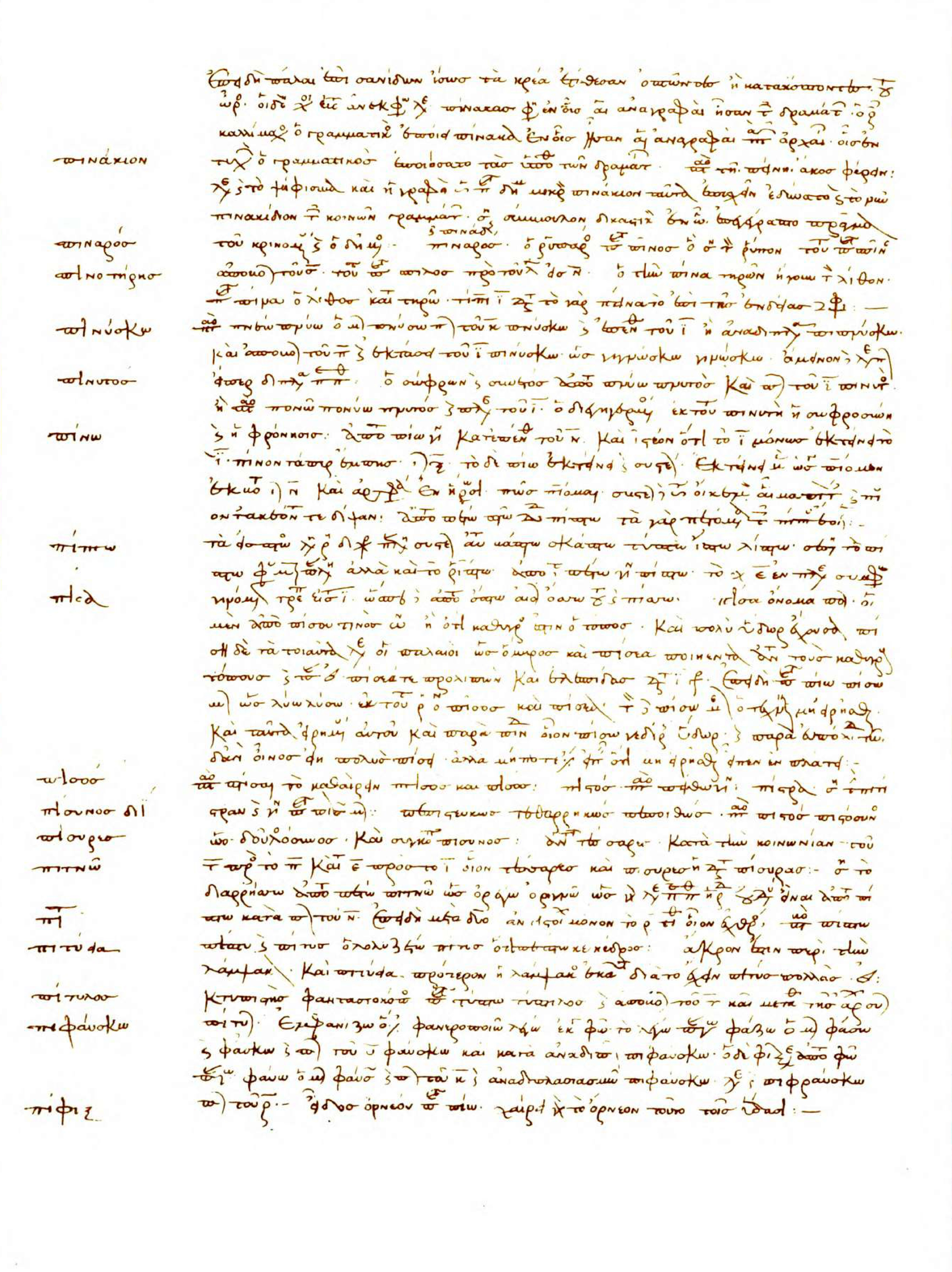
Page from a 14th-century MS that Gaisford used for his 1848 edition.

Etymologicum Magnum (Ancient Greek: Ἐτυμολογικὸν Μέγα, transl. Ἐtymologikὸn Méga) (standard abbreviation EM, or Etym. M. in older literature) is the traditional title of a Greek lexical encyclopedia compiled at Constantinople by an unknown lexicographer around 1150 AD. It is the largest Byzantine lexicon and draws on many earlier grammatical, lexical and rhetorical works. Its main sources were two previous etymologica, the so-called Etymologicum Genuinum and the Etymologicum Gudianum. Other sources include Stephanus of Byzantium, the Epitome of Diogenianus, the so-called Lexicon Αἱμωδεῖν (Haimōdeῖn), Eulogius’ Ἀπορίαι καὶ λύσεις (Ἀporίai kaὶ lύseis), George Choeroboscus’ Epimerismi ad Psalmos, the Etymologicon of Orion of Thebes, and collections of scholia. The compiler of the Etymologicum Magnum was not a mere copyist; rather he amalgamated, reorganised, augmented and freely modified his source material to create a new and individual work.

The editio princeps of the Etymologicum Magnum was published by Zacharias Kallierges and Nikolaos Vlastos under the patronage of Anna Notaras at Venice in 1499. The typeface was designed and cut by Kallierges, modeled on his own handwriting. The decorative initial letters and headpieces are patterned on the decorations of the Byzantine manuscript tradition, and the woodcut borders incorporate elaborate arabesque designs, usually colored white on red, but also white on gold. The decorations of the Kallierges edition had a great influence in printing, especially on Greek liturgical books.

The most recent complete edition is by Thomas Gaisford (Oxford 1848), with the slightly different title of Etymologicon Magnum. A new (uncompleted) edition is in preparation by F. Lasserre and N. Livadaras (under the title Etymologicum Magnum Auctum).

== Bibliography ==
- K. Alpers (1990), ‘Griechische Lexikographie in Antike und Mittelalter. Dargestellt an ausgewählten Beispielen’ in H.-A. Koch and A. Krup-Ebert (eds.), Welt der Information. Wissen und Wissensvermittlung in Geschichte und Gegenwart (Stuttgart) 14–38.
- K. Alpers (2001), ‘Lexikographie (B.I-III)’ in G. Üding and W. Jens (eds.), Historisches Wörterbuch der Rhetorik 5 (Tübingen) 194–210.
- P. Rance, (2007), ‘The Etymologicum Magnum and the “Fragment of Urbicius”’, Greek, Roman and Byzantine Studies 47:193-224 (online)
- R. Reitzenstein (1897), Geschichte der griechischen Etymologika: ein Beitrag zur Geschichte der Philologie in Alexandria und Byzanz (Leipzig; repr. Amsterdam 1964).
- F. W. Sturz (1820), Orionis Thebani Etymologicon (Leipzig).
