= Hermogenes =

Origin
- Origin: Greek

Other names
- Related names: Diogenes

Hermogenes is a Greek name (Ἑρμογένης), meaning "born of Hermes". It may refer to:

- Hermogenes (potter) (fl. c. 550 BC), Attic Greek potter
- Hermogenes (philosopher) (fl. c. 400 BC), Greek philosopher
- Hermogenes of Priene (fl. c. 200 BC), Greek architect
- Hermogenes (fl. c. 64), in 2 Timothy 1, a former Christian who turned away from Saint Paul in Asia
- Hermagoras of Aquileia (also called Hermogenes, died c. 305) Christian bishop
- Hermogenes, magician in The Golden Legend
- Hermogenes of Tarsus (fl. late 2nd century), Roman-era rhetorician and historian
- Hermogenes (heretic leader), late 2nd century founder of religious heresy.
- Hermogenes (4th cent.), son of Hermogenes, Christian priest of Caesarea (Cappadocia), predecessor of Dianius, and scribe/author of the Nicene Creed (Bas. ep. 81.244.9, 263.3)
- Hermogenes (magister officiorum), (fl. 530s), Byzantine official and military leader
- Patriarch Hermogenes (died 1612), Russian religious leader
- Hermogenes, Bishop of Tobolsk and Siberia (1858–1918), Russian religious leader
- Hermógenes Fonseca (born 1908), Brazilian footballer
- Hermógenes L. Mora (born 1979), Nicaraguan poet
