= Theodosius of Alexandria (grammarian) =

Ancient Greek grammarian

Theodosius of Alexandria was an Ancient Greek grammarian, purported to have lived about the time of Constantine the Great. A terminus ante quem is yielded by a letter of Synesius (floruit ca. 400 CE) to the "wonderful grammarian Theodosius". Theodosius himself cited Apollonius Dyscolus and Herodian in his works.

Theodosius' main work were the Κανόνες εἰσαγωγικοί περὶ κλίσεως ὀνομάτων καὶ ῤημάτων (Introduction to The Rules of Noun and Verb Declension), essentially an epitome of Dionysius Thrax's Art of Grammar, from where he mechanically copied the verb and noun inflectional paradigms. This work, and most importantly the scholia on it by Georgius Choeroboscus, constituted the main primary source for the grammarians later onwards down to the Renaissance. Theodosius was also known as the author of Περὶ ὅρου and other grammatical works.

The Κανόνες, amplified by the additions of later Byzantine grammarians, were published by Karl Wilhelm Göttling under the title of Theodosii Alexandrini Grammatica (Leipzig, 1822), the Preface having been published before in Osann's Philemonis grammatici quae supersunt (Berlin, 1821), and a portion of this work, entitled Theodosii Grammatici Alex. Canones de Declinatione Nominum et Conjugatione Verborum, was included by August Immanuel Bekker in the third volume of his Anecdota Graeca (Vol. 3, Berlin, 1821).
