= Ode to Aphrodite =

Greek lyric poem by Sappho

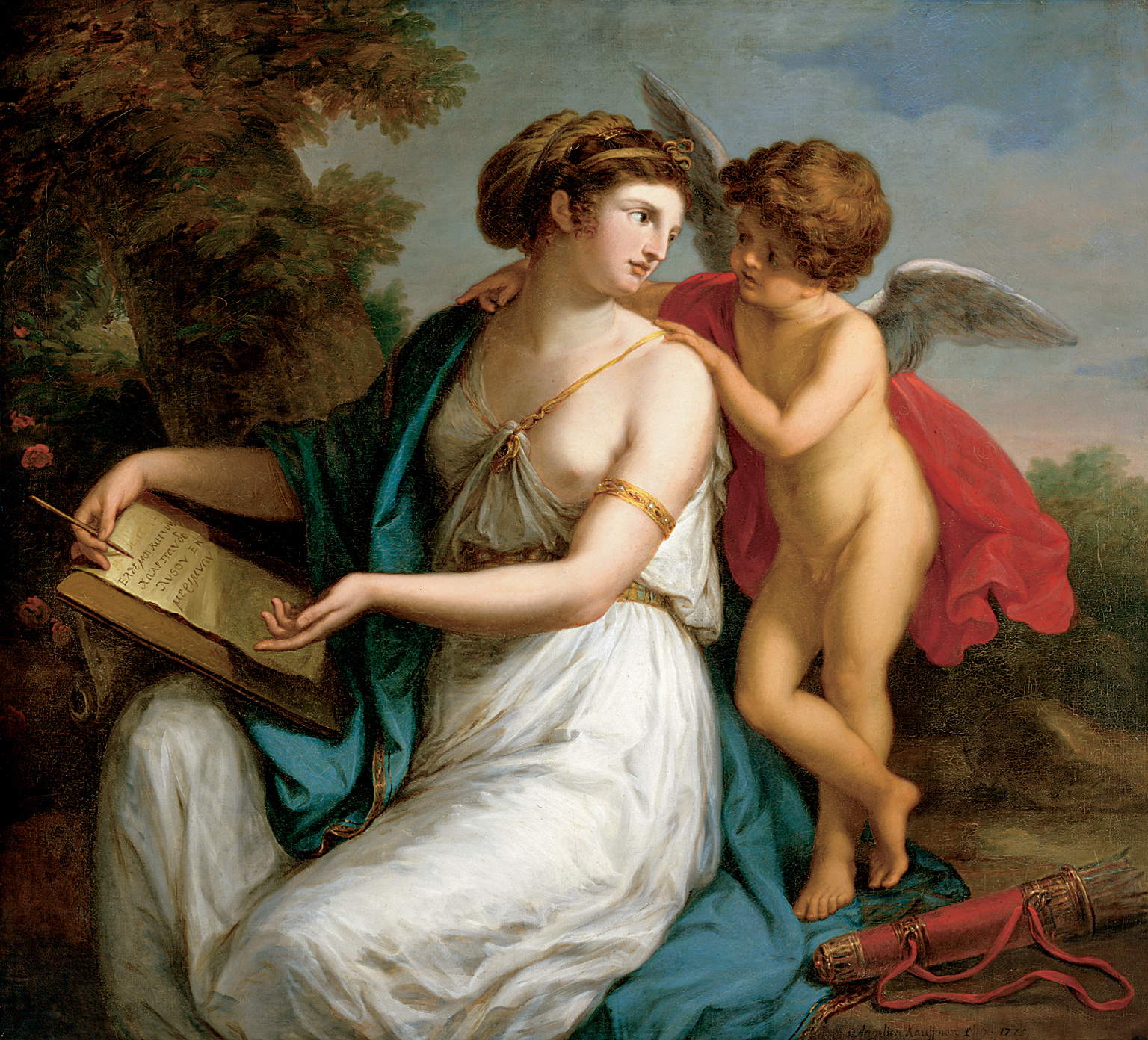
Sappho Inspired by Love, 1775, Angelica Kauffmann. The text Sappho is writing in this painting comes from lines 25–26 of the Ode to Aphrodite.

The Ode to Aphrodite (or Sappho fragment 1 (Note: Though there are several different systems for numbering the surviving fragments of Sappho's poetry, the Ode to Aphrodite is fragment 1 in all major editions. In this article, the numbering used throughout is from Eva-Maria Voigt's 1971 edition of Sappho and Alcaeus.)) is a lyric poem by the archaic Greek poet Sappho, who wrote in the late seventh and early sixth centuries BCE, in which the speaker calls on the help of Aphrodite in the pursuit of a beloved. The poem survives in almost complete form, with only two places of uncertainty in the text, preserved through a quotation from Dionysius of Halicarnassus' treatise On Composition and in fragmentary form in a scrap of papyrus discovered at Oxyrhynchus in Egypt.

The Ode to Aphrodite comprises seven Sapphic stanzas. It begins with an invocation of the goddess Aphrodite, which is followed by a narrative section in which the speaker describes a previous occasion on which the goddess has helped her. The poem ends with an appeal to Aphrodite to once again come to the speaker's aid. The seriousness with which Sappho intended the poem is disputed, though at least parts of the work appear to be intentionally humorous. The poem makes use of Homeric language, and alludes to episodes from the Iliad.

== Preservation ==
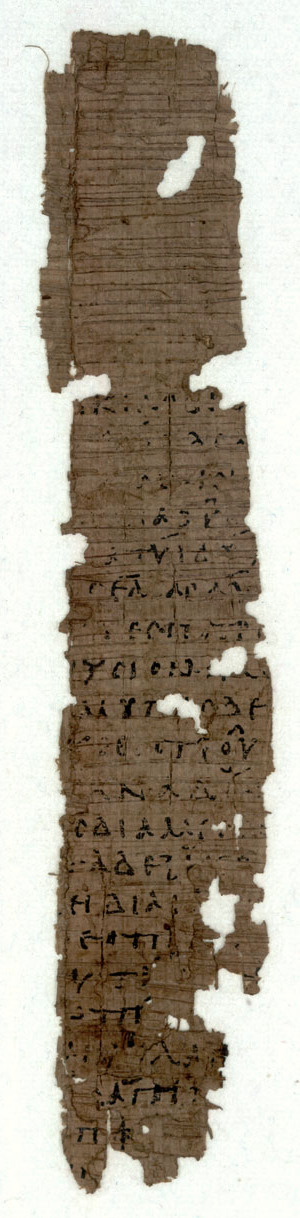
Papyrus Oxyrhynchus 2288

The Ode to Aphrodite survived from antiquity. It was preserved in Dionysius of Halicarnassus' On Composition, quoted in its entirety as an example of "smooth" or "polished" writing, a style which Dionysius also identifies in the work of Hesiod, Anacreon, and Euripides. It is also partially preserved on Papyrus Oxyrhynchus 2288, a second-century papyrus discovered at Oxyrhynchus in Egypt.

Though the poem is conventionally considered to be completely preserved, there are two places where the reading is uncertain. The first is the initial word of the poem: some manuscripts of Dionysius render the word as "Ποικιλόφρον’"; others, along with the Oxyrhynchus papyrus of the poem, have "Ποικιλόθρον’". Both words are compounds of the adjective ποικιλος (literally 'many-coloured'; metaphorically 'diverse', 'complex', 'subtle'); –θρον means 'chair', and –φρον 'mind'. Accordingly, the competing readings are on the order of "[Aphrodite] of the many-coloured throne" or "[Aphrodite] of the subtle/complex mind."

Ποικιλόθρον’ is the standard reading, and both the Lobel–Page and Voigt editions of Sappho print it. Hutchinson argues that it is more likely that "–θρον" was corrupted to "–φρον" than vice versa. However, Anne Carson's edition of Sappho argues for Ποικιλόφρον’, and more recently Rayor and Lardinois, while following Voigt's text, note that "it is hard to decide between these two readings". Another possible understanding of the word ποικιλόθρον’ takes the second component in the compound to be derived from θρόνον, a Homeric word used to refer to flowers embroidered on cloth. While apparently a less common understanding, it has been employed in translations dating back to the 19th century; more recently, for example, a translation by Gregory Nagy adopted this reading and rendered the vocative phrase as "you with pattern-woven flowers".

The second problem in the poem's preservation is at line 19, where the manuscripts of the poem are "garbled", and the papyrus is broken at the beginning of the line.

== Poem ==
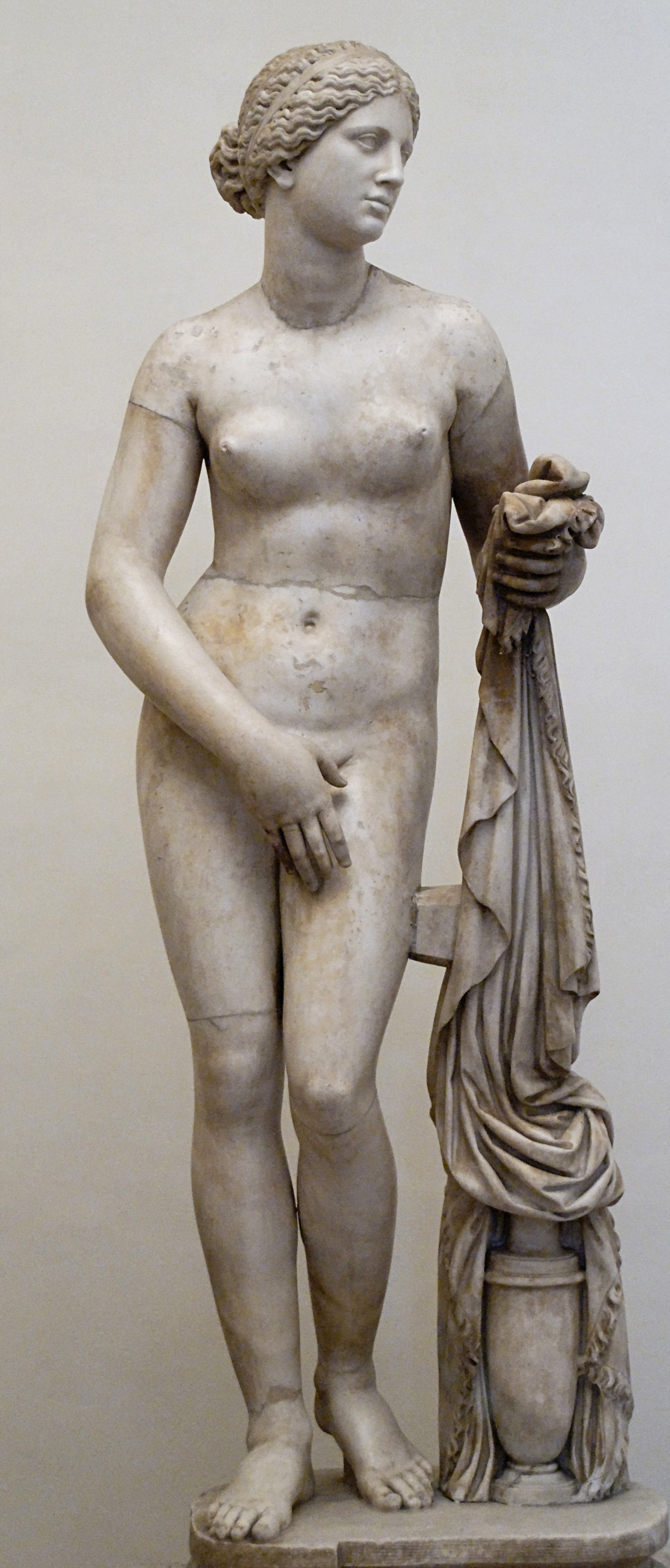
Aphrodite, the subject of Sappho's poem. This marble sculpture is a Roman copy of Praxiteles's Aphrodite of Knidos.

The poem is written in Aeolic Greek and set in Sapphic stanzas, a meter named after Sappho, in which three longer lines of the same length are followed by a fourth, shorter one. In Hellenistic editions of Sappho's works, it was the first poem of Book I of her poetry. (Note: Hephaistion uses the Ode to Aphrodite to illustrate the Sapphic stanza in his Enchiridion de Metris; this is generally thought to be because it was the first poem in Book I of the Alexandrian edition of her poetry, which contained only poems in Sapphics.) As the poem begins with the word "Ποικιλόθρον'", this is outside of the sequence followed through the rest of Book I, where the poems are ordered alphabetically by initial letter. At seven stanzas long, the poem is the longest-surviving fragment from Book I of Sappho.

The ode is written in the form of a prayer to Aphrodite, goddess of love, from a speaker who longs for the attentions of an unnamed woman. Its structure follows the three-part structure of ancient Greek hymns, beginning with an invocation, followed by a narrative section, and culminating in a request to the god. The speaker is identified in the poem as Sappho, in one of only four surviving works where Sappho names herself. The sex of Sappho's beloved is established from only a single word, the feminine εθελοισα in line 24. This reading, now standard, was first proposed in 1835 by Theodor Bergk, but not fully accepted until the 1960s. As late as 1955 Edgar Lobel and Denys Page's edition of Sappho noted that the authors accepted this reading "without the least confidence in it".

Sappho asks the goddess to ease the pains of her unrequited love for this woman; after being thus invoked, Aphrodite appears to Sappho, telling her that the woman who has rejected her advances will in time pursue her in turn. The poem concludes with another call for the goddess to assist the speaker in all her amorous struggles. With its reference to a female beloved, the "Ode to Aphrodite" is (along with Sappho 31) one of the few extant works of Sappho that provides evidence that she loved other women. (Note: The only fragment of Sappho to explicitly refer to female homosexual activity is Sappho 94.) The poem contains few clues to the performance context, though Stefano Caciagli suggests that it may have been written for an audience of Sappho's female friends.

The Ode to Aphrodite is strongly influenced by Homeric epic. Ruby Blondell argues that the whole poem is a parody and reworking of the scene in book five of the Iliad between Aphrodite, Athena, and Diomedes. Sappho's Homeric influence is especially clear in the third stanza of the poem, where Aphrodite's descent to the mortal world is marked by what Keith Stanley describes as "a virtual invasion of Homeric words and phrases".

Classicists disagree about whether the poem was intended as a serious piece. Arguing for a serious interpretation of the poem, for instance, C. M. Bowra suggests that it discusses a genuine religious experience. On the other hand, A. P. Burnett sees the piece as "not a prayer at all", but a lighthearted one aiming to amuse. Some elements of the poem which are otherwise difficult to account for can be explained as humorous. For instance, at the beginning of the third stanza of the poem, Sappho calls upon Aphrodite in a chariot "yoked with lovely sparrows", a phrase which Harold Zellner argues is most easily explicable as a form of humorous wordplay. Aphrodite's speech in the fourth and fifth stanzas of the poem has also been interpreted as lighthearted. Keith Stanley argues that these lines portray Aphrodite "humorous[ly] chiding" Sappho, with the threefold repetition of δηυτε followed by the hyperbolic and lightly mocking τίς σ', ὦ Ψάπφ', ἀδικήει; (Note: Stanley translates Aphrodite's speech as "What ails you this time? ... Why have you summoned me this time? [...] Whom must I reconcile with you this time? ... Who, O Sappho, is doing you this dreadful injustice?" [emphasis original])
