= Himerius =

Greek sophist (c. 315 – c. 386)

Himerius (Ancient Greek: Ἱμέριος; c. 315 – c. 386) was a Greek sophist and rhetorician. 24 of his orations have reached us complete, and fragments of 12 others survive.

== Life and works ==
Himerius was born at Prusias ad Hypium in Bithynia. He completed his education at Athens, whence he was summoned to Constantinople in 362 by the emperor Julian, possibly to act as his private secretary. After the death of Julian in the following year Himerius returned to Athens, where he established a school of rhetoric, which he compared with that of Isocrates and the Delphic oracle, owing to the number of those who flocked from all parts of the world to hear him. Amongst his pupils were Gregory of Nazianzus and Basil the Great, bishop of Caesarea.

In recognition of his merits, civic rights and the membership of the Areopagus were conferred upon him. The death of his son Rufinus (his lament for whom, called the Μονῳδία, is extant) and that of a favourite daughter greatly affected his health; in his later years he became blind and he died of epilepsy. In his lament for Rufinus he identifies himself as a descendant of Plutarch and Sextus of Chaeronea.

Although a pagan, who had been initiated into the mysteries of Mithras by Julian, his works show no attacks against the Christians.

Himerius is a typical representative of the later rhetorical schools. Photius (cod. 165, 243 Bekker) had read 71 speeches by him, of 36 of which he has given an epitome; 24 have come down to us complete and fragments of 12 others. They consist of epideictic or "display" speeches after the style of Aristides, the majority of them having been delivered on special occasions, such as the arrival of a new governor, visits to different cities (Thessalonica, Constantinople), or the death of friends or well-known personages.

The Polemarchicus, like the Menexenus of Plato and the Epitaphios Logos of Hypereides, is a panegyric of those who had given their lives for their country; it is so called because it was originally the duty of the polemarch to arrange the funeral games in honour of those who had fallen in battle. Other declamations, only known from the excerpts in Photius, were imaginary orations put into the mouth of famous persons--Demosthenes advocating the recall of Aeschines from banishment, Hypereides supporting the policy of Demosthenes, Themistocles inveighing against the king of Persia, an orator unnamed attacking the philosopher Epicurus for denying the doctrine of divine providence before a court in Athens.

Himerius is more of a poet than a rhetorician, and his declamations are valuable as giving prose versions or even the actual words of lost poems by Greek lyric writers. The prose poem on the marriage of his pupil Severus and his greeting to Basil at the beginning of spring are quite in the spirit of the old lyric. Himerius possesses vigour of language and descriptive powers, though his productions are spoilt by too frequent use of imagery, allegorical and metaphorical obscurities, mannerism and ostentatious learning. But they are valuable for the history and social conditions of the time, although lacking the sincerity characteristic of Libanius.
