= Maximus of Tyre =

2nd century Greek rhetorician and philosopher

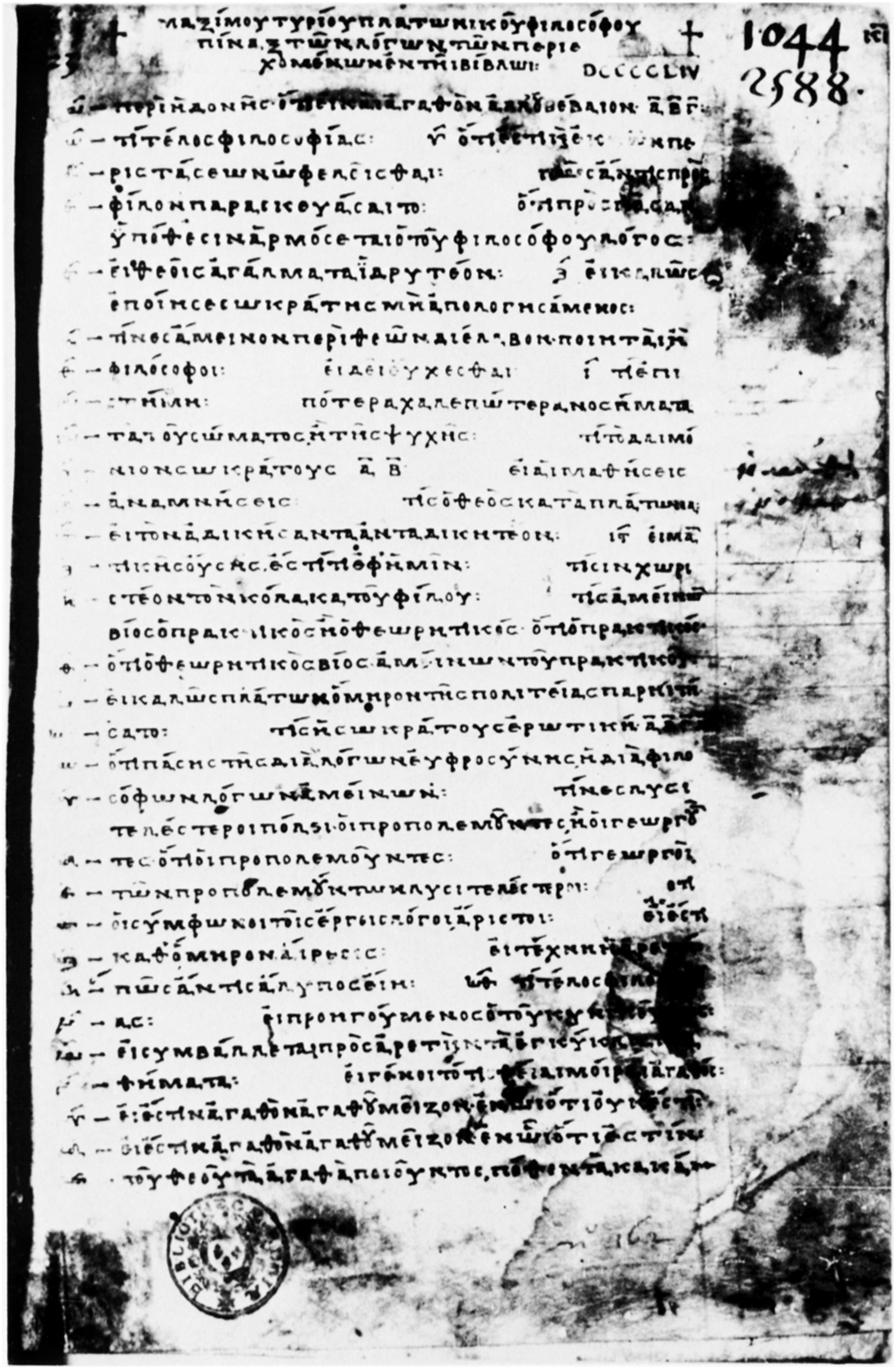

Maximus of Tyre (Greek: Μάξιμος Τύριος; fl. late 2nd century AD), also known as Cassius Maximus Tyrius, was a Greek rhetorician and philosopher who lived in the time of the Antonines and Commodus, and who belongs to the trend of the Second Sophistic. His writings contain many allusions to the history of Greece, while there is little reference to Rome; hence it is inferred that he lived longer in Greece, perhaps as a professor at Athens. Although nominally a Platonist, he is really a sophist rather than a philosopher, although he is still considered one of the precursors of Neoplatonism.

== Writings ==
=== The Dissertations ===
There exist 41 essays or discourses on theological, ethical, and other philosophical subjects, collected into a work called The Dissertations. The central theme is God as the supreme being, one and indivisible though called by many names, accessible to reason alone:

In such a mighty contest, sedition and discord, you will see one according law and assertion in all the earth, that there is one God, the king and father of all things, and many gods, sons of God, ruling together with him.

As animals form the intermediate stage between plants and human beings, so there exist intermediaries between God and man, viz. daemons, who dwell on the confines of heaven and earth. The soul in many ways bears a great resemblance to the divinity; it is partly mortal, partly immortal, and, when freed from the fetters of the body, becomes a daemon. Life is the sleep of the soul, from which it awakes at death. The style of Maximus is superior to that of the ordinary sophistical rhetorician, but scholars differ widely as to the merits of the essays themselves.

Dissertation XX discusses "Whether the Life of a Cynic is to Be Preferred". He begins with a narrative of how Prometheus created mankind, who initially lived a life of ease "for the earth supplied them with aliment, rich meadows, long-haired mountains, and abundance of fruits" – in other words, a Garden of Eden that resonates with Cynic ideas. It was "a life without war, without iron, without a guard, peaceful, healthful unindigent".

Then, taking perhaps from Lucretius, he contrasts that Garden to mankind's "second life", which started with the division of the earth into property, which they then enclosed into fortifications and walls, and started to wear jewellery and gold, built houses, “molested the earth by digging into it for metals”, and invaded the sea and the air (killing animals, fish and birds), in what he described as a “slaughter and all-various gore, pursuing gratification of the body”. Humans became unhappy and, to compensate, sought wealth, “fearing poverty...dreading death...neglecting the care of life...They blamed base actions but did not abstain from them and “they hated to live, but dreaded to die”.

He then contrasts the two lives – that of the original Garden and of the “second life” he has just described and asks, which man would not choose the first, who “knows that by the change he shall be liberated from a multitude of evils” and what he calls “a dreadful prison of unhappy men, confined to a dreadful prison of unhappy men, confined in a dark recess, with large iron fetters round their feet, a great weight about their neck…passing their time in filth, in torment, and in weeping”. He asks, “Which of these images shall we proclaim blessed”?

He goes on to praise Diogenes of Sinope, the Cynic, for choosing his ascetic life, but only because he avoided the often fearful fates of other philosophers – such as Socrates being condemned. But there is no mention of his taking up the ascetic life; rather he only talks about how the Garden would be preferable to the life mankind has made for itself. So it is unlikely he was a Cynic, but was just envious of that idealised pre-civilisation Life in the Garden.

Maximus of Tyre must be distinguished from the Stoic Claudius Maximus, tutor of Marcus Aurelius.

== Ancient Greek Text ==
- Maximus Tyrius, Philosophumena, Dialexeis - Edited by George Leonidas Koniaris, Publisher Walter de Gruyter, 1995, DOI: https://doi.org/10.1515/9783110882568 - this critical edition presents the Ancient Greek text of Maximus of Tyre.

== Translations ==
- Taylor, Thomas, The Dissertations of Maximus Tyrius. C. Wittingham (1804)
- Trapp, Michael. Maximus of Tyre: The Philosophical Orations, (NY: Oxford University Press, 1997)
- William H. Race. Maximus of Tyre: Philosophical Orations (Loeb Classical Library, 2 vols., 2023)

== Bibliography ==
- F. Fauquier/B. Pérez-Jean (sous la dir.), Maxime de Tyr, entre rhétorique et philosophie au II^{e} siècle de notre ère, Montpellier, Presses Universitaires de la Méditerranée, 2016. ISBN 978-2-36781-214-4
- P. Daouti, Homère et Platon chez Maxime de Tyr, Thèse, Université Paul Valéry – Montpellier III et Université Capodistria d' Athènes, Montpellier, 2015, http://www.biu-montpellier.fr/florabium/jsp/nnt.jsp?nnt=2015MON30042.
