= Marius Plotius Sacerdos =

3rd-century Roman grammarian

Marius Plotius Sacerdos was a Roman grammarian who flourished towards the end of the third century CE. He wrote an ars grammatica in three books, the third of which treats of meter.
