= Orion of Thebes =

Orion of Thebes (Greek: Ώρίων ό Θηβαίος, died c. 460s) was a 5th-century Egyptian grammarian of Thebes (Egypt). He was the teacher of Proclus the neo-Platonist, and of Aelia Eudocia, the wife of Emperor Theodosius II. He taught at Alexandria, Caesarea in Cappadocia and Constantinople. He was the author of a partly extant etymological Lexicon (ed. F. W. Sturz, 1820), largely used by the compilers of the Etymologicum Magnum, the Etymologicum Gudianum and other similar works; a collection of maxims in three books, addressed to Eudocia, also ascribed to him by the Suda, still exists in a Warsaw manuscript.

== Edition ==
- Antholognomici Friedrich Wilhelm Schneidewin (ed.), Coniectanea critica: insunt Orionis Thebani Antholognomici Tituli VIII, Göttingen (1839)
