= George Choiroboskos =

Early 9th-century Byzantine grammarian and deacon

George Choiroboskos (Greek: Γεώργιος Χοιροβοσκός), Latinized as Georgius Choeroboscus, was an early 9th-century Byzantine grammarian and deacon.

== Life ==
Little is known about his life. He held the positions of deacon and chartophylax (keeper of archives) at the Patriarchate of Constantinople, and is also referred in some of his works, known as oikoumenikos didaskalos (οἰκουμενικὸς διδάσκαλος), i.e. as one of the three teachers at the Patriarchal School of the Hagia Sophia. Earlier scholars used to date him in the 6th century, but he is now placed in the early 9th century, during the second period of Byzantine Iconoclasm (c. 815–843) or shortly after it. This would also explain his pejorative sobriquet (choiroboskos, i.e. "swineherd") as well as the only fragmentary survival of his works, as he may have been an adherent of Iconoclasm. His reputation was certainly blackened, so that the 12th-century bishop and scholar Eustathius of Thessalonica, who quotes frequently from his works, fulminates against those who gave the "wise teacher" this nickname out of envy, and thereby condemned him to oblivion. Indeed, many of his works were later attributed to iconophile authors.

== Works ==
George Choiroboskos wrote a number of works on grammar, which have often survived only in fragments, as well as in the notes of his pupils.

He wrote a commentary on the canons of Theodosius of Alexandria on declension and conjugation, which survives complete; commentaries on the works of Apollonius Dyscolus, Herodian, Hephaestion of Alexandria and Dionysius Thrax, which survive in fragments; a treatise on orthography, also fragmentary; a set of epimerisms, grammatical analyses of the Psalms, which were used in Byzantine schools; and a treatise on poetry, later translated into Old Slavonic and included in Sviatoslav II's Izbornik.

According to Robert Browning in the Oxford Dictionary of Byzantium, "the dry and detailed treatises of Choiroboskos played a major part in transmitting ancient grammatical doctrine to the Byzantine world", and were later mined by Renaissance scholars like Constantine Lascaris and Urban of Belluno for information on literary Greek.

== Editions ==
- Georgii Choerobosci diaconi et oecumenici magistri Prolegomena et scholia in Theodosii Alexandrini Canones isagogicos de flexione nominum, subscriptis discrepantiis scripturae codicum, ed. Alfredus Hilgard in Grammatici Graeci partis quartae volumen prius (IV.1), Lipsiae 1889, pp. 103–417. The previous edition was by Thomas Gaisford in 1842: Georgii Choerobosci Dictata in Theodosii Canones necnon Epimerismi in Psalmos, e codicibus manuscriptis edidit Thomas Gaisford, Aedis Christi Decanus necnon Graecae Linguae Professor Regius, Oxonii (e typographeo academico) 1842 (3 vols: vol. 1, pp. 1–396). Before Gaisford, Immanuel Bekker had edited only the section dealing with the accent of the cases: Anecdota Graeca vol. III (1821), pp. 1209–70.
