= Apollonius Dyscolus =

2nd-century Greek grammarian

- Born: 2nd century Alexandria
- Died: 2nd century
- Occupation: Grammarian
- Parent: Mnesitheus of Alexandria (father)

Apollonius Dyscolus (Greek: Ἀπολλώνιος ὁ Δύσκολος; reached his maturity sometime around 130 CE) is considered one of the greatest of the Greek grammarians.

== Life ==
Little is known of Apollonius Dyscolus, other than that he was born at Alexandria, son of Mnesitheus. The precise dates for his life are not known. His son Aelius Herodianus, who wrote on phonology, appears to have moved to Rome at the time of Marcus Aurelius. From this it is inferred that his father must have been a contemporary of Hadrian, and may have spent a short period in Rome during the reign of Antoninus Pius. One tradition holds that he was so poor that he could not afford papyri to write on, and was constrained to avail himself of potsherds to write down his thoughts. His monicker ho dúskolos signifying "the difficult" or "crabby/grouchy" may reflect the sour temper of someone reduced to eking out a living in extreme indigence. Various interpretations have been advanced arguing the nickname was expressive of his highly compressed, difficult style, or as illustrating his cantankerously disputatious manner, or as alluding to his habit of citing arcane words in contests with other grammarians, in order to perplex them. He died in poverty in what was formerly the royal quarter of the city of Alexandria.

== Works ==
He was the founder of scientific syntax, and is styled by Priscian maximus auctor artis grammaticae ('the greatest authority on the science of grammar'), and grammaticorum princeps ('prince of grammarians'). He wrote extensively on the parts of speech. Of the twenty books named in the Suda, four are extant: on syntax, and three smaller treatises: on adverbs, on conjunctions, and on pronouns. One characteristic which was to influence later generations was Apollonius' deployment of philosophical concepts in grammatical analysis. The earlier Alexandrine grammatical tradition was familiar with distinctions such as that between genos and eidos, but these were not used in refining distinctions between the parts of speech. Apollonius drew on Stoic ontology to analyse the noun and the verb.

Like his son, Aelius Herodianus, he had an enormous influence on all later grammarians.

== Sources ==
- Householder, Fred Walter (1981). The Syntax of Apollonius Dyscolus. John Benjamins Publishing. ISBN 978-9-027-24504-5.
- Ildefonse, Frédérique (1997). La Naissance de la Grammaire dans l'Antiquité grecque. Paris: Vrin. pp. 253–445. ISBN 2-7116-1311-9.
- Janse, Mark (2002). "Alexandrian grammatical theory in practice: Apollonius Dyscolus and the personal pronouns". Grammatical Theory and Philosophy of Language. Leuven University Press. pp. 233–255.
- Lallot, Jean (1997a). Apollonius Dyscole: De la construction: Introduction, texte et traduction. Vol. 1. Paris: CNRS Éditions. ISBN 978-2-711-61321-2.
- Lallot, Jean (1997b). Apollonius Dyscole: De la construction: Notes et index. Vol. 2. Paris: CNRS Éditions. ISBN 978-2-711-61321-2.
- Luhtala, Anneli (2005). Grammar and Philosophy in Late Antiquity: A Study of Priscian's Sources. John Benjamins Publishing. ISBN 978-9-027-24598-4.
- Mandilarás, Vassileios (1973). The Verb in the Greek Non-literary Papyri. Athens: Hellenic Ministry of Culture and Scienbces.
- Robins, Robert H. (2011) [First published 1993]. The Byzantine Grammarians: Their Place in History. Walter de Gruyter. ISBN 978-3-110-85722-1.
- Sandys, John Edwin (2010) [First published 1903]. A History of Classical Scholarship: From the End of the Sixth Century B.C. to the End of the Middle Ages. Cambridge University Press. ISBN 978-1-108-02706-9.
- Schneider, Richard (1878). Apollonii Scripta minora. Teubner.
