= Hephaestion (grammarian) =

2nd century scholar from Alexandria

Hephaestion (Ancient Greek: Ἡφαιστίων Hēphaistíōn; fl. 2nd century AD) was a grammarian of Alexandria who flourished in the age of the Antonines. He was the author of a manual (abridged from a larger work in 48 books) of Greek metres, which is most valuable as the only complete treatise on the subject that has been preserved. The concluding chapter discusses the various kinds of poetical composition. It is written in a clear and simple style, and was much used as a school-book.

== Works ==
- Enchiridion de Metris (Ἐγχειρίδιον περὶ μέτρων)
- On Confusions in Poems (Περὶ τῶν ἐν ποιήμασι ταραχῶν)
- Poemata (Περὶ ποιημάτων)
- Solutions in Tragedy (Τραγικῶν λύσεων)
- Solutions to Difficulties in Comedy (Κωμικῶν ἀπορημάτων λύσεις)

== Editions ==
- Thomas Foster Barham: The Enkheiridion of Hehfaistiown concerning Metres and Poems. Translated into English, and illustrated by Notes and a rythmical [sic] Notation. Cambridge, 1843 (book at archive.org)
- Scriptores metrici graeci edidit R. Westphal. Vol. I. Hephaestionis de metris enchiridion et de poemata libellus cum scholiis et trichae epitomis, adjecta procli chrestomathia grammatica. Leipzig (Lipsia), 1866 (MDCCCLXVI) (book at books.google)
- Also editions by T. Gaisford (1855, with the valuable scholia) and M. Consbruch (1906); translation with commentary by J. M. van Ophuijsen (1987); see also Wilhelm von Christ, Geschichte der griechischen Litteratur (1898); M. Consbruch, De veterum... (1890); J. E. Sandys, Hist. Class. Schol. i. (1906).
