= Erinna =

Ancient Greek female poet

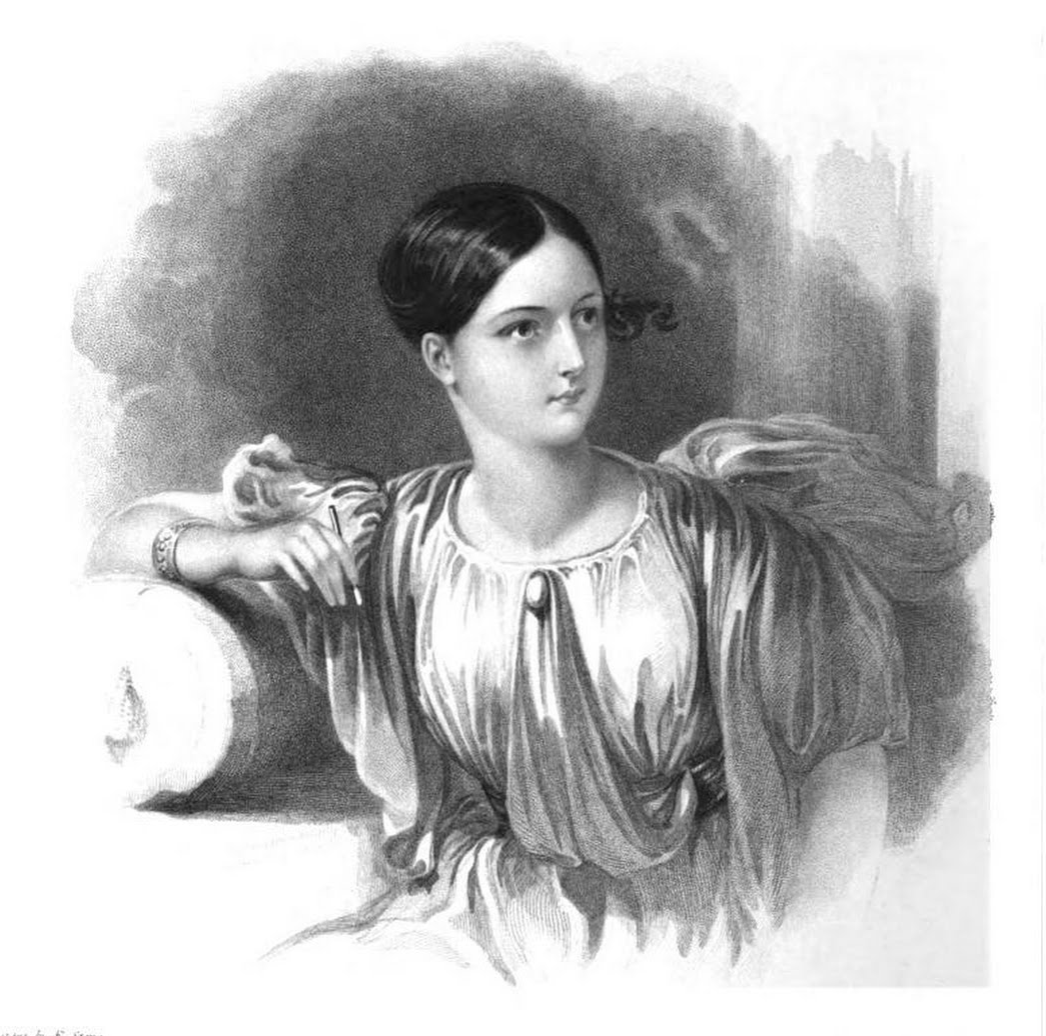
Fanciful portrait of Erinna from Finden's Gallery of Graces (1834)

Erinna (/ɪˈrɪnə/; Ancient Greek: Ἤριννα) was an ancient Greek poet. She is best known for her long poem The Distaff, a 300-line hexameter lament for her childhood friend Baucis, who had died shortly after her marriage. A large fragment of this poem was discovered in 1928 at Oxyrhynchus in Egypt. Along with The Distaff, three epigrams ascribed to Erinna are known, preserved in the Greek Anthology. The Suda states that her verses were regarded as equal to those of Homer.

Biographical details about Erinna's life are uncertain. She is generally thought to have lived in the first half of the fourth century BC, though some ancient traditions have her as a contemporary of Sappho; Telos is generally considered to be her most likely birthplace, but Tenos, Teos, Rhodes, and Lesbos are all also mentioned by ancient sources as her home.

== Life ==
Little ancient evidence about Erinna's life survives, and the testimony which does is often contradictory. Her dates are uncertain. According to the Suda, a 10th-century encyclopedia, she was one of Sappho's companions, placing her floruit in the sixth century BC. The latest date given for Erinna in the ancient sources is that provided by Eusebius, who suggests the mid-fourth century BC. Due to similarities between her work and that of the third-century BC poets Theocritus and Asclepiades, and an epigram by Antiphanes which groups her with Callimachus, scholars now tend to believe that Erinna was an early Hellenistic poet. However this would contradict Tatian's claim that she was sculpted by Naucydes, who was active around 400 BC.

Ancient testimony is divided on where Erinna was from: possibilities include Teos, Telos, Tenos, Mytilene, and Rhodes. Sylvia Barnard argues that Erinna was from Telos on the grounds of her dialect, though Donald Levin notes that while based on Doric, Erinna's dialect is a literary creation and does not accurately reflect her own native dialect. It is likely that Erinna was born into a wealthy family, and would have been taught to read and write poetry – Teos, one of Erinna's possible birthplaces, is one of the few places in the ancient Greek world where epigraphical evidence that girls were educated survives.

Three epigrams preserved in the Greek Anthology suggest that Erinna died young – according to the poet Asclepiades shortly after composing the Distaff aged 19, though the earliest source to explicitly fix her date of death at age 19 is the Suda. Marylin B. Arthur, however, argues that though the character of Erinna in the Distaff was 19, she did not necessarily compose the poem when she was that age.

== Works ==
=== The Distaff ===
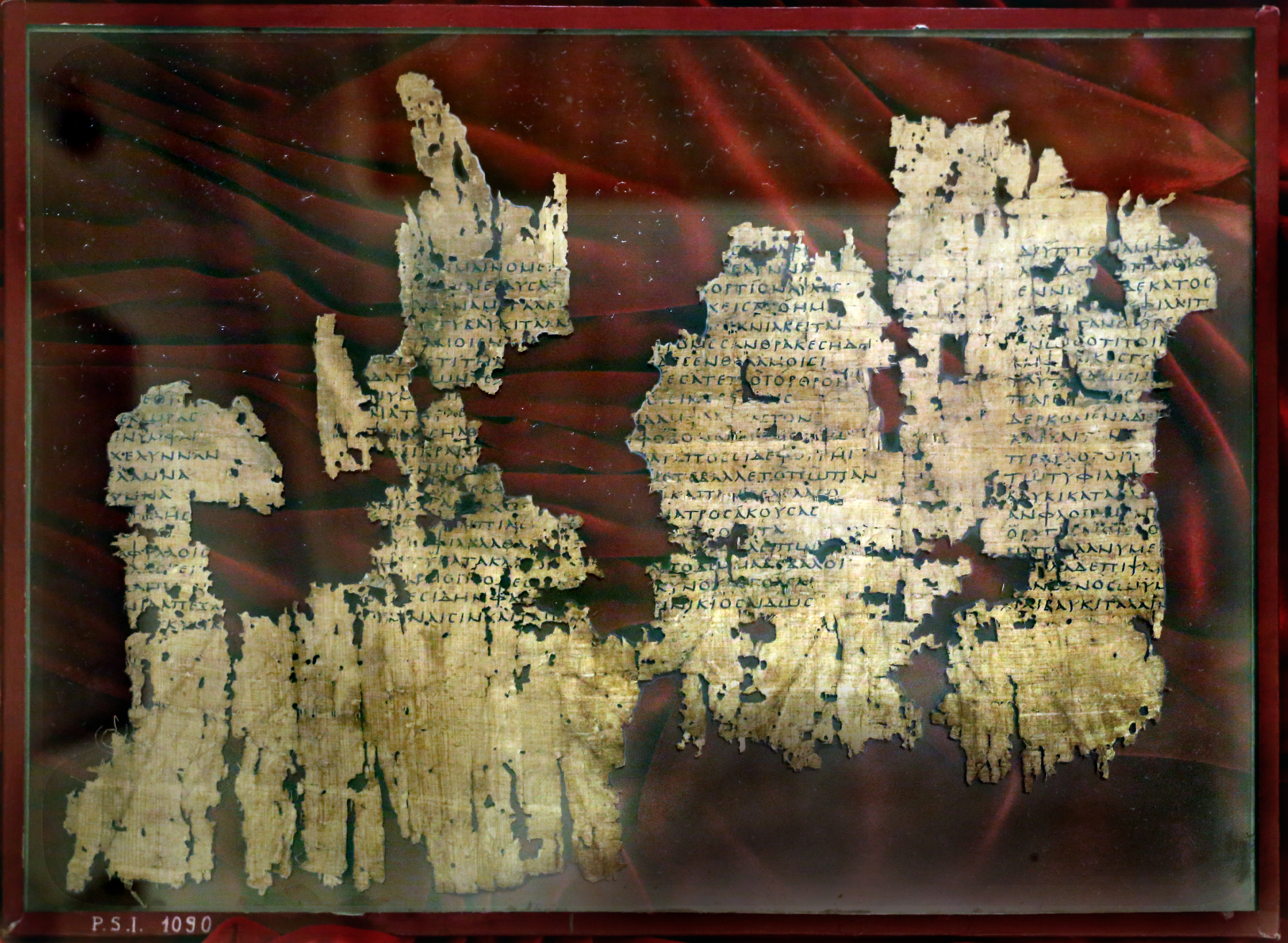
PSI 1090, which preserves fragments of 54 lines of Distaff

Erinna's fame is founded on her 300-line hexameter poem, the Distaff. The poem, supposedly composed when she was just nineteen, is a lament for her friend Baucis, who died shortly after her marriage. Unlike most ancient Greek hexameter poetry, which was written in an Ionian dialect, Distaff was written in a mixture of Aeolian and Doric.

Distaff survives only in fragments. Parts of 54 lines, of which only one line is complete, are known, preserved on a second century AD papyrus discovered at Oxyrhynchus, PSI 1090. Three other fragments of hexameter poetry attributed to Erinna survive, two quoted by Stobaeus and one by Athenaeus. One of the quotations in Stobaeus matches up with line 46 of PSI 1090; both of the other fragments also probably come from Distaff. Another papyrus fragment, Papyrus Oxyrhynchus 8, was identified by Maurice Bowra as possibly being from Distaff; however Martin Litchfield West dismisses this on dialectical grounds.

In the first half of the long surviving fragment of the Distaff, the narrator recalls her childhood with Baucis. She speaks of a game the two played, described by Julius Pollux, who calls it chelichelone ("torty-tortoise"), and of their fear of Mormo, a Greek bogeywoman. Following this, there is a short section on Baucis' forgetfulness – the text is fragmentary, but possibly the narrator is saying that when she married, Baucis forgot the childhood which has just been described. Finally, there is a reference to the narrator's inability to view a corpse, and two mentions of the word aidos ("shame") – presumably Baucis has died, and the narrator is ashamed that she cannot mourn her friend. At this point the text becomes too fragmentary to reconstruct it further.

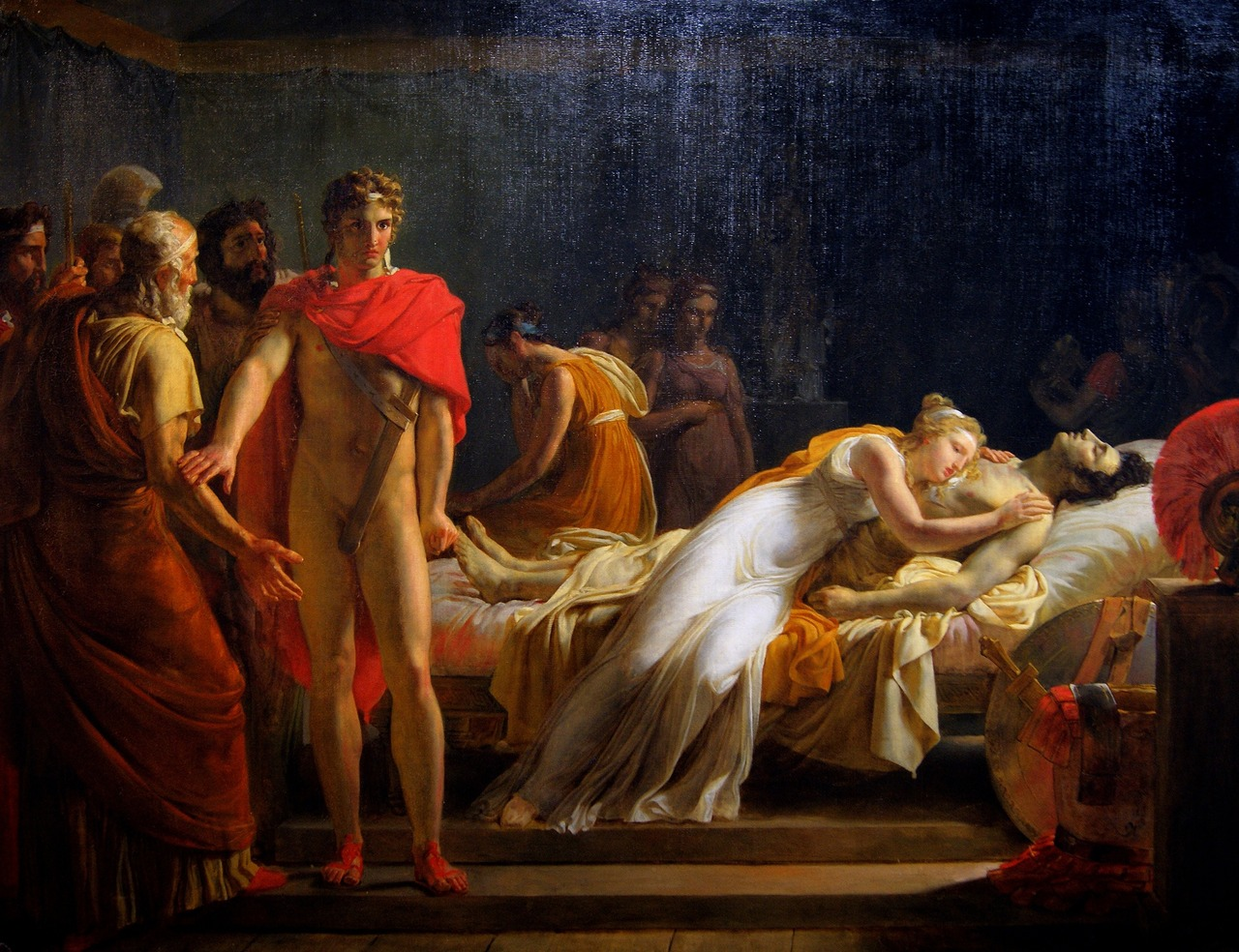
Léon Cogniet, Briseis Laments the Death of Patroclus 1815. The Distaff is a literary version of the ancient Greek funeral lament; Diane Rayor specifically identifies Briseis' lament for Patroclus in Homer's Iliad as a model for the poem

The Distaff is a literary version of the goos – the lament chanted by the female relatives of the deceased during the prothesis (laying out the body). Along with the goos, Jackie Murray and Jonathan Rowland suggest that the poem has features of the work-song.

Earlier literary depictions of the goos, also in hexameter verse, are found in the Iliad, and several scholars have seen Erinna's poem as making use of this literary precedent. Marilyn Skinner identifies three examples of the goos in the Iliad: Briseis' lament for Patroclus, Andromache's on seeing Achilles dragging Hector's corpse around the walls of Troy, and the lament sung by Andromache, Hecuba, and Helen at Hector's wake. Skinner identifies "marked thematic and verbal correspondences" between the Distaff and the songs of mourning in the Iliad. For instance, Erinna's recollections of her early life with Baucis parallel Andromache's of her son's interactions with Hector, and Helen's of Hector supporting her when she first came to Troy. Diane Rayor specifically identifies Briseis' lament as a model for the Distaff.

Along with Homer, the other major literary influence on Erinna's Distaff was Sappho. Kathryn Gutzwiller has argued that this incorporation of Sapphic themes into a poem of lamentation is Erinna's way of feminising a work based on a Homeric model. John Rauk notes particular similarities with fragment 94, with both works on themes of remembrance and forgetting. Diane Rayor, however, rejects this, disputing Rauk's belief that Sappho 94 is a farewell to a companion who is leaving to marry.

=== Epigrams ===
Along with the fragments of the Distaff, three epigrams attributed to Erinna survive. These are in the Doric dialect, and all three are preserved in the Greek Anthology. Two of these are, like Distaff, about the death of Baucis; the third, which is similar to poems by Nossis, is about a portrait of a girl called Agatharchis. The two Baucis-epigrams are in the style of ancient epitaphs, though the fact there are two suggests that neither was in fact written as a tomb inscription.

The authorship of these is disputed: Rauk and West both argue that none of the epigrams were authored by Erinna. Rauk suggests that the two Baucis-epigrams were written by later authors as a tribute to Erinna, and West notes that there is nothing in the epigrams which the authors could not have learnt from Distaff. The third epigram is described by Rauk as a "commonplace", containing "nothing to support Erinna's authorship", and West suggests that Nossis is a more likely author. On the other hand, Sarah Pomeroy argues for Erinna's authorship of all three epigrams, and Jane McIntosh Snyder describes them as "probably by Erinna". Other scholars, including Sylvia Barnard, Elizabeth Manwell, and Diane Rayor, accept the epigrams as being authored by Erinna without explicitly addressing the dispute.

== Reception ==
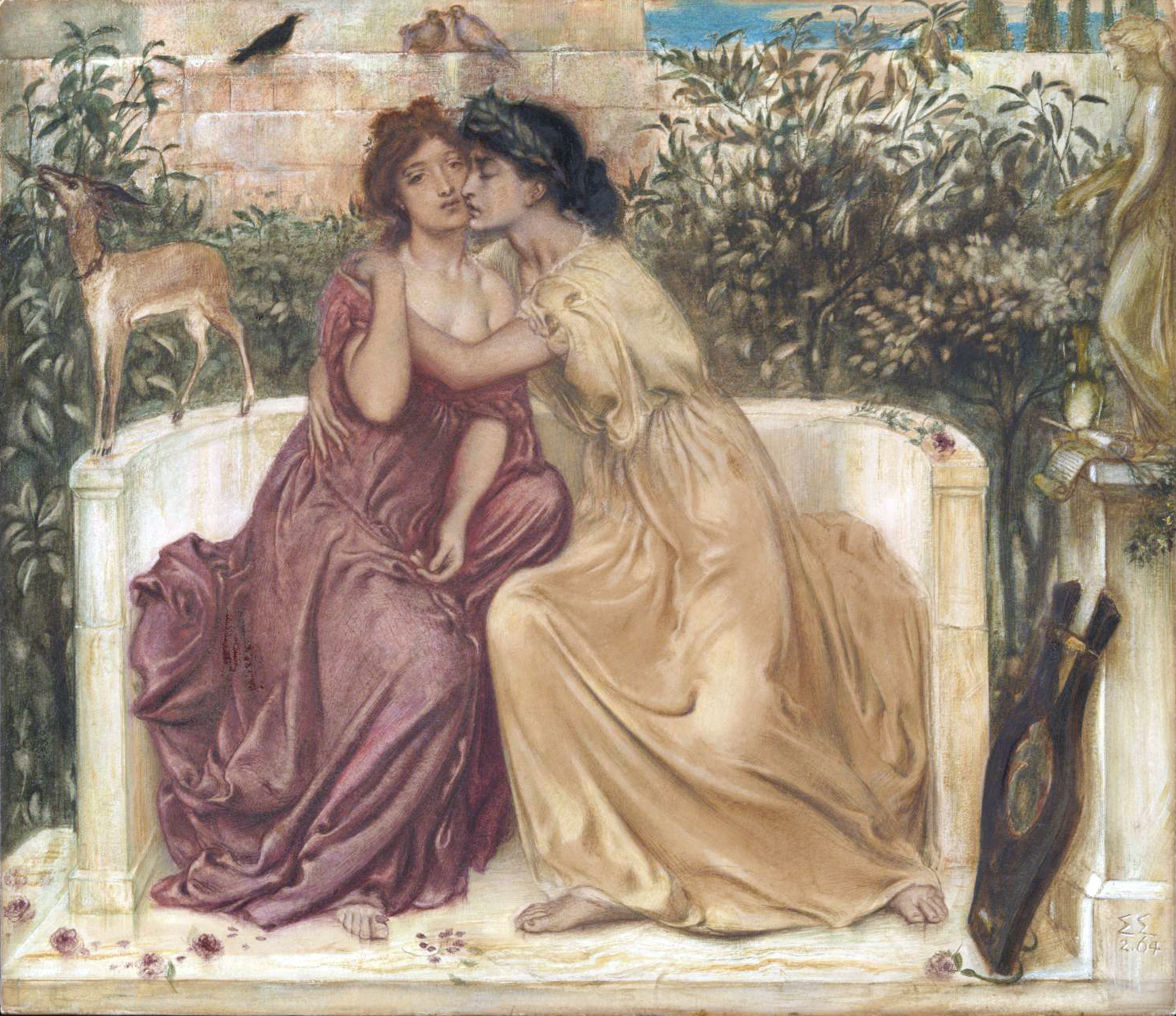
Sappho and Erinna in a Garden at Mytilene by Simeon Solomon (1864)

In antiquity Erinna was regarded as one of the best Greek women poets, second only to Sappho, though today she is little-known. Antipater of Thessalonica included her in his list of "nine earthly muses". Several other epigrams collected in the Greek Anthology praise her, and in Meleager's "Garland" her work is compared to the "sweet, maidenly coloured crocus". The only negative ancient testimony about Erinna comes from an epigram by Antiphanes (AP 11.322), which itself attests to Erinna's high reputation among the followers of Callimachus. The Distaff may have been alluded to by Callimachus in his Aetia, both in the introductory poem and the concluding "Lock of Berenice", and by Theocritus in Idyll II; Bion of Smyrna's "Lament for Adonis" imitates Erinna. All of this ancient testimony about Erinna suggests that she was a major figure in Hellenistic poetry.

From the early modern period, Erinna was frequently associated with Sappho: Mademoiselle de Scudéry portrayed Sappho encouraging Erinna to write poetry in "Sapho à Erinna"; Eduard Mörike characterised the two as friends in "Erinna an Sappho"; Rainer Maria Rilke's "Sappho an Eranna" and "Eranna an Sappho" together make up a dialogue between the poets; Estelle Anna Lewis's Sappho portrays Erinna as a confidante of Sappho; and Simeon Solomon's painting Sappho and Erinna in a Garden at Mytilene shows the two as lovers. Others were influenced by Erinna's lament for Baucis to deal with death as a theme: Johann Gottfried Herder's poem "Erinna" addresses the poet's early death, while Nicolò Fontei's song "Pianto d'Erinna" has Erinna mourn a male lover.

Today, so little of Erinna's work survives that it is difficult to judge her poetry, though what has survived of Distaff does, according to Ian Plant, bear out the poem's ancient reputation. The discovery of fragments from the Distaff in 1928 triggered increased academic interest in Erinna. Eva Stehle sees Erinna's poetry as significant as one of the very few sources of evidence about the relationship between mothers and daughters in the ancient Greek world. Erinna has also been read by feminist scholars as part of a female poetic tradition in ancient Greece, along with others including Sappho and Nossis.

== Works cited ==
- Arthur, Marylin B. (1980). "The Tortoise and the Mirror: Erinna PSI 1090". The Classical World. 74 (2). The Johns Hopkins University Press: 53–65. doi:10.2307/4349268. JSTOR 4349268.
- Balmer, Josephine (1996). Classical Women Poets. Newcastle-upon-Tyne: Bloodaxe Books. ISBN 1-85224-342-2.
- Barnard, Sylvia (1978). "Hellenistic Women Poets". The Classical Journal. 73 (3). The Classical Association of the Middle West and South, Inc.: 204–213. JSTOR 3296687.
- Greene, Ellen (2005). "Playing with Tradition: Gender and Innovation in the Epigrams of Anyte". In Greene, Ellen (ed.). Women Poets in Ancient Greece and Rome. University of Oklahoma Press. ISBN 9780806136639.
- Gutzwiller, Kathryn (2020). "Under the Sign of the Distaff: Aetia 1.5, Spinning and Erinna". The Classical Quarterly. 70 (1): 177–191. doi:10.1017/S0009838820000543.
- Joeres, Yvonne (2016). "Erinna". Brill's New Pauly Supplements II - Volume 7 : Figures of Antiquity and their Reception in Art, Literature and Music. doi:10.1163/2468-3418_bnps7_SIM_004630.
- Levin, Donald Norman (1962). "Quaestiones Erinneanae". Harvard Studies in Classical Philology. 66. Department of the Classics, Harvard University: 193–204. doi:10.2307/310740. JSTOR 310740.
- Manwell, Elizabeth (2005). "Dico Ergo Sum: Erinna's Voice and Poetic Reality". In Greene, Ellen (ed.). Women Poets in Ancient Greece and Rome. University of Oklahoma Press. ISBN 9780806136639.
- Murray, Jackie M.; Rowland, Jonathan (2007). "Gendered Voices in Hellenistic Epigram". In Bing, Peter; Bruss, Jon (eds.). Brill's Companion to Hellenistic Epigram. Leiden: Brill. ISBN 9789047419402.
- Plant, I. M. (2004). Women Writers of Ancient Greece and Rome: an Anthology. Norman: University of Oklahoma Press. ISBN 9780806136226.
- Pomeroy, Sarah (1978). "Supplementary Notes on Erinna". Zeitschrift für Papyrologie und Epigraphik. 32. Dr. Rudolf Habelt GmbH: 17–22. JSTOR 20185555.
- Rauk, John (1989). "Erinna's Distaff and Sappho's Fr. 94". Greek, Roman, and Byzantine Studies. 30: 101–116. Archived from the original on 2018-04-29.
- Rayor, Diane (2005). "The Power of Memory in Erinna and Sappho". In Greene, Ellen (ed.). Women Poets in Ancient Greece and Rome. University of Oklahoma Press. ISBN 9780806136646.
- Robbins, Emmet (2006). "Erinna". Brill's New Pauly. doi:10.1163/1574-9347_bnp_e401510.
- Skinner, Marilyn B. (1982). "Briseis, the Trojan Women, and Erinna". The Classical World. 75 (5). The Johns Hopkins University Press: 265–269. doi:10.2307/4349379. JSTOR 4349379.
- Skinner, Marilyn B. (2013). Sexuality in Greek and Roman culture (2nd ed.). New York: Wiley-Blackwell. ISBN 9781118611081.
- Snyder, Jane McIntosh (1991). The Woman and the Lyre: Women Writers in Classical Greece and Rome. Carbondale: SIU Press. ISBN 9780809317066.
- Stehle, Eva (2001). "The Good Daughter: Mothers' Tutelage in Erinna's Distaff and Fourth-Century Epitaphs". In Lardinois, André; McClure, Laura (eds.). Making Silence Speak: Women's Voices in Greek Literature and Society. Princeton: Princeton University Press. ISBN 9780691004662.
- West, Martin Litchfield (1977). "Erinna". Zeitschrift für Papyrologie und Epigraphik. 25. Dr. Rudolf Habelt GmbH: 95–119. JSTOR 20181346.
