= Hispanic Review =

- Discipline: Hispanic, Catalan and Luso-Brazilian Literature and Culture
- Language: Spanish, Portuguese, English
- Edited by: Ignacio Javier López

Publication details
- Former name: Revue Hispanique (France)
- History: 1933-present
- Publisher: University of Pennsylvania Press (United States)
- Frequency: Quarterly
- Impact factor: 0.12 (2005)

Standard abbreviations
- ISO 4: Hisp. Rev.

Indexing
- ISSN: 0018-2176 (print); 1553-0639 (web)
- LCCN: 34028948
- JSTOR: 00182176
- OCLC no.: 1752093

Links
- Journal homepage; Online access at Project MUSE

Published in Philadelphia, the Hispanic Review is the oldest peer-reviewed academic journal dedicated to research in Hispanic, Catalan, Gallego and Luso-Brazilian literature and culture published in North America. The journal has been published continuously since 1933 (except for a brief hiatus during World War II). Following a recommendation of the Modern Association of America, the journal was created in 1933 to replace the French journal Revue Hispanique that had just stopped publication.

From its creation in 1933 until 2022, the journal was edited by the Department of Romance Languages at the University of Pennsylvania. After the department dissolved in 2022, the Department of Spanish and Portuguese at PENN now publishes the journal.

The journal is published quarterly by the University of Pennsylvania Press. It is available online through Project MUSE and JSTOR. The current general editor is Professor Jorge Téllez, Associate Professor of Spanish and Portuguese at the University of Pennsylvania. Past General Editors include Russell P. Sebold, the longest-serving editor, having directed the journal continuously for over twenty-nine years, and Ignacio Javier López, who served as General Editor for sixteen years. Román de la Campa, Barbara Fuchs, and Michael Solomon have also served as General Editors.

Current issues of the journal are available electronically through Project MUSE; earlier issues can be found through JSTOR.
