= Sappho and Erinna in a Garden at Mytilene =

Painting by Simeon Solomon

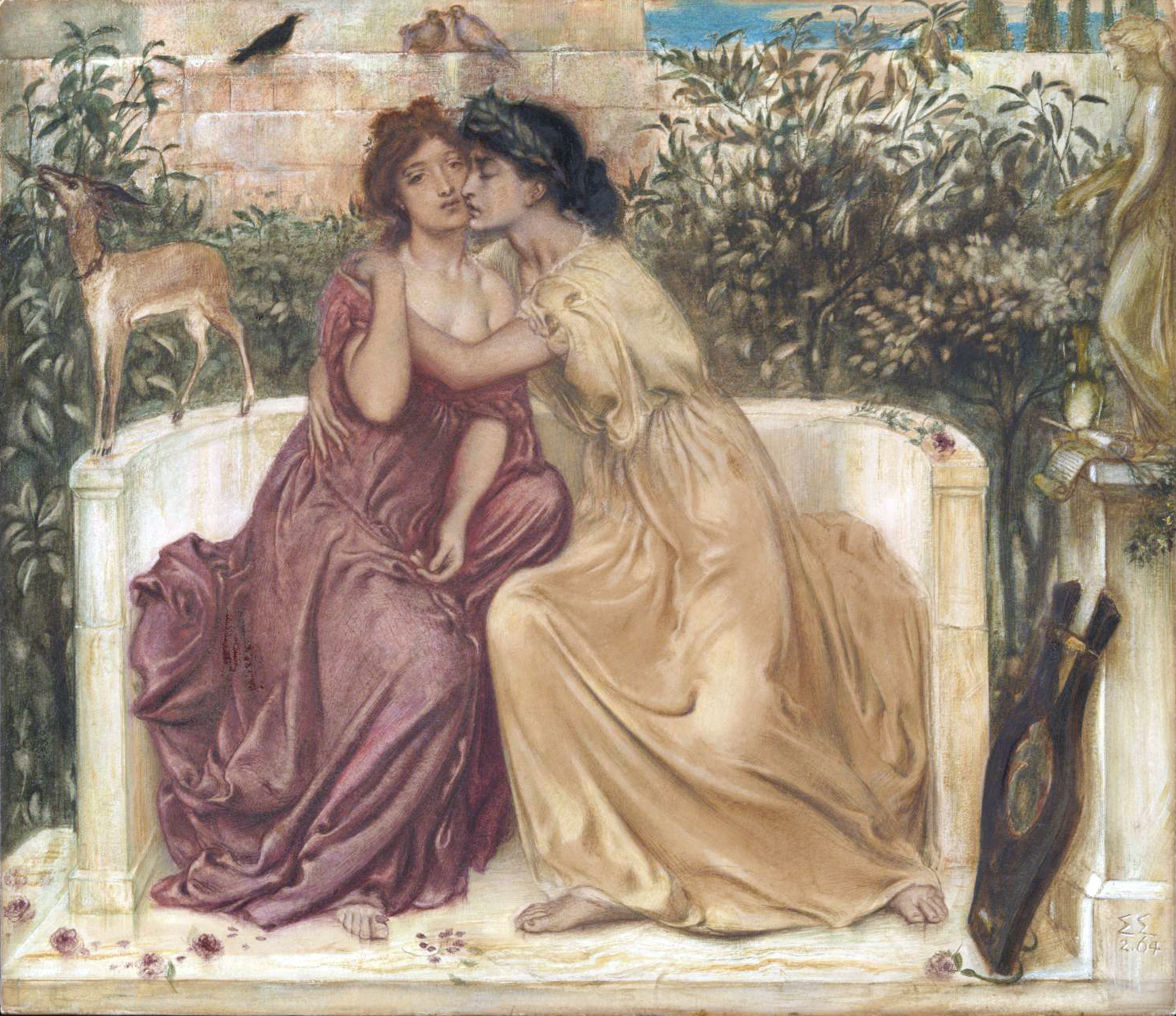
Sappho and Erinna in a Garden at Mytilene, Simeon Solomon, 1864, Tate Britain

Sappho and Erinna in a Garden at Mytilene is an 1864 watercolour painting on paper by Simeon Solomon. The painting measures 33 cm × 38.1 cm (13.0 in × 15.0 in). It has been in the collection of Tate Britain since it was bought at auction in 1980.

The small painting depicts two Ancient Greek poets, Sappho (right, in a yellow robe) beside Erinna (left, in a pink robe). They are seated on a stone bench with a high curved back amid the foliage of a garden in Mytilene, on the island of Lesbos. Sappho leans in to embrace Erinna, their faces gently touching. The enigmatic work contains details that can be interpreted in different ways. The two doves perched on the wall behind the poets may symbolise their love, with flowers and petals strewn around them. Alongside the doves, a blackbird may represent a third party intruding on the lovebirds. A small deer stands on the bench beside Erinna: the animal is an attribute of Artemis, but also sacred to Apollo, perhaps associating Sappho with the Muses.

Sappho may be identified by her traditional attributes lying discarded beside a female statue nearby: some lines of poetry, and a musical instrument. A small snake emerges from behind the instrument, slithering towards a flower. It has been suggested that the Sappho figure resembles either Keomi Gray or Fanny Eaton, both models for several pre-Raphaelite painters.

The date and Solomon's signature as two Greek sigmas are portrayed as a stone instruction, "ΣΣ / 2.64", in the lower right corner. An inscription on the painting's stretcher reads: "In a garden of Mytilene/Painted in Water Colors by/ Simeon Solomon/1864".

By the 1860s, Solomon, then aged in his 20s, had turned from the usual biblical subjects of his earlier works towards themes from classical history. Inspired by the writing on Sappho by Algernon Swinburne, including Swinburne's poem Anactoria, Solomon believed Erinna to have been a companion of Sappho on Lesbos during the late 7th century BC (a common misconception at that time, possibly due to a fragment of Sappho's poetry mentioning "Eranna"). It is now thought that Erinna lived elsewhere several centuries later: on the island of Telos, during the Hellenistic period towards the end of the 4th century BC. Only fragments of each poet's work has survived.

The painting was bought by the art collector James Leathart, perhaps from Solomon directly or through Solomon's friend Dante Gabriel Rossetti. After Leathart's death in 1895, the painting was auctioned by his executors in 1897. It later came into the collection of Solomon Golding, and was sold by his son Jessel Golding at Sotheby's in 1980, when it was bought by the Tate.

The Tate also holds Solomon's slightly earlier, c. 1862, graphite on paper study of Sappho's head, also acquired in 1980. Each has somewhat androgynous features, with Sappho depicted by Solomon as more masculine and Erinna as more feminine, with softer features and partially exposed chest and shoulders.

An 1865 drawing by Solomon develops the theme, with Erinna and Sappho now accompanied by a male companion. Sappho looks disconsolate and Erinna's affections are turned away towards the man, perhaps echoing the lines of Sappho 94.

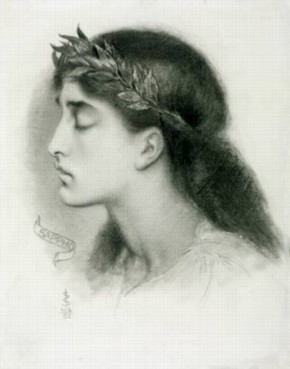
Study of Sappho, 1862

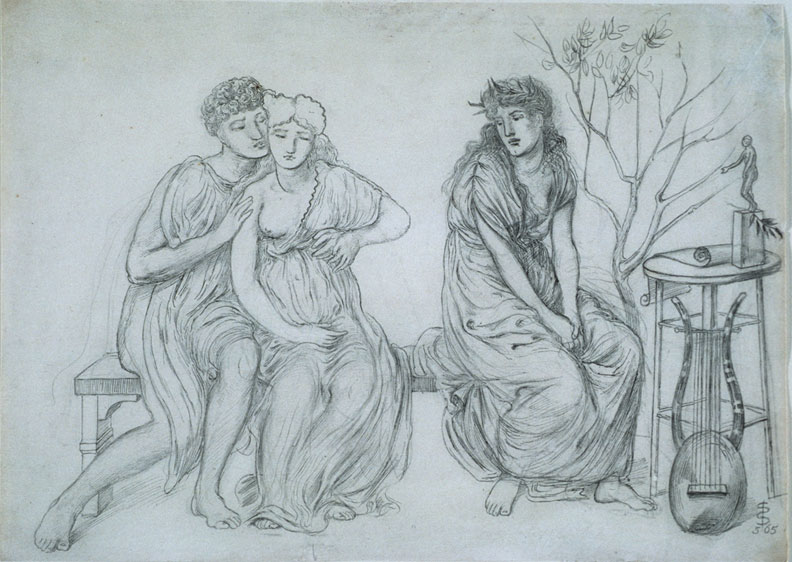
Erinna Taken from Sappho, 1865
