= Michael Solomon =

Michael Solomon may refer to:

- Mike Solomon (born 1954), athlete from Trinidad and Tobago
- Meyer Solomon (Michael), 18th-century manufacturer at Bishopsgate, London
- Michael Solomon Alexander (1799–1845), first Anglican Bishop in Jerusalem
- Michael Jay Solomon (born 1938), American businessman and entertainment executive

== See also ==
- Mikael Salomon, Danish filmmaker
