= Abraham Solomon =

English painter

Abraham Solomon (London 7 May 1823 – 19 December 1862 Biarritz) was a British painter.

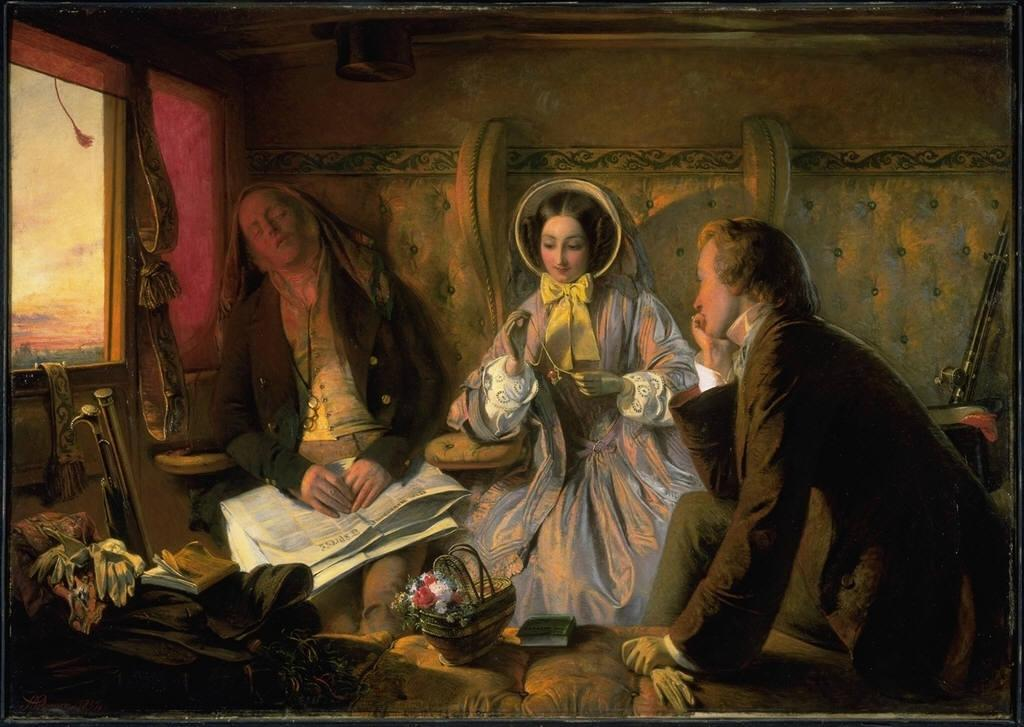
Original version of (Travelling) First Class - The Meeting. "And at first meeting loved"

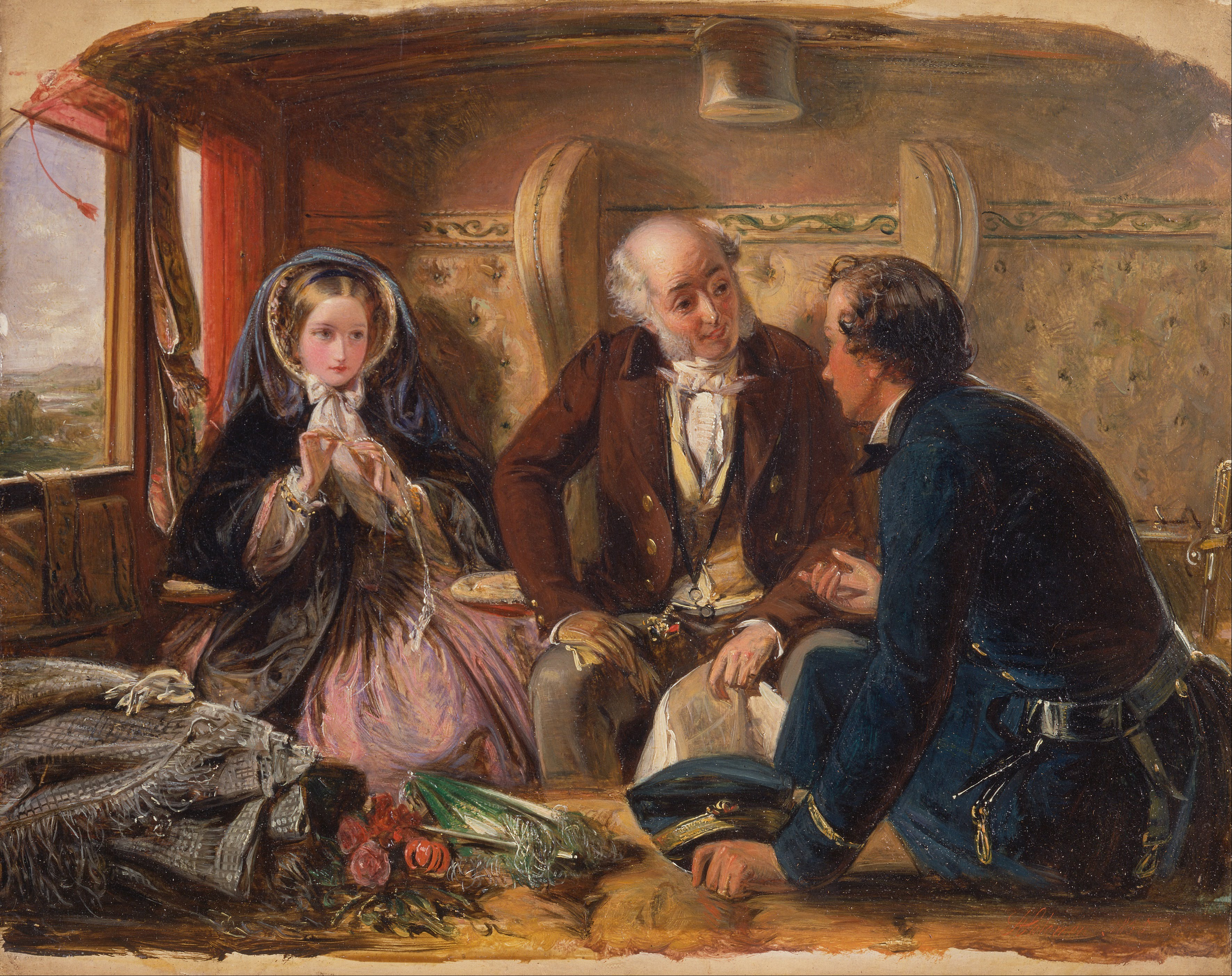
Revised version produced after the original proved controversial

The second son of eight children born to Meyer Solomon, a Leghorn hat manufacturer and his wife Catherine (Kate) Levy. His father was one of the first Jews to be admitted to the freedom of the city of London, and the family resided in Sandys Street, Bishopsgate in east London. Two of Abraham's siblings were also artists: his sister, Rebecca Solomon (1832–1886), and his youngest brother, Simeon Solomon (1840–1905), who acquired much acclaim as an associate of the Pre-Raphaelites and exhibited at the Royal Academy from 1858 to 1872; his later crayon drawings of idealized heads are still popular.

At the age of thirteen Abraham became a pupil in Sass's school of art in Bloomsbury, and in 1838 gained the Isis silver medal at the Society of Arts for a drawing from a statue. In 1839 he was admitted as a student of the Royal Academy, where he received in the same year a silver medal for drawing from the antique, and in 1843 another for drawing from the life.

Solomon died in Biarritz in France, of heart disease, on 19 December 1862, the same day on which he was elected an Associate of the Royal Academy. He married, on 10 May 1860, Ella, sister of Ernest Hart; she survived her husband.

== Works ==
His first exhibited work, Rabbi expounding the Scriptures, appeared at the Society of British Artists in 1840, and in the following year he sent to the Royal Academy My Grandmother and a scene from Sir Walter Scott's Fair Maid of Perth. These were followed (at the academy) by a scene from the Vicar of Wakefield in 1842, another from Crabbe's Parish Register in 1843, and a third from Peveril of the Peak in 1845. The Breakfast Table, exhibited in 1846, and a further scene from the Vicar of Wakefield in 1847, attracted some attention.

In 1848 appeared A Ball Room in the year 1760, and in 1849 the Academy for Instruction in the Discipline of the Fan, 1711, both of which pictures were distinguished by brilliancy of colour and careful study of costume. Too Truthful was his contribution to the exhibition of the Royal Academy in 1850, and An Awkward Position—an incident in the life of Oliver Goldsmith—to that of 1851. In 1851, also, he sent to the British Institution Scandal and La petite Dieppoise.

In 1852 appeared at the academy The Grisette and a scene from Molière's Tartuffe—the quarrel between Mariane and Valère, where Dorine interferes—and in 1853 Brunetta and Phillis, from the Spectator. In 1854, he sent to the academy First Class: The Meeting (National Gallery of Canada, Ottawa), and Second Class: The Parting (National Gallery of Australia, Canberra). Both were engraved in mezzotint by William Henry Simmons in 1857, and evidenced a great advance in Solomon's work. They show an originality of conception and design which is not apparent in his earlier work. His next contributions to the Royal Academy were A Contrast in 1855, The Bride and Doubtful Fortune in 1856, and Waiting for the Verdict in 1857. The last picture greatly increased his popularity; but its companion, Not Guilty, exhibited in 1859, was less successful. Both became the property of C. J. Lucas, esq., and were also engraved by Simmons. The Flight, Mlle. Blaiz, and The Lion in Love (also engraved by Simmons) were exhibited at the academy in 1858; Ici on rase, Brittany and The Fox and the Grapes in 1859; Drowned! Drowned! in 1860; Consolation and Le Malade Imaginaire in 1861; and The Lost Found in 1862. Art Critics in Brittany appeared at the British Institution in 1861.

His last work, Departure of the Diligence at Biarritz, is now at the Royal Holloway College, Egham.

== Gallery ==
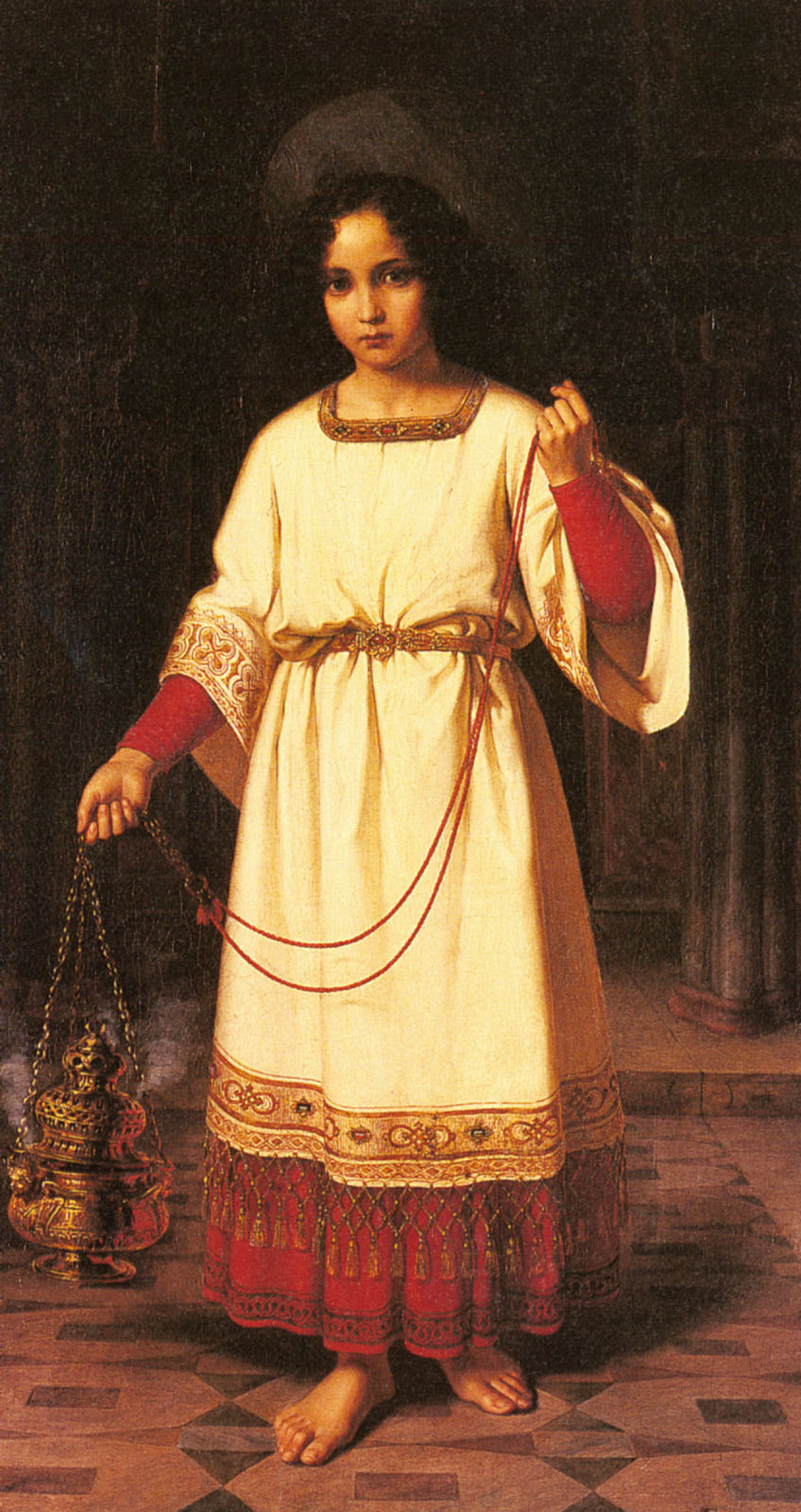
The Acolyte, 1842

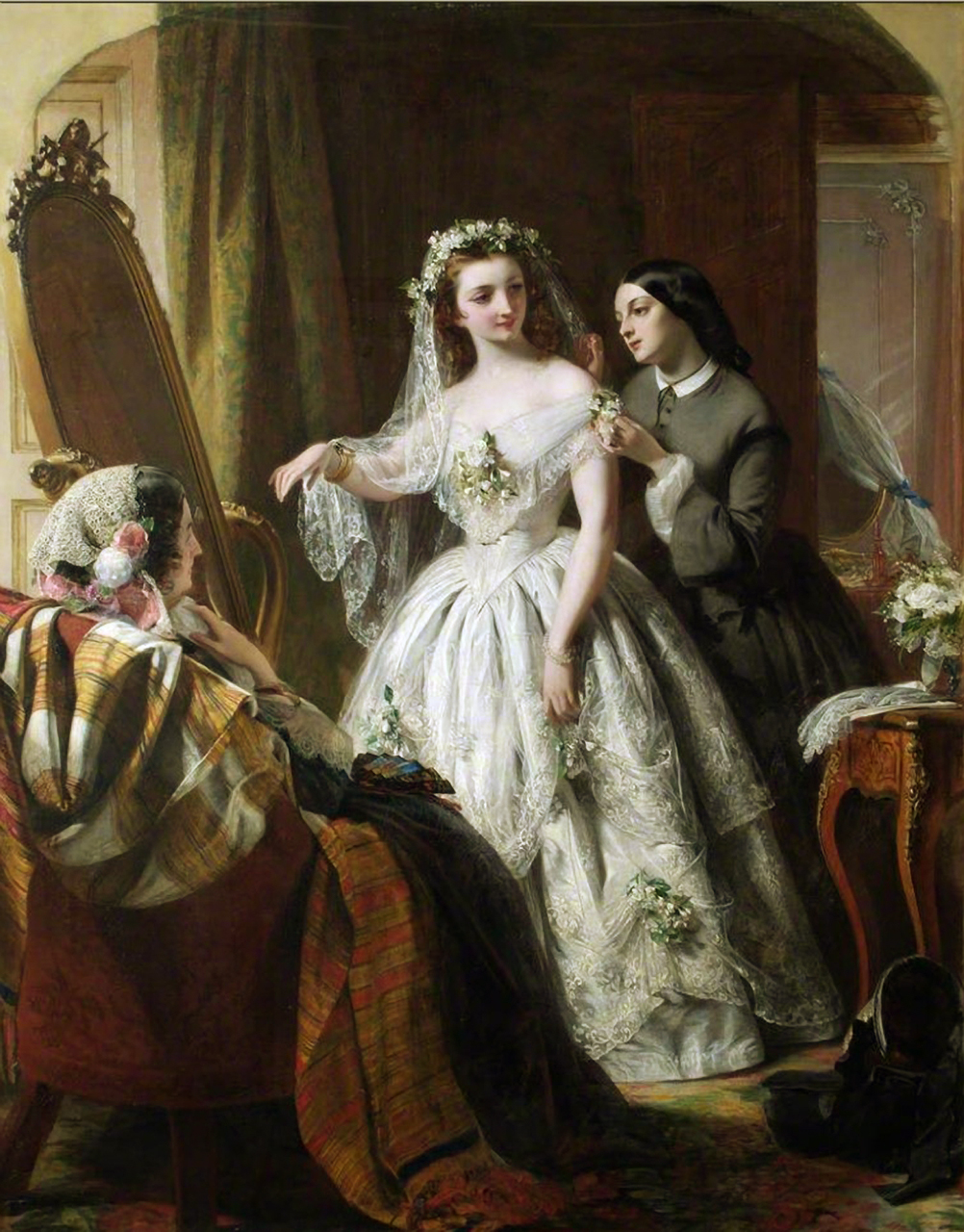
The Bride, 1856

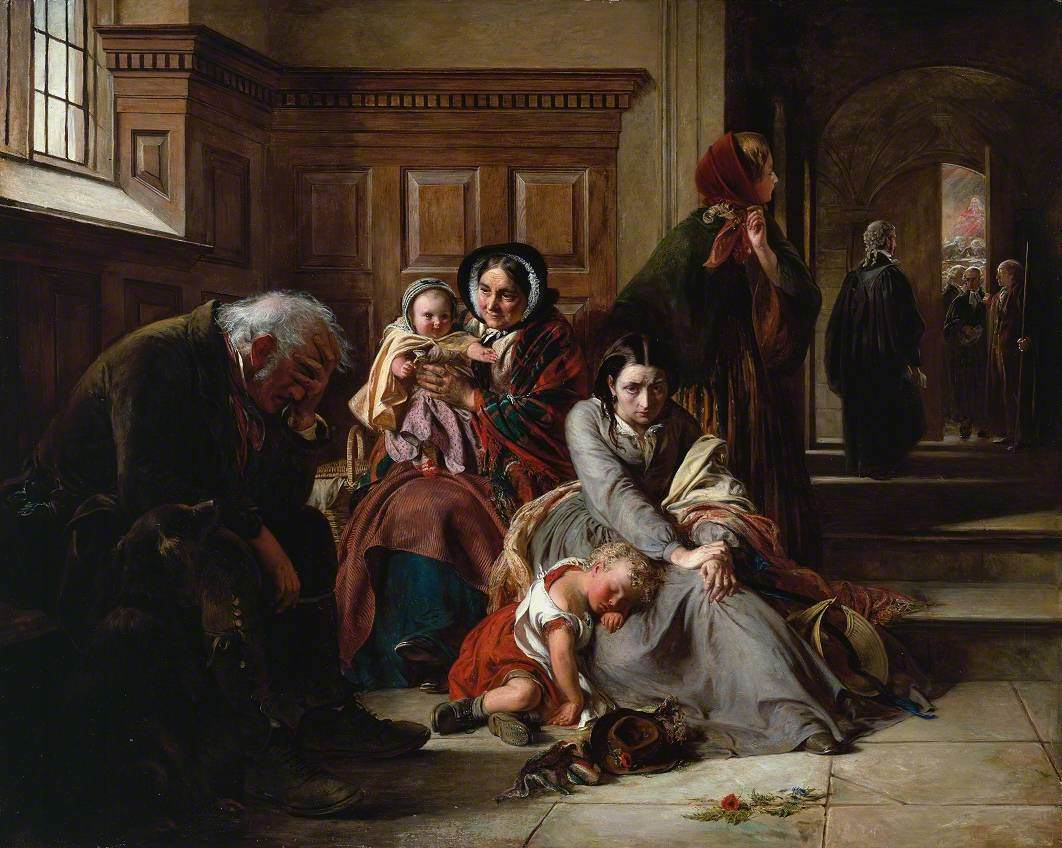
Waiting for the Verdict, 1857

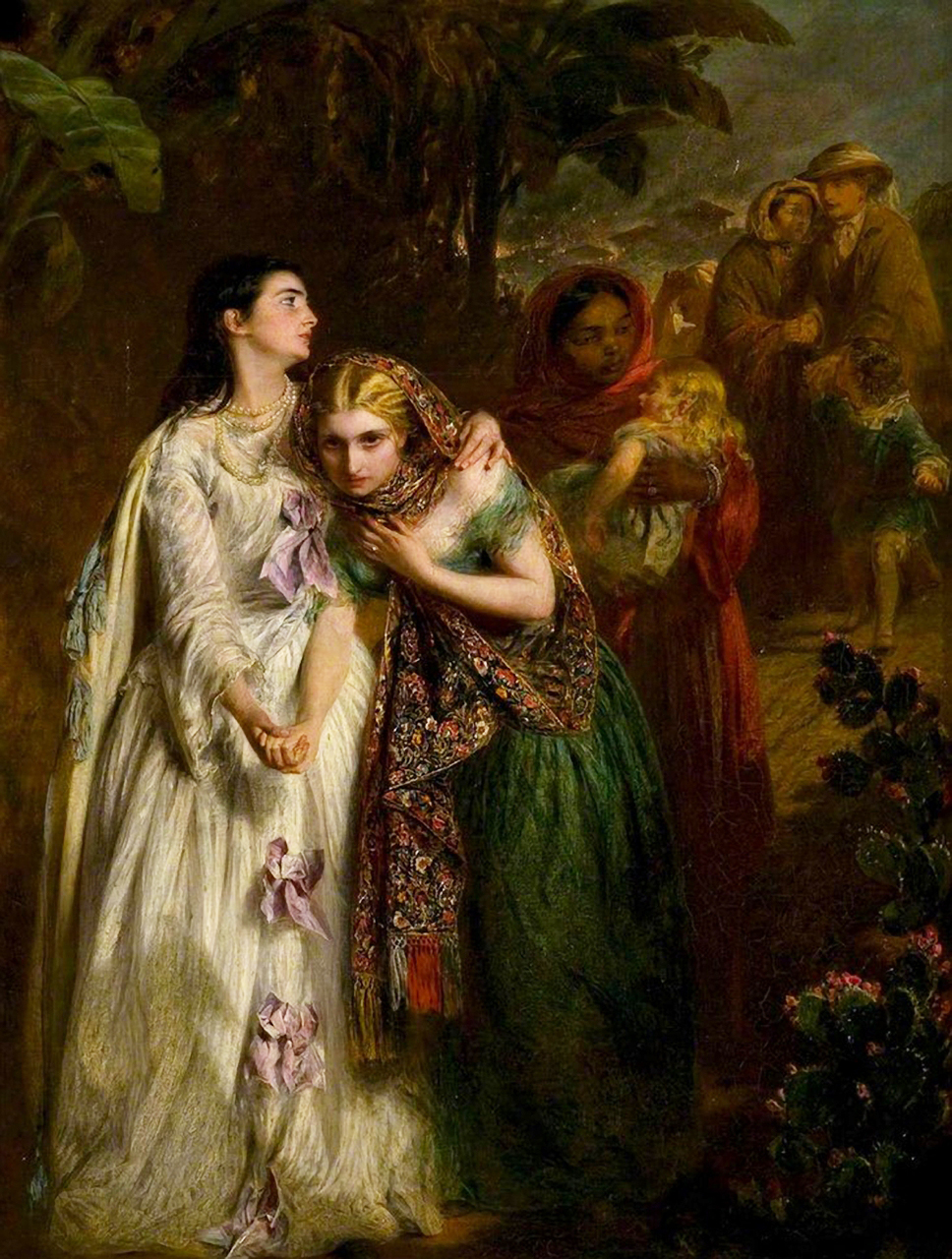
The Flight from Lucknow, 1858

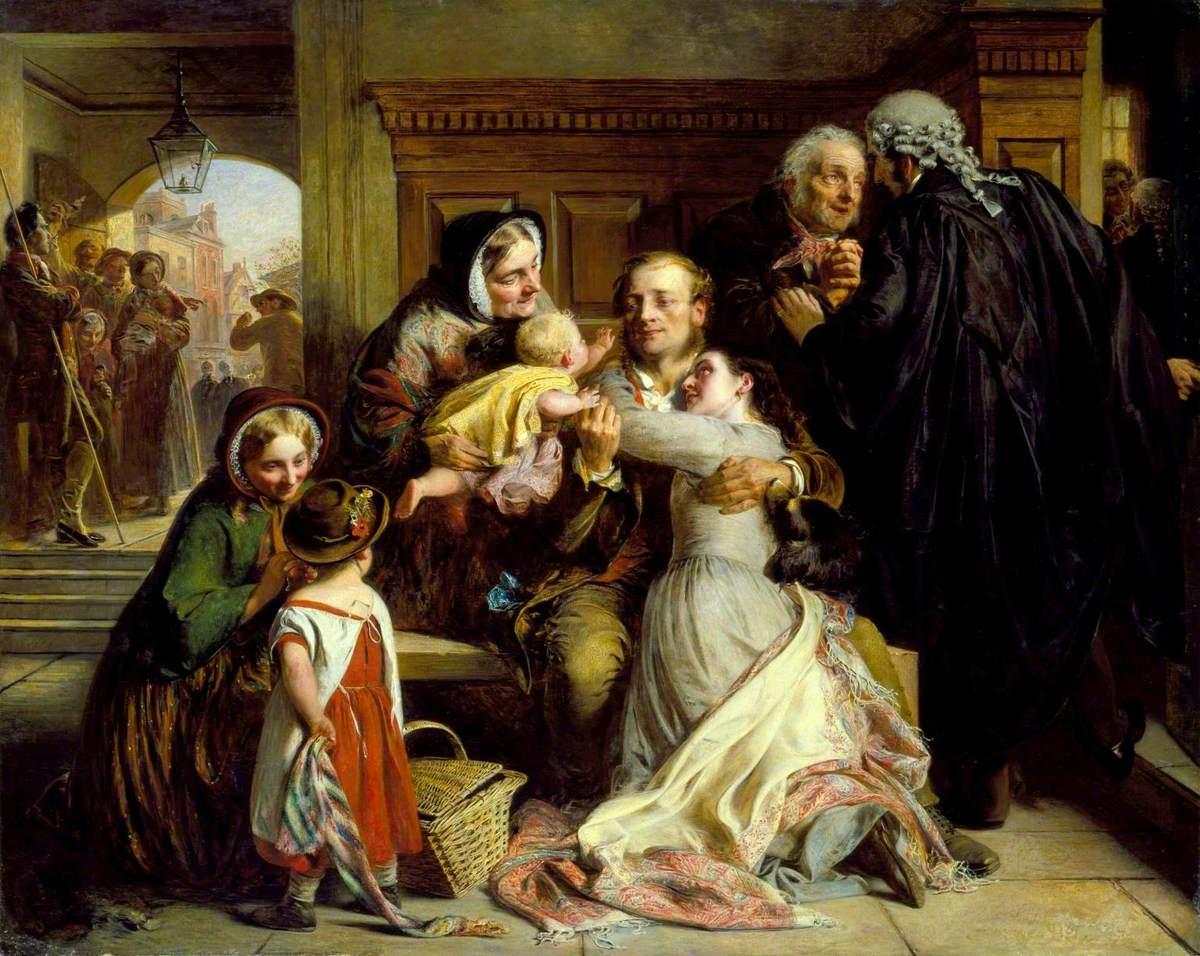
Not Guilty, 1859

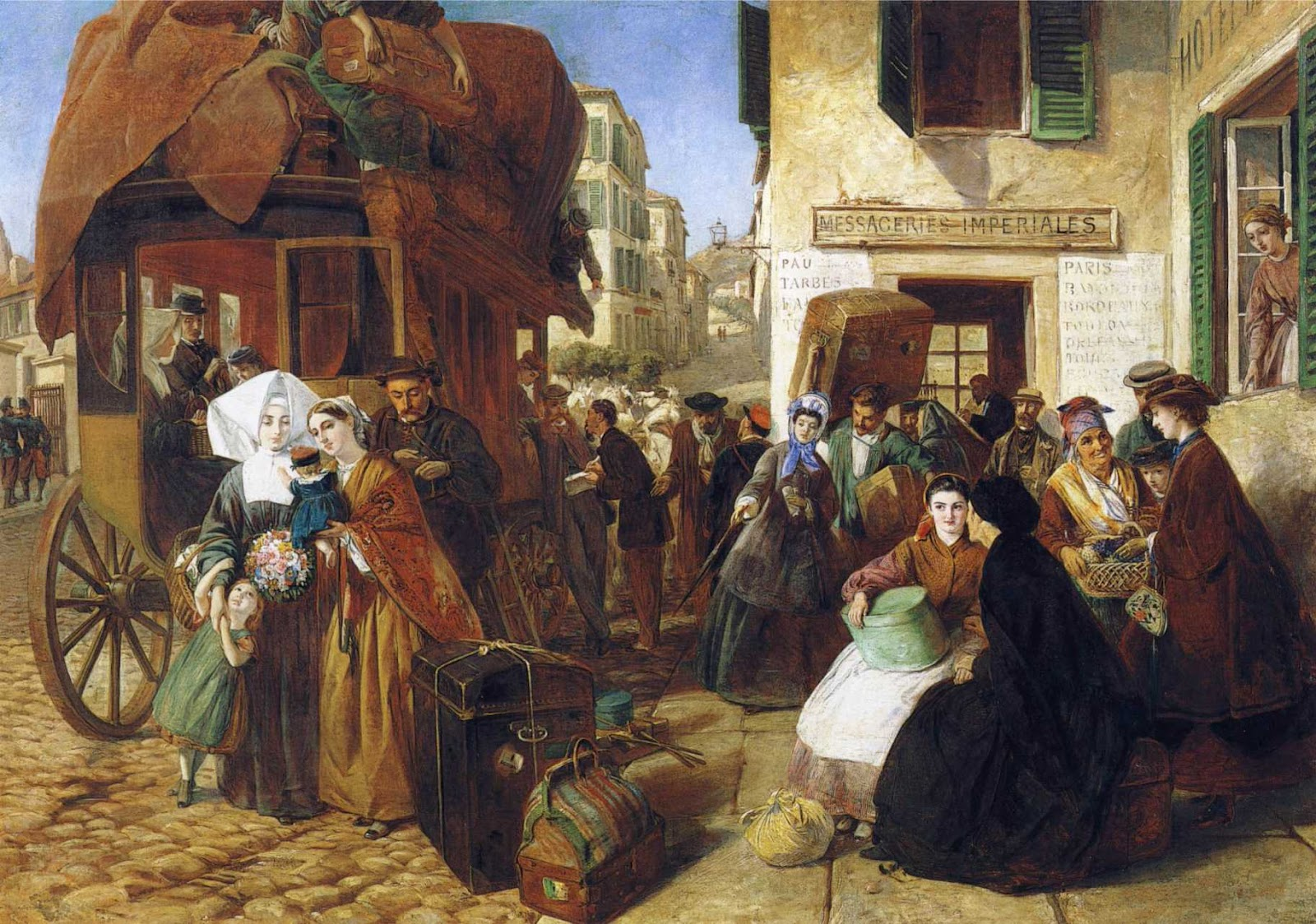
Departure of the Diligence, Biarritz, 1862
