= Lesbia Brandon =

19th-century erotic novel

- Editor: Randolph Hughes
- Author: Algernon Charles Swinburne
- Illustrator: Simeon Solomon
- Genre: Bildungsroman
- Set in: 19th-century England
- Published in: 1952
- Publisher: British Book Center
- Pages: 583
- Although published in 1952, the novel was written nearly a century earlier in the 19th-century.

Lesbia Brandon is an erotic novel written by Algernon Charles Swinburne between 1859 and 1868, but suppressed because it was considered pornographic in its day. It was originally illustrated by Simeon Solomon and featured depictions of sadomasochism, homosexuality, and incest. Lesbia Brandon was first published, posthumously, in 1952 by the British Book Center.

== Creation ==
Lesbia Brandon was Swinburne's fourth novel, although he both never titled nor finished it. In 1925, T. J. Wise named it "Lesbia Brandon" in his catalogue A Swinburne Library. Historians, however, generally believe Bertie to be the main character, not Lesbia Brandon.

Swinburne began working on the manuscript as early as 1859, according to watermarking on the paper he used, although not certain. By 1864, he had definitely begun writing the novel.

In the fall of 1877, Swinburne decided to put the manuscript in galley proofs, likely to preserve his work. In a 1878 letter to journalist Paul Hamilton Hayne, Swinburne wrote that his manuscript for what would become Lesbia Brandon was his "most important" work.

The novel was suppressed by Swinburne's contemporaries. Theodore Watts-Dunton, Edmund Gosse and T. J. Wise all found it to be unpublishable. Allegedly, Gosse and Wise both borrowed and failed to return parts of the manuscript in order to impede its publication. The novel's themes were undoubtedly controversial for the time: homosexuality, gender identity, and adultery, to name a few. Swinburne seemed aware of these controversies; in 1867, he wrote that Lesbia Brandon "will be more offensive and objectionable to Britannia than anything I have yet done."

Swinburne stated that he was inspired by Honoré de Balzac's style when writing Lesbia Brandon. Swinburne likely admired him since his novels were still considered controversial within 1860s England.

Swinburne had his friend Simeon Solomon illustrate the novel during the 1860s. Solomon was an artist known for his homosexuality and provocative paintings, making the match a good fit.

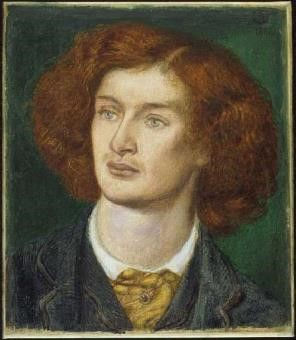
Portrait of the author Algernon Charles Swinburne by Dante Gabriel Rossetti, 1862

== Synopsis ==
The novel opens by describing Maggie, the sister of the protagonist. She is described as beautiful, and Swinburne likens her to her brother, Bertie, whom the story then follows. The main plot follows Herbert “Bertie” Seyton, a 9-year-old boy who is described with traditionally feminine attributes. His father has recently died; Maggie chose to adopt young Bertie with her husband, Lord Wariston.

Bertie's new home at Ensdon Residence is a coastal one, and as he grows older, Bertie develops a deep love for the ocean. Two years pass, and Maggie decides to hire a private tutor for Bertie named Denham. Denham is very strict in his attempts to prepare Bertie for Eton College. In Chapter 2, Denham flogs Bertie for swimming in waters when it may have been dangerous. Denham's behavior has been described as sexually sadistic, frequently relying on corporal punishment for his own pleasure.

Outside of his lessons, Bertie and Denham develop a friendship and go swimming together. Meanwhile, Denham and Maggie develop romantic feelings for one another, despite Maggie being married. Denham's sadistic tendencies reflect in his dynamic with Maggie; he wishes she were dead or in pain, and that Maggie would inflict pain upon him as well.

Later, Lesbia Brandon enters the story. Her name, Lesbia, is intended to be a reference to her lesbian sexual identity. When Lesbia meets Bertie, he is wearing women's clothing for a role in Lucretia Borgia. Lesbia shows romantic interest in the female-dressed Bertie, believing him to be Maggie's twin sister, and remains somewhat interested even after discovering his male gender. Bertie falls in love with Lesbia, but Lesbia's homosexuality is a major obstacle to their relationship. Instead, Lesbia develops love for Maggie, who does not reciprocate these feelings.

Maggie and Denham begin a true adulterous relationship, continuing it on for a couple years, before it is revealed that Denham is Maggie's half-sibling through an earlier extramarital affair. Therefore, their relationship is not only adulterous, but also incestuous. Denham commits suicide. Around the same time, Lesbia also commits suicide by ingesting opium and eau de cologne. Bertie kisses her briefly before she dies; Lesbia recoils at his touch. The novel ends to tell the reader that nothing is known of what happens to Bertie.

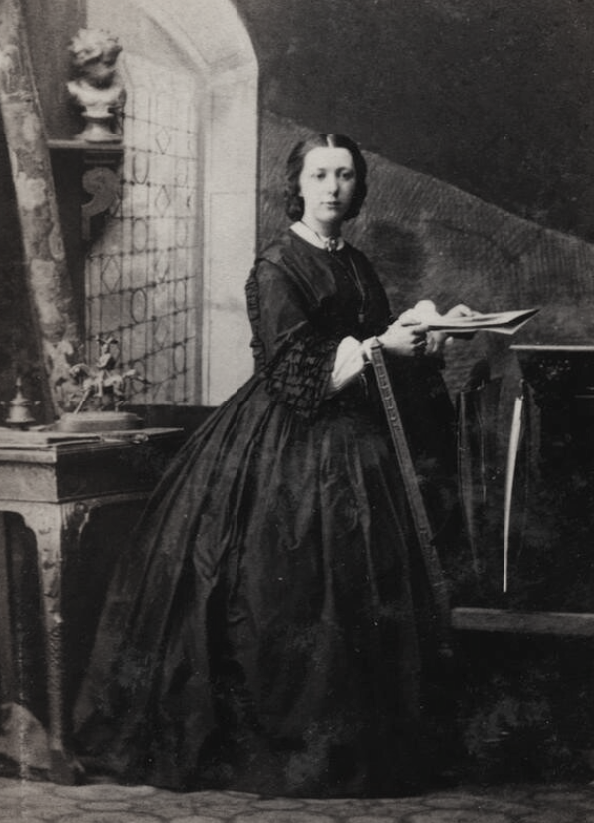
Mary Gordon, Swinburne's cousin, possible inspiration for Lesbia, and possibly in an incestuous relationship with Swinburne himself.

== Characters ==
- Herbert “Bertie” Seyton, the hero, a bright and lovable school boy.
- Denham, a masochistic tutor who begins an affair with Maggie.
- Lady Margaret "Maggie" Wariston, Bertie's sister who begins an affair with Denton.
- Lord Wariston, Margaret's husband.
- Mr. Linley, Lord Wariston's maternal uncle.
- Lesbia Brandon, a lesbian who is described as beautiful yet masculine, possibly inspired by Christina Rosetti or Mary Gordon, Swinburne's cousin.
- Attilio Mariani, an ex-revolutionary.

== Analysis ==
Lesbia Brandon is written in a combination of prose and verse. It is a bildungsroman with Bertie at its center, following him throughout his young adult life. Furthermore, it is generally thought that Lesbia Brandon contains some autobiographical elements. Like Bertie, Swinburne's father was absent from his life, and Swinburne spent a lot of time alone as a child. Lesbia's suicide mirrors Swinburne's sister Edith's death. Leonard Shengold, a psychiatrist focused on child abuse, calls Bertie an "obvious stand-in for the author." Furthermore, there may be some evidence that Swinburne himself had incestuous feelings for his cousin Mary Gordon (whom the character of Lesbia Brandon was likely based on); he never married and reportedly became depressed after she did.

=== Masochism ===
Swinburne likely took inspiration from the works of Marquis de Sade, and it is known that he read several of de Sade's books before writing Lesbia Brandon. In fact, much of de Sade's Justine can be related to Lesbia Brandon. It was also well known that Swinburne had a interest in flagellation, likely first developed through his time at Eton College. James Leigh Joynes, his Eton tutor, likely flogged him for disciplinary reasons.

This obsession with physical pain is manifested in the novel; Lesbia Brandon contains many sections that describe whipping or other physical punishments in minute detail. Many of the characters imply their enjoyment of being flogged. Although he does not initially like it, Bertie eventually takes sexual pleasure in being flogged by Denham, his tutor, and Denham takes sexual pleasure in administering the punishment.

=== Incest ===
Incest is a major motif of the book. Much of the characters are related, whether they know so or not, yet pursue sexual and/or romantic relationships with one another. Bertie and Maggie Seyton are full siblings, a fact known to them. The Seytons are half-siblings to Denham through their shared father, Frederick Seyton, whom they aren't aware had an affair that led to Denham. Lesbia is Denham's half-sibling through their shared mother. Denham's mother married Lord Brandon after giving birth to Denham.

These biological relationships do not impede sexual ones in Lesbia Brandon. Bertie describes sexual feelings towards his elder sister Maggie, and Maggie and Bertie later share a kiss that almost results in fornication. Later, Maggie has an affair with Denham before knowing he is her brother. Denham and Bertie both receive sexual pleasure from Denham's flagellation of Bertie. Lesbia is the only character who does not engage in explicit incest.

Lesbia Brandon family and relationship tree

Unnamed mother	Frederick Seyton		Lady Brandon	Lord Brandon
Lady Margaret	Bertie Seyton	Denham		Lesbia Brandon

=== Gender identity ===
A key feature of Bertie's character is his femininity. Denham, his tutor, says that Bertie "ought to have been a pretty and rather boyish girl" and compares his likeness to his elder sister Maggie. Lesbia Brandon can also be interpreted as non-gender conforming to some degree. Lesbia is a masculine woman who writes poetry from a man's perspective and is frequently compared to Sappho. Her childhood caretaker says that Lesbia always wanted to be a boy. Researchers describe Bertie and Lesbia as foils of one another with respect to gender identity.

=== The sea ===
The sea is a major theme throughout the novel; Bertie describes a strong affinity towards it. Some suggest that Swinburne used the sea as a symbol of a womb, others that it is a symbol of femininity. The sea is symbolized as both a feminine force, as well as a dangerous presence. Swinburne draws a parallel between being whipped for punishment and being "whipped" by the waves. Like many parts of the novel, the sea is sexualized. According to an article in Victorian Popular Fictions, the sea acts as a "femme fatale" character.

== Publication ==
Lesbia Brandon eventually appeared in print for the first time in 1952, published by British Book Center and edited by Randolph Hughes. It sold for $7.50. During writing, Swinburne had not kept the pages in a particular order, and Hughues had to reorganize the manuscript into chronological order. Some of the chapters are still missing, and only 8 of the 17 chapters have the titles Swinburne gave them.

Some believed that the 1952 edition was a forgery at first, given T. J. Wise's untrustworthy reputation. The poet Alfred Noyes, who personally knew Swinburne, claimed that some passages were genuine and others faked. Chatto & Windus, Swinburne's publishers, did not have any record of the manuscript. Despite the controversy, Hughes stood by the book as a genuine product of Swinburne's repertoire.

A second edition was published in 1962, edited this time by Edmund Wilson, in a version combined with Swinburne's Love's Cross-currents.

== Reception ==
After its publication in 1952, nearly a century after it had originally been written, Lesbia Brandon was still somewhat controversial. In a 1964 review, David Daiches calls the novel "wholly preposterous" and "rather offensive nonsense." Daiches goes on to criticize the incestuous relationships and excessive masochism. He recommends the book only to students of Swinbourne's mind, and not as a piece of fiction in its own right.

Other criticisms of the novel come from its incompleteness. Parts of the manuscript are lost and the result is a story that is somewhat confusing and incomplete. American author Marion Zimmer Bradley calls Lesbia Brandon "too scrappy to judge". In a review for the New York Times, Herbert F. West called it "fragmentary" and was unable to form an opinion on its quality.
