= Waiting for the Verdict =

Painting by Abraham Solomon

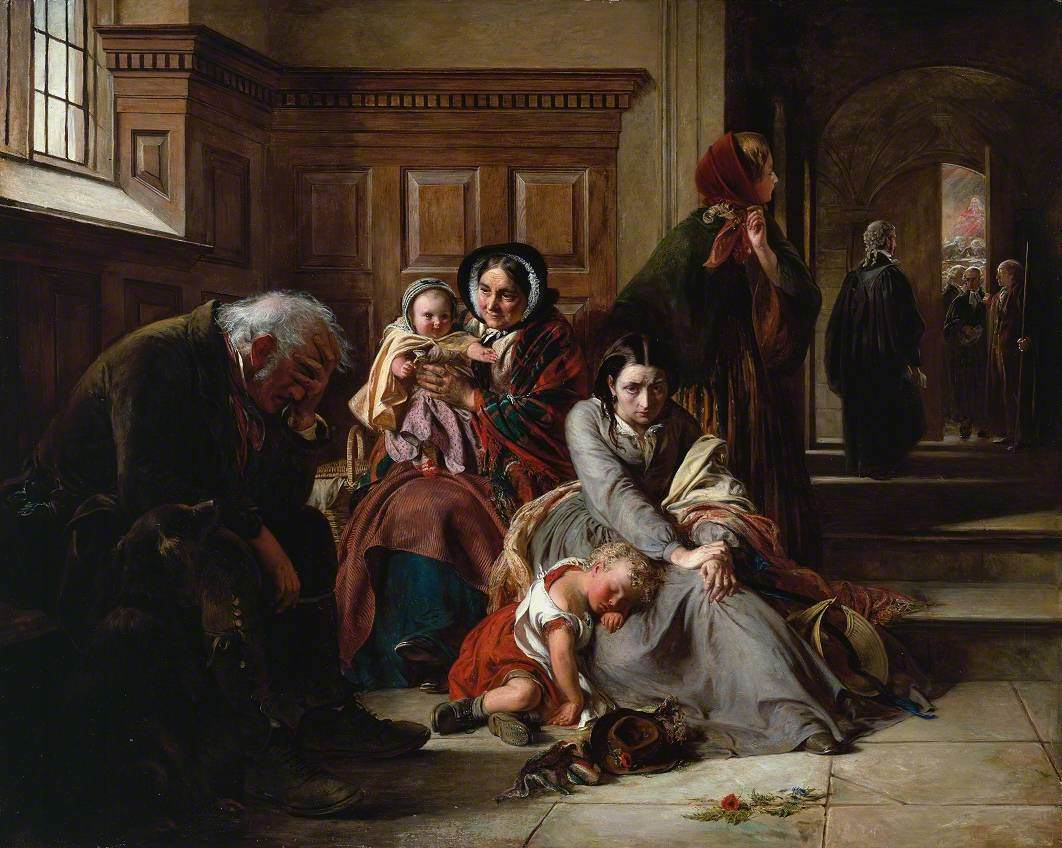
- Artist: Abraham Solomon
- Year: 1857
- Type: Oil on canvas, genre painting
- Dimensions: 101.9 cm × 127.3 cm (40.1 in × 50.1 in)
- Location: Tate Britain, London

Waiting for the Verdict is an 1857 oil painting by the British artist Abraham Solomon. A genre painting it depicts a family waiting anxiously outside a courtroom for news of the verdict. It dwells on the absence of the accused who is father, husband and son to those gathered.

The painting was displayed at the Royal Academy Exhibition of 1857 held at the National Gallery and again at the International Exhibition of 1862 in South Kensington. It is now in the collection of the Tate Britain in Pimlico, which purchased it in 1983. Solomon produced a sequel painting Not Guilty in 1859.

== Bibliography ==
- Fletcher, Pamela. The Victorian Painting of Modern Life. Taylor & Francis, 2024.
- Gledhill, Christine. Reframing British Cinema 1918-1928: Between Restraint and Passion. British Film Institute, 2003.
- Meisel, Martin. Realizations: Narrative, Pictorial, and Theatrical Arts in Nineteenth-Century England. Princeton University Press 2014.
