= Naukydes of Argos =

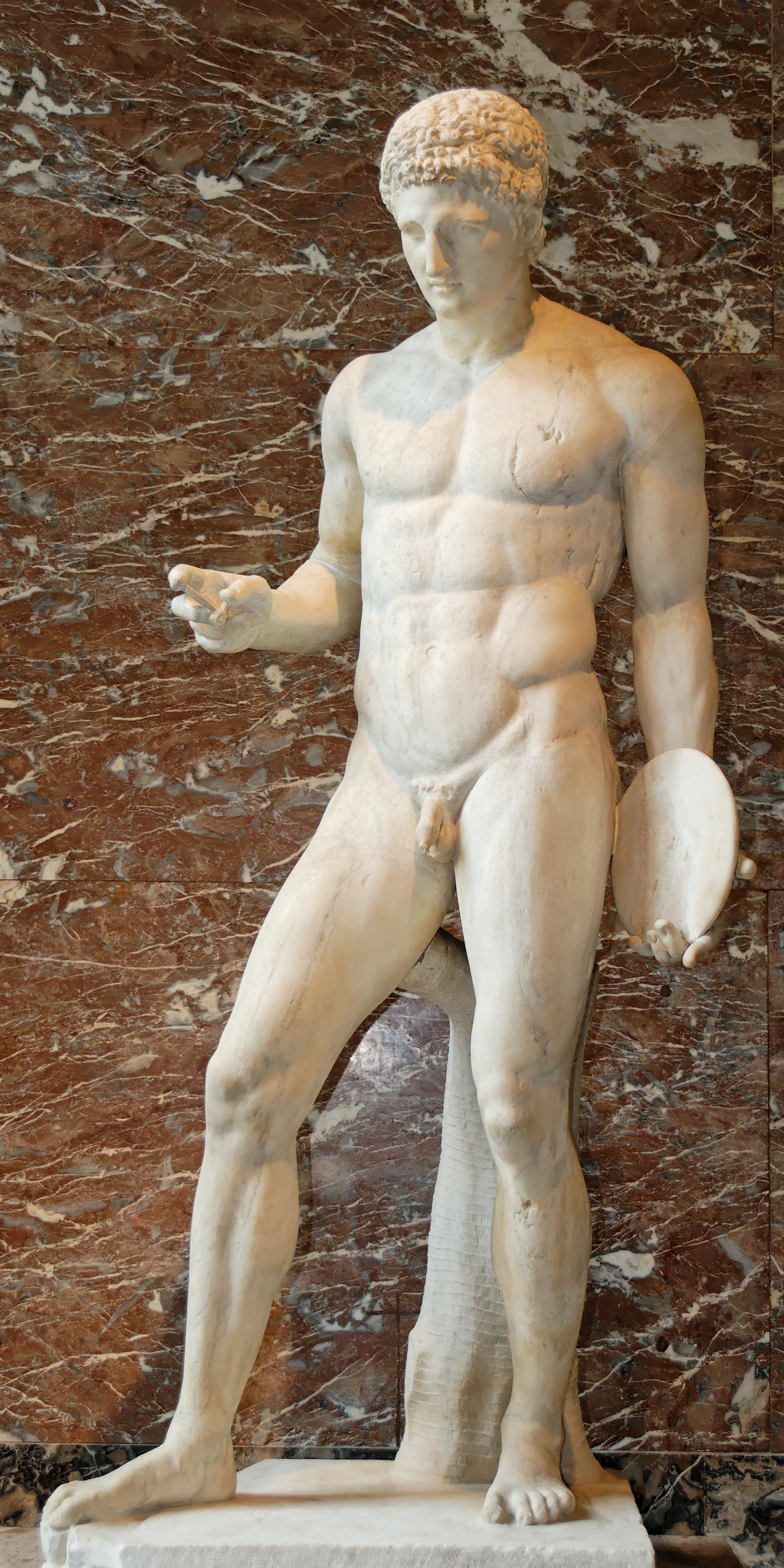
Discophoros, modeled after Naukydes.

Naukydes of Argos (4th century BCE) was a Greek sculptor from Argos.

Taught under Polykleitos, he created a statue of gold and ivory of Hebe for the temple of Hera in Argos; also, statues of Hecate, Hermes, of the poet Erinna, and Phrixus. The discobolus of Naukydes was identified by Ennio Quirino Visconti, as mentioned by Pliny.

He eventually became teacher to Polykleitos the Younger, son of his old teacher.
