= Sappho 94 =

Fragment of poem written by Sappho

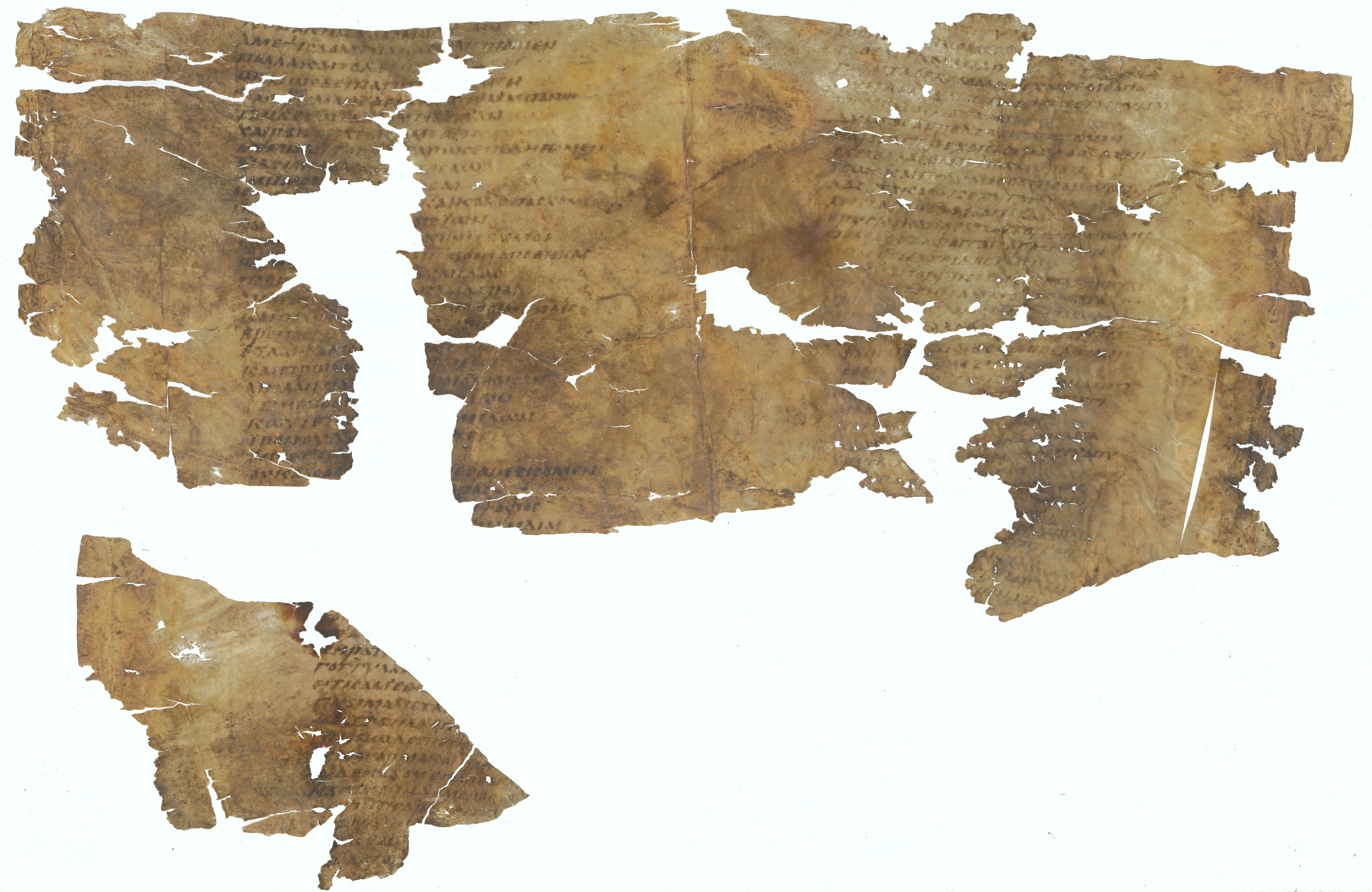
P. Berol. 9722, the parchment on which Sappho 94 is preserved.

Sappho 94, sometimes known as Sappho's Confession, is a fragment of a poem by the archaic Greek poet Sappho. The poem is written as a conversation between Sappho and a woman who is leaving her, perhaps in order to marry, and describes a series of memories of their time together. It survives on a sixth-century AD scrap of parchment. Scholarship on the poem has focused on whether the initial surviving lines of the poem are spoken by Sappho or the departing woman, and on the interpretation of the eighth stanza, possibly the only mention of homosexual activities in the surviving Sapphic corpus.

== Preservation ==
The poem was one of a group (Sappho 92–97) preserved on a sixth-century piece of parchment discovered in Egypt. This parchment, P. Berol. 9722, was probably originally part of a book. The parchment is 12 cm high (though the page was originally about twice this height) and 43.5 cm wide, and consists of a double-page spread with a third page sewn to the right hand side. The page on which Sappho 94 is preserved is 16 cm wide. It is part of the collection of the Egyptian Museum of Berlin, which acquired it in 1896, a gift of a Dr Reinhardt, then the German vice-consul in Bushehr. It was first published by Wilhelm Schubart in 1902.

Parts of ten stanzas of the poem are preserved, though only twelve lines are complete. Only two lines of the first stanza of the poem are preserved, showing that at least one line – the first of that stanza – is missing. It is unknown whether the poem originally had further stanzas either before or after the surviving portion. (Note: The first surviving stanza is frequently assumed to be the original first stanza. Anne Pippin Burnett says that this is "simply because critics like to think of them that way".)

== Poem ==
=== Content ===
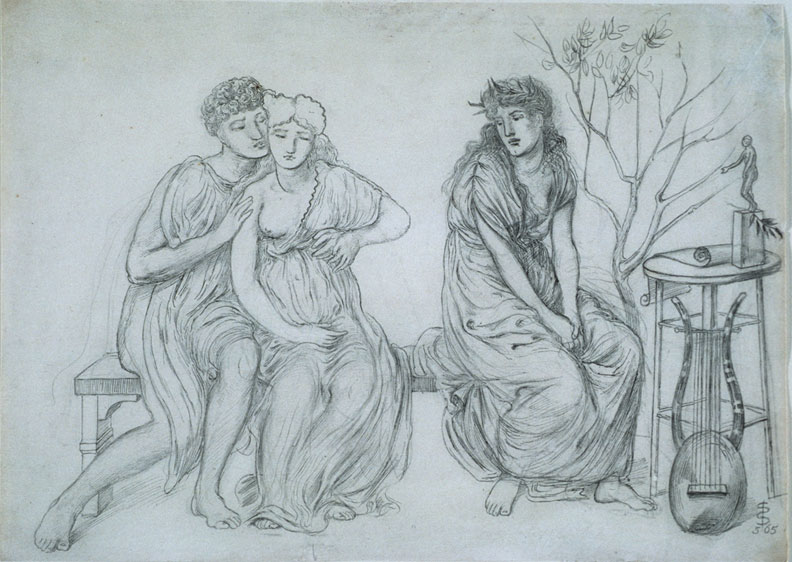
Simeon Solomon, Erinna Taken from Sappho (1865). In the 19th century, the poet Erinna was believed to be a contemporary of Sappho. Here she is shown leaving Sappho, just as the woman in fragment 94 does.

The poem is composed in stanzas of three lines, the first two glyconic and the third glyconic with dactylic expansion. That is, the first two lines of each stanza are of the form "× × ¯ ˘ ˘ ¯ ˘ ¯", and the third is in the form "× × ¯ ˘ ˘ ¯ ˘ ˘ ¯ ˘ ¯", where × is an anceps (a syllable that can be long or short), ˘ is a short syllable, and ¯ is a long syllable. It was part of Book V of the Alexandrian edition of Sappho's poetry, which may have contained poems in a number of different metres based on glyconics.

The poem begins in medias res, with at least one prior line missing. The first surviving line of the fragment has either Sappho or the woman leaving her saying that they wish to be dead; as it stands, it is not possible to determine with certainty to which speaker the line should be attributed. Most scholars attribute the initial line of the poem to Sappho. On the other hand, Wilhelm Schubart, the first to edit the poem, initially thought that it was spoken by the departing woman; this is a position that has been taken up more recently by scholars such as Stephanie Larson.

The first two surviving stanzas of the poem establish the scene. Sappho describes the woman leaving her "weeping" (Note: Sappho 94.2 (Note: All translations of Sappho, unless otherwise attributed, are as given in Rayor & Lardinois 2014.)) and saying that she leaves unwillingly. In the third stanza, Sappho replies, telling the departing woman that she should "Go happily and remember me". The woman leaving Sappho is perhaps departing to marry, and the poem might be part of a group of works by Sappho associated with women's preparations for marriage.

The remaining seven stanzas of the poem consist of Sappho recalling the happy times that she has shared with the woman – Dr. Ellen Greene describes the poem from line 12 as painting a picture of "blissful satisfaction". Many commentators have interpreted this as Sappho attempting to console her departing companion; John Rauk, however, argues that the work was not intended as a poem of consolation but as a lament for Sappho's loss of her lover.

=== Interpretation ===
The poem is typical of Sappho's work, with its subject and form both characteristically Sapphic. It deals with separation from someone the poet cares about – what Benjamin Acosta-Hughes describes as Sappho's "poetry of separation and longing". This theme is also treated in several other significant fragments of Sappho, including the Ode to Aphrodite, fr. 16, and fr. 31. The form of the poem – structured as a conversation Sappho has had – has parallels in the Ode to Aphrodite, and probably fragments including Sappho 95.

Sappho's linking of love and death in this poem is a common trope of lyric poetry. Along with fragment 94, Sappho herself uses the conceit in fragment 31 ("to myself I seem needing but little to die" (Note: Sappho 31.15-16)) and fragment 95 ("a longing to die holds me" (Note: Sappho 95.8)). Stephanie Larson compares this longing for death at the absence of a beloved in Sappho to Penelope's longing for death in the Odyssey – though where Penelope has already been separated from her husband for 20 years, Sappho and her beloved are only just about to separate.

The eighth stanza of the poem has been subject of much scholarly debate – along with the identity of the speaker in the first paragraph, Margaret Williamson describes it as one of the two key points of uncertainty in the text. This reads:

and on soft beds
... delicate...
you quenched your desire.

The lines may be the only clear reference to homosexual activity in the preserved fragments of Sappho. Not all commentators agree with this, however; Larson notes that scholars "have made every attempt" to "explain away the overt sexuality" of the lines. One suggestion, originating with Ulrich von Wilamowitz-Moellendorff, is that the poem is referring to satisfying the departing woman's desire for sleep.

Sappho 94 has sympotic overtones, containing references to garlands, flowers, sweet oils, and soft beds, all of which are images associated with the symposium – an ancient Greek drinking party, which was accompanied by entertainment, including music and dance. Because of this, Ewen Bowie argues that the poem may have been one of those which was commonly performed at ancient symposia. The same images are also found in the world of female ritual, however. André Lardinois observes that they could describe the activities of a chorus of women culminating in a performance at a holy site ("no holy site... we left uncovered, no grove... dance"), and Margaret Williamson interprets the final section of the poem as discussing the same kind of religious practice as that in Sappho 2.

== Works cited ==
- Acosta-Hughes, Benjamin (2010). Arion's Lyre: Archaic Lyric into Hellenistic Poetry. Princeton: Princeton University Press.
- "Berliner Papyrusdatenbank" (in German). Staatlichten Museen der Berlin.
- Bowie, Ewen (2016). "How Did Sappho's Songs Get into the Male Sympotic Repertoire?". In Bierl, Anton; Lardinois, André (eds.). The Newest Sappho: P. Sapph. Obbink and P. GC inv. 105, frs.1–4. Leiden: Brill. ISBN 978-90-04-31483-2.
- Burnett, Anne (1979). "Desire and Memory (Sappho Frag. 94)". Classical Philology. 74 (1): 16–27. doi:10.1086/366465. S2CID 162064287.
- Campbell, David A., ed. (1982). Greek Lyric I: Sappho and Alcaeus. Cambridge, Massachusetts: Harvard University Press.
- Greene, Ellen (1996). "Sappho, Foucault, and Women's Erotics". Arethusa. 29 (1): 1–14. doi:10.1353/are.1996.0004. S2CID 162611608.
- Harris, William M. "Sappho: The Greek Poems" (PDF). Middlebury College. Archived (PDF) from the original on 1 December 2016.
- Lardinois, André (1994). "Subject and Circumstance in Sappho's Poetry". Transactions of the American Philological Association. 124: 57–84. doi:10.2307/284286. JSTOR 284286.
- Larson, Stephanie (2010). "τεθνακην δ' αδολως θελω: Reading Sappho's "Confession" (fr.94) through Penelope". Mnemosyne. 63 (2). doi:10.1163/156852510x456129.
- Lanata, Giulia (1996). "Sappho's Amatory Language". In Greene, Ellen (ed.). Reading Sappho: Contemporary Approaches. Berkeley: University of California Press.
- McEvilly, Thomas (1971). "Sappho, Fragment Ninety-Four". Phoenix. 25 (1): 1–11. doi:10.2307/1087377. JSTOR 1087377.
- Rauk, John (1989). "Erinna's Distaff and Sappho Fr.94". Greek, Roman, and Byzantine Studies. 30 (1).
- Rayor, Diane; Lardinois, André (2014). Sappho: A New Translation of the Complete Works. Cambridge: Cambridge University Press.
- Robbins, Emmet (1990). "Who's Dying in Sappho Fr. 94?". Phoenix. 44 (2): 111–121. doi:10.2307/1088325. JSTOR 1088325.
- Schubart, W. (1902). "Neue Bruchstüke der Sappho und des Alkaios". Sitzungberichte der Königlich Preussischen Akademie der Wissenschaften zu Berlin (in German). 10.
- Tsantsanoglou, Kyriakos (2020). "The 'Cycle' of Arignota: Sappho's frr. 95 and 96". Trends in Classics. 12 (2): 203–227. doi:10.1515/tc-2020-0015. S2CID 227218234.
- Williamson, Margaret (1995). Sappho's Immortal Daughters. Cambridge, MA: Harvard University Press.
