= Antiphanes of Macedon =

Antiphanes (Ancient Greek: Ἀντιφάνης) of Macedon is the author of ten epigrams in the Greek Anthology; one of these is headed as Antiphanes of Megalopolis and may be by another poet.

He lived after the time of Meleager (that is, after 100 BCE), but before the time of Philip of Thessalonica, that is, about the reign of the Roman emperor Augustus; for Philip incorporated the epigrams of Antiphanes in his Anthology, by which means they have come down to our times.

== Notes ==
=== Other sources ===
- Poems from the Greek Anthology in English Paraphrase Page 45 By Dudley Fitts, Anthologia Graeca Selections ISBN 0-313-21017-9
- Select epigrams from the Greek anthology Page 324 By John William Mackail
