= Meyer Solomon =

Michael (Meyer) Solomon was a successful Bishopsgate manufacturer, and was one of the first Jews to be admitted to the freedom of the City of London.

Solomon's family arrived in England from Europe, possibly Holland or Germany, sometime at the end of the eighteenth century. His wife's name was Catherine (Kate) Levy, and he was the father of eight children. Three of these—Abraham, Rebecca, and Simeon—became notable painters, their other children were named Aaron, Betsy, Isaac, Ellen, and Sylvester.

Solomon lived in a well established Jewish community in No. 3 Sandys Street, Bishopsgate, London, and his considerable wealth allowed him to be accepted by London society while maintaining their heritage. His business concern was as a manufacturer of Leghorn hats.

Solomon was a freemason, having joined the Premier Grand Lodge of England.
