= Simeon Solomon =

British artist (1840–1905)

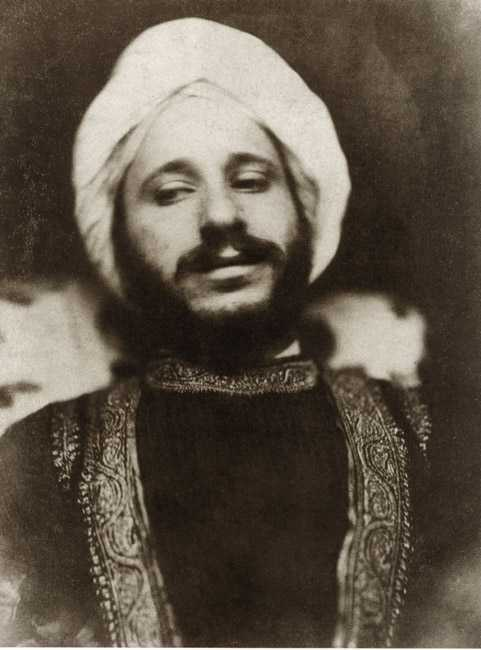
- Simeon Solomon in Oriental costume, a photograph by David Wilkie Wynfield
- Born: 9 October 1840; London, England, UK
- Died: 14 August 1905 (aged 64); St Giles, London, England, UK
- Education: Carey's Art Academy (1852); Royal Academy, London
- Known for: Painter
- Movement: Pre-Raphaelite; Orientalist

Simeon Solomon (9 October 1840 – 14 August 1905) was a British painter associated with the Pre-Raphaelites who was noted for his depictions of Jewish life and same-sex desire. His career was cut short as a result of public scandal following his arrests and convictions for attempted sodomy in 1873 and 1874.

== Biography ==
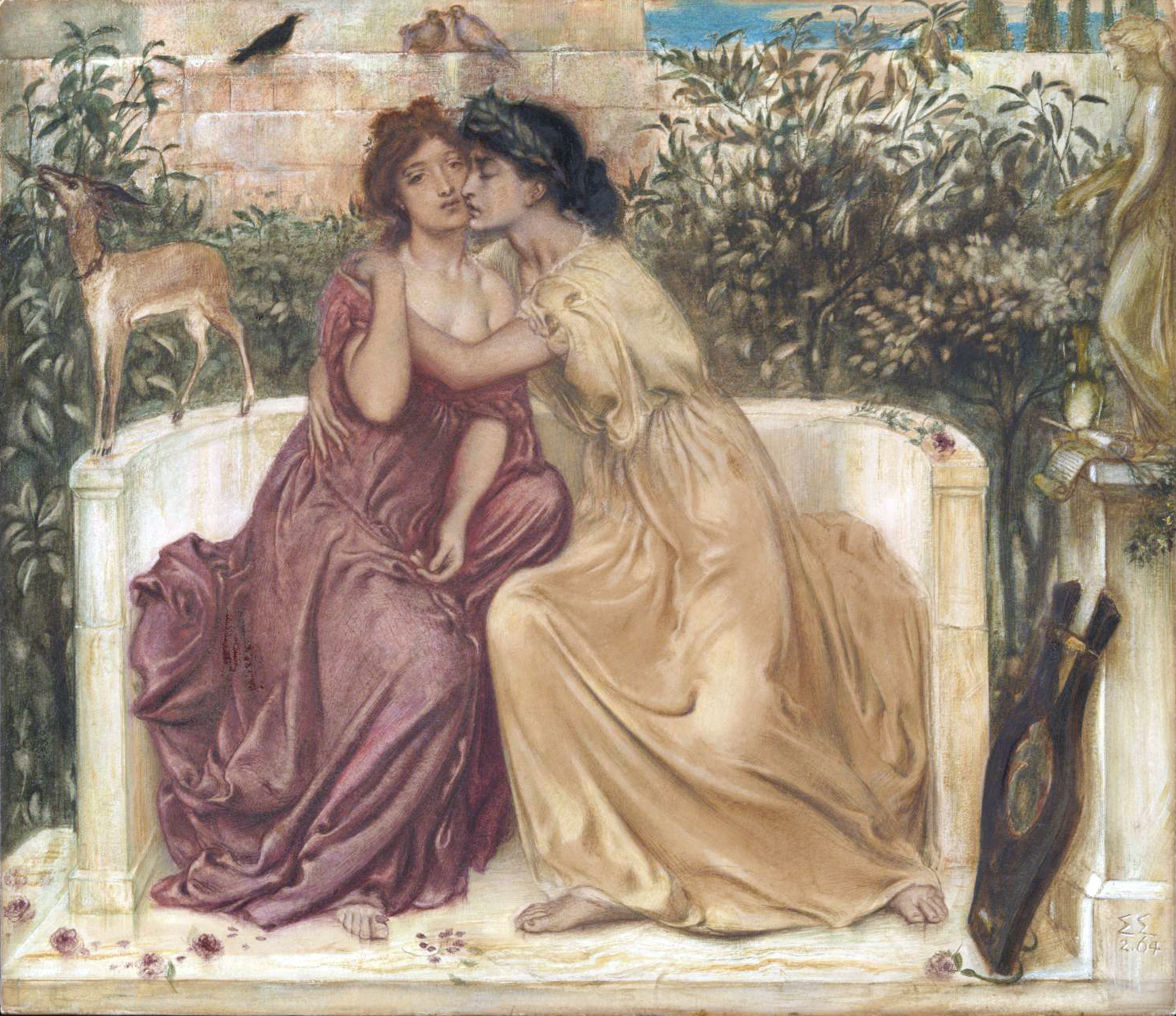
Sappho and Erinna in a Garden at Mytilene, 1864 Watercolour on paper, Tate Britain

Solomon was born into a prominent Jewish family. He was the eighth and last child born to merchant Michael (Meyer) Solomon and artist Catherine (Kate) Levy. Solomon was a younger brother to fellow painters Abraham Solomon (1824–1862) and Rebecca Solomon (1832–1886).

Born and educated in London, Solomon started receiving lessons in painting from his older brother around 1850. He started attending Carey's Art Academy in 1852. His older sister first exhibited her works at the Royal Academy during the same year.

As a student at the Royal Academy Schools, Solomon was introduced through Dante Gabriel Rossetti to other members of the Pre-Raphaelite circle, as well as the poet Algernon Charles Swinburne and the painter Edward Burne-Jones in 1857. His first exhibition was at the Royal Academy in 1858. He continued to hold exhibitions of his work at the Royal Academy between 1858 and 1872. In addition to the literary paintings favoured by the Pre-Raphaelite school, Solomon's subjects often included scenes from the Hebrew Bible and genre paintings depicting Jewish life and rituals. He produced illustrations for Swinburne's controversial novel Lesbia Brandon in 1865.

In 1871 he commissioned a private printing of a prose poem of his own composition, A Vision of Love Revealed in Sleep. A contemporary reviewer in The Jewish Chronicle described it as "an account (with episodes) of a series of progressive manifestations of embodied love, seen through the medium of a trance", entirely "devoted to the glorification of pure Love ... perfect, peaceful, and passionless". The reviewer was pleased to find the text "imbued throughout with the spirit of religious belief and reverence". He assured the reader that "there is not a sentence in it which could raise a blush to the cheek of the often quoted 'young person', for whose moral welfare reviewers are so solicitous." Solomon distributed most of the copies to his friends; surviving copies are rare.

In 1873, Solomon was arrested for soliciting in public toilets and having sex with a 60-year-old stableman named George Roberts. Both men were charged with indecent exposure and an attempt to commit buggery. Both were found guilty, fined £100 and sentenced to 18 months hard labour. Solomon was arrested again in 1874 in Paris on a similar charge, after which he was sentenced to spend three months in prison.

In the 1880s and 1890s, after his prosecutions, he was unable to support himself and suffered from alcoholism. He no longer exhibited, but continued to produce artworks. He spent several stints in the St. Giles Workhouse. During this time Solomon was supported by his family, and friends, including Frederick Hollyer who produced reproductions of Solomon's work.

On 14 August 1905, he died from complications brought on by his alcoholism. He was buried at the Jewish Cemetery in Willesden.

His work was collected by such figures as Oscar Wilde, John Addington Symonds, Count Eric Stenbock, and Walter Pater.

Examples of his work are on permanent display at the Victoria and Albert Museum, at Wightwick Manor in Wolverhampton, and at Leighton House in west London. Retrospectives of his work were held at the Birmingham Museum and Art Gallery in 2005–6 and at the Ben Uri Gallery (London) in 2006.

== Exhibitions ==
=== 1900–1929 ===
- Paintings and Drawings by the Late Simeon Solomon, Baillie Gallery, 54 Baker St, London. 9 December 1905 – 13 January 1906
- Winter Exhibition of Works of the Old Masters and Deceased Masters of the British School, Royal Academy, London. 1 January–10 March 1906
- Exhibition of Jewish Art and Antiquities, Whitechapel Art Gallery. 7 November–16 December 1906
- Exeter Museum and Art Gallery. April 1906
- Jewish Exhibition, Gallery of Ancient and Modern Art, Berlin. 1907
- Whitechapel Art Gallery. March 1908
- Franco-British Exhibition, London. July–August 1908
- Pre-Raphaelite Painters from Collections in Lancashire, Tate Britain, London. 17 July 1913 – 28 September 1913
- National Gallery of British Art (Tate). July 1923

=== 1930–1959 ===
- Jewish Art, Ben Uri Gallery. May 1934
- Subjects of Jewish Interest, Ben Uri Gallery. December 1946

=== 1960–1989 ===
- Exhibition of English Watercolours, Leger Galleries. 1964
- Exhibition of English Watercolours 18th & 19th Century, Leger Galleries. 1965
- Exhibition of Paintings and Drawings by Simeon Solomon, Durlacher Brothers Gallery, 538 Madison Ave, NYC. In May the exhibition moved to Wellesley College, Wellesley, MA. April–May 1966
- Acquisitions of the Friends of the Art Museums of Israel, Ben Uri Gallery. March 1985
- Solomon: A family of painters—Abraham Solomon, 1823–1862, Rebecca Solomon, 1832–1886, Simeon Solomon, 1840–1905. Geffrye Museum, London, 8 November–31 December 1985; Birmingham Museum & Art Gallery, 18 January–9 March 1986

=== 1990–present ===
- From Prodigy to Outcast: Simeon Solomon, Pre-Raphaelite Artist, Jewish Museum, London. March 2001 – May 2001
- Solomon Art Exhibition, Birmingham Museums and Art Gallery. April 2002 – June 2002
- Love Revealed: Simeon Solomon and the Pre-Raphaelites, Birmingham Museum and Art Gallery. 1 October 2005 – 15 January 2006
- Waking Dreams: The Art of the Pre-Raphaelites from the Delaware Art Museum, Various Locations in the UK and USA. 19 March 2005 – 29 July 2007
- Love Revealed: Simeon Solomon and the Pre-Raphaelites, Museum Villa Stuck, Munich. 9 March–18 June 2006
- Love Revealed: Simeon Solomon and the Pre-Raphaelites, Ben Uri Gallery, The London Jewish Museum of Art. 11 September–26 November 2006
- Blake's Shadow: William Blake and his Artistic Legacy, Whitworth Art Gallery, Manchester. 26 January 2008 – 20 April 2008
- The Pre-Raphaelites and Italy, Museo d'Arte della città di Ravenna, Ravenna, Italy. 28 February 2010 – 6 June 2010
- The Pre-Raphaelites and Italy, Ashmolean Museum, Oxford. 15 September 2010 – 5 December 2010
- Queer British Art 1861–1967, Tate Britain, 5 April–1 October 2017, included seven works by Solomon and a performance of A Vision of Love Revealed in Sleep, Neil Bartlett's one-man homage to Solomon, performed 7 July 2017.

== Gallery ==
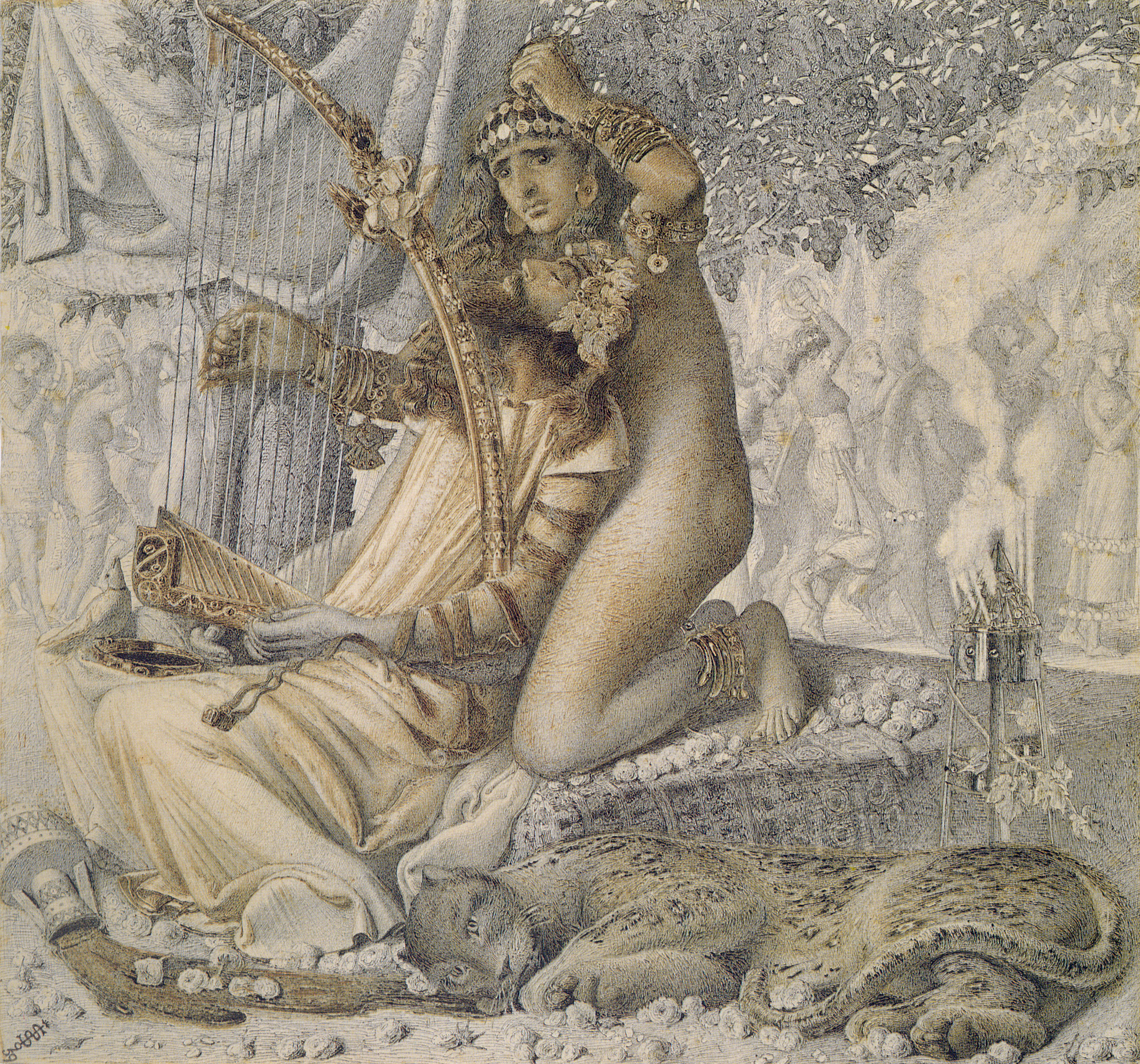
Babylon Hath Been a Golden Cup, 1859

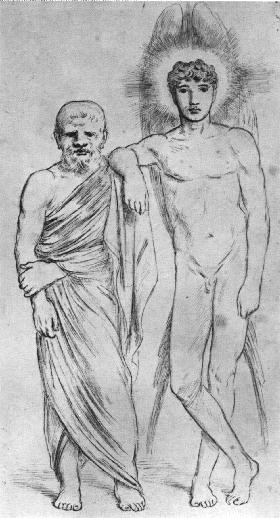
Socrates and Agathodemos, c. 1860

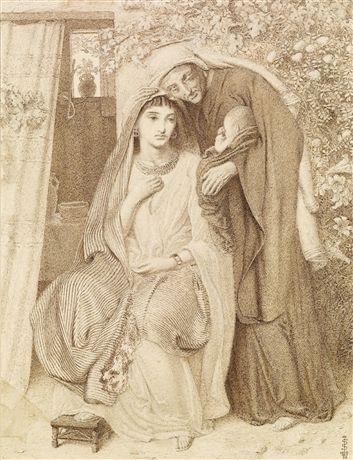
Ruth and Naomi holding the infant Obed, 1860

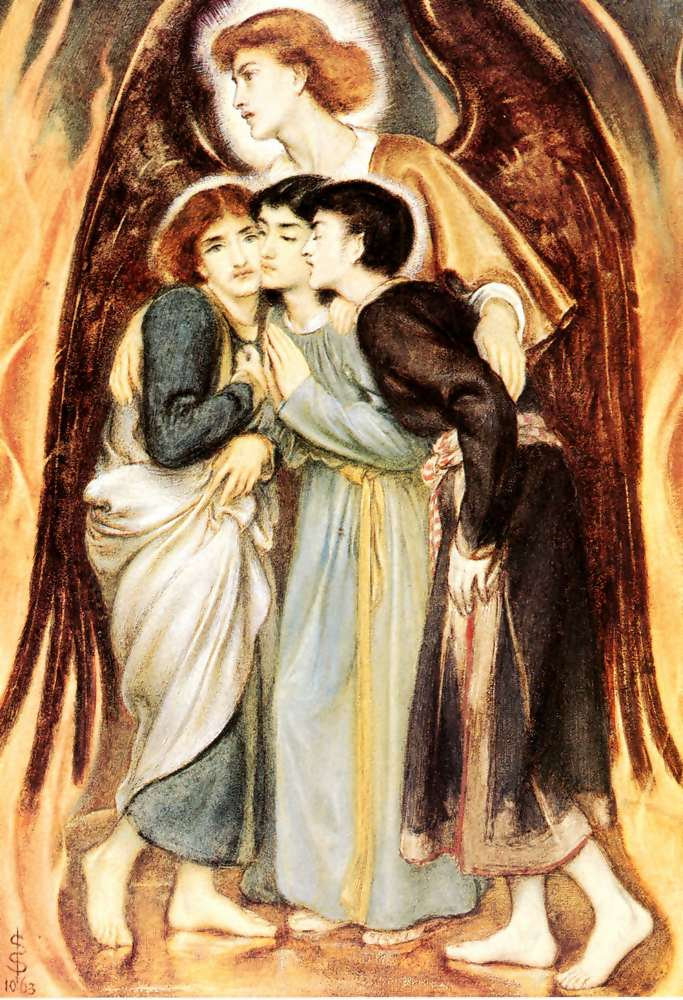
Shadrach, Meshach, and Abednego, 1863

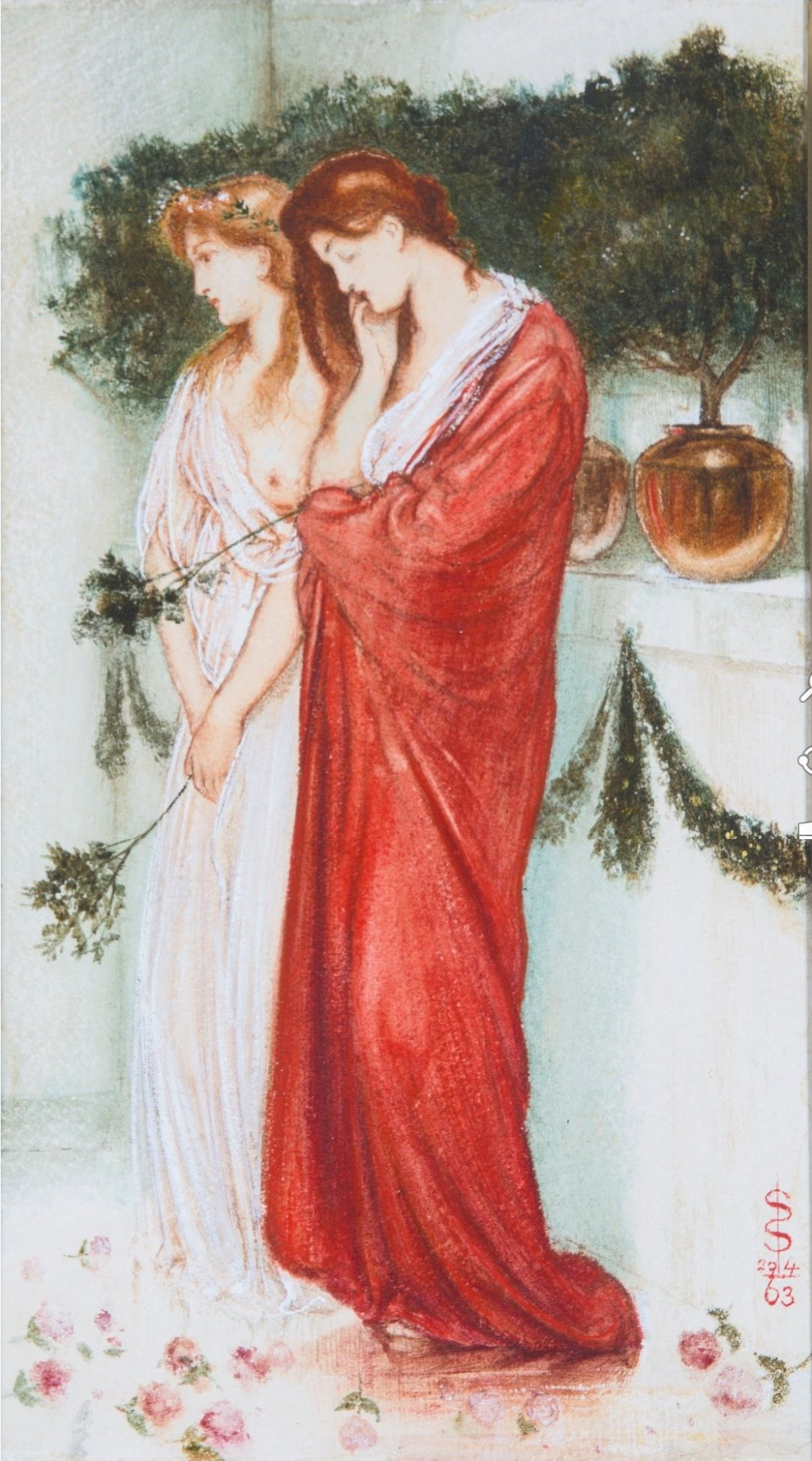
In the Temple of Venus, 1863

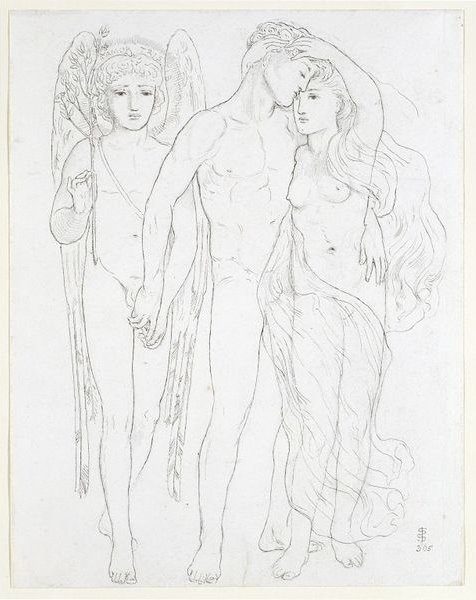
The Bride, Bridegroom and Sad Love, 1865

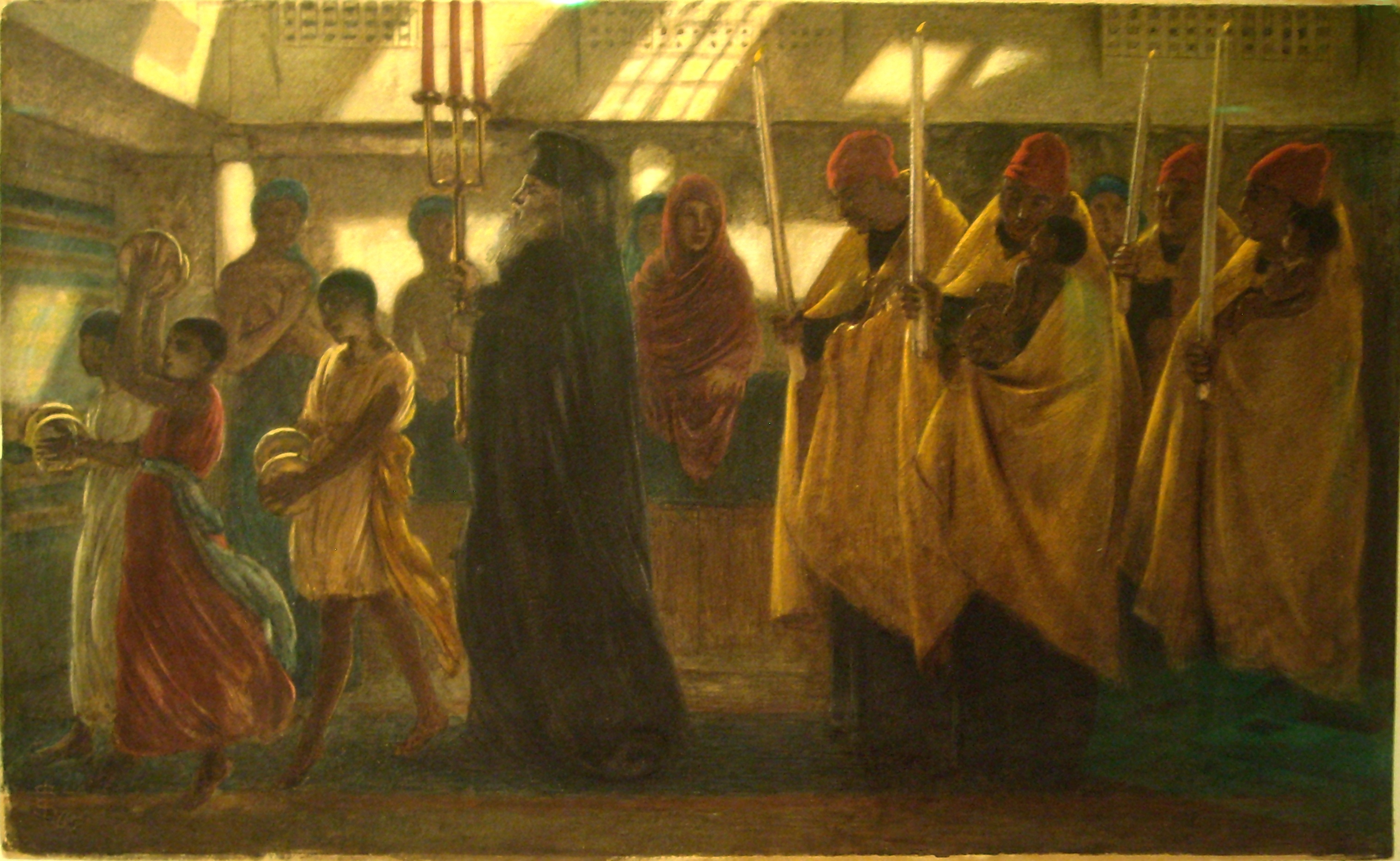
Coptic Baptismal Procession, 1865

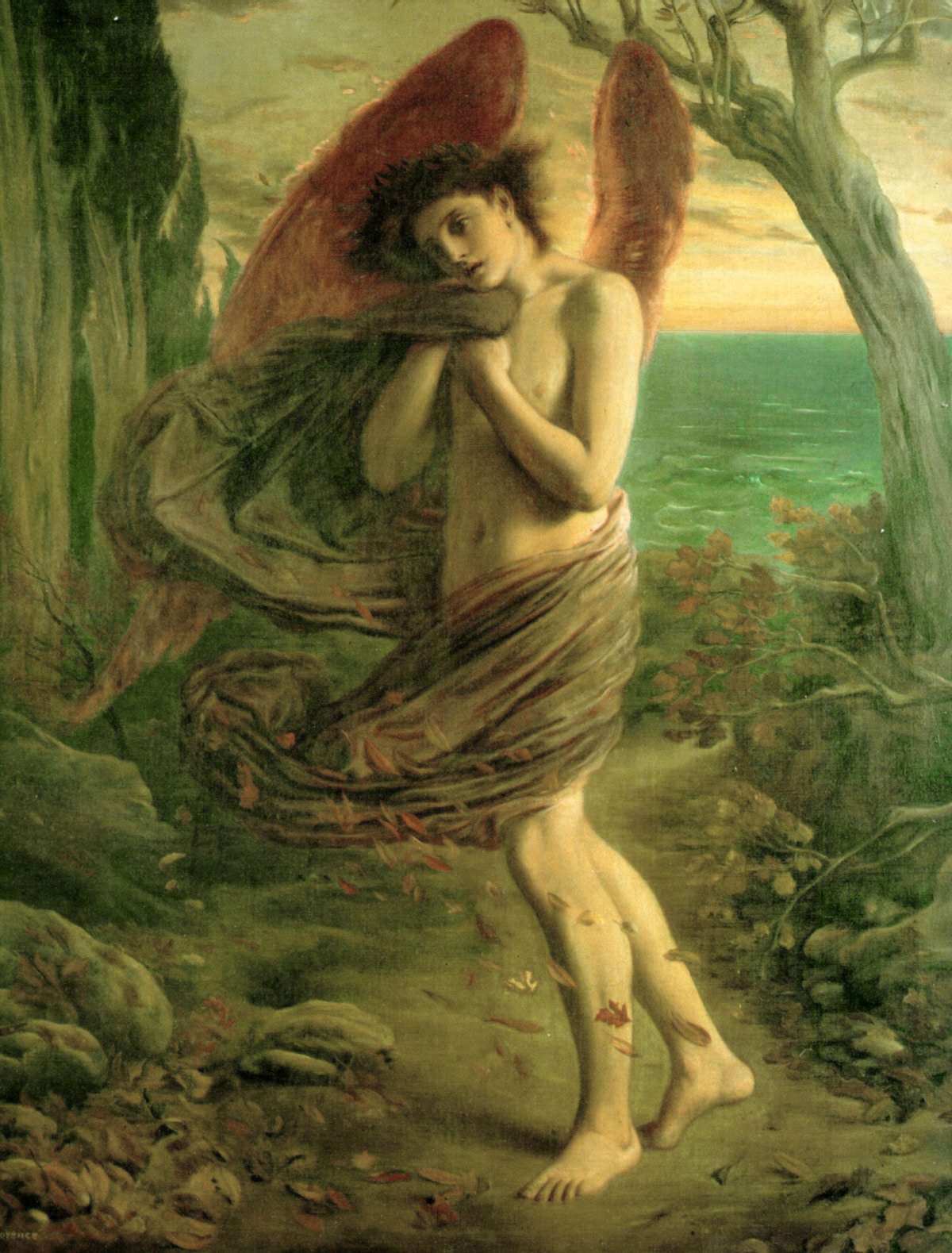
Love in Autumn, 1866

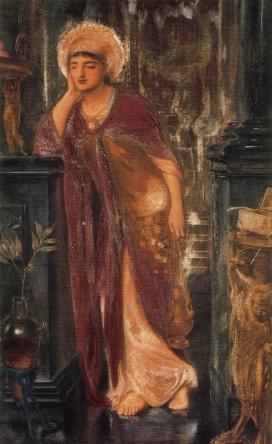
Heliogabalus, High Priest of the Sun, 1866

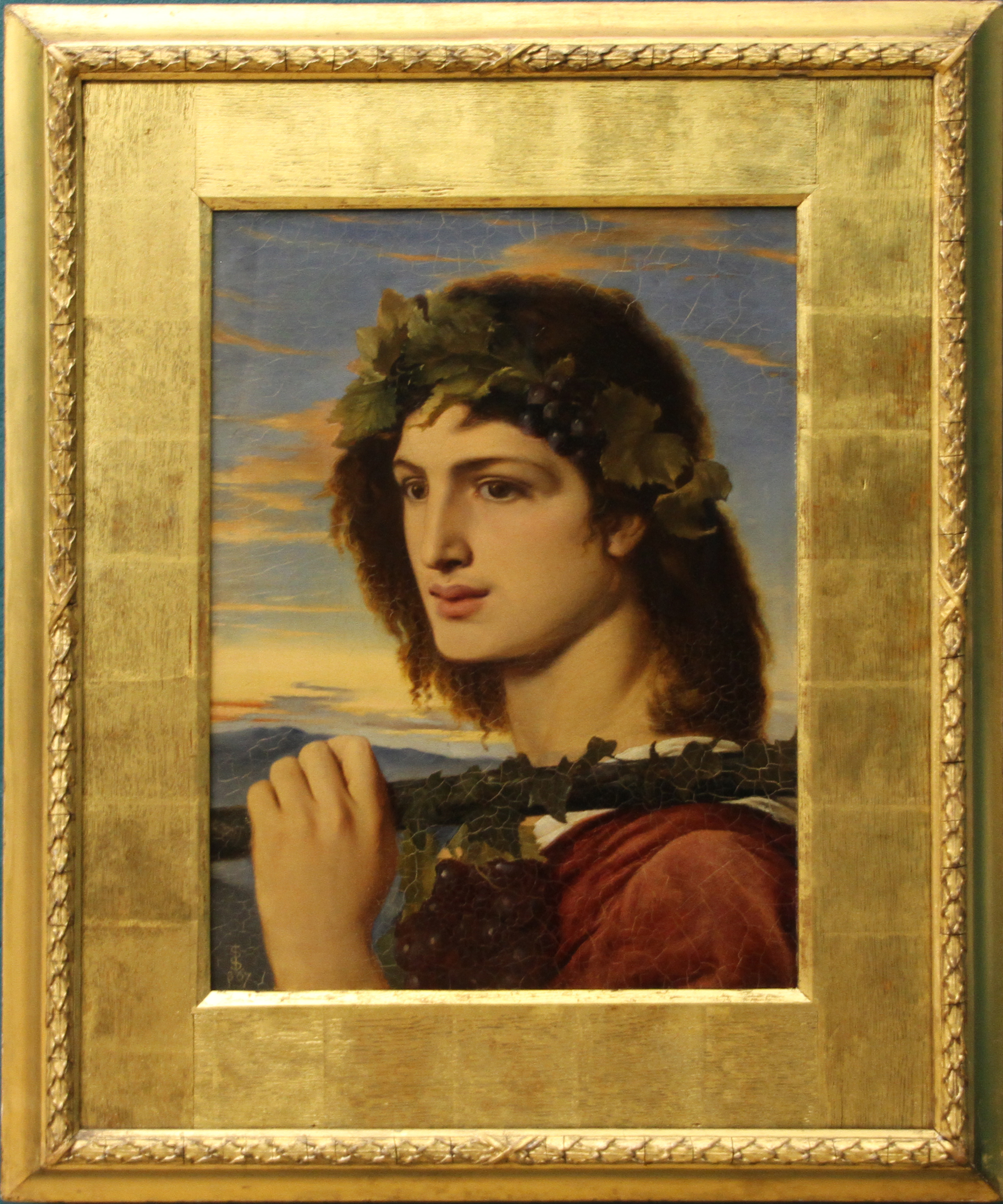
Bacchus, 1867

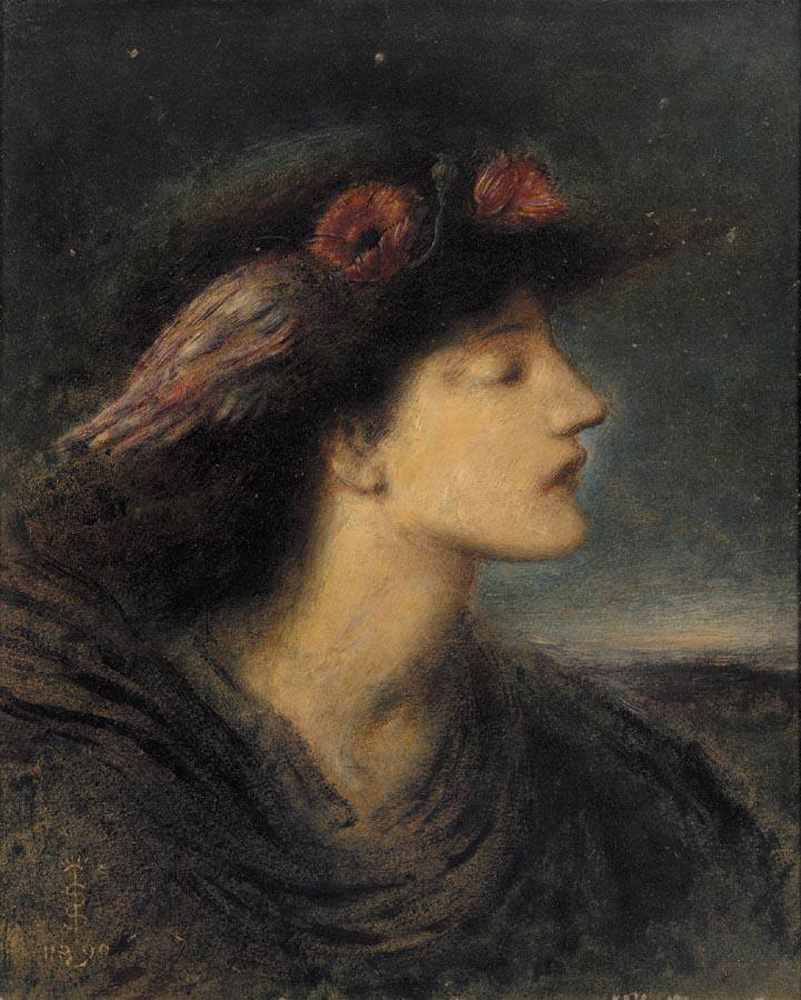
Night, 1890

== In literature ==
In Oscar Wilde's long prison letter to Lord Alfred Douglas, De Profundis, Wilde writes of his bankruptcy: "That all my charming things were to be sold: my Burne-Jones drawings: my Whistler drawings: my Monticelli: my Simeon Solomons: my china: my Library…"

== References and sources ==
Sources

- Geoffrey Wigoder, "Everyman's Judaica: an encyclopedic dictionary", Keter Publishing House Jerusalem, 1975, ISBN 978-0-7065-1412-4, p. 562
