= Diamond Jubilee of Elizabeth II =

60th anniversary of the monarch's accession

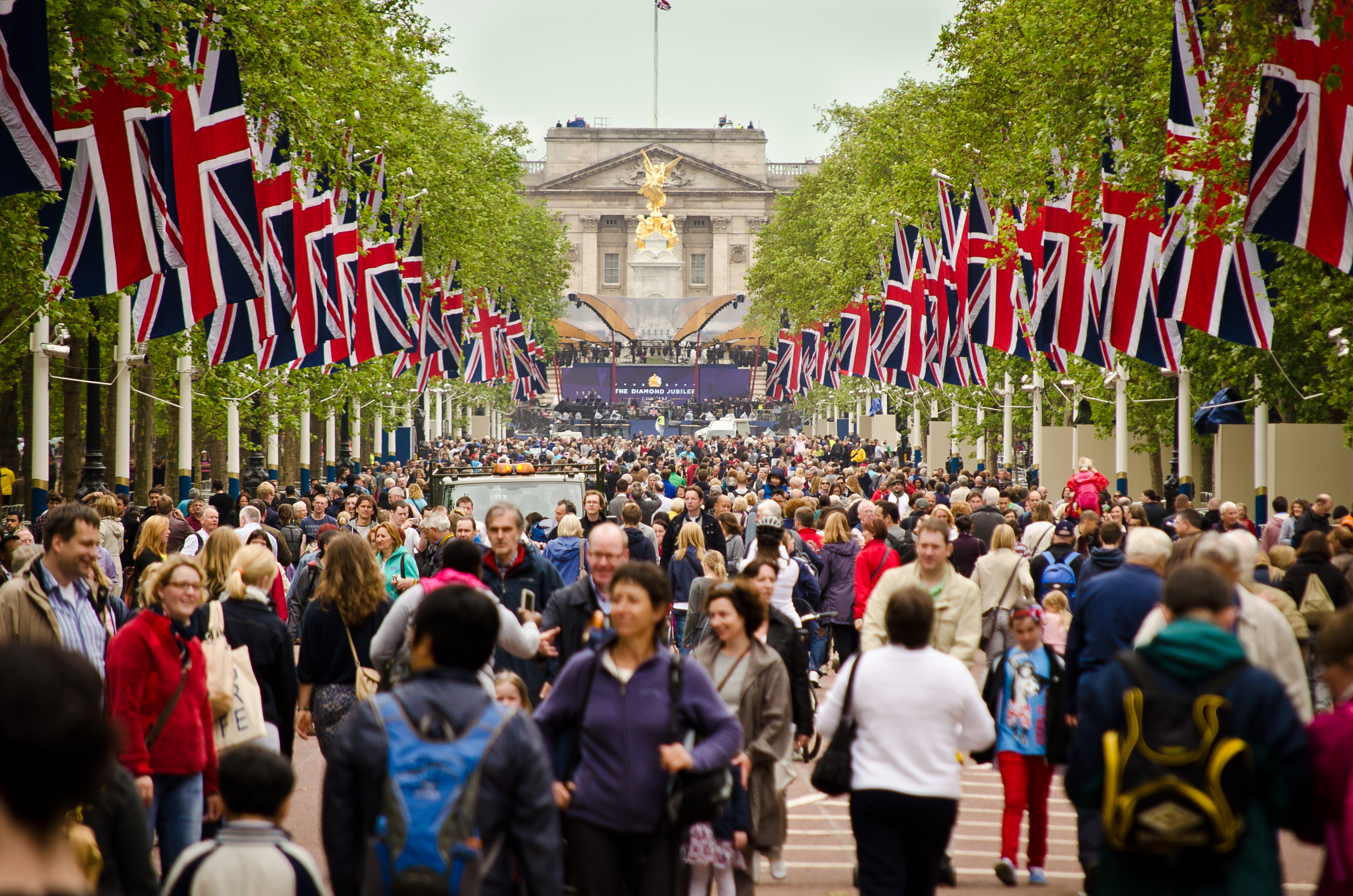
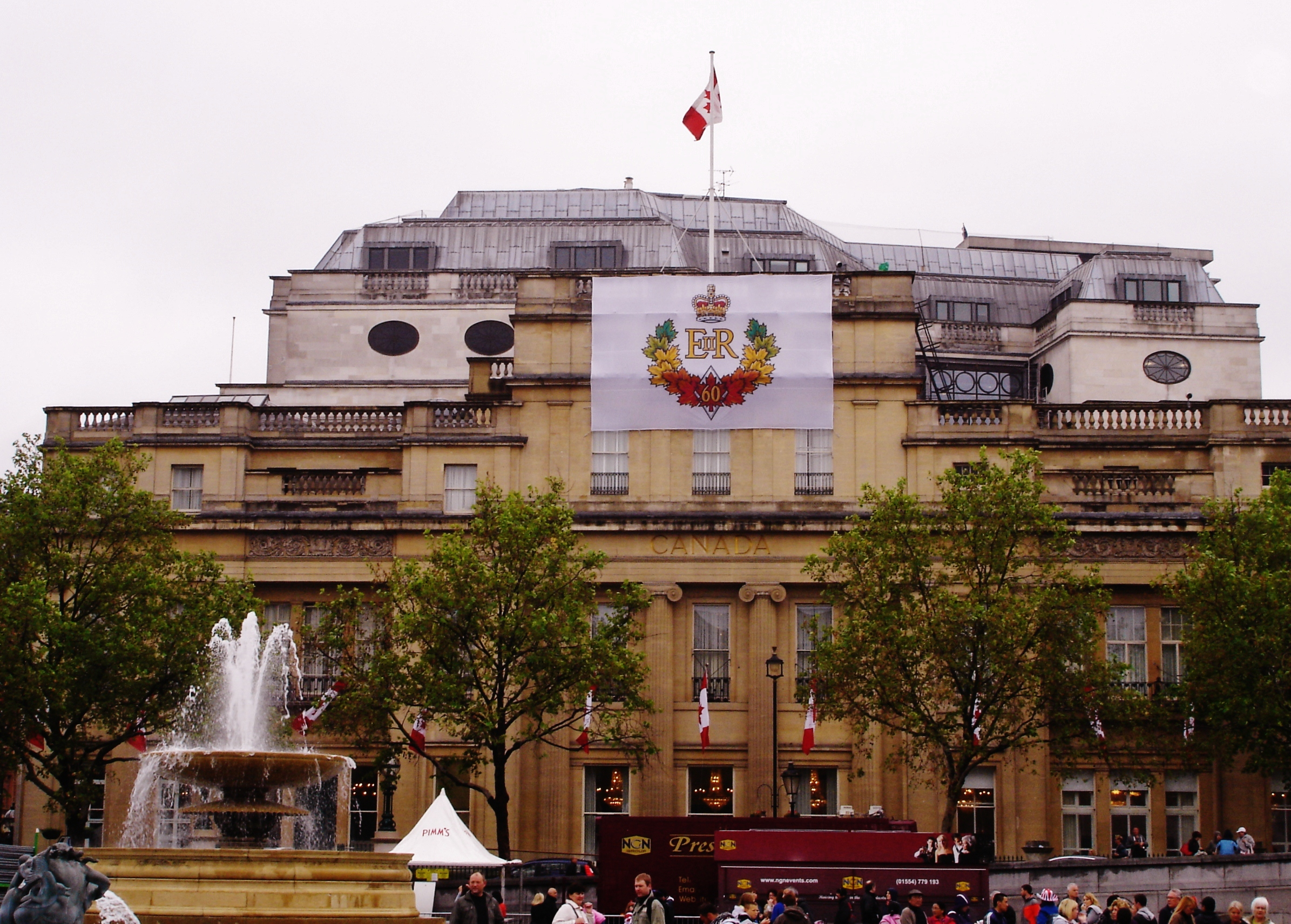
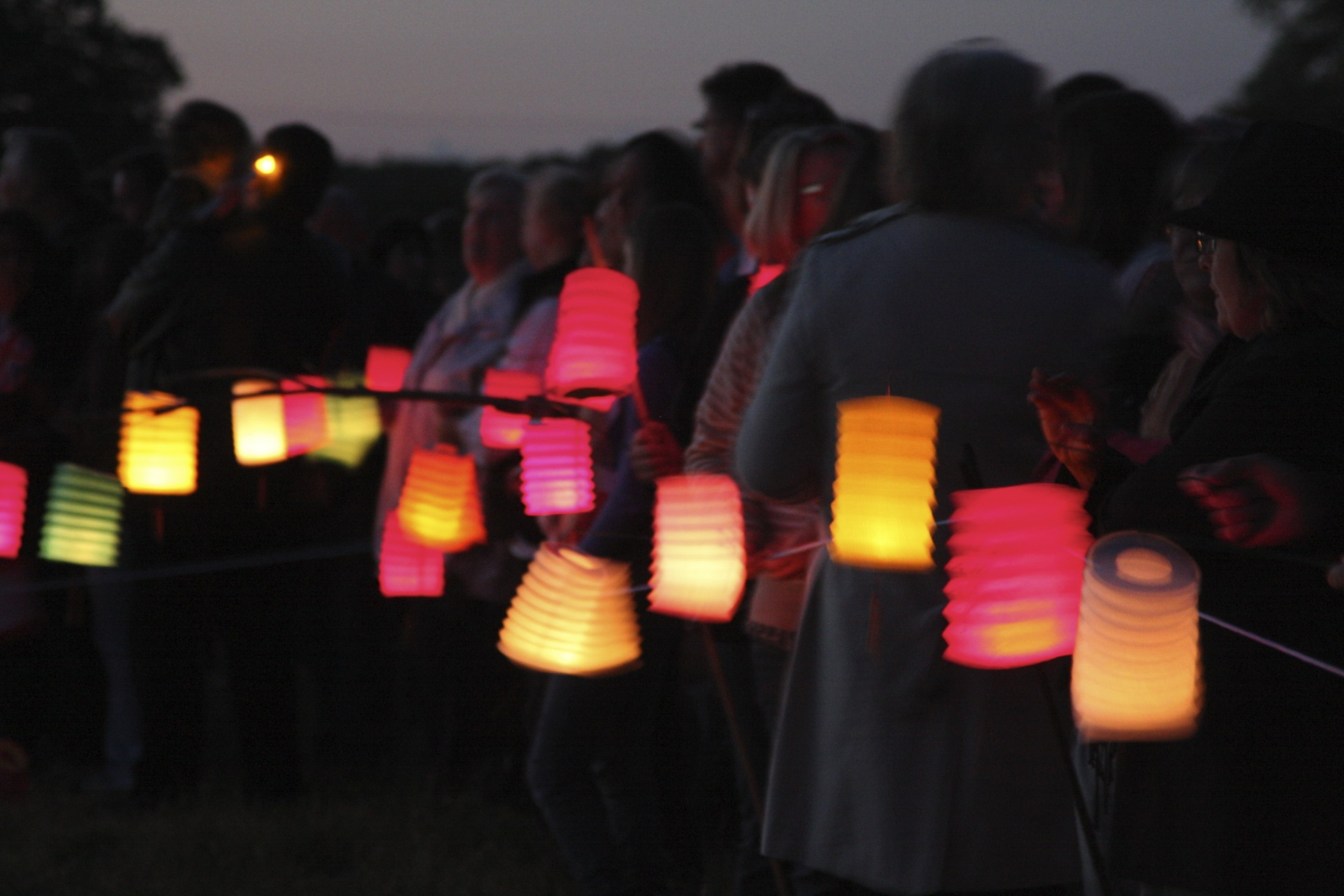
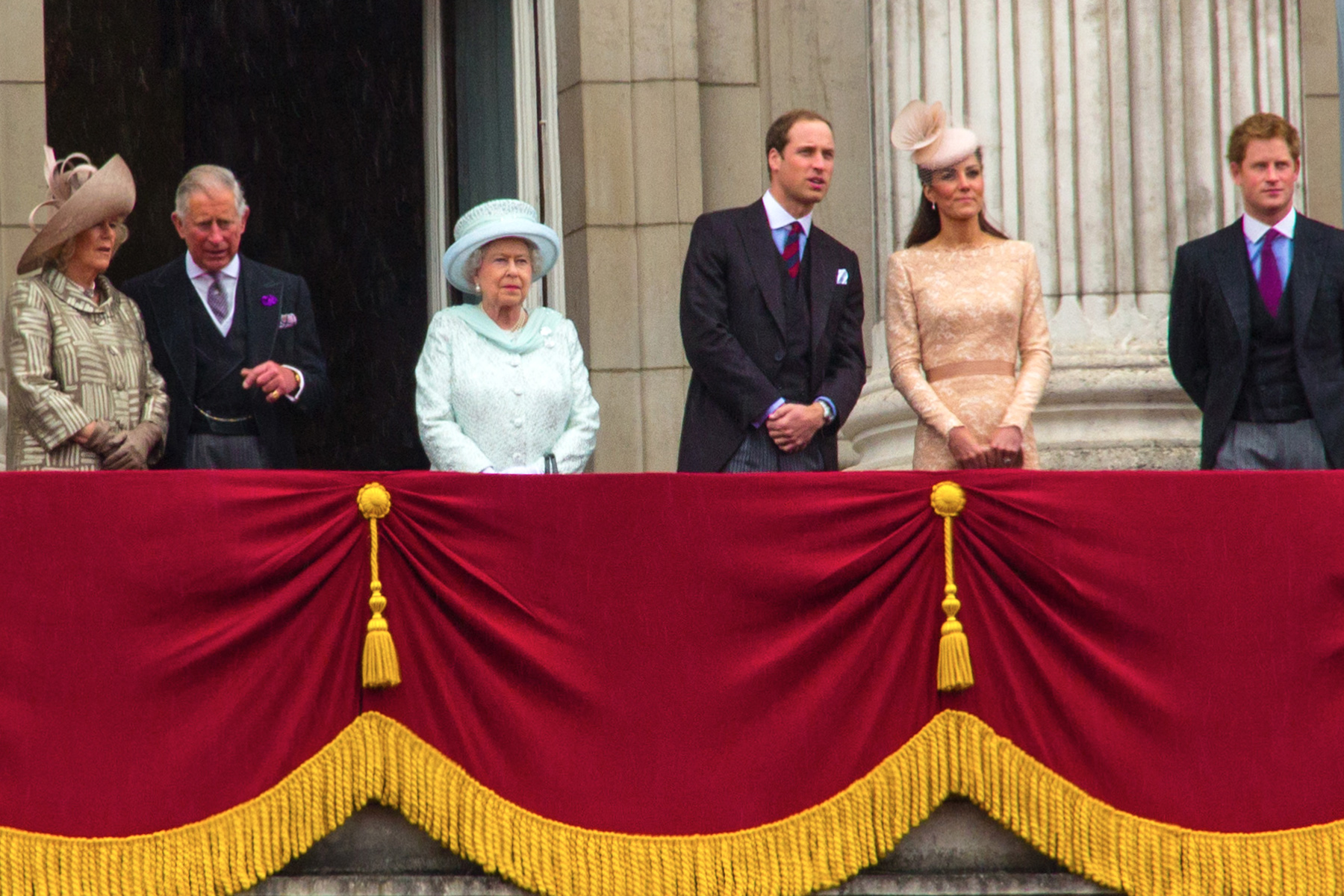
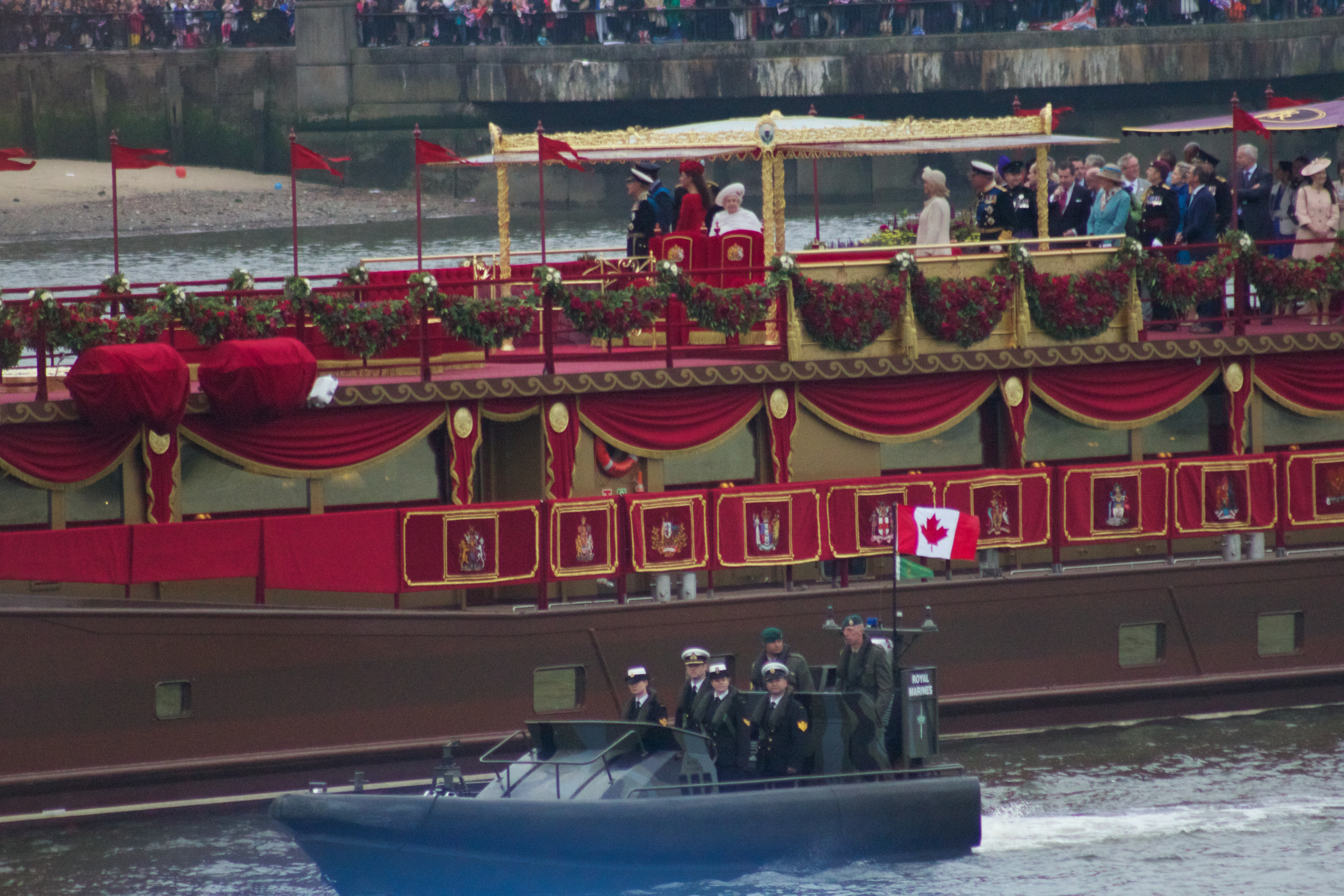
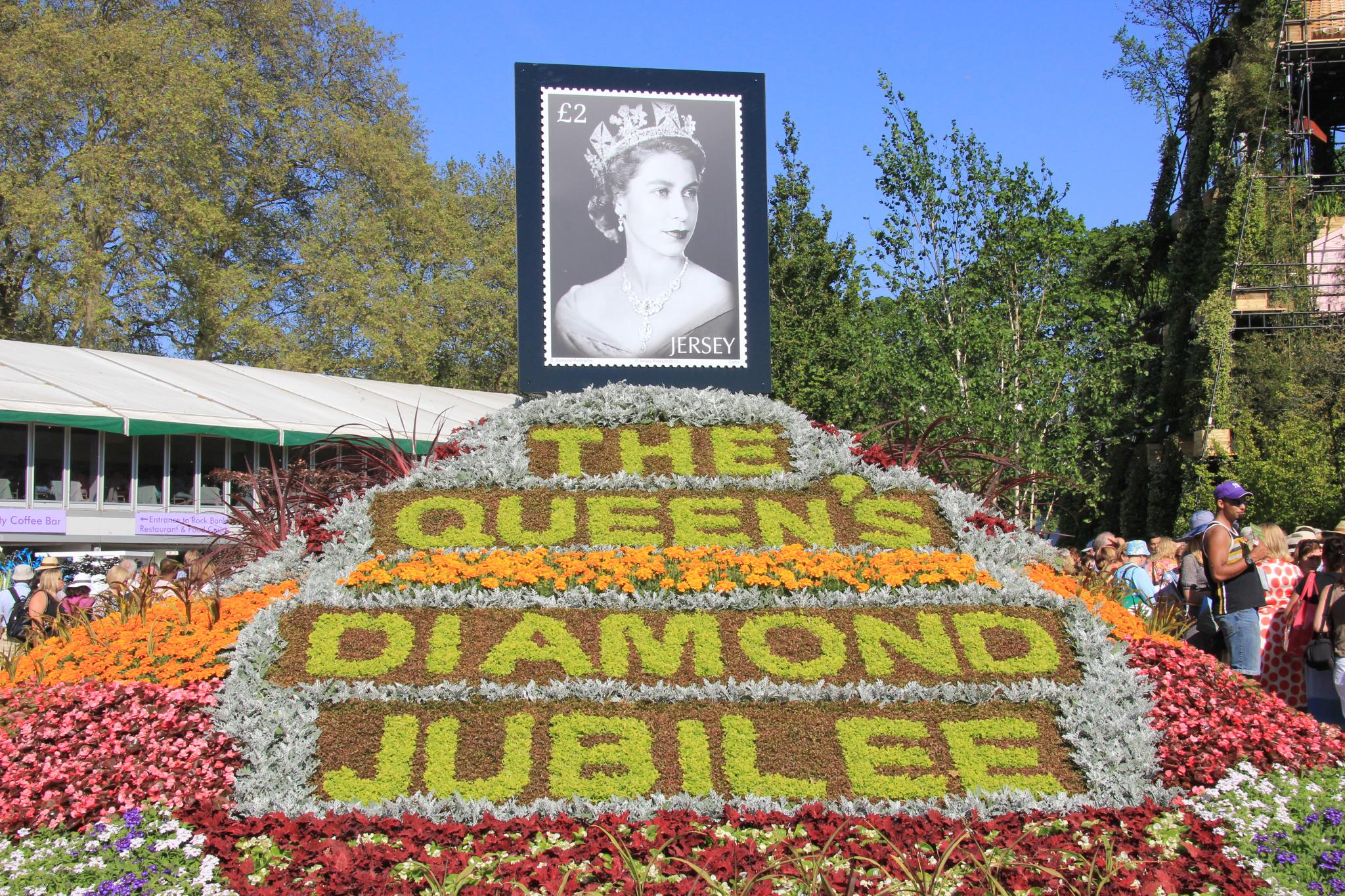
- Collage of commemorations and events of the jubilee, Clockwise: Crowds at The Mall on 2 June; Jubilee Beacon lighting in East Hoathly with Halland; The Queen and members of the royal family on the balcony of Buckingham Palace after the National Service of Thanksgiving; Diamond Jubilee Floral display at the Chelsea Flower Show 2012 in London; The Queen and members of the royal family aboard the MV Spirit of Chartwell during the Thames Diamond Jubilee Pageant; the Canadian Diamond Jubilee flag displayed on Canada House
- Genre: Jubilee of the monarch of the United Kingdom and the other Commonwealth realms
- Date: 6 February 2012; 14 years ago
- Country: United Kingdom; Canada; Australia; New Zealand; Commonwealth of Nations
- Previous event: Golden Jubilee of Elizabeth II
- Next event: Sapphire Jubilee of Elizabeth II
- Website: www.thediamondjubilee.org

The year 2012 marked the Diamond Jubilee of Elizabeth II being the 60th anniversary of the accession of Queen Elizabeth II on 6 February 1952. The only diamond jubilee celebration for any of Elizabeth's predecessors was in 1897 for Queen Victoria.

Following the tradition of the Queen's Silver and Golden Jubilees, commemorative events were held throughout the Commonwealth of Nations. In comparison to the previous Golden Jubilee, events in the United Kingdom were significantly scaled back due to the economic policies of the governing Conservative Party deeming excessive cost to the taxpayer amidst widespread austerity as inappropriate.

The Queen and the Duke of Edinburgh toured the United Kingdom and other members of the royal family toured the rest of the Commonwealth as the monarch's representatives. The Jubilee celebrations marked the beginning of the withdrawal of the Duke of Edinburgh from public life and a more prominent role for the Duke of Cambridge and Prince Harry in Commonwealth affairs.

Numerous events and tributes were held over the year and throughout the Commonwealth, culminating in a jubilee pageant held in London. The Queen Elizabeth Diamond Jubilee Trust was set up as a charitable foundation with a mission to leave a lasting legacy across the Commonwealth. Other projects included the Queen Elizabeth Diamond Jubilee Wood and the issuing of commemorative medals.

== Commonwealth-wide and beyond ==
In this special year, as I dedicate myself anew to your service, I hope we will all be reminded of the power of togetherness and the convening strength of family, friendship, and good neighbourliness, examples of which I have been fortunate to see throughout my reign and which my family and I look forward to seeing in many forms as we travel throughout the United Kingdom and the wider Commonwealth.

— Queen Elizabeth II, 2012

At the 2011 Commonwealth Heads of Government Meeting in Perth, Australia, British Prime Minister David Cameron announced the creation of the Queen Elizabeth Diamond Jubilee Trust, which was officially launched in the UK on 6 February 2012. Chaired by former British prime minister Sir John Major, the trust was intended to support charitable organisations and projects across the Commonwealth of Nations, focusing on areas such as cures for diseases and the promotion of all types of culture and education. In early 2012, Prime Minister of Australia Julia Gillard announced the Australian Crown-in-Council would make an A$5.4 million contribution to the trust and the New Zealand Crown-in-Council later made a similar $1 million donation. The Canadian government announced in April that former prime minister Jean Chrétien would be Canada's representative to the organisation.

In February 2012, a senior advisor was quoted as saying the Queen set two guidelines for the planning of her jubilee: the use of public funds should be minimised and people should not "be forced to celebrate". The first major international event of the jubilee celebrations was the Diamond Jubilee Pageant, also branded The World Comes to Windsor, a cavalcade held at Windsor Castle to celebrate the Queen's visits to and tours of over 250 countries, as well as her passion for horses. The show, which featured 550 horses and 1,100 performers from around the world, was performed in the evenings between 10 and 13 May, after the daytime events of the annual Royal Windsor Horse Show had taken place. The Queen attended the final night.

On 18 May, the Queen hosted an informal lunch at Windsor Castle for more than twenty current or former monarchs from other countries. In the evening of the same day, the Prince of Wales and the Duchess of Cornwall hosted a dinner that most of the monarchs also attended, although the Queen herself was not present. Criticism was directed at the presence of the King of Bahrain at the lunch, because of alleged repression of protests against the government of Bahrain in that country in 2011. In London, protesters against the King assembled outside Buckingham Palace during the dinner, although he did not attend that event.

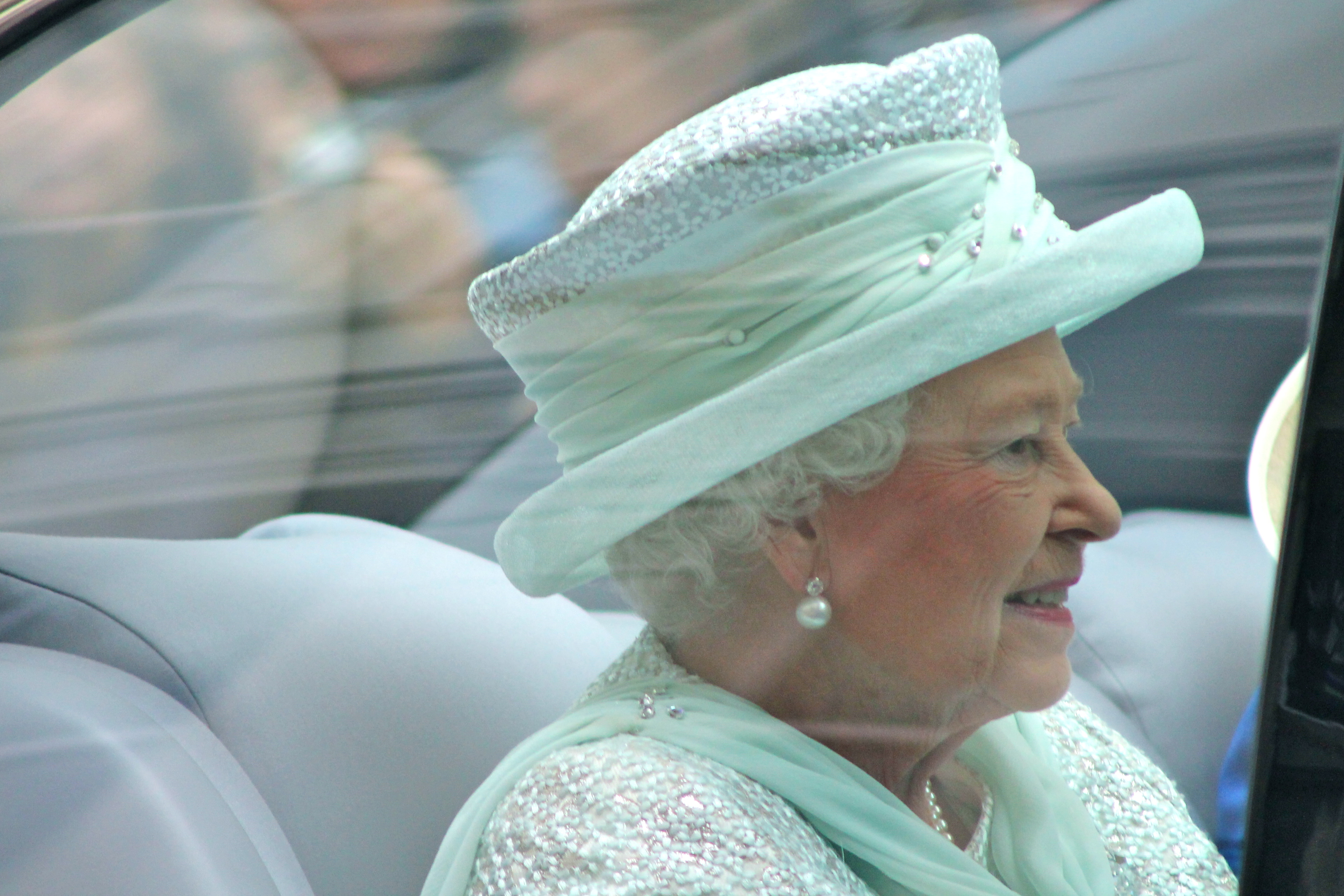
Queen Elizabeth II arriving at St Paul's Cathedral for the service of thanksgiving on 5 June 2012

The lighting of thousands of beacons across the Commonwealth took place on 4 June. The number of beacons was originally set at 2,012, to mark the year 2012. In the end, beacons of more than double that number were lit. The first beacon of the Jubilee was lit on the grounds of Apifo'ou College in Nukuʻalofa, Tonga, by Tongan girl and Boy Scouts using coconut sheath torches. Other nations, including Kenya, Australia, New Zealand, India, Seychelles, Sri Lanka, and several Caribbean states, took part in the beacon lighting. The world's most remote beacon was lit in Tristan da Cunha in the south Atlantic, using invasive, non-native plants to fuel the fire. In the United Kingdom, British servicemen and women wounded in battle and individuals representing charities carried beacons to the summits of the UK's four highest peaks. The Queen lit the beacon outside Buckingham Palace at 10:30 pm. The lighting proceeded until the final beacon was lit in Canada eight hours later.

The Queen's husband, Prince Philip, Duke of Edinburgh, was hospitalised with a bladder infection on 4 June and thus was not able to attend any of the official events. In his speech given at the conclusion of the Diamond Jubilee Concert, the Prince of Wales commented on the sadness of his father's absence and urged the crowd to cheer loud enough for the Duke to hear in hospital. Prince Edward, Earl of Wessex, stated after visiting his father that the latter was watching the celebrations on television. The Queen visited the Duke the following day.

That same evening, a pre-recorded message by the Queen was released and aired on television around the world.

== Commonwealth realms ==
=== Antigua and Barbuda ===
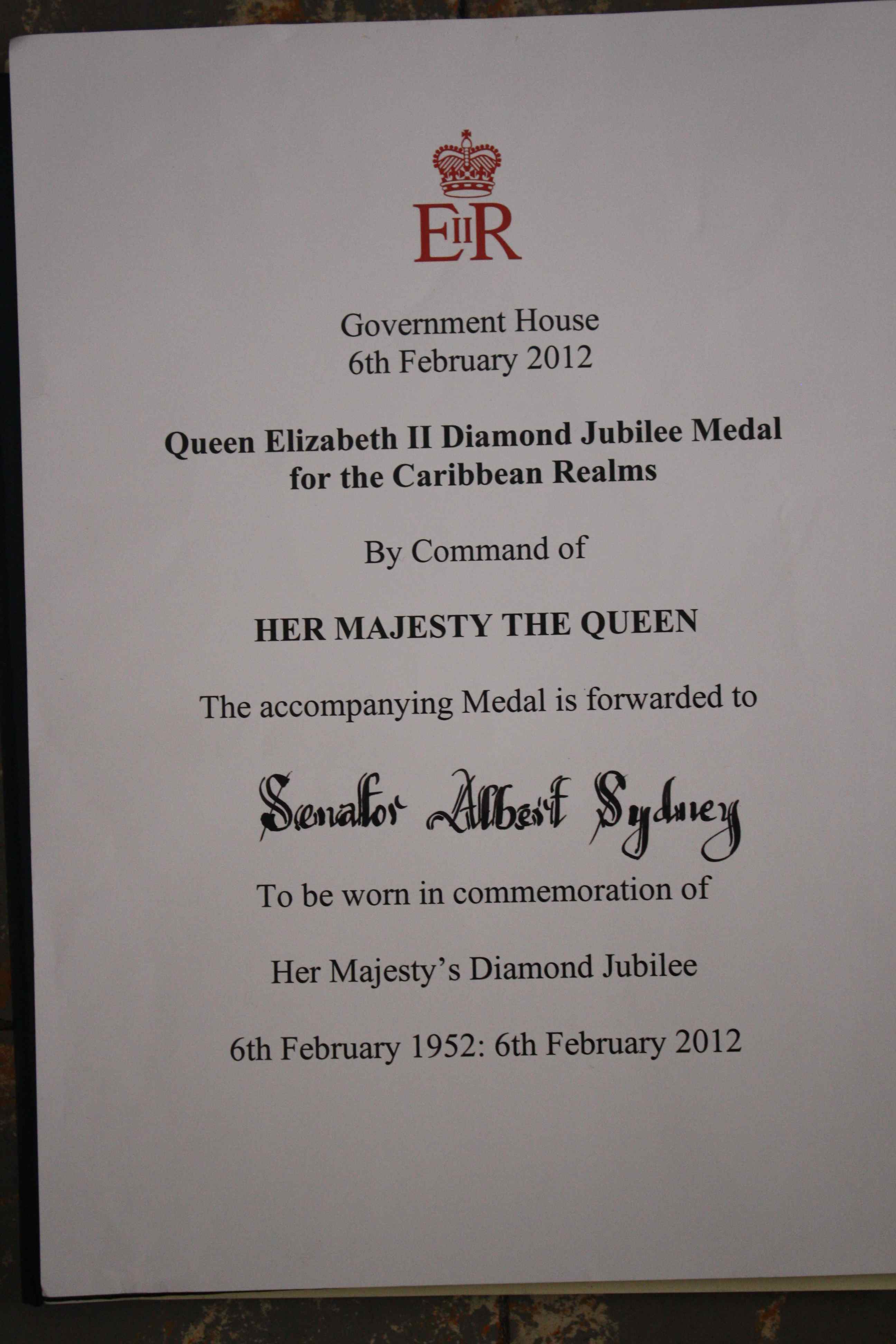
Diamond Jubilee Medal Certificate presented by Governor-General Dame Louise Lake-Tack to Senator Albert Sydney

On 6 and 7 March, the Earl and Countess of Wessex, visited Antigua and Barbuda to celebrate the Queen's Diamond Jubilee. The Earl and Countess arrived in Nelson's Dockyard on Motor Yacht Leander on the morning of 6 March. They were greeted by Governor-General Dame Louise Lake-Tack, Prime Minister Baldwin Spencer, and members of Parliament. The couple then visited the Copper and Lumber Store Hotel where they met with prominent Antiguans and Barbudans. Following that, the Earl and the Countess toured the Dockyard Museum and saw the "Royal Palm" that the Queen planted in the Dockyard in 1966.

A tree planting ceremony in Nelson's Dockyard, was followed by a tour of the Dow's Hill Interpretation Centre at Shirley Heights. The afternoon concluded with a lunch at the Admiral's Inn in Nelson's Dockyard hosted by the Prime Minister. On Tuesday evening, the Governor-General hosted an official State Dinner for the couple at the Mill Reef Club. During the second day of their visit, the Earl and the Countess visited institutions which were related to their personal charity work. The Countess visited the Children's Ward at Mount Saint John's Medical Centre, Princess Margaret School, and the Adele School for Special Children in St. John's, while the Earl visited the Duke of Edinburgh Award Programme and the Antigua Grammar School. To close their visit to Antigua and Barbuda, Prince Edward and Countess Sophie enjoyed a Diamond Jubilee Lunch at the Jumby Bay Resort on Long Island.

In June, lighting of a Jubilee Beacon and a Jubilee Service of Thanksgiving also took place in Antigua and Barbuda. 50 Antiguan and Barbudan citizens were presented with the Diamond Jubilee Medal by the Governor-General.

=== Australia ===
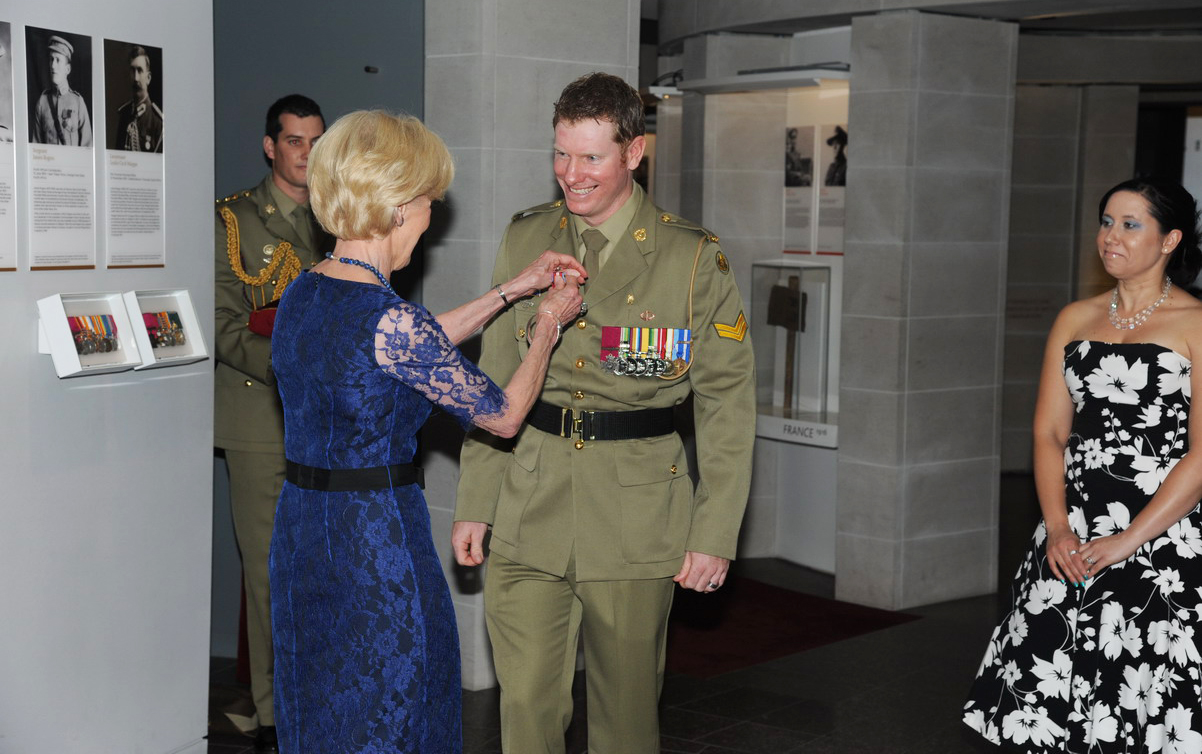
Governor-General Quentin Bryce presenting the Queen's Diamond Jubilee medal to Corporal Daniel Keighran VC, 2012

Quentin Bryce, the Governor-General of Australia, announced that the Diamond Jubilee would be celebrated "with a host of national and community events throughout the Commonwealth." In a similar vein, it was said in late 2011 that the government of Queensland was planning to declare a holiday in June 2012 to mark the jubilee.

The Royal Australian Mint announced in August 2011 that it would be releasing a silver proof 50-cent coin to celebrate the Queen's Diamond Jubilee. Australia Post issued a series of special stamps to mark the occasion.

Paying tribute to Elizabeth II as Queen of Australia in the House of Representatives on 6 February 2012, Prime Minister of Australia Julia Gillard stated the Queen was a revered figure in Australia. Gillard also announced that she would on 4 June light a beacon atop Parliament House and that a street in the parliamentary triangle in Canberra would be renamed Queen Elizabeth Terrace. Meanwhile, Premier of Western Australia Colin Barnett announced on 28 May that a new waterfront development in Perth would be named Elizabeth Quay in the Queen's honour.

A detachment of the New South Wales Mounted Police performed at the Diamond Jubilee Pageant held at Windsor Castle in May 2012. At the end of the same month, Prince Charles presented Diamond Jubilee medals to those in the Victoria Cross and George Cross Association, including three Australian Victoria Cross recipients.

A special ecumenical service was conducted in St James' Church, Sydney, at which the invited preacher was Cardinal George Pell and the Governor of New South Wales, Marie Bashir, was the guest of honour. The Anglican Church of Australia also held a service of prayer and thanksgiving to commemorate the Diamond Jubilee at St John's Cathedral in Brisbane, on 20 May 2012. The service was welcomed by Phillip Aspinall, Anglican Archbishop of Brisbane, and the Homily was given by Mark Coleridge, Catholic Archbishop of Brisbane. The guest of honour was the Governor of Queensland, Penelope Wensley, and Ian Walker represented the Cabinet of Queensland.

In Brisbane, the newly built Supreme and District Court building was named after the Queen to mark the Diamond Jubilee.

Between 5 and 10 November 2012, Charles, Prince of Wales, and Camilla, Duchess of Cornwall, toured the country, travelling to Queensland, Victoria, South Australia, New South Wales, and the Australian Capital Territory.

=== The Bahamas ===
Prince Harry toured The Bahamas. There, he attended a reception for youth leaders and met with Governor-General of the Bahamas Sir Arthur Foulkes. The Prince attended an outdoor ceremony where children's schools, clubs, and associations presented themselves and delivered a speech at Government House.

=== Barbados ===
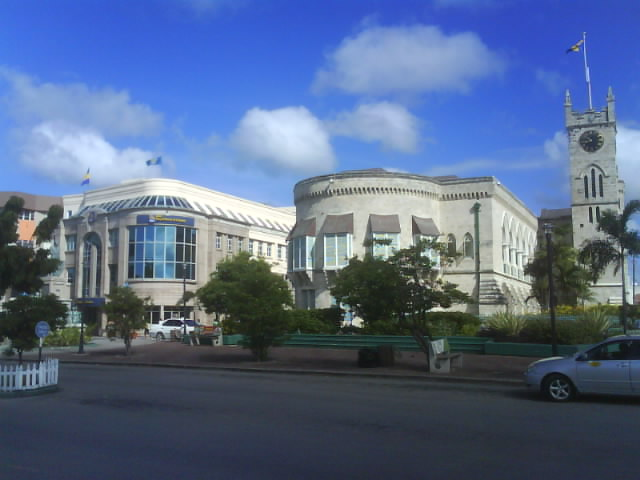
The Parliament of Barbados, where the Earl of Wessex read to a joint sitting of the legislature a message from Elizabeth II, Queen of Barbados, on 23 February 2012, to mark the Queen's diamond jubilee

To mark the Queen's Diamond Jubilee, the country hosted the Queen's youngest son and his wife, the Earl and Countess of Wessex, between 23 and 24 February 2012. The tour began with the Earl and Countess arriving, aboard RFA Fort Rosalie, at the Port of Bridgetown, where Barbadian military personnel were given inspection. To a joint sitting of the Parliament of Barbados, the Earl read a written message from the Queen, in which the monarch stated she has taken note of the level of development Barbados had achieved during its 45 years of independence and called the country a model small state for others around the world. Parliamentary officials responded with thanks to the Queen for her service to the country and Barbadians and invited her to the island to celebrate the 375th anniversary of the establishment of the Barbadian parliament in 2014. The visiting royal couple opened an exhibit at the University of the West Indies, Cave Hill Campus, and an official state dinner and reception was held at Government House in the evening.

The following day, the Countess visited the Albert C. Graham Children's Development Centre at Ladymeade Gardens, while the Earl presented eight Duke of Edinburgh's Gold Awards to Barbadian youth at a dedication ceremony. Directly following, the couple travelled together to a ceremony to commemorate the Diamond Jubilee, where a plaque was unveiled at the Kensington Oval cricket stadium. Other events included the Earl and Countess lunching with Prime Minister Freundel Stuart at his residence, Ilaro Court, and touring several areas of Bridgetown that were added to UNESCO's list of World Heritage Sites in 2011.

As in other Commonwealth realms, a set of commemorative Diamond Jubilee stamps were released by the Barbados Postal Service. An ecumenical thanksgiving service was held at the St. Mary's Anglican Church in Bridgetown on 3 June and a beacon lighting at the Garrison Savannah the following day, where an official Trooping of the Colour was performed by the Barbados Defence Force and military tattoo performed by the Royal Barbados Police Force. Members of the Barbados Boys Scout Association with high honours were chosen to aid in the actual beacon lighting.

=== Belize ===
In Belize, the Governor-General-in-Council and the Belize Tourism Board organised a tour of the country by Prince Harry, between 2 and 3 March 2012, as part of the country's celebrations of the Queen's Diamond Jubilee. Harry visited Belmopan and San Ignacio where ceremonies and events had less emphasis on state protocol. In the capital, Harry unveiled a series of commemorative stamps issued by the Belize Postal Service, attended the city's street festival, and dedicated a street as Queen Elizabeth II Boulevard, where he delivered a speech on the sovereign's behalf.

=== Canada ===
The official emblem of the Queen of Canada's Diamond Jubilee

==== Planning ====
Forethought on the anniversary began as early as April 2007, when then-Secretary of State for Canadian Heritage Jason Kenney requested the various lieutenant governors begin preparations for the jubilee. Three years later, the question of a national holiday to mark the jubilee was raised in the media and a series of official announcements were made by the Minister of Canadian Heritage.

The Secretary to the Queen, Kevin S. MacLeod, was charged by the Governor General-in-Council to head the Diamond Jubilee Committee (DJC)—a 14-member group of individuals drawn from the provincial and territorial governments, non-governmental organisations, officials from the Departments of Citizenship and Immigration, National Defence, and Canadian Heritage (DCH), and the Royal Canadian Mounted Police—that oversaw the organisation of the country's fêtes for Elizabeth II's 60 years as Queen of Canada. Similarly, Premier of Alberta Ed Stelmach in February 2011 tasked the Alberta Chief of Protocol and the Private Secretary to the Lieutenant Governor of Alberta to form and head a committee to develop plans for the province's Diamond Jubilee celebrations. As with other royal events, the DCH played a large role in organisation and planning. $7.5 million of resources, granted to the DCH in the previous budget approved by the federal parliament, was allocated for federal jubilee celebrations, education and awareness, and distribution to community groups; $2 million was for events in the Queen's honour and $3.7 million was allocated for the Diamond Jubilee medal. The total amount was reduced by Minister of Canadian Heritage James Moore from the DJC's original estimate of $8.8 million.

==== Pre-events ====
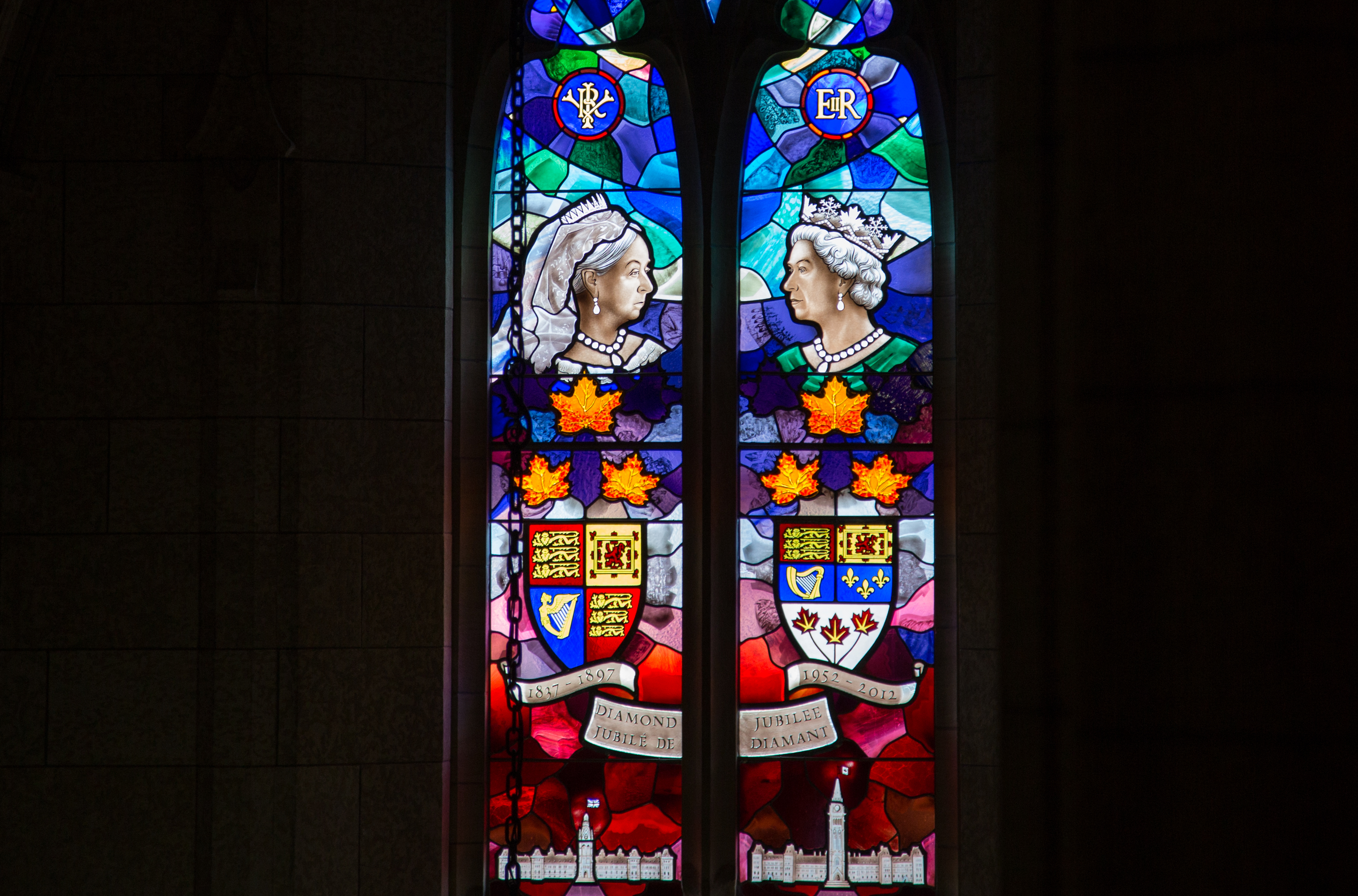
The Diamond Jubilee Window in the Senate foyer in the Centre Block of Canada's parliament. It depicts Elizabeth II along with Queen Victoria, who also celebrated a diamond jubilee.

The Queen, on 3 July 2010, dedicated the Queen Elizabeth II Gardens outside her official residence in Manitoba and there planted an Amber Jubilee Ninebark shrub, the cultivar having been created specifically for the Diamond Jubilee. At Rideau Hall in Ottawa, she also, on 30 June, unveiled a commemorative stained glass window depicting herself and Queen Victoria with their respective royal cyphers and renditions of the Centre Block of the Canadian parliament during the reign of each monarch. The window, a gift from the Canadian Senate, was installed above the Senate entrance to the Centre Block and dedicated by Governor General David Johnston on 7 February 2012.

A corbel within the Sovereigns' Arches of the Senate foyer was sculpted into a rendition of the Queen and unveiled on 9 December 2010 by the Governor General. The Royal Canadian Mint also issued an "extensive set" of coins to mark the anniversary. Further, the Royal Regiment of Canadian Artillery (RRCA) in 2011 presented the Queen, their captain-general since 1952, with a diamond and gold brooch, made by Birks & Mayors in the form of the regiment's cap badge, and announced the creation of The Captain General's Diamond Jubilee Bursary Award for educational activities of members of the RRCA and family.

==== Diamond Jubilee Week ====
The royal standard of Elizabeth II, Queen of Canada, which was flown at various locations across Canada during Diamond Jubilee Week.

Diamond Jubilee Week began on Accession Day (6 February) 2012. That day, the monarch's personal standard for Canada was unfurled at Rideau Hall and on Parliament Hill, as well as at provincial royal residences and legislatures across the country; permission was granted by the Queen to break the usual protocol of flying the banner only where the sovereign is physically present. At noon on the same day, the Peace Tower carillon played a tribute to Elizabeth II. (Note: This included the tunes O Canada, Westminster (for carillon), Jerusalem, This Canada of Ours, Andante (from Sonata for 47 Bells), and God Save the Queen.) The Prime Minister and the leader of the Liberal Party of Canada issued statements commending the Queen for her six decades of "dedicated service to our country, to the Commonwealth and to the world."

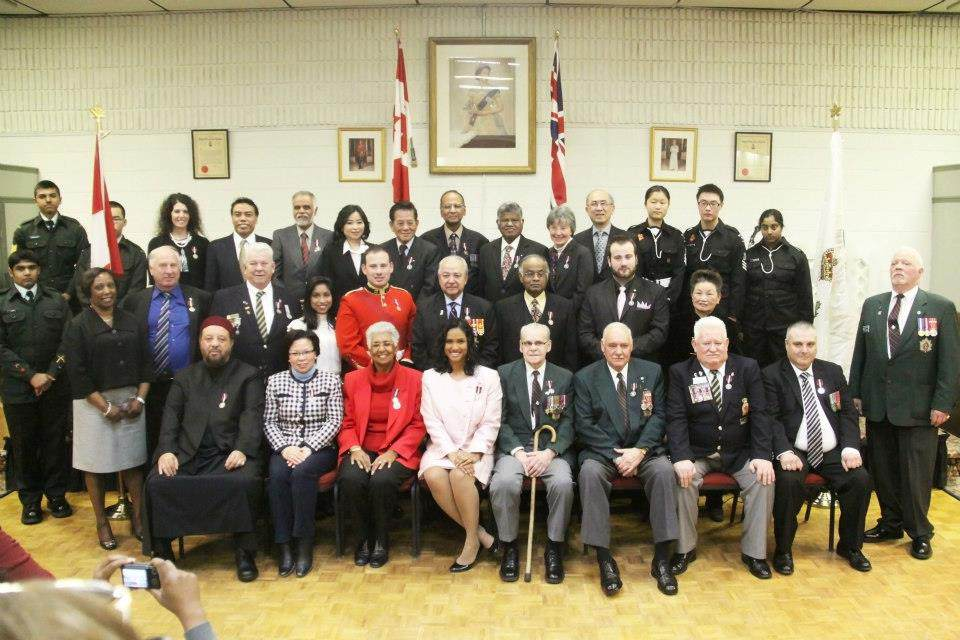
Recipients of the Queen Elizabeth II Diamond Jubilee Medal and Canadian MP Rathika Sitsabaiesan after the medal's presentation ceremony in Toronto.

Also on 6 and 7 February, the first of the 60,000 Canadian Queen Elizabeth II Diamond Jubilee Medals to be distributed to citizens and permanent residents were handed out by lieutenant governors, commissioners, and other dignitaries across the country; 60 individuals were given theirs personally by the Governor General at Rideau Hall. All federal Members of Parliament (MPs) received the award automatically and a few refused, some because they belonged to the Quebec separatist Bloc Québécois, and one because he felt the money being spent by the Crown on jubilee events and markers was a waste. Citizens for a Canadian Republic claimed that day that the government's spending of money on the Queen's jubilee was to be expected "from the personality cult dynasties of North Korea or Syria". The Saint-Jean-Baptiste Society claimed it would stage "counter-celebrations".

In Nova Scotia, the provincial government announced the establishment of educational programmes related to the Queen and her role in Canadian government and the one-time award of the $2000 Diamond Jubilee Award Scholarship to 60 Grade 12 students in the province. There and in other provinces and territories, various events were held on Accession Day, other days during Diamond Jubilee Week, and past its end. (Note: Gordie Gosse, the Speaker of the House of Assembly of Nova Scotia, held a youth event at Province House. Lieutenant Governor of British Columbia Steven Point hosted a tea and later formal reception at Government House. A public official reception was held by the territorial commissioner at the Legislative Assembly of the Northwest Territories on 7 February, at which a pictorial display with the theme of past royal tours of the territory was opened. A ceremony, attended by the Lieutenant Governor, Premier, and parliamentary officials was held in conjunction with the opening of the British Columbia legislature on 14 February. And Lieutenant Governor of Ontario David Onley mounted at the viceregal suite at the Ontario Legislative Building an exhibition entitled 60 in 60, to "show six decades of Her Majesty's devotion and service to Canada.") The Speaker of the Senate, Noël Kinsella, and Speaker of the House of Commons, Andrew Scheer, were received by the Queen at Buckingham Palace on 21 February 2012, where they presented a loyal address to the sovereign. The Canadian Postal Museum also opened on 19 March the exhibition Designed for a Queen, which displayed 645 postal portraits of the Queen from Canada, other Commonwealth of Nations countries, and British Overseas Territories.

==== Royal tour ====
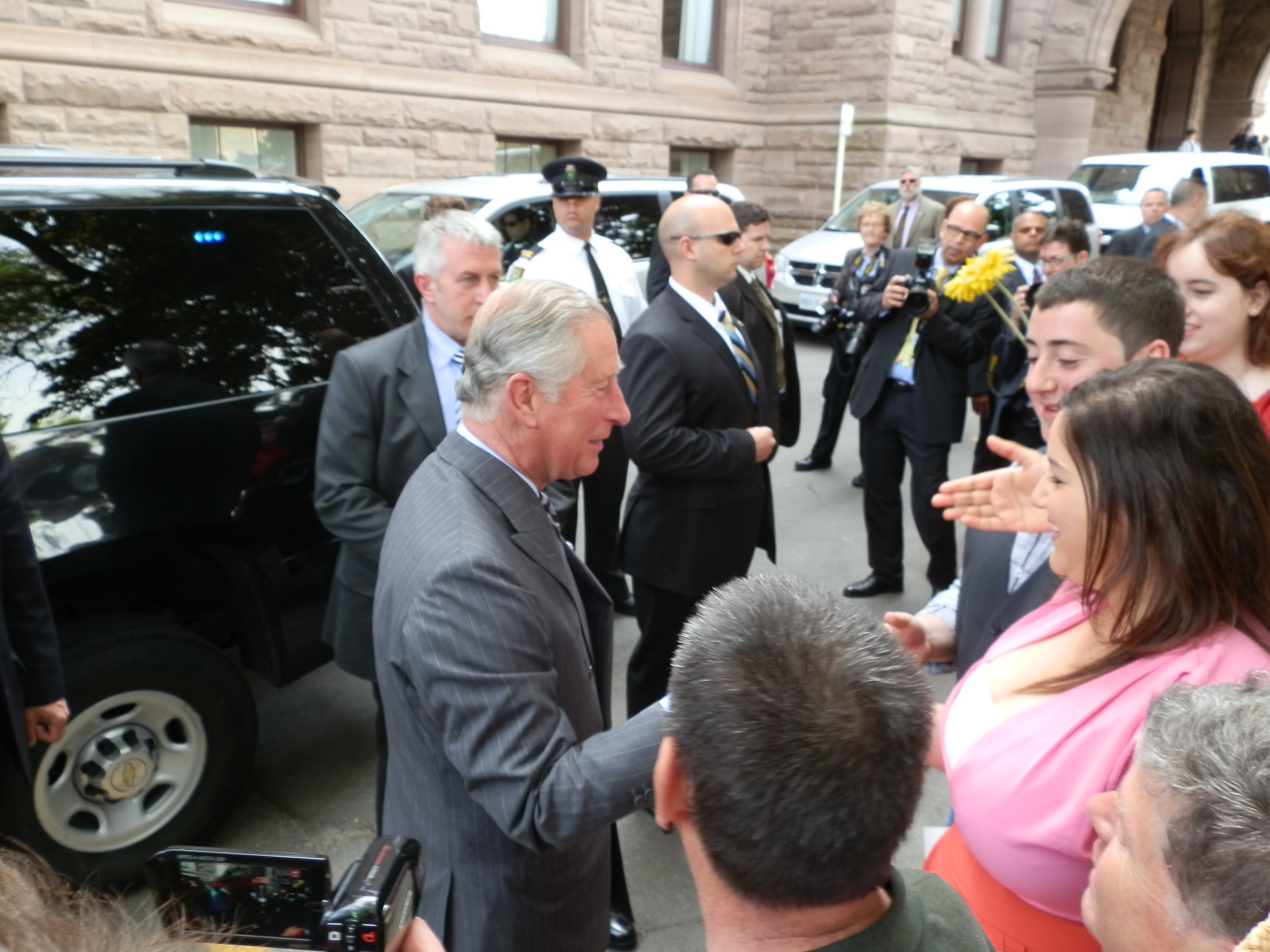
Charles, Prince of Wales, speaks to the public outside of the Ontario Legislative Building during his tour of Canada for the Diamond Jubilee

Charles, Prince of Wales, and Camilla, Duchess of Cornwall, toured parts of the country in May, making stops in New Brunswick, Ontario, and Saskatchewan. In an editorial he wrote for The Globe and Mail, Charles stated he wanted his activities during the tour to reflect the jubilee's "central theme of service to others" and expressed that he was "returning to Canada in this special Jubilee year, to renew my own pledge of service and to encourage others to consider how they might contribute their own particular talent". In that vein, he in all three provinces visited with people associated with his organisation The Prince's Charities Canada and presented Diamond Jubilee Medals to recipients.

The couple arrived at Saint John Airport on the evening of 20 May. The following day, they were formally welcomed by the Governor General and met at Canadian Forces Base Gagetown with young Canadian Forces veterans and mentors involved in the Military Entrepreneurship program before moving on to Saint John. There, they undertook a walking tour of Prince William Street to observe heritage projects and meet the 2002 Committee for the Prince of Wales Municipal Heritage Leadership Prize, participated in a citizenship ceremony, attended Victoria Day events, and opened the Diamond Jubilee IT Centre at Hazen-White-St. Francis School. They then flew on to Toronto to meet with emergency workers and their families and observe the annual fireworks show at Ashbridges Bay that marks Victoria Day and the Queen's official Canadian birthday.

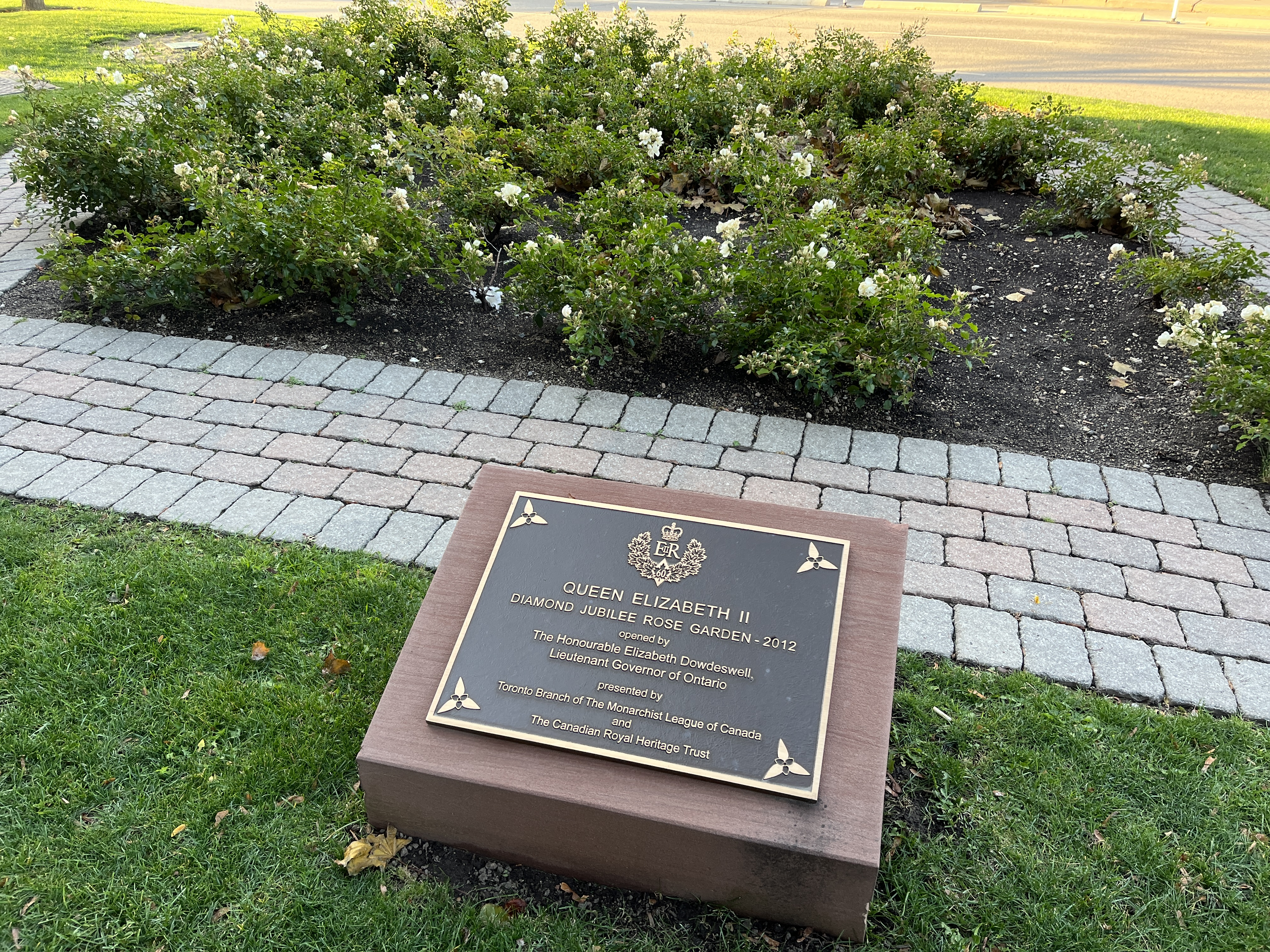
The Diamond Jubilee Rose Garden at Queen's Park. The gardens were unveiled during the jubilee year.

On 22 May, the couple attended an event hosted by the Lieutenant Governor of Ontario, David Onley, at Queen's Park. After, the Duchess visited The Queen's Own Rifles of Canada, of which she is colonel-in-chief, laying at the armoury a wreath in memory of fallen Canadian soldiers, while the Prince of Wales saw the Digital Media Zone at Ryerson University, toured the construction site of the athletes' village for the 2015 Pan American Games (where Premier of Ontario Dalton McGuinty announced a portion of Front Street running through the village would be named Diamond Jubilee Promenade), visited the Yonge Street Mission, and met with the national leadership of the Assembly of First Nations. The couple also attended a luncheon hosted by the government of Ontario and participated in a Canadian Forces event at Fort York commemorating the 200th anniversary of the War of 1812, the Prince there wearing his uniform of a lieutenant-general of the Canadian Army.

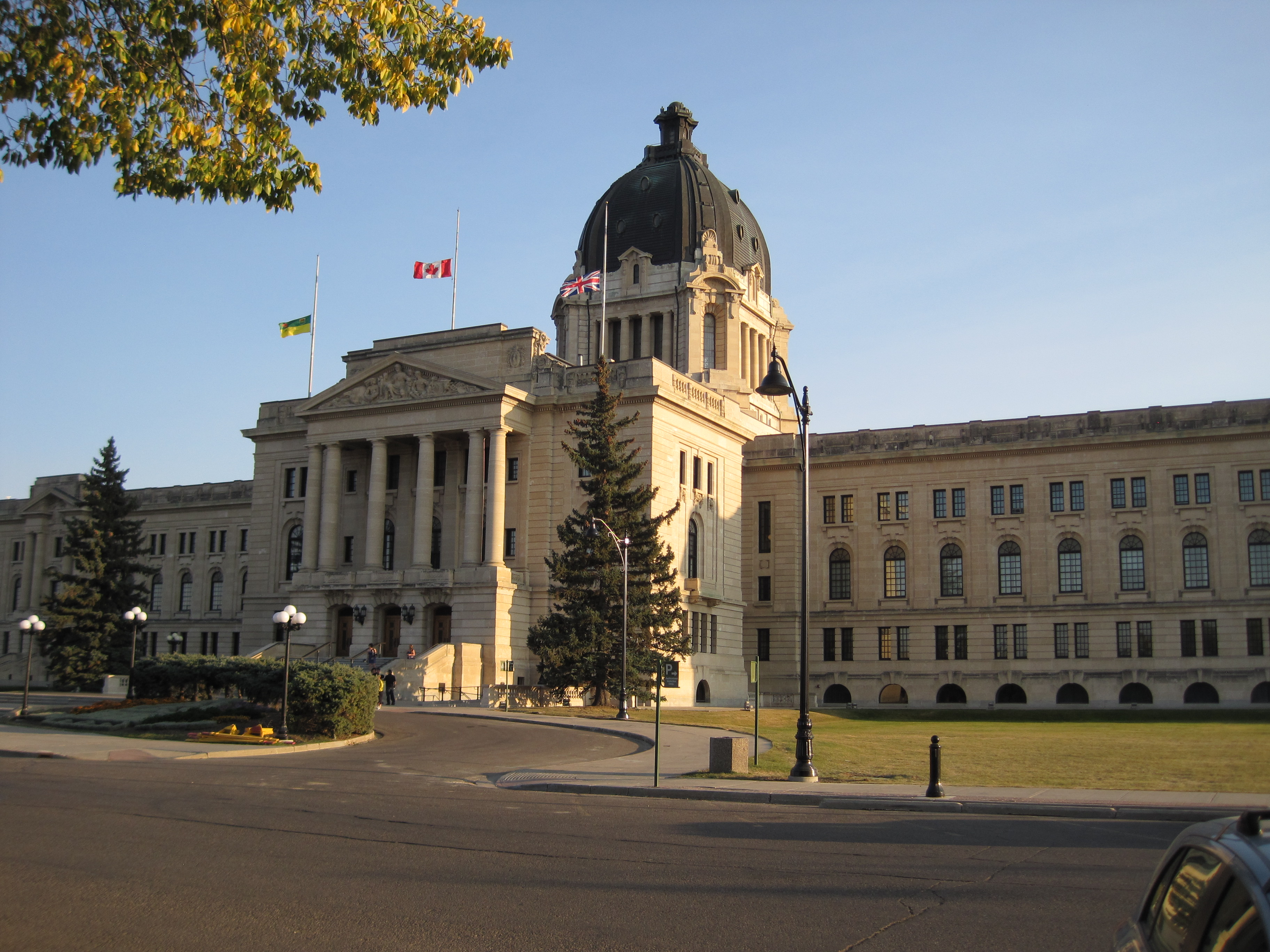
The Saskatchewan Legislative Building in 2012. The building's centenary was marked by Charles, Prince of Wales, and Camilla, Duchess of Cornwall, as part of their Canadian royal tour earlier that year.

They arrived in Regina on 23 May and marked the centenary of Saskatchewan's legislative building, participated in a reception held by the Lieutenant Governor of Saskatchewan, Vaughn Solomon Schofield, at Government House, toured the First Nations University of Canada, and visited an environmentally friendly water purification plant. In the evening, the Prince and Duchess attended at the Royal Canadian Mounted Police (RCMP) Depot Division Drill Hall a performance of the Regina Symphony Orchestra, of which Prince Charles is patron. There, the Prime Minister announced that Charles was to be appointed Honorary Commissioner of the RCMP, taking the post from his mother, the Queen, who became the RCMP's Commissioner-in-Chief.

New Democratic Party MP Pat Martin, an open anti-monarchist, stated in the House of Commons that the tour was "a bread-and-circuses routine" intended to distract from cuts to the federal civil service. The Minister of Canadian Heritage, James Moore, said the tour would be the "least expensive for taxpayers" of those that had taken place since 2009.

==== Events in June ====
At the Queen's request, members of the RCMP's Musical Ride, after performing in the Diamond Jubilee Pageant at Windsor Castle, took part in the Changing of the Guard on 23 May as they formed the Queen's Life Guard outside Buckingham Palace for 24 hours. Said by the contingent's commander to be a "way for Canada and the Mounties to salute her Majesty the Queen in her Diamond Jubilee year", it was the second time the RCMP had performed the task since doing so as a part of the Diamond Jubilee celebrations for Queen Victoria in 1897.

We, Your Majesty's loyal and dutiful subjects, the House of Commons of Canada in Parliament assembled, beg to offer our sincere congratulations on the happy completion of the sixtieth year of Your reign.

In this, the Diamond Jubilee year of your reign as Queen of Canada, we trust that Your gracious and peaceful reign may continue for many years and that Divine Providence will preserve Your Majesty in health, in happiness and in the affectionate loyalty of Your people.

— Parliament of Canada, 2012

In the federal parliament on 31 May, a loyal address to the Queen was passed. The Lieutenant Governor of Manitoba held a Diamond Jubilee garden party at the province's Government House on 26 May. The Royal British Columbia Museum on 1 June opened an exhibition of approximately 100 Cecil Beaton photographs of Elizabeth II throughout her life.

A team of Canadian and British mountaineers reached the summit of Mount Barbeau, in Canada's arctic, by 3 June and there held a tea party in celebration of the jubilee. From the summit, they sent a loyal greeting to the Queen via satellite, to which the monarch promised to reply. The next day, a group from the Royal Canadian Dragoons stationed in Afghanistan climbed with British soldiers to the peak of the 7,000 foot mountain Gharib Ghar, within the Kabul Military Training Center, "as part of the Diamond Jubilee celebrations for Queen Elizabeth II."

In the United Kingdom, Canada House held a Big Jubilee Lunch on 3 June and two beacons were lit on the building's roof the following evening, the night of the Diamond Jubilee Concert. David Johnston attended both events and Stephen Harper was at the latter. Another reception was held at Canada House on the evening of 6 June, at which the Governor General and Prince Andrew, Duke of York, were present. Harper was granted an audience with the Queen at Buckingham Palace on 5 June. Also at the palace, the Governor General, the Prime Minister, and the Queen unveiled a new portrait of the sovereign commissioned by the federal Crown-in-Council and painted by Canadian painter Phil Richards. The creation of the portrait became the subject of a National Film Board of Canada (NFB) documentary directed by Hubert Davis and released in the fall of 2012 as part of the NFB's Queen's Diamond Jubilee Collector's Edition. The painting was on 25 June installed in the ballroom at Rideau Hall. Dedicated at the same time by the Governor General were new bronze and glass handrails, with detailing evoking the Diamond Jubilee, flanking the ceremonial staircase in Rideau Hall's main entrance foyer.

On 12 June 2012, the government of the Northwest Territories (NWT) and the City of Yellowknife held at the Northern Arts and Cultural Centre a garden party with a barbecue, concert, and other activities. On 14 June, Amber Jubilee Ninebark shrubs were planted on the grounds of the NWT legislative assembly. Four days later, a gala concert was held at Roy Thomson Hall in Toronto, at which 600 diamond jubilee medals were awarded to members of the Order of Canada and Order of Ontario. The event, hosted by the Lieutenant Governor of Ontario, was attended by the Governor General and his wife and performers included the Famous People Players, Susan Aglukark, Molly Johnson, Ben Heppner, and Gordon Lightfoot, who conceived the idea of the event.

==== Further events ====
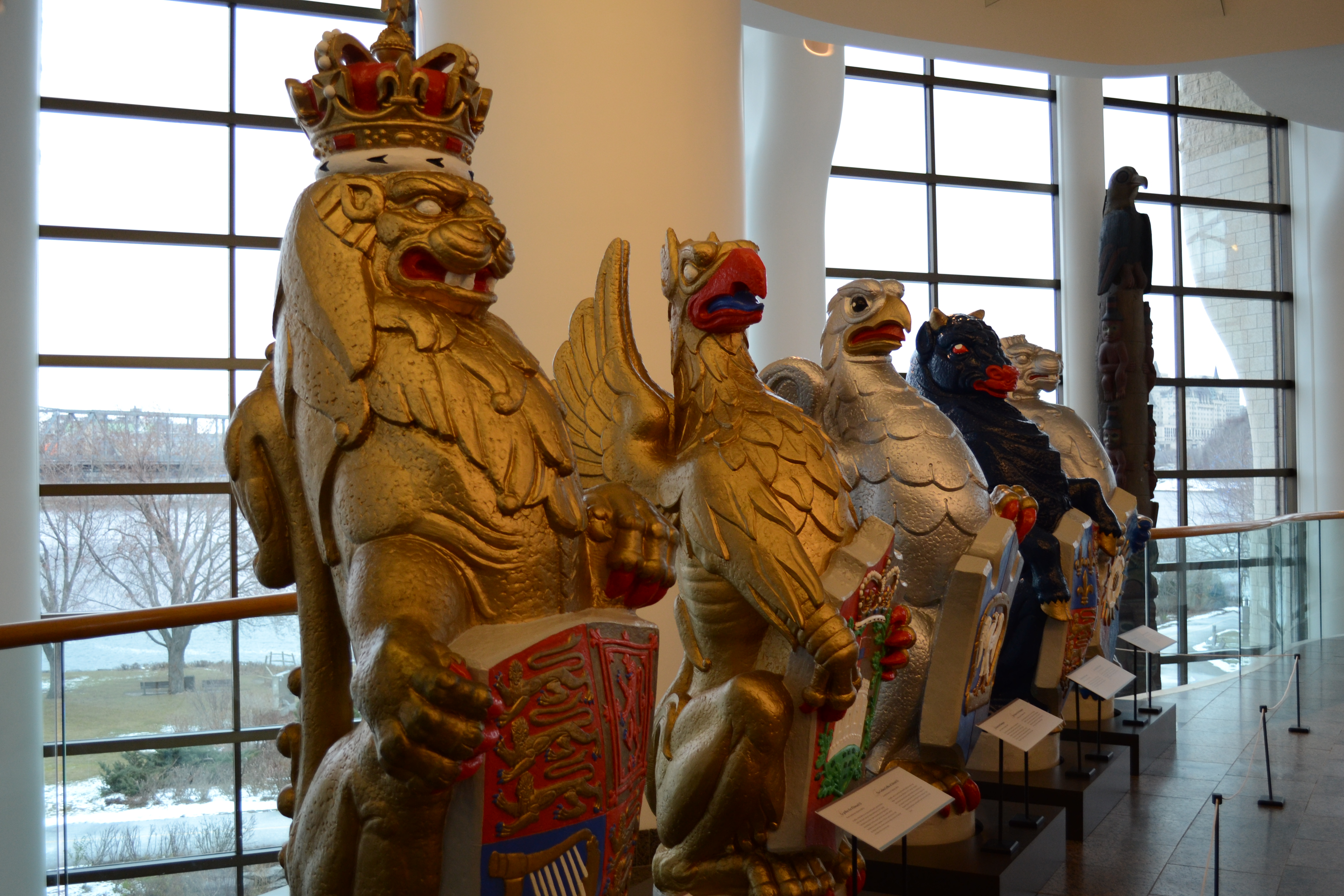
The Queen's Beasts on display at the Canadian Museum of Civilization during Elizabeth II's Diamond Jubilee

The Lieutenant Governor of Saskatchewan held a garden party at Government House on Canada Day and, in the Northwest Territories, the Canada Day parade was themed to celebrate the jubilee and numerous jubilee medal presentation ceremonies took place. Also on 1 July, the Canadian Museum of Civilization opened the exhibit A Queen and Her Country, showing artefacts from the Crown Collection relating to Queen Elizabeth II and her role as Queen of Canada, including the Queen's Beasts from her coronation. At Rideau Hall on 11 September, a reception, attended by the Governor General; his wife; Prince Edward, Earl of Wessex; Sophie, Countess of Wessex; and others, was held for the Royal Victorian Order Association of Canada and to "honour of the 60th anniversary of Her Majesty Queen Elizabeth II's accession to the Throne." The Earl also distributed Diamond Jubilee Medals to recipients in Toronto and to members of the RCMP in Iqaluit, Nunavut. The government of the Northwest Territories held through September an essay contest for youth to explain "how the Queen is important to First Nations and Métis people."

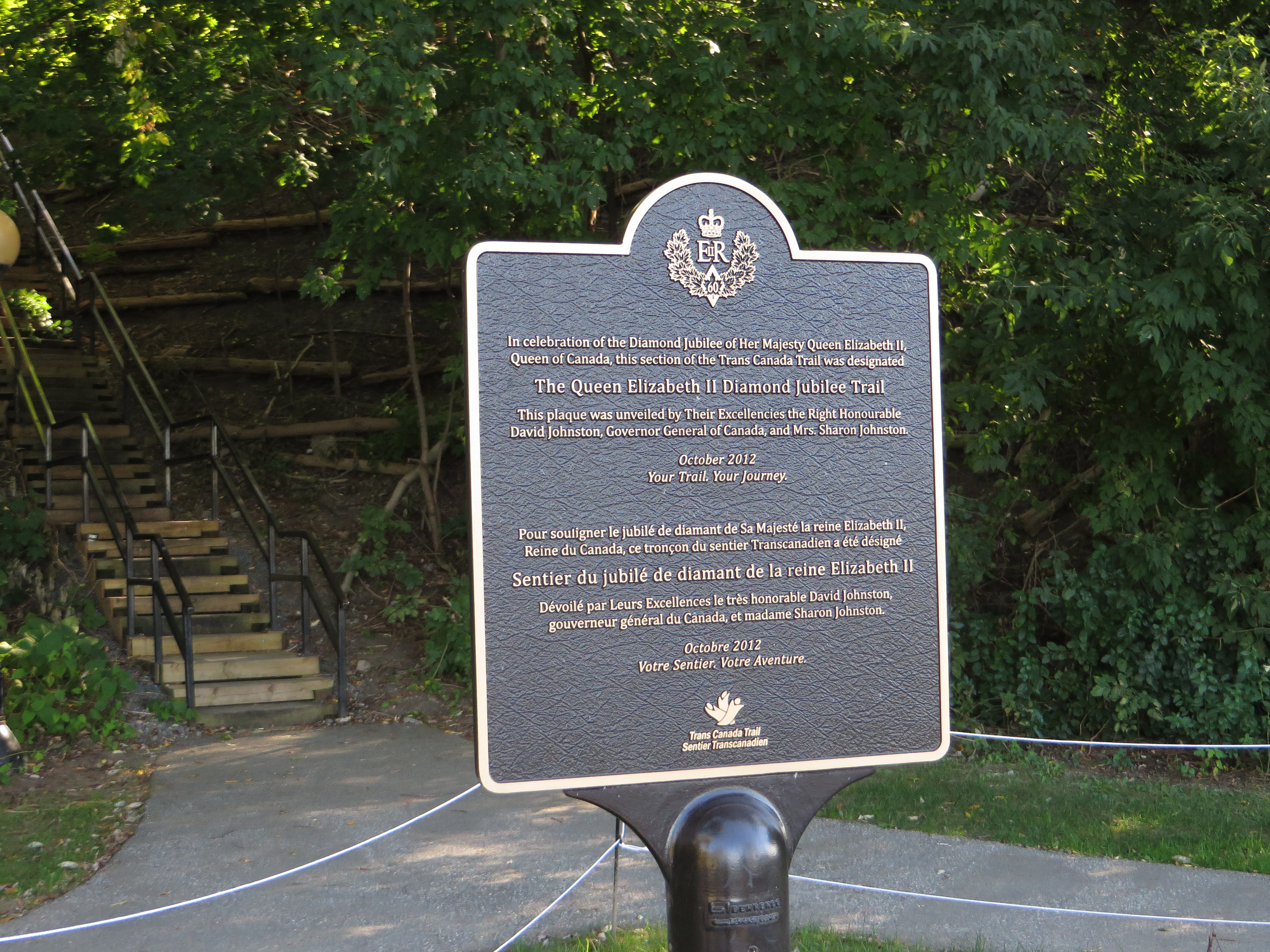
The plaque denoting the Queen Elizabeth II Diamond Jubilee Trail along the Ottawa River, beneath Parliament Hill, in Ottawa

A conference on the Canadian Crown was conducted in Saskatchewan on 25 October. The Governor General the following day unveiled a plaque identifying the Queen Elizabeth II Diamond Jubilee Trail, a part of the Trans Canada Trail between the West Block on Parliament Hill and the Supreme Court of Canada. In Nova Scotia, highway 106 was renamed as Jubilee Highway. Communities across Canada also held events to mark the jubilee, as did the federal government until the jubilee celebration ended on Accession Day 2013.

The Diamond Jubilee Calendar for the Senate was unveiled on 29 May 2013.

=== Jamaica ===
On Accession Day, Governor-General Sir Patrick Allen sent a congratulatory message to the Queen in which he said that the Queen's reign was marked by "wisdom, dedication and integrity". Allen said that the Queen had an "extraordinary knowledge and interest in Commonwealth and Caribbean Affairs", which he greatly admires.

On 3 June, a boat parade and yacht race at the north side of the Kingston Harbour was held to celebrate the Queen's Diamond Jubilee. The event was organised by the Royal Jamaica Yacht Club to coincide with the Thames Diamond Jubilee Pageant in London.

On 4 June, communities across Western Jamaica celebrated the Queen's Diamond Jubilee, at the Montego Bay Civic Centre, in Sam Sharpe Square, St. James. Tributes included popular and gospel songs, and performances by schoolchildren. The Custos of St. James, Ewen Corrodus, described the occasion as fitting for "an icon who has been a part of Jamaica's life for 60 years". A Jubilee beacon was also lit by Corrodus. The mayor of Montego Bay, Councillor Glendon Harris, congratulated the Queen on her Diamond Jubilee said that the Jubilee should be used for forgiveness and reconciliation between individuals and communities, and called for continued growth for Jamaica.

On 4 June, four beacons were lit at central points across Jamaica, in celebration of the Queen's Diamond Jubilee. The beacons were lit at St. William Grant Park in Kingston; Montego Bay Civic Centre, St. James; Seville Heritage Park, St. Ann; and at the Port Antonio town centre in Portland. At the beacon lighting in Kingston, Prime Minister Portia Simpson-Miller paid tribute to the Queen and said that during the times when the Queen graced the Jamaican shores, the people of Jamaica found in her a truly "royal personality" filled with warmth and good wishes for the people of Jamaica. The beacons were designed by the Jamaica Defence Force and built by students from the Caribbean Maritime Institute (CMI). All beacons were lit simultaneously at 10:00 p.m. at each location, and remained lit for 24 hours.

On 10 June, a church service was held at the St. Andrew Parish Church. A Diamond Jubilee Prayer, which was written at the Queen's direction, was used at the church service in Jamaica.

An exhibition was held in June, which showcased the Queen's visits to Jamaica, the recipients of awards presented by the Queen, and other things.

Commemorative Diamond Jubilee Medals were awarded by Governor-General Allen to members of the armed forces, emergency services and prison service personnel of Jamaica.

Jamaicans from all ages were invited to attend all the Diamond Jubilee events in Jamaica.

The Governor-General and his wife travelled to London to participate in various events there in June, including a reception held by the High Commissioner of Jamaica to the UK. Jamaica's Diamond Jubilee celebrations proceeded despite Portia Simpson-Miller's ongoing work to have the country become a republic.

==== Royal visit ====
Prince Harry toured Jamaica between 5 and 8 March 2012, participating in various events marking his grandmother's Diamond Jubilee. During the tour, the Prince partook in military exercises with the Jamaica Defence Force, visited Bustamante Hospital for Children and, in Trelawny Parish, visited Water Square, Falmouth Pier, and the William Knibb Baptist Church, where he paid respect at the William Knibb memorial. The Prince attended an event for the charity Rise Life, ran with Usain Bolt at the latter's training ground at the University of the West Indies, Mona. There, he was also named an Honorary Fellow of the university. A Jamaica Night reception was held at the Royal Caribbean Hotel in Montego Bay and Governor-General of Jamaica Sir Patrick Allen hosted a dinner at King's House as a combined celebration of the Diamond Jubilee and Jamaica's 50th anniversary of independence. The Prime Minister, Portia Simpson Miller, stated the tour was intended to "highlight the country's tourism developments on the North Coast and the important work being done in the area of youth and children."

=== New Zealand ===
Sir Jerry Mateparae, the Governor-General of New Zealand, unveiled New Zealand's Diamond Jubilee emblem on 27 November 2011, and announced at that time that a full programme would be forthcoming.

==== Emblem ====
The official emblem of the Queen of New Zealand's Diamond Jubilee

The diamond shape of the emblem is an allusion to the Queen's Diamond Jubilee, and the colour alludes to New Zealand's highly prized pounamu. The emblem features the Queen's royal cypher, and koru (which often features in Māori art) is used in the form of those on the chain of the New Zealand Order of Merit. The chain links represents the role of the Sovereign as a part of the New Zealand constitution and the historic links between the Crown and Māori.

The gold in the emblem represents value and achievement, whereas the manuka flowers relate to the Badge of the Queen's Service Order (QSO) which is based on stylised representation of this flower. Manuka and manuka honey are well known for their health enhancing properties.

==== Commemoration ====
New Zealand Post and the Reserve Bank of New Zealand issued a silver proof dollar coin to celebrate the jubilee in February 2012, and in the same month the Ministry for Culture and Heritage added Crown-related entries to Te Ara: The Encyclopedia of New Zealand and an essay on the jubilee to NZ.History.net.nz. The New Zealand post also issued sets of Diamond Jubilee stamps showing images of Queen Elizabeth II and Prince Philip throughout her reign.

Prime Minister John Key moved a motion in the House of Representatives congratulating the Queen on her Diamond Jubilee on 7 February. The Governor-General-in-Council also launched, two days later, via the Ministry of Health, the Queen Elizabeth II Diamond Jubilee Research Grant, "seeking to purchase research projects that transfer knowledge from initiatives with proven effectiveness, into practice in the health sector".

The New Zealand Army Band took part in the Diamond Jubilee Pageant held at Windsor Castle and also took part in the changing of guard ceremony at Buckingham Palace. In New Zealand, New Zealand Herald opinion columnist Jim Hopkins was critical of the jubilee celebrations held over the Queen's Birthday weekend, calling it a "missed opportunity". He was also critical of TVNZ's lack of jubilee related content in its daily news broadcast.

A royal tour was undertaken by Charles, Prince of Wales, and Camilla, Duchess of Cornwall, between 10 and 16 November 2012. travelling to Auckland, Wellington, Christchurch, and Manawatu. Their programme is to focus on excellence and innovation in business, agriculture, community service, and sports, as well as children's literacy and animal health.

=== Papua New Guinea ===
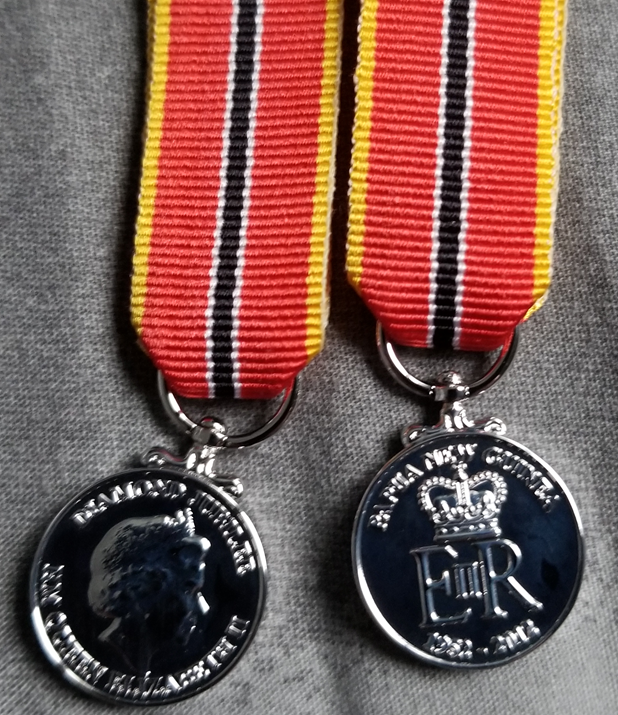
Papua New Guinean version of the Queen's Diamond Jubilee Medal, 2012

Charles, Prince of Wales, and Camilla, Duchess of Cornwall, toured Papua New Guinea between 3 and 5 November.

The Prince of Wales spoke to crowds in Port Moresby in the pidgin language of Tok Pisin, referring to himself as 'namawan pikinini bilong misis kwinn' (the number one child of The Queen). He delivered greetings from the Queen in Tok Pisin: "Mi bringim bikpela tok hamamas bilong mejesti kwin Papua Niugini na olgeta haus lain bilong mi lon dispela taim bilong Diamon Jubili misis kwin. Mi tokpisin olrite?" (I bring you greetings from Her Majesty the Queen of Papua New Guinea and from all my family members during this celebration of the Diamond Jubilee of the Queen. Was my Pisin correct?).

During their time in the country, the Prince and the Duchess met church, charity, and community volunteers, cultural groups, and members of the Papua New Guinea Defence Force in and near Port Moresby.

=== Saint Kitts and Nevis ===
Historical re-enactments were put on in Saint Kitts and Nevis for the Earl and Countess of Wessex, who arrived on 3 March 2012. There, the couple met with Governor-General Sir Cuthbert Sebastian, Prime Minister Denzil Douglas, and other dignitaries, watched cultural shows (including the performance of a calypso song about the Queen), and the Earl unveiled a plaque commemorating the Diamond Jubilee and officially designated the Basseterre Valley Park as the Royal Basseterre Valley Park. They also visited Brimstone Hill Fortress National Park and the children's ward of the JNF Hospital and the Children's Home before attending a state dinner and fireworks display at Port Zante.

=== Saint Lucia ===
The Earl and Countess of Wessex arrived in Saint Lucia on 21 February 2012.

Governor-General Dame Pearlette Louisy hosted a Charity Banquet and Ball at Government House on 9 June to celebrate the Queen's Diamond Jubilee. The event included a gourmet charity dinner, followed by dancing to the accompaniment of a full orchestra by the Royal Saint Lucia Police Band. The event was held under the theme "A Diamond Moment In Time?". The proceeds of the event went towards several charities supported by Government House.

=== Saint Vincent and the Grenadines ===
In Saint Vincent and the Grenadines, a Diamond Jubilee Celebrations Committee was established to oversee events staged to mark, between February and June 2012, the Diamond Jubilee of Queen Elizabeth II. The committee head, former Minister of Culture Rene Baptiste, stated the aim was to "showcase what we have to offer, as well as our loyalty to the Parliament..." The Earl and Countess of Wessex, aboard RFA Fort Rosalie, arrived for their tour of country on 25 February and visited the restored Saint Vincent and the Grenadines Botanic Gardens and planted a Pink Poui tree, attended an official lunch at Government House, and planted Royal Palms on the Grenadines.

Trade unionist Noel Jackson said he heard displeasure expressed by Vincentians towards the royal tour and that "a lot of people were cursing." Senator Julian Francis, the General Secretary of the governing Unity Labour Party, stated the public reaction to the presence of the royal couple "confirmed to me that we could not have won the 2009 referendum on a republic. The outpouring of the people in St. Vincent to come and greet Prince Edward yesterday confirmed to me that people, in the majority in St. Vincent, still want the monarchy... It was like a carnival in town yesterday."

A Diamond Jubilee Lecture was delivered in March, a flower show and tea party was held at Government House on 4 and 5 May, a stamp exhibition was mounted at the National Trust headquarters and an exhibition of photographs of the Queen in Saint Vincent and the Grenadines was displayed at the National Public Library. A Queen's Birthday parade took place, as did a Diamond Jubilee Beacon Event on 4 June, part of the wider plan to light such beacons at the same time across the Commonwealth.

=== United Kingdom ===
The United Kingdom's Diamond Jubilee logo

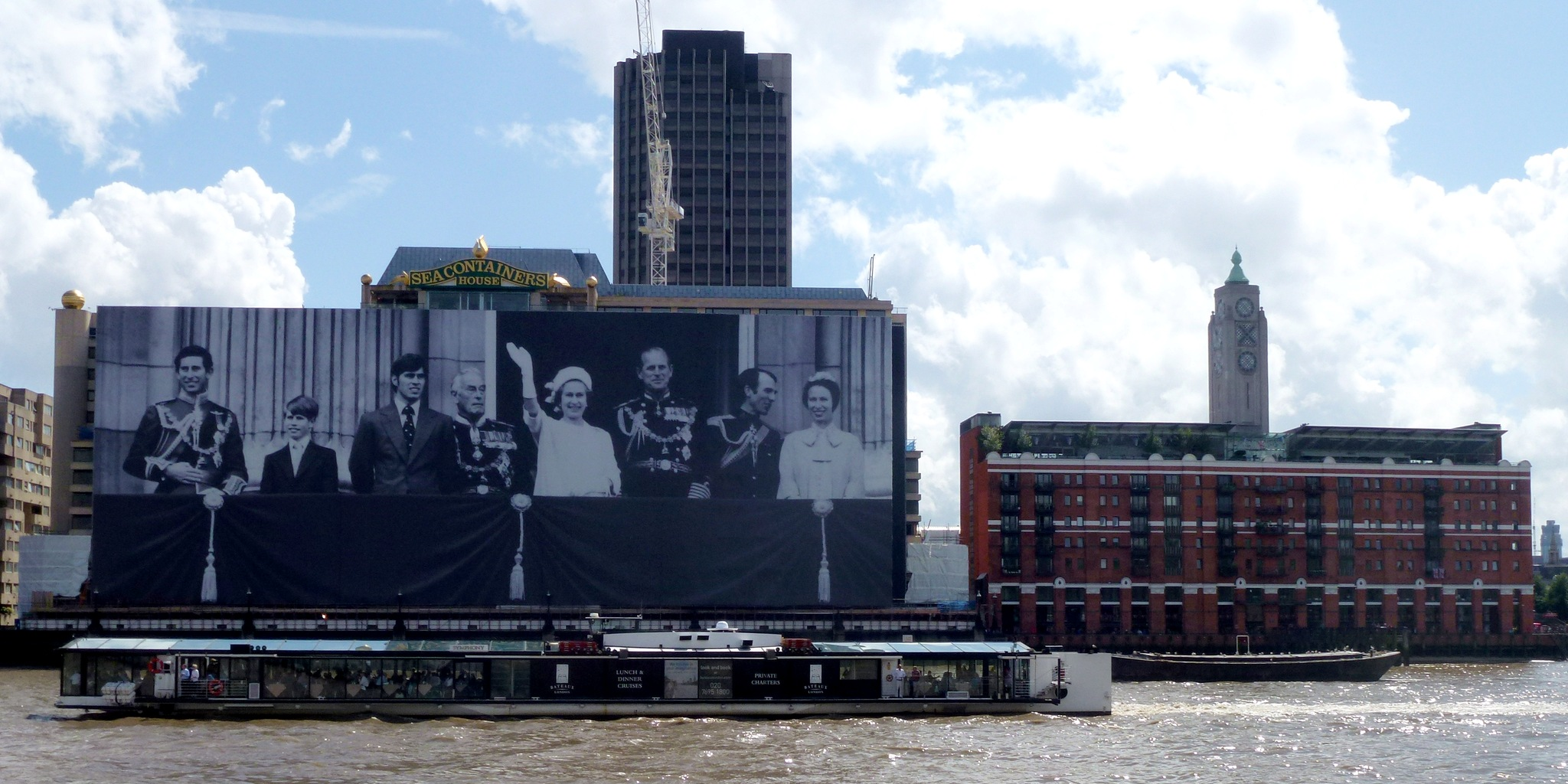
Sea Containers House decorated with a large photograph of her Silver Jubilee

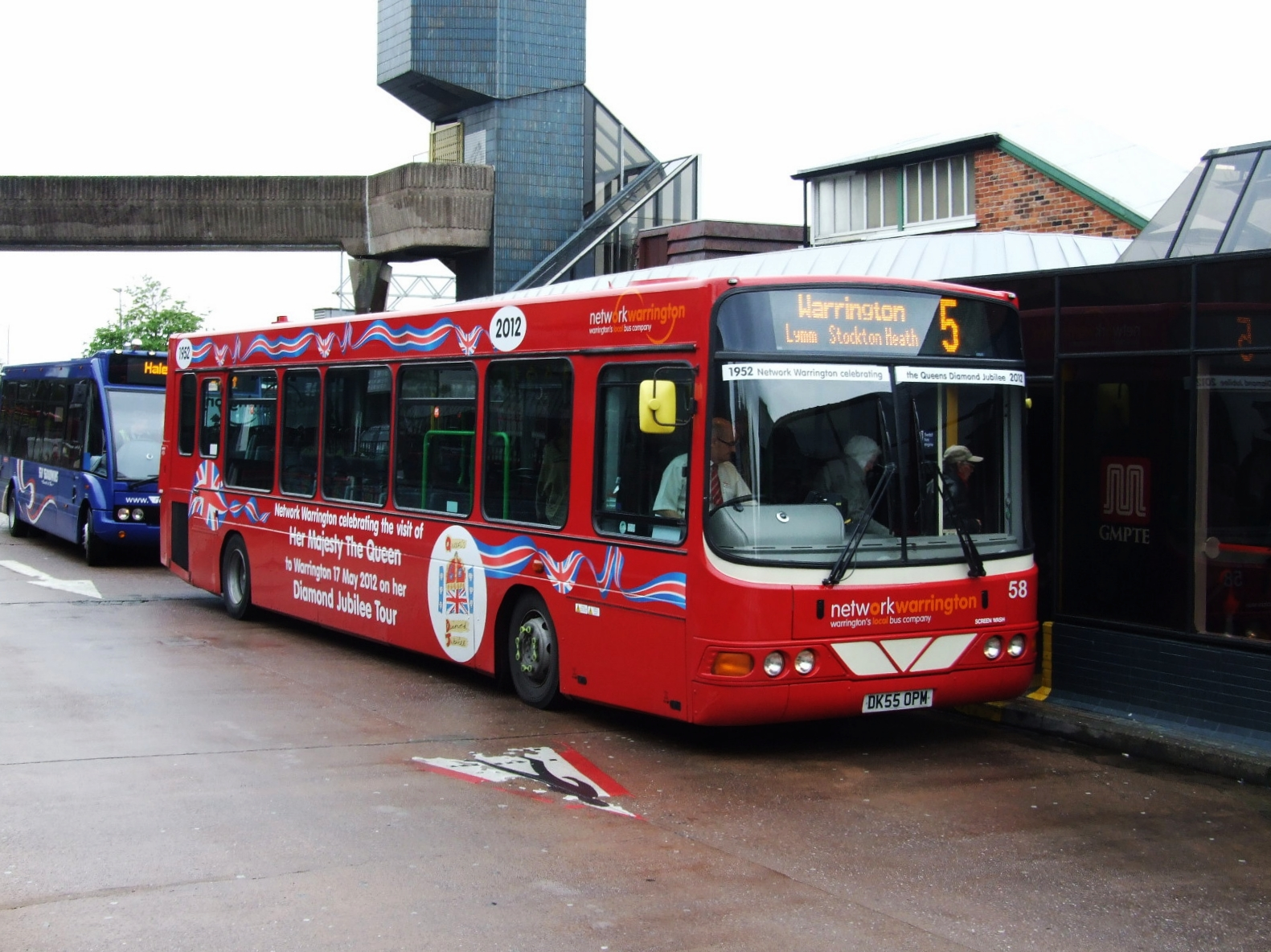
One of Warrington's Own Buses adorned in special diamond jubilee livery to mark the Queen's Diamond Jubilee

==== Planning ====
As with the Golden Jubilee in 2002, the Department for Culture, Media and Sport was responsible for coordinating the Cabinet-led aspects of the celebrations. Events were planned so as to keep the use of tax money to a minimum; most funds used to fund celebrations were drawn from private donors and sponsors. Only the cost of security was by Her Majesty's Treasury. The British logo for the Diamond Jubilee was selected through a contest held by the BBC children's programme Blue Peter; the winning design, announced in February 2011, was created by ten-year-old Katherine Dewar.

==== Extended weekend ====
On 5 January 2010, the Lord President of the Council and Business Secretary Peter Mandelson announced that an extra bank holiday would take place on 5 June 2012. Moving the Spring Bank Holiday (the last Monday in May) to 4 June resulted in a four-day holiday in honour of the Diamond Jubilee. As national holidays are a devolved matter, Scotland's first minister confirmed that the bank holiday would be held on 5 June in Scotland. Some economists later theorised that the holiday could reduce the country's gross domestic product by 0.5% in the second quarter of the year, though this would be partially offset by increased sales for the hospitality and merchandise sectors.

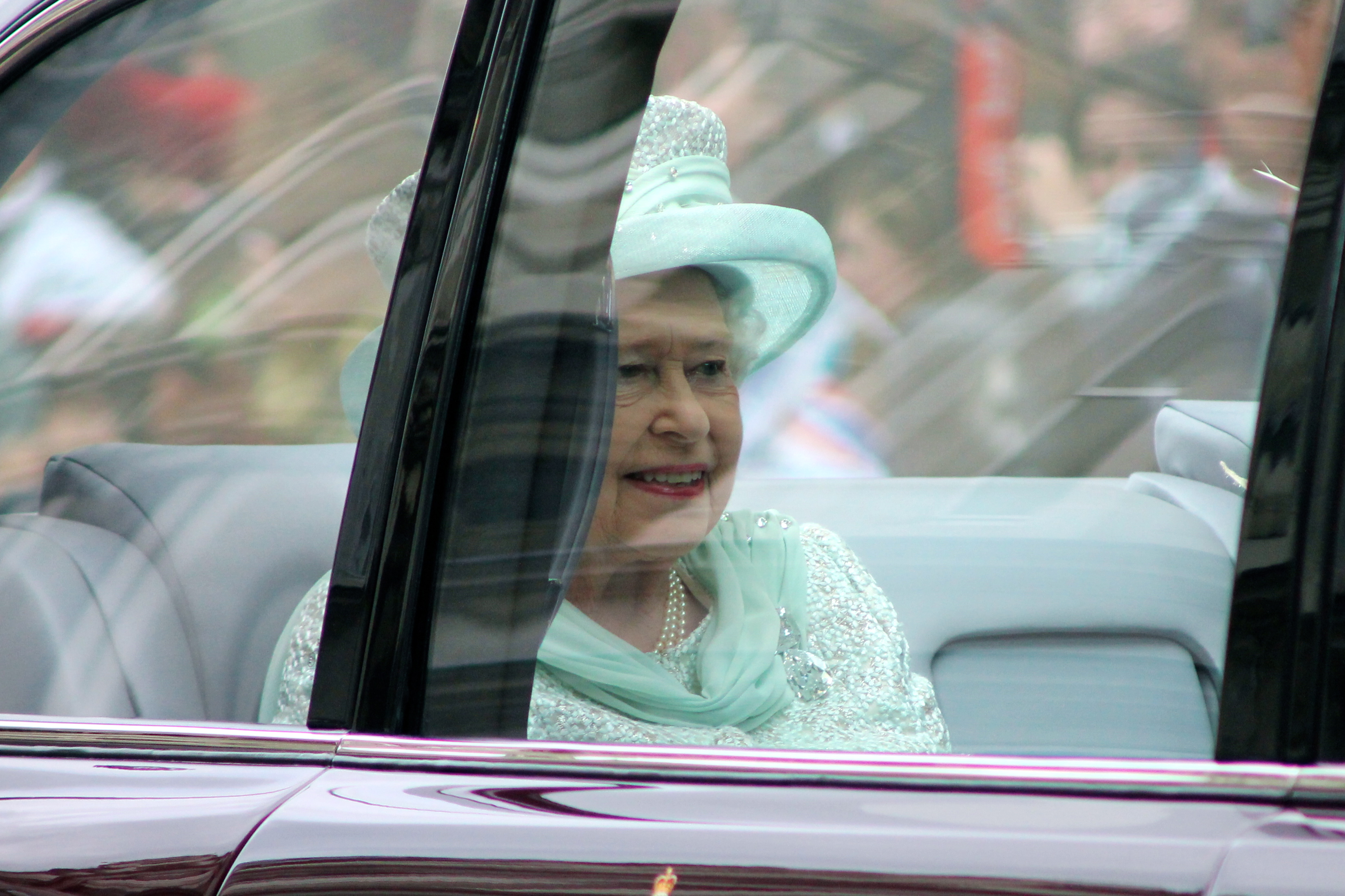
The Queen travelling by car to St Paul's Cathedral for the service of thanksgiving on 5 June

Many events were staged in London during the bank holiday weekend. The River Thames Diamond Jubilee Pageant was held on 3 June; a maritime parade of 1,000 boats from around the Commonwealth—the largest flotilla seen on the river in 350 years—together with other celebrations along the river banks. Heavy rain started during the event and the commemorative airforce flyover at the end was cancelled due to very low cloud base and bad visibility at ground level. Along with almost all members of the royal family, various governors-general from the Commonwealth realms other than the UK were in attendance. The Diamond Jubilee Concert, with a preceding afternoon picnic in the palace gardens for the 10,000 concert ticket holders, was held the following day, in front of Buckingham Palace, and featured acts representing each decade of the Queen's 60-year reign.

Street parties were permitted to take place across the country. Special community lottery grants, called The Jubilee People's Millions, were being offered by the Big Lottery Fund and ITV.

Members of the royal family, governors-general, and prime ministers from the Commonwealth realms were present at various functions held on 4 and 5 June: A reception took place at Buckingham Palace before the Diamond Jubilee Concert and a national service of thanksgiving was conducted the following day at St Paul's Cathedral, also attended by 2,000 other guests. Will Todd's anthem "The Call of Wisdom", commissioned specially for this event, was performed by the Diamond Choir, made up of about 40 children from around the UK. The Archbishop of Canterbury, Rowan Williams, dedicated his sermon to the Queen, during which he noted her "lifelong dedication" and stated that she "has made her 'public' happy and all the signs are that she is herself happy, fulfilled and at home in these encounters." Afterwards, a formal lunch was held in Westminster Hall. The Queen returned to Buckingham Palace at 2:20 pm, in an open top carriage procession and escorted by the Household Cavalry Regiment. Another reception was held at London's Guildhall and a luncheon took place at Lancaster House, hosted by the British Secretary of State for Foreign and Commonwealth Affairs. A reception solely for governors-general was held by the Queen at Buckingham Palace.

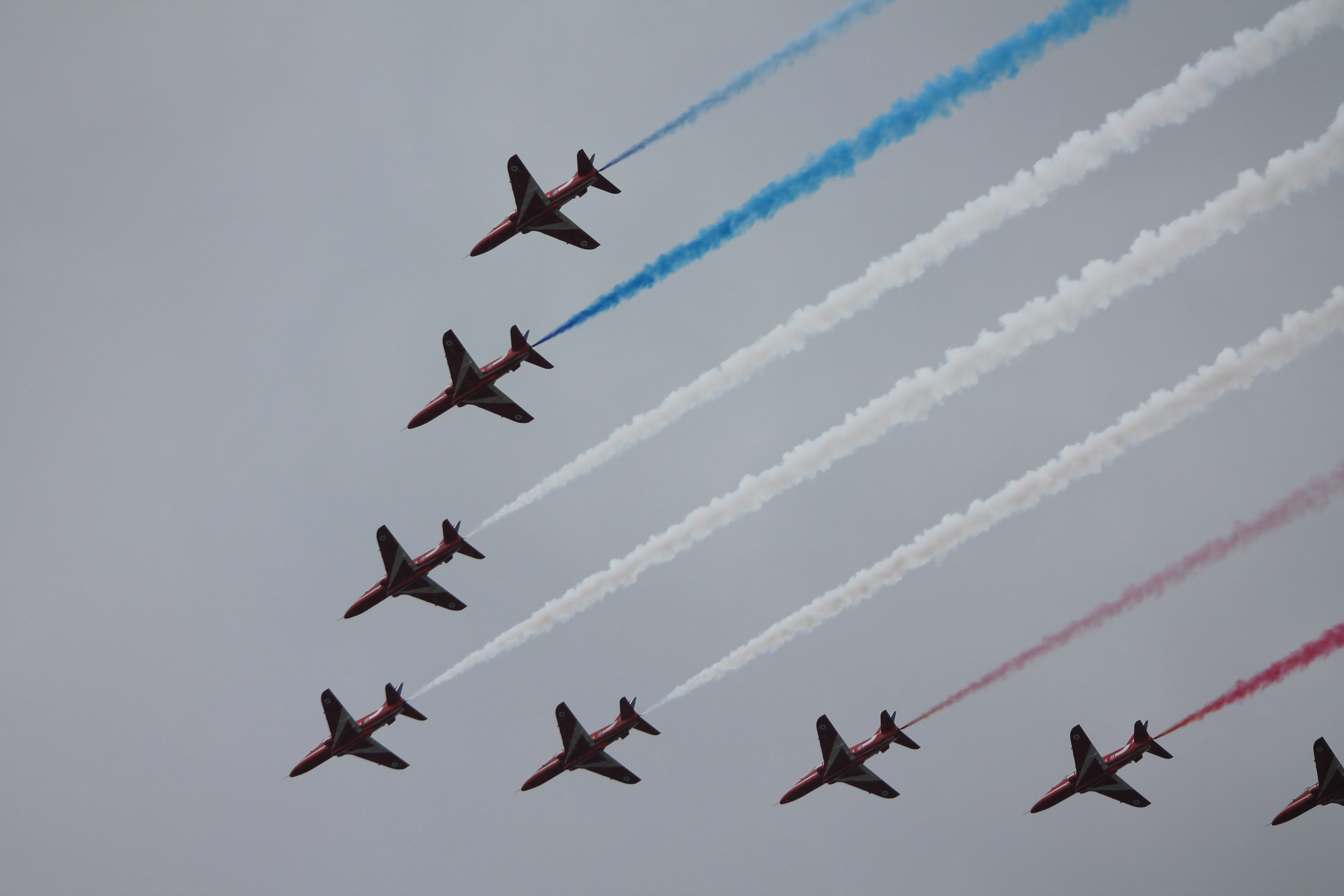
Flypast by the Red Arrows over Buckingham Palace on 5 June

The weekend of celebrations ended with a balcony appearance at Buckingham Palace. The Queen appeared on the balcony with the Prince of Wales, the Duchess of Cornwall, the Duke of Cambridge, the Duchess of Cambridge, and Prince Harry in front of cheering crowds outside the palace and along The Mall. There followed a feu de joie and a flypast by the Red Arrows and historic aircraft, including PA474, the last airworthy Lancaster bomber in Britain. Several media commentators commented on the significance of only senior members of the royal family appearing on the balcony. BBC royal correspondent Peter Hunt remarked that it "sent a message demonstrating both continuity and restraint at a time of austerity".

==== Permanent tributes ====
While the sands of culture shift and the tides of politics ebb and flow, Her Majesty has been a permanent anchor, bracing Britain against the storms, grounding us in certainty. Crucially, simultaneously, she has moved the monarchy forward. It has been said that the art of progress is to preserve order amid change and change amid order, and in this the Queen is unparalleled. She has never shut the door on the future; instead, she has led the way through it, ushering in the television cameras, opening up the royal collection and the palaces and hosting receptions and award ceremonies for every area of public life. It is easy now to take these things for granted, but we should remember that they were her initiatives. She was broadcasting to the nation every Christmas day 30 years before we let cameras into this House.

— David Cameron, Prime Minister of the United Kingdom, 2012

To mark the jubilee, the Queen bestowed Royal Borough status on Greenwich, in southeast London. In addition, a competition was held to grant in 2012 city status to towns and either a lord mayoralty or lord provostship to one city. (Note: The towns that bid for city status were: Bolton, Bournemouth, Chelmsford, Colchester, Coleraine, Corby, Craigavon, Croydon, Doncaster, Dorchester, Dudley, Dumfries, Gateshead, Goole, Luton, Medway, Middlesbrough, Milton Keynes, Perth, Reading, Southend, St Asaph, St Austell, Stockport, Tower Hamlets, and Wrexham. The cities that bid for a Lord Mayoralty or Lord Provostship were: Armagh, Cambridge, Derby, Gloucester, Lancaster, Newport, Peterborough, Salford, Southampton, St Albans, Sunderland, and Wakefield.) City status was awarded to Chelmsford in England, Perth in Scotland and St Asaph in Wales. Armagh, Northern Ireland, was awarded the Lord Mayoralty.

The Olympic Park in East London, created for the 2012 London Olympics, was named the Queen Elizabeth Olympic Park following the Olympics. The Queen Elizabeth II Fields Challenge (Queen Elizabeth Fields Challenge in Scotland) was a project of the charity Fields in Trust to safeguard parks and green spaces as public recreation land in perpetuity for future generations to enjoy, and to provide a permanent legacy of the Diamond Jubilee and the Olympics. The Woodland Trust planned to establish 60 Jubilee woodlands during 2011 and 2012, one of almost 500 acres – Flagship Diamond Wood, Leicestershire – and the remainder 60 acres each.

A stained glass window, paid for by MPs and members of the House of Lords, was unveiled in the Queen's presence at Westminster Hall in March 2012. In addition, a majority of MPs endorsed the renaming of the clock tower of Westminster Palace that houses Big Ben, to the Elizabeth Tower.

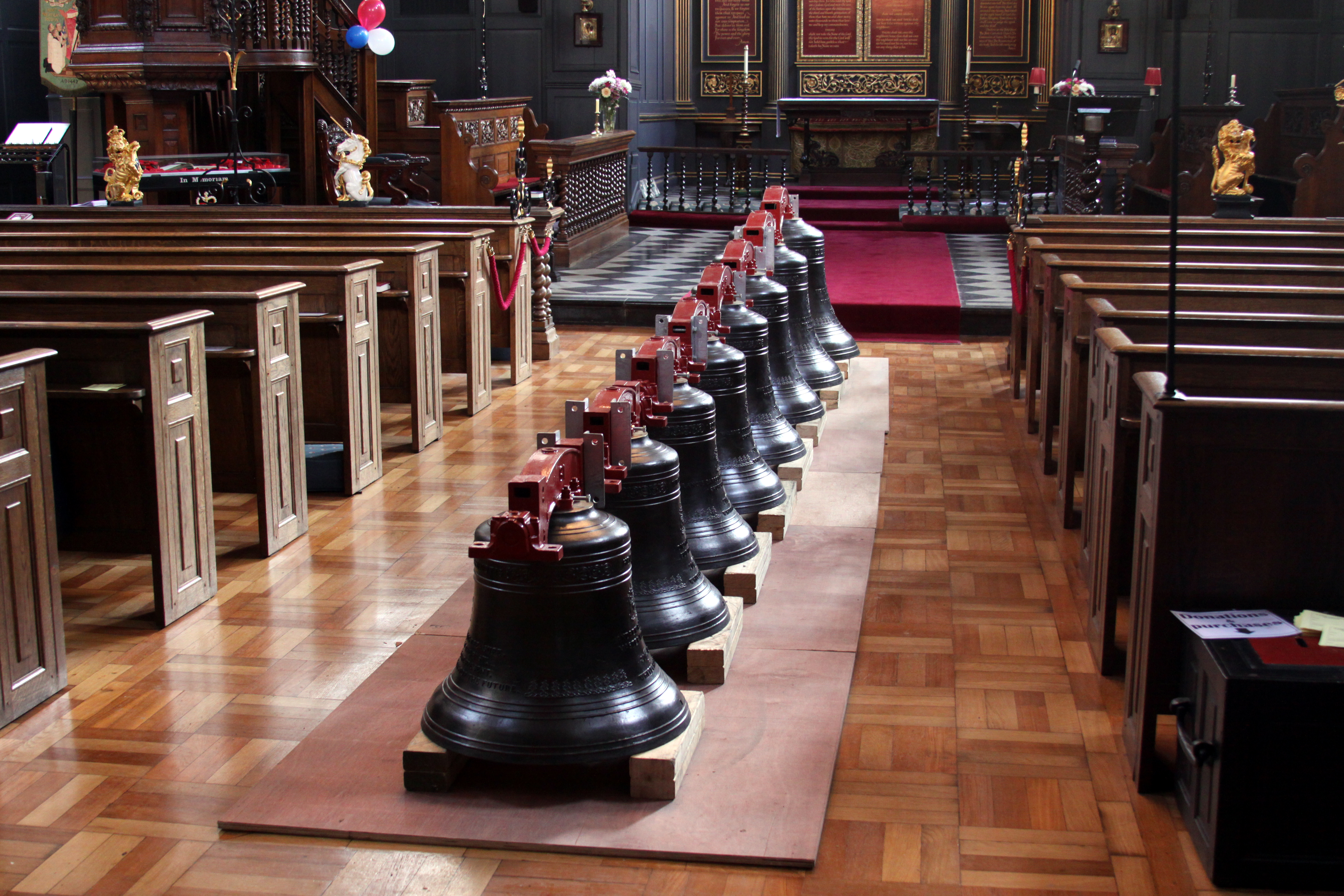
The Royal Jubilee Bells in St James Garlickhythe before being hung in the church's tower

The Royal Jubilee Bells, made for the Jubilee and a feature of the Thames Diamond Jubilee Pageant, were delivered to the church of St James Garlickhythe in the City of London on 15 June 2012 and arranged along the central aisle. They were dedicated by the Rt Revd John Waine on Sunday 17 June and hanging commenced in the tower shortly thereafter. They were rung for the first time in the church on 4 July.

The Royal Mint issued a number of coins including an official £5 coin, a 5oz coin and a kilo coin. A five-pound sterling silver coin was issued by the Government of Gibraltar to mark the occasion.

In October 2012 it was announced that the Queen would bestow the honorary title of Regius Professorship to up to six university chairs in the United Kingdom, to recognise "excellence in teaching and research"; the number was chosen to represent the decades of the Queen's reign. The full list was announced on 29 January 2013 and comprised twelve new chairs, in recognition of the "exceptionally high quality" of the departments considered.

Kew Gardens announced that the Main Gate, the entrance to the gardens from Kew Green, was to be renamed Elizabeth Gate in honour of the Queen. Princess Alexandra attended the naming ceremony on 21 October 2012.

On 18 December 2012, the British Foreign Office announced that a portion of the British Antarctic Territory was to be named Queen Elizabeth Land in honour of Her Majesty in her diamond jubilee year.

A seemingly less permanent tribute that gained widespread popularity was a work provided by street artist Banksy. His "Slave Labour" stencil on a north London wall offered pointed criticism of the jubilee celebrations and the conditions that support British nationalism. The mural's removal and subsequent attempted sale at auction in February 2013 sparked international controversy, highlighting the piece's worth to local and regional residents. Its title, perhaps coincidentally, conjured another contentious part of the celebrations where unemployed workers, bussed into London on an allegedly unpaid trial to staff security for the event, were made to work under what some described as "appalling" conditions.

In 2013, a bust of the Queen was installed in the Bexleyheath Clock Tower to commemorate the Diamond Jubilee of Queen Elizabeth II. The clock tower was originally built in 1912 to commemorate the coronation of George V.

==== Other events ====
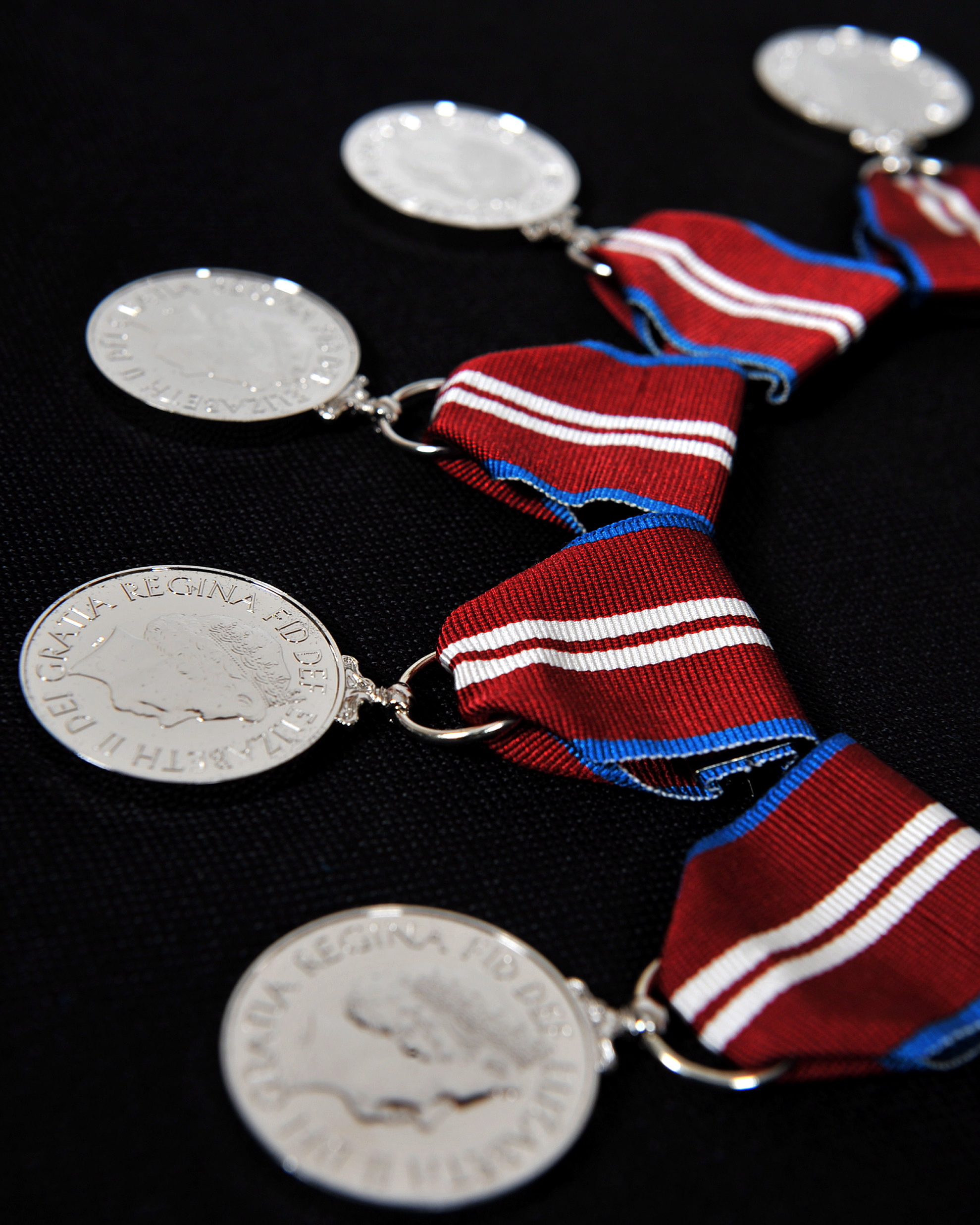
Diamond Jubilee medals

On Accession Day, 6 February, a 62-gun salute was mounted on the banks of the River Thames, near the Tower of London and the Queen made a visit to Norfolk, one of the first places the monarch visited after acceding to the throne. Later in the month, Queen Elizabeth attended a multi-faith (Bahá'í, Buddhist, Christian, Hindu, Jain, Jewish, Muslim, Sikh, and Zoroastrian) reception held at the residence of the Archbishop of Canterbury, Lambeth Palace, in honour of the jubilee.

The Queen addressed both houses of parliament in Westminster Hall on 20 March 2012. Also in March, the Royal Commonwealth Society launched the Jubilee Time Capsule to mark the jubilee. The BBC and Andrew Marr created the television documentary The Diamond Queen, in which various members of the royal family and current and former politicians spoke about the sovereign and her life. The documentary was criticised by the campaign group Republic, which argued that it breached BBC guidelines on impartiality.

At Buckingham Palace, a display of the Queen's diamonds was opened to the public. On 4 June, the bells in each of the 34 church bell towers along the River Welland valley rang in succession, ending with the ringing of the bell at Fosdyke 60 times.

On 19 May, the Queen attended the Diamond Jubilee Armed Forces Parade and Muster, the British Armed Forces' own tribute to the monarch, in Windsor Castle and nearby Home Park. The first time all three services had assembled for the Queen for such an event at the same time, it featured military reviews and a 2,500 strong military parade through the town, as well as a military flypast featuring 78 aircraft.

A Nowka Bais competition in Oxford was dedicated to the Diamond Jubilee. The Queen issued a statement on the event and expressed her interest about the Bengali sporting tradition to the event organisers.

==== Overseas territories ====
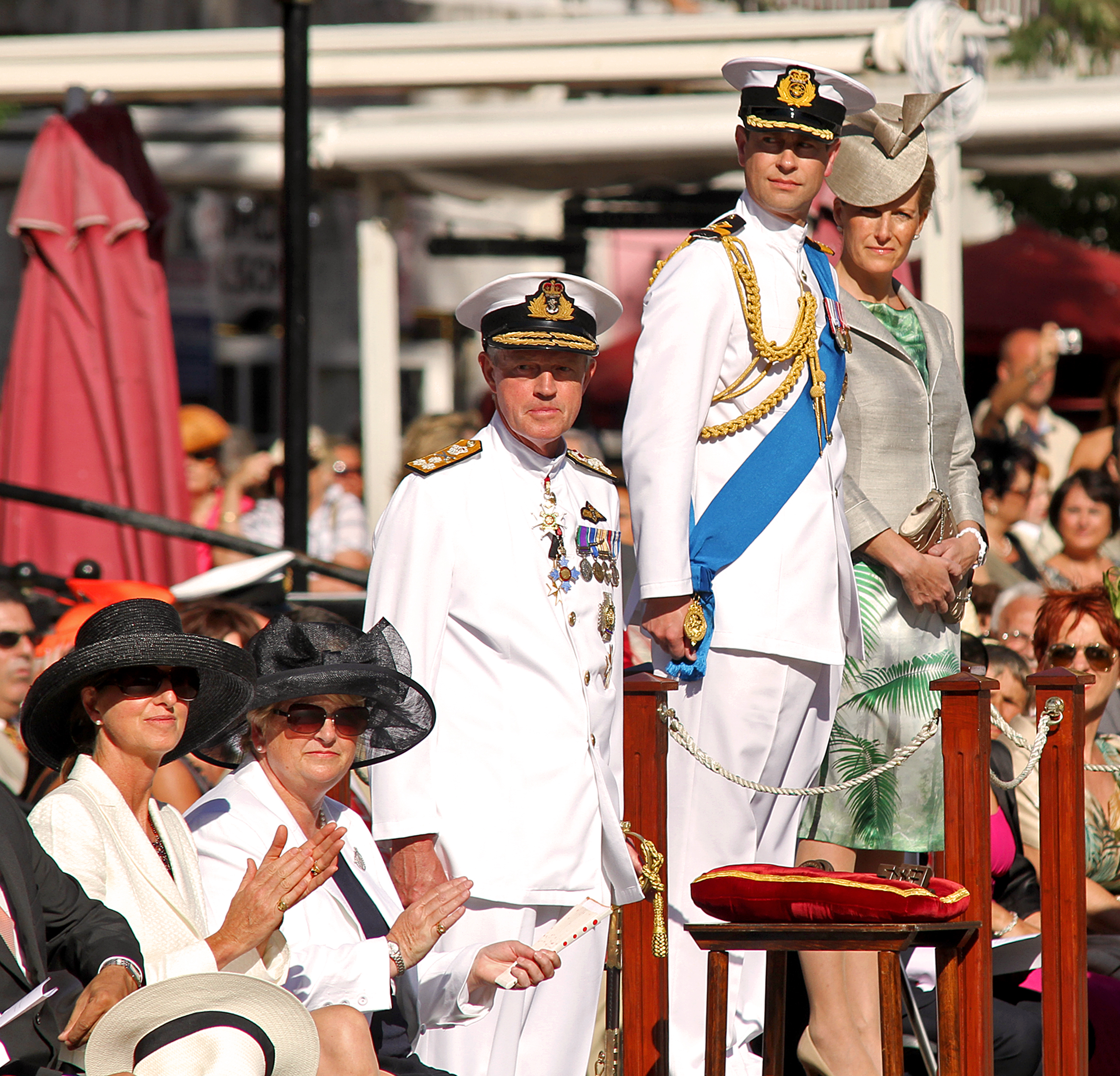
The Earl and Countess of Wessex at the Queen's Birthday Parade, Grand Casemates Square, Gibraltar, June 2012

Prince Richard, Duke of Gloucester, toured the British Virgin Islands (BVI) in March 2012. On Montserrat, he met participants in the Sailability BVI programme, including Special Olympics medallists, and staff and associates of the Eslyn Henley Ritchie Learning Centre, BVI Technical and Vocational Institute, BVI Services, and the Department of Youth Affairs and Sports.

Prince Edward, Earl of Wessex, and Sophie, Countess of Wessex, visited the British Overseas Territory of Gibraltar, between 11 and 13 June 2012, and Montserrat. The Spanish Ministry of Foreign Affairs and Cooperation expressed "upset and concern" about the couple's tour of Gibraltar, which Spain claims as Spanish territory.

=== Other realms ===
Prince William, Duke of Cambridge, and Catherine, Duchess of Cambridge, visited the Solomon Islands and Tuvalu.

The Queen's realms throughout the Caribbean and West Indies planned a number of Diamond Jubilee events. Using RFA Fort Rosalie, Prince Edward, Earl of Wessex, and Sophie, Countess of Wessex, visited other Caribbean realms, including: Antigua and Barbuda, Grenada, Montserrat and Saint Lucia.

== Other Commonwealth countries ==
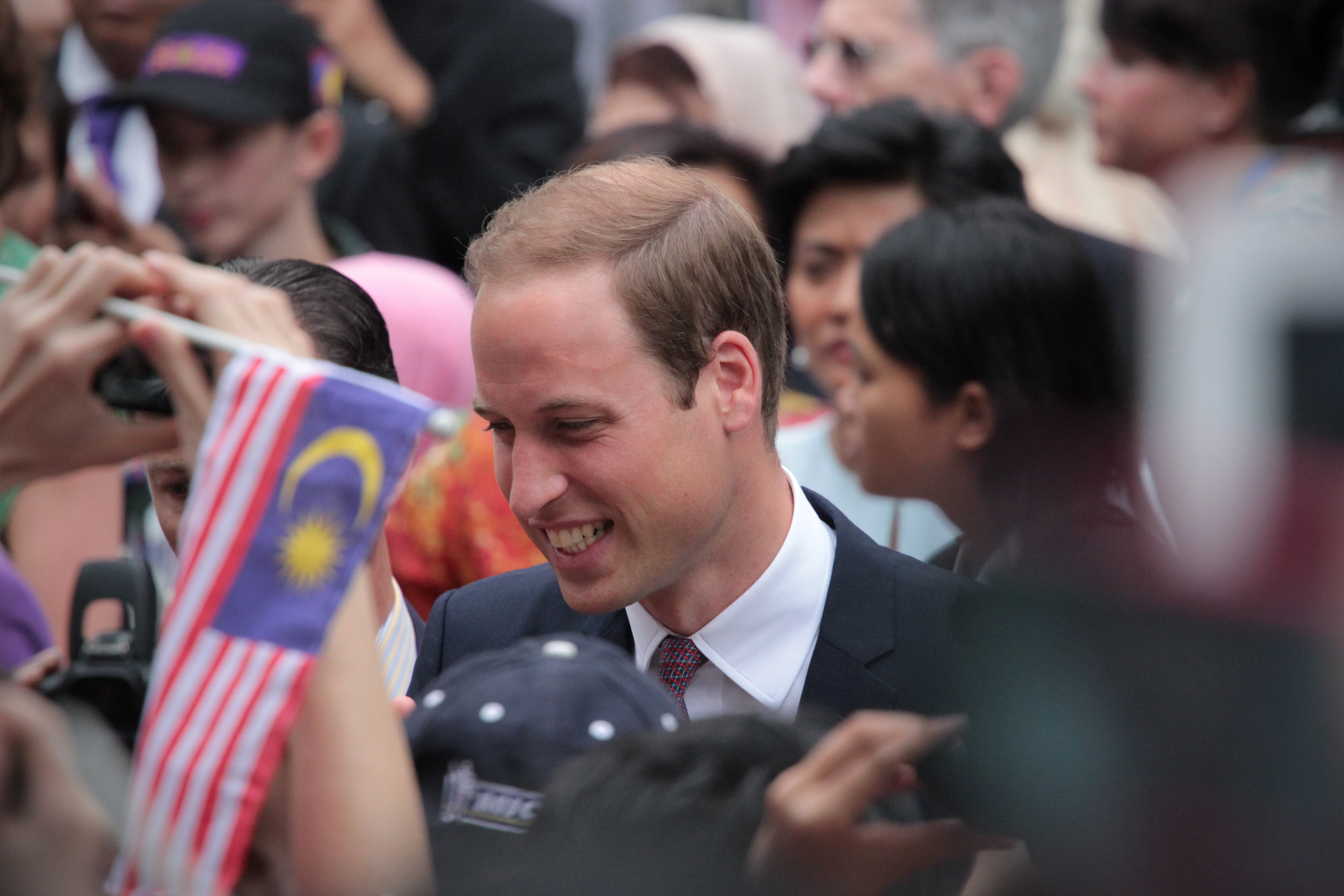
The Duke of Cambridge in Malaysia as part of a tour to mark the Queen's Diamond Jubilee, September 2012

Visits were planned by Princess Anne to Zambia and Mozambique, while the Duke of Gloucester made official visits to Uganda and Malta. In Asia, Prince Andrew, Duke of York, visited India, while Prince William and Catherine, the Duke and Duchess of Cambridge, visited Malaysia, Singapore, Solomon Islands and Tuvalu.

Prince Edward, Earl of Wessex, and Sophie, Countess of Wessex, visited Trinidad and Tobago, as did Governor General of Canada David Johnston.

=== India ===
The British High Commission in Delhi held a large Jubilee reception, which the Duke of York also attended. Children took a ride on an elephant named Rupa draped in the Union Jack, during the Jubilee events in New Delhi. The British Jubilee Tea Party received high amounts of media coverage, so also did Rupa the elephant.

=== Kenya ===
In Nairobi, the High Commission commemorated the Queen's Diamond Jubilee by lighting a beacon at Treetops Lodge, the location where Princess Elizabeth learned of her father's death and her immediate accession to the throne in 1952. The celebrations also featured items such as the car used by the Queen in 1952 and an exhibition featuring radio broadcasts and photographs from that time.

=== Pakistan ===
In Pakistan, the British High Commission organised an event with local school children, in which they buried a time capsule, to be dug out on 25 years later. The children were asked to draw about their families, community, country, and connections between the United Kingdom and Pakistan. Coins, newspapers, magazines, and pictures of Pakistani landmarks with signatures and messages for the Queen by the children were also put in the time capsule. The event received a lot of positive media coverage.

=== South Africa ===
The Princess Royal visited South Africa in April to mark the jubilee.

The British Consulate in Cape Town, in conjunction with the Hout Bay and Llandudno Heritage Trust, hosted a firing of ancient muzzle-loading cannons at East Fort in Hout Bay. The Hout Bay and Llandudno Heritage Trust restored the Fort's original Swedish made 18-pounder muzzle-loading cannons, dating from 1752, and fired two rolling salvo salutes, of six cannon shots each, in the Queen's honour and each representing a decade of her reign. Members of the public were also invited to join in lighting of a Jubilee Beacon. The South African Navy Band was in attendance and the guns were fired by VIPs who were guided by gunners of the "Honourable Order of Hout Bay Artillerymen".

At the Victoria and Alfred Waterfront of the Port of Cape Town, a flotilla from the Royal Cape Yacht Club sailed past the Hildebrand Ristorante and into-the Victoria Basin and the Cape Town Highlanders marched from Ferrymans to Nobel Square. British Consul General Chris Trott lit a beacon, followed by a further six-gun salute and both South African national anthem and "God Save the Queen".

== Other areas ==
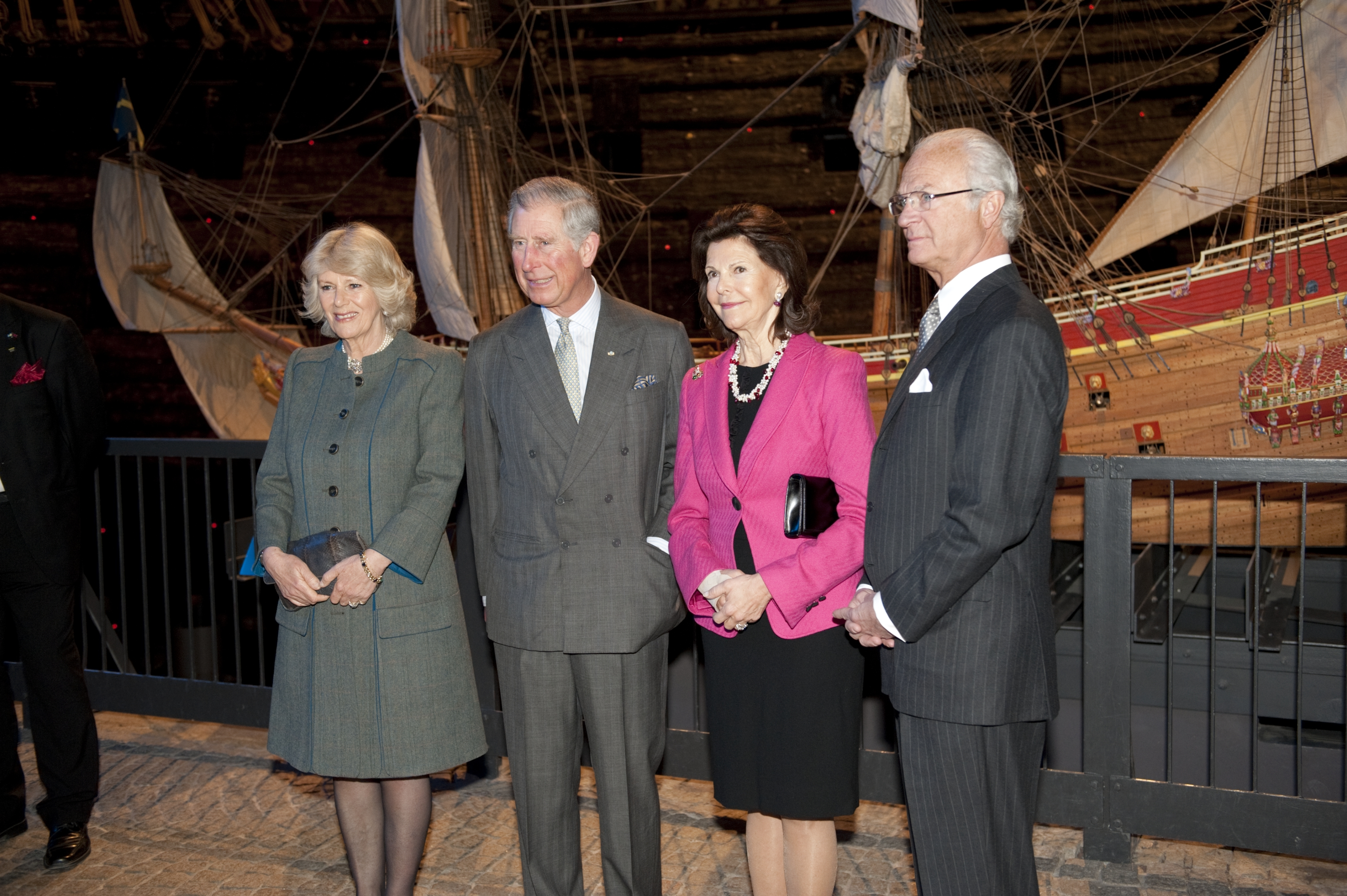
Charles and Camilla with the King and Queen of Sweden during the Diamond Jubilee tour of Scandinavia.

In March 2012, the Prince of Wales and the Duchess of Cornwall visited Norway, Sweden, and Denmark as part of the Diamond Jubilee tour of Scandinavia.

=== Belgium ===
On 5 June 2012, about 500 eminent personalities from various fields gathered in Brussels on the island in Bois de la Cambre to celebrate the Queen's Jubilee. A ferry transported guests to the island, which showcased British brands and products. This was followed by a visit from HMS Edinburgh.

=== Brazil ===
The British Embassy held a Jubilee week in São Paulo and Brasília, with prominent areas in both cities being dressed with Union flags. Cultural exhibitions were set up and images (60 photos for 60 years) and films, highlighting the Royal visits to Brazil, were showcased. There were many activities for children, including making model boats for a mini-flotilla and a Big Jubilee Lunch. Local cinemas and restaurants showed Jubilee-themed films and served special Jubilee dishes.

=== Hong Kong ===
Hong Kong, a British dependent territory until 1997 and the most populous one, had The Big Jubilee Lunch on 3 June 2012, organised by the Royal Commonwealth Society in Hong Kong. On 5 June 2012, there was a service of thanksgiving at the territory's Anglican Cathedral Church of St. John the Evangelist.

=== Italy ===
The Embassy in Rome and Consulate in Milan held multiple events to celebrate the Queen's Diamond Jubilee, including UK-Italy in the pages of Corriere della Sera, an exhibition organised by Fondazione Corriere della Sera and the British Council. It was held from 7 June to 21 June in Milan. A multimedia Symphonic concert was held by the Orchestra Italiana del Cinema with the support of the Regional Council of Lazio, which was dedicated to British and Italian cinematography. A documentary series on the royal family, titled 'London Calling', was broadcast by BBC Knowledge. Milan also used their Jubilee activity to supplement events highlighting high end British jewellery design.

=== Japan ===
In Tokyo, the British Embassy hosted a Vivienne Westwood collection launch to commemorate the Queen's Diamond Jubilee. The event was attended by 800 guests, where they saw the World Premiere of Vivienne Westwood's 2012-13 spring summer collection fashion show. There was a display of 13 British manufactured cars and motorbikes worth £1.3 million. In a surprise guest appearance, Tomoyasu Hotei played his signature tune from Kill Bill. The garden marquee provided a special Jubilee menu of the finest British food and drink. The event was featured on Japan's premier evening and breakfast news shows, reaching an estimated audience of 21.5 million viewers.

=== Mexico ===
A series of events were held in Mexico City to celebrate the Queen's Diamond Jubilee. The British Embassy held a reception showcasing British brands, the BBC provided Diamond Jubilee programming, and Wedgewood and Twinings set up a British Tea House experience. The reception was attended by over 1000 guests and the Ambassador gave a number of interviews around the Jubilee and events both in the UK and Mexico.

=== United Arab Emirates ===
In the UAE, a number of events were held to celebrate the Queen's Diamond Jubilee. In Abu Dhabi, the British Embassy held a 'Great British Car Rally', the first of its kind in the UAE. The Rally, which was organised by the embassy and the Yas Marina Circuit, started at the embassy in Abu Dhabi at 6pm, and travelled along Abu Dhabi's Corniche en route to the Yas Marina Circuit, where the participants first did a loop of the F1 race track before mixing and mingling at a reception at the Circuit's main pit garages. At the reception, the guests were shown the Rolls-Royce that the Queen travelled in during her first visit to the UAE in 1979.

Various glimpses of the Great British Car Rally

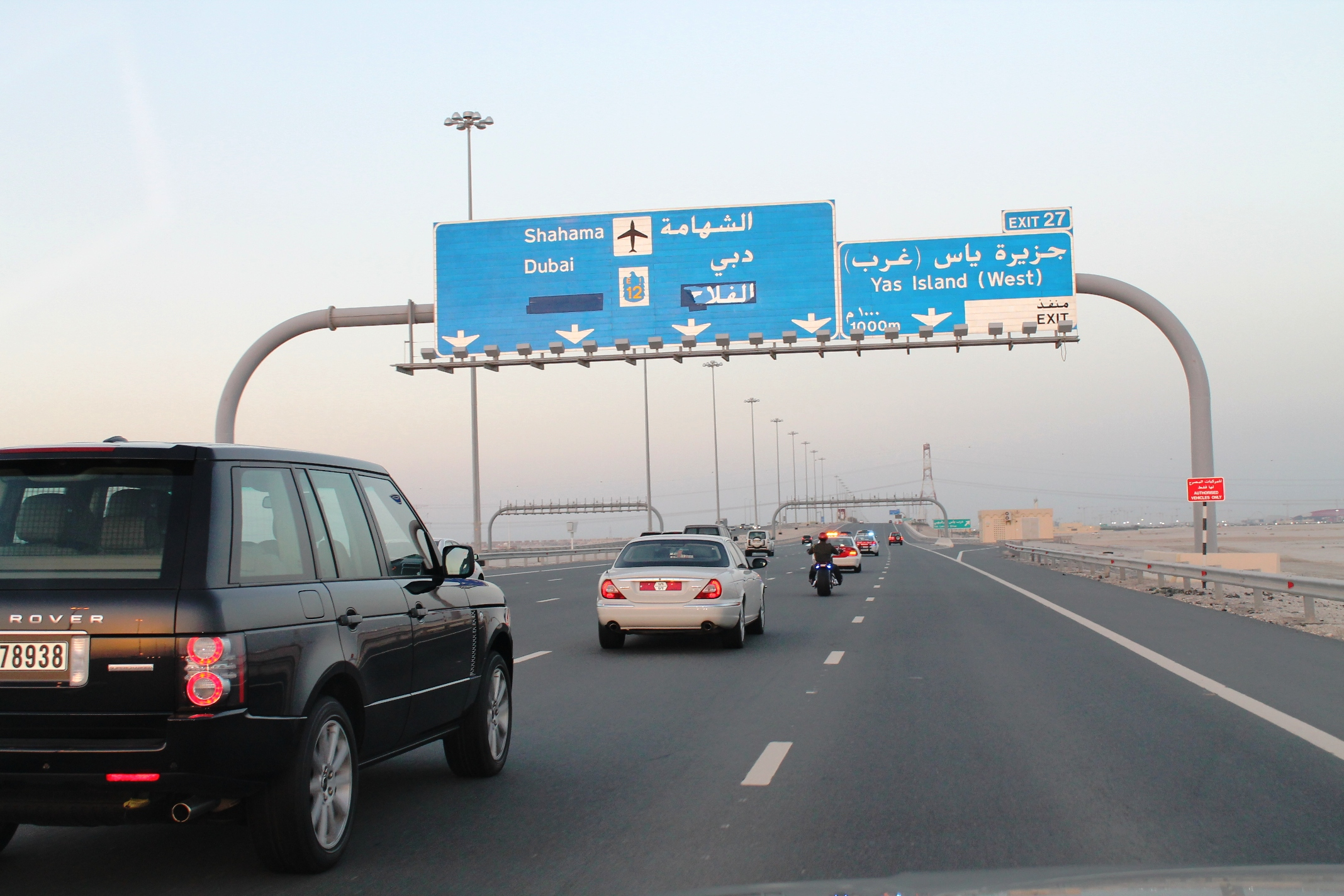

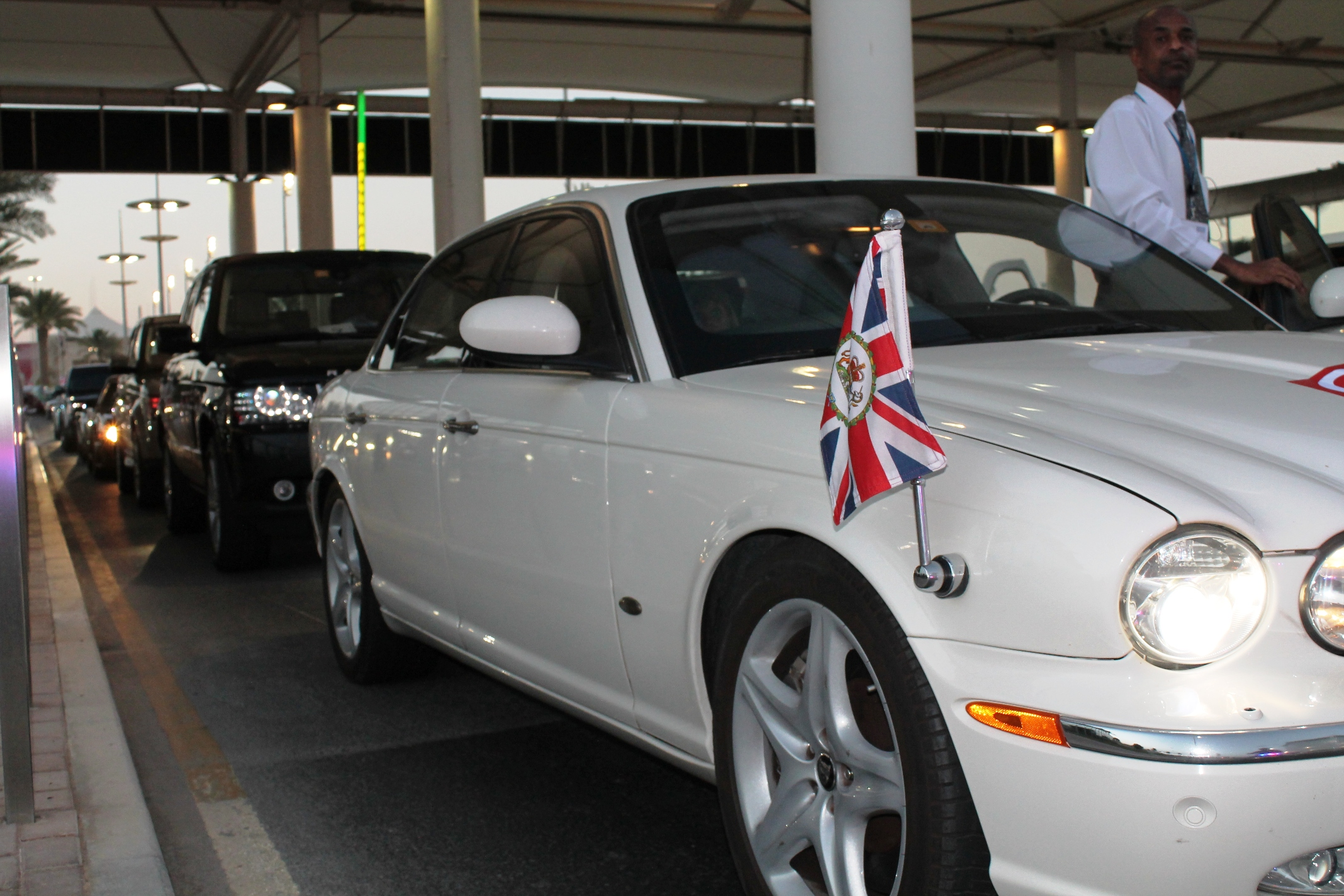

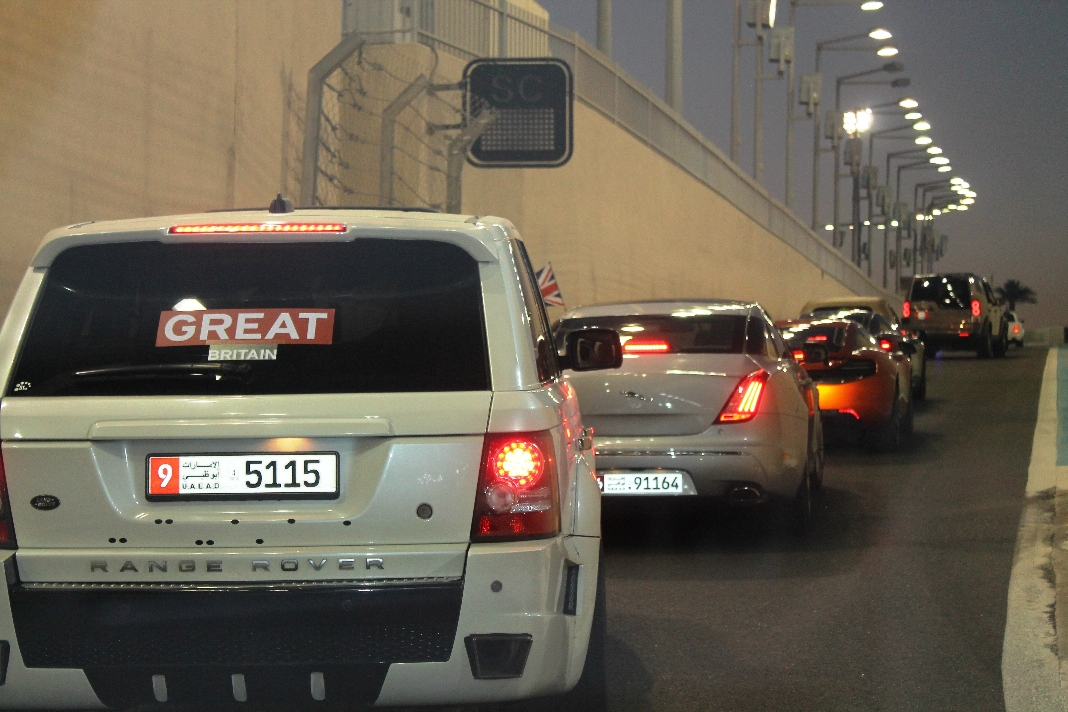

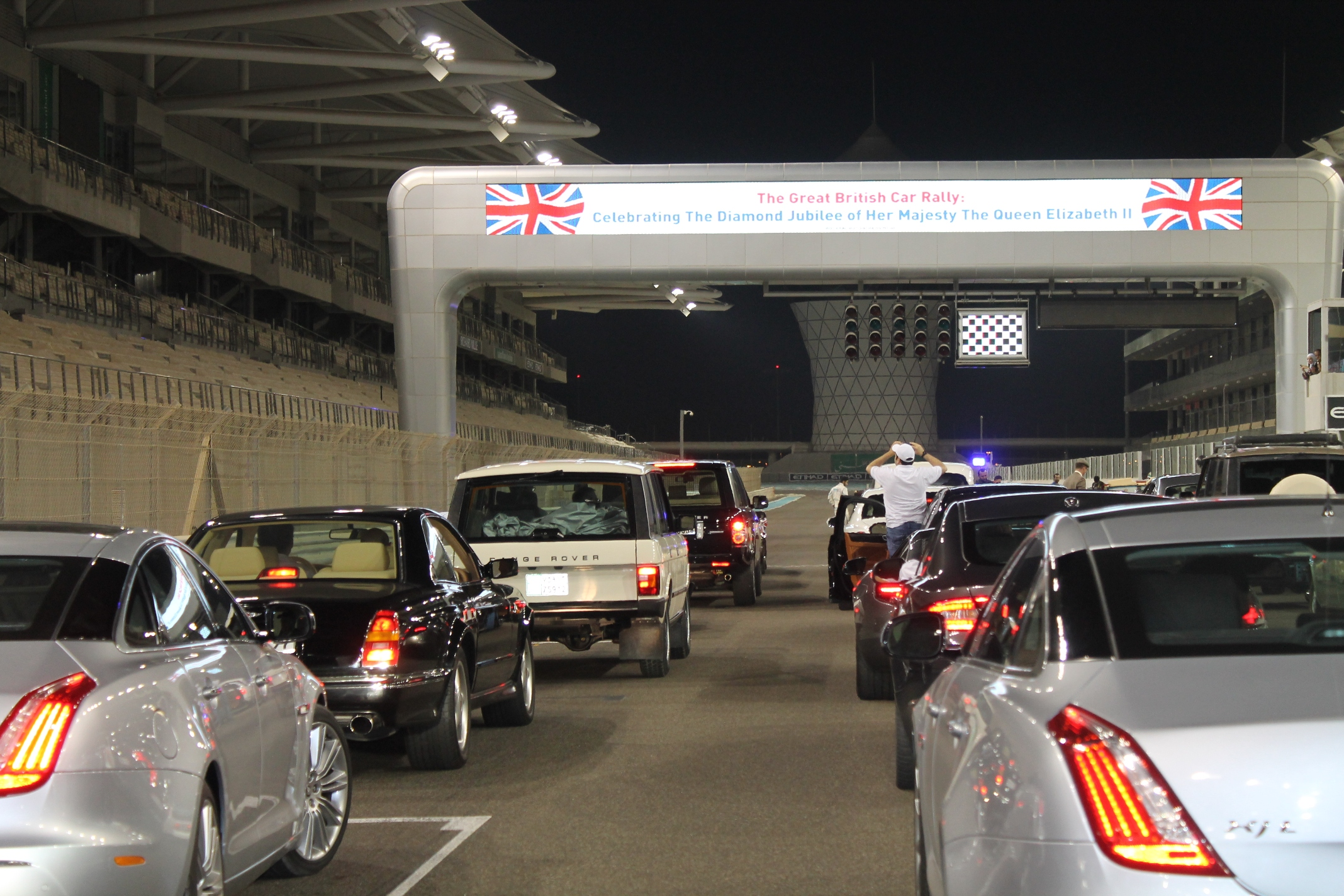

The embassy in Dubai opened up its lawns up to the British and International community who then picnicked there. The people also saw the live transmission of the Diamond Jubilee Pageant down the River Thames. The Dubai Offshore Sailing Club held a "Jubilee Pursuit Race", to mark the Queen's Jubilee.

=== United States ===
President Obama's message for the Diamond Jubilee of Queen Elizabeth II

In a video message, President Barack Obama offered the Queen the "heartfelt congratulations of the American people" on the occasion of her Diamond Jubilee, and said that the Queen was a "living witness" to the power of the Special Relationship between the US and UK, and the "chief source of its resilience." He added, "May the light of Your Majesty's crown continue to reign supreme for many years to come".

In New York City, around 700 people were invited to run through Central Park for six kilometers, one for every decade of her reign on 31 May. The run raised $14,000 for two charities: St. George's Society and Disabled Sports USA. Sex and the City star Kim Cattrall started the race and the music was provided by a Beatles tribute band called "Britishmania".

=== Uzbekistan ===
The British Embassy in Tashkent, Uzbekistan celebrated the Queen's Diamond Jubilee with a Big Jubilee Lunch on 1 June 2012. The embassy also used the example of the Queen to engage with businesswomen, who were having an increasingly important impact on the Uzbek economy but remain unrecognised.

== See also ==
- Queen Elizabeth II Diamond Jubilee Medal
- 2012 Diamond Jubilee Honours
- Silver Jubilee of Elizabeth II
- Ruby Jubilee of Elizabeth II
- Golden Jubilee of Elizabeth II
- Sapphire Jubilee of Elizabeth II
- Platinum Jubilee of Elizabeth II
- List of monarchs in Britain by length of reign
- List of jubilees of British monarchs
