= Sappho 44 =

Fragment of a poem by Sappho

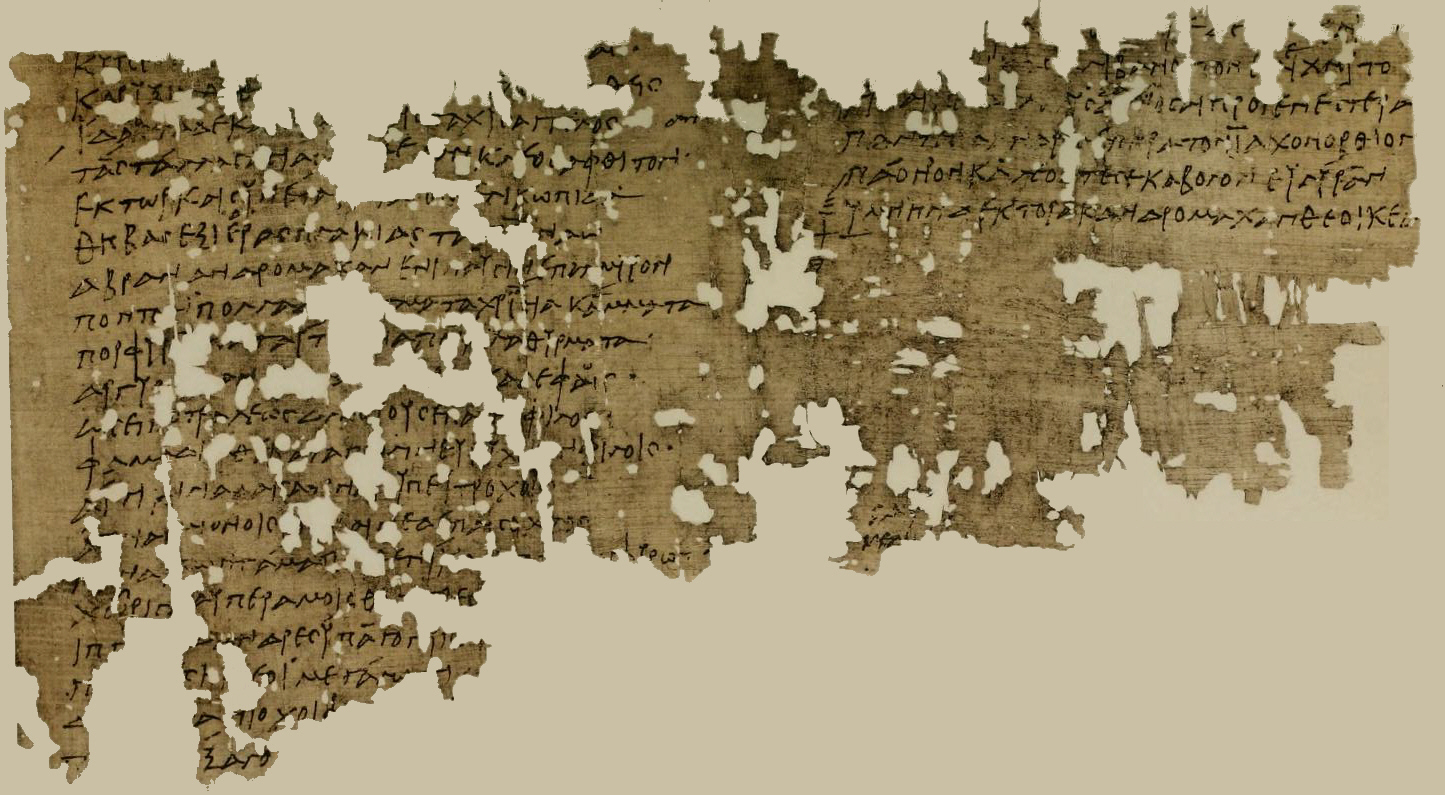
Part of Papyrus Oxyrhynchus 1232, the papyrus on which Sappho 44 is preserved.

Sappho 44 is a fragment of a poem by the archaic Greek poet Sappho, which describes the wedding of Hector and Andromache. Preserved on a piece of papyrus found in Egypt, it is the longest of Sappho's surviving fragments, and is written in epic style suiting its subject. The metre is glyconic with double dactylic expansion.

== Preservation ==
The poem was preserved on Papyrus Oxyrhynchus 1232, a fragment of papyrus found at Oxyrhynchus in Egypt and first published in 1914, now in the collection of the Bodleian Library at Oxford University. The papyrus dates to the first half of the third century AD. Fragment 44 is the longest piece of Sappho's poetry preserved. A second papyrus, Papyrus Oxyrhynchus 2076, confirms Sappho's authorship, and shows that the poem came at the end of the second book of the Alexandrian edition of her works; a citation in Athenaeus also supports this attribution.

== Poem ==
The poem's meter is the glyconic with double dactylic expansion (gl^{2d}) – each line is of the form "xx -uu -uu -uu- ux", where "-" denotes a long syllable, "u" a short syllable, and "x" a syllable which could be either long or short. In the Alexandrian edition of Sappho's poems, it was included in Book II.

Sappho's authorship of the poem has been contested. Scholars such as Edgar Lobel and Ulrich von Wilamowitz-Moellendorf have doubted that Sappho wrote the work due to its epic style. However, the poem was accepted as authentic in the Alexandrian edition of Sappho's poetry, and modern scholars generally agree that she wrote the poem.

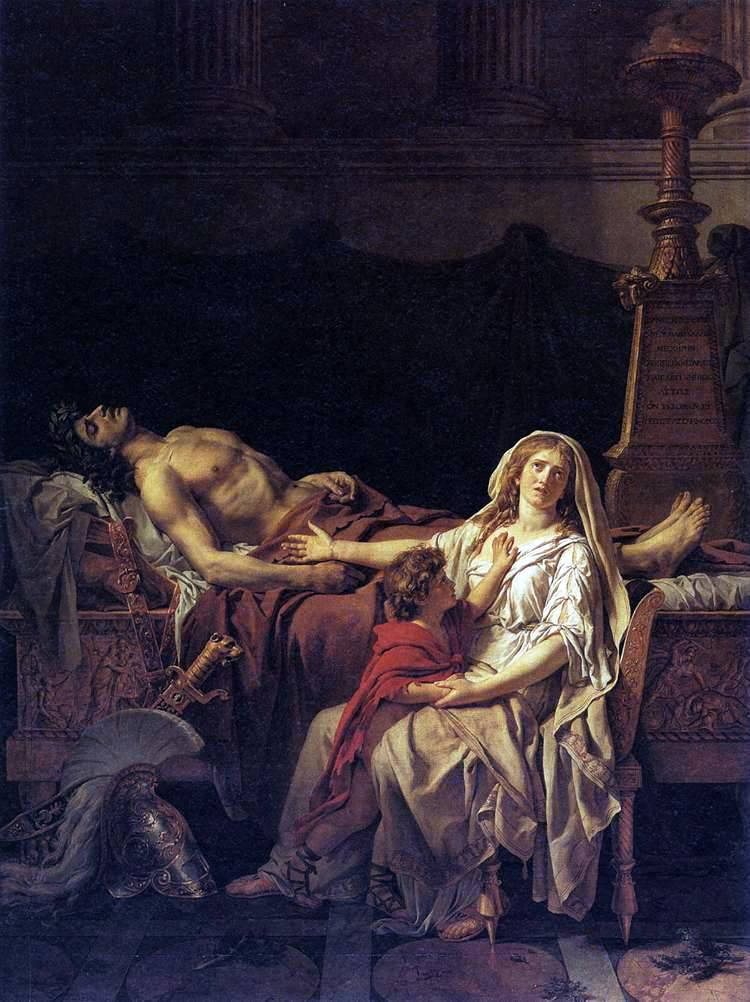
Jacques-Louis David, Andromache Mourning Hector 1783. Sappho 44 tells the story of the marriage of the Trojan hero Hector and his wife Andromache.

Sappho 44 tells the story of the marriage of Hector and Andromache, which is mentioned in Book 22 of the Iliad. It describes Andromache's arrival in Troy, escorted by Hector and watched by the Trojans. The first portion of the poem describes the herald Idaeus announcing the imminent arrival of Hector and Andromache to the city, and the Trojans preparing to greet them. Following this, a portion of the poem – presumably dealing with the arrival of Hector and Andromache – is missing; the length of this missing section is uncertain. The final section describes the wedding celebrations, with music, wine, and the men of Troy singing a hymn to Apollo.

The metre and style of the poem evoke Greek epic, and the poem is often interpreted as an intertext to the Iliad. The Iliad did not have its later status as the canonical epic poem in sixth-century Lesbos, however, and it is difficult to tell how many of the allusions in the poem to the Epic Cycle are specific to the Iliad, rather than being traditional. Adrian Kelly describes the poem's reinterpretation of an epic narrative to foreground the perspective of women as characteristically Sapphic.

The poem may have been written for performance at a wedding. However, as early as 1966, some scholars had begun to question this belief, noting that the story of Hector and Andromache – culminating in the death of Hector and the enslavement of Andromache – is not particularly suitable for a wedding. Lawrence Schrenk argues that the poem specifically alludes to two scenes in the Iliad – firstly, Andromache's seeing Hector's body being dragged from the battlefield and the subsequent flashback to her wedding in Book 22, and secondly, the recovery of Hector's corpse in Book 24.

== Reception ==
Virgil alludes to Sappho 44 in Book 4 of the Aeneid, when discussing Dido's suitors learning of her marriage to Aeneas. The poem has received relatively little scholarly attention, and many scholars consider it not to be one of Sappho's best works. However, Schrenk argues that the poem is more subtle than has often been appreciated.
