= Roman numerals =

Numbers in the Roman numeral system

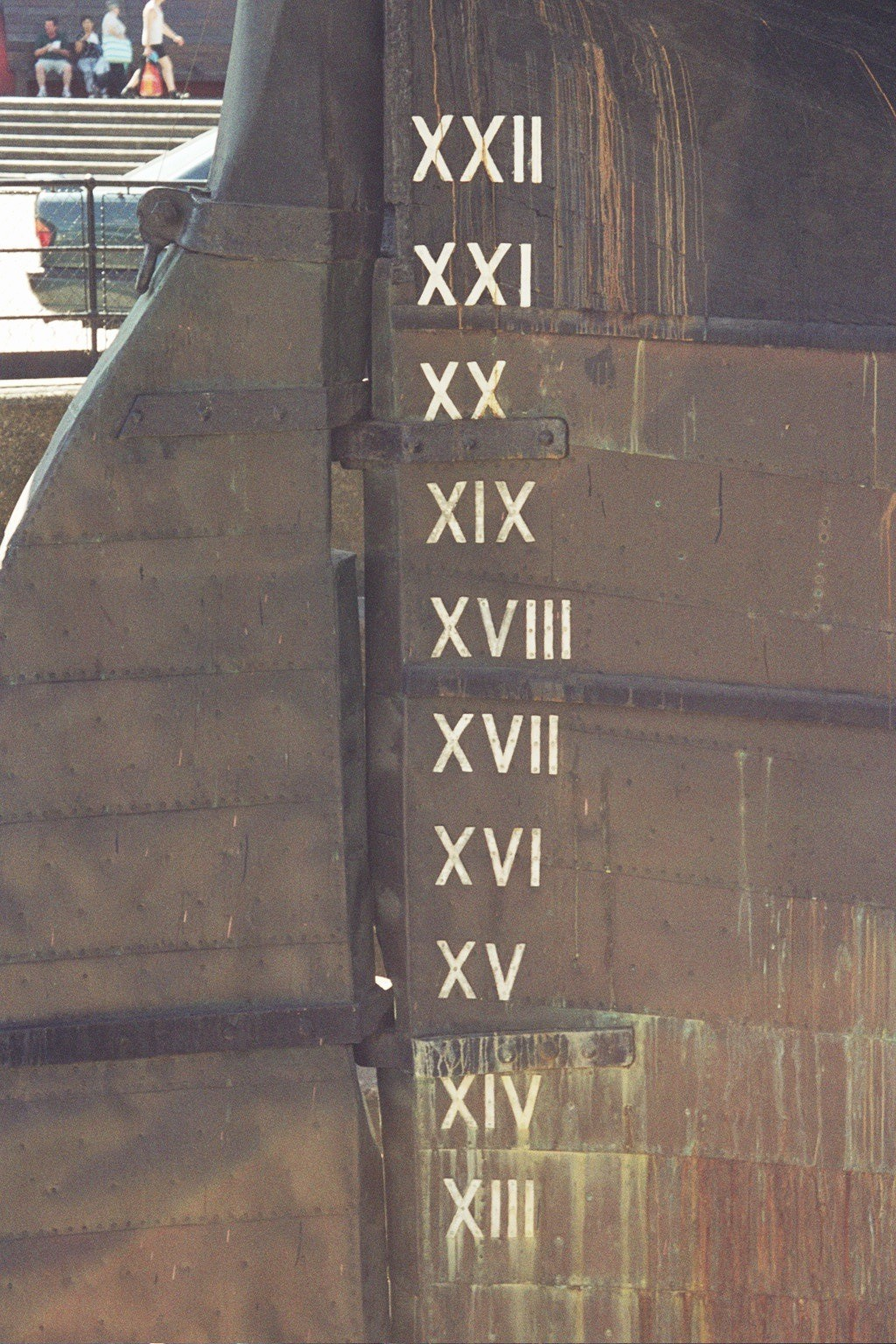
Roman numerals on stern of the ship Cutty Sark showing draught in feet. The numbers range from 13 to 22, from bottom to top.

Roman numerals are a numeral system that originated in ancient Rome and remained the usual way of writing numbers throughout Europe well into the Late Middle Ages. Like many other ancient numeral systems, Roman numerals are based on the additive principle: a number is written by concatenating individual symbols, each representing a fixed value, and the value of the resulting numeral phrase is the sum of the individual values of each letter. The modern style of Roman numerals uses only seven letters from the Latin alphabet as symbols: I meaning 1, V meaning 5, X meaning 10, L meaning 50, C meaning 100, D meaning 500, and M meaning 1000. For example, the Roman numeral XXVII represents the number 10 + 10 + 5 + 1 + 1 = 27. When a smaller numeral symbol precedes a larger one, subtraction is implied; for example, the notation IV represents 5 − 1 = 4 and IX represents 10 − 1 = 9.

The use of Roman numerals has continued long after the decline of the Roman Empire. From the 14th century on, Roman numerals began to be replaced by the positional Hindu–Arabic numeral system; however, this process was gradual, and the use of Roman numerals has persisted in some contexts, such as on clock faces. For instance, on the clock of Big Ben (designed in 1852), the hours from 1 to 12 are written as:

I, II, III, IV, V, VI, VII, VIII, IX, X, XI, XII

Other common uses include year numbers on monuments and buildings and copyright dates on the title screens of films and television programmes. MCM signifies 1000 + 1000 − 100 = 1900, so 1912 is written MCMXII. For the years of the 21st century, MM indicates 2000, so 2026 (the current year) is written MMXXVI.

== Description ==
Roman numerals use different symbols for each power of ten, and there is no zero symbol, in contrast with the place value notation of Arabic numerals (in which place-keeping zeros enable the same digit to represent different powers of ten).

This allows some flexibility in notation, and there has never been an official or universally accepted standard for Roman numerals. Usage varied greatly in ancient Rome and became thoroughly chaotic in medieval times. The more recent restoration of a largely "classical" notation has gained popularity among some, while variant forms are used by some modern writers as seeking more "flexibility". Roman numerals may be considered legally binding expressions of a number, as in U.S. copyright law before the Berne Convention Implementation Act of 1988 (where an "incorrect" or ambiguous numeral in a copyright notice could invalidate a copyright claim or affect the termination date of the copyright period).

=== Standard form ===
The following table displays how Roman numerals are usually written in modern times:

Individual decimal places
	Thousands	Hundreds	Tens	Units
1	M	C	X	I
2	MM	CC	XX	II
3	MMM	CCC	XXX	III
4		CD	XL	IV
5		D	L	V
6		DC	LX	VI
7		DCC	LXX	VII
8		DCCC	LXXX	VIII
9		CM	XC	IX

The numerals for 4 (IV) and 9 (IX) are written using subtractive notation, where the smaller symbol (I) is subtracted from the larger one (V or X), instead of IIII and VIIII. (Note: IV and IX not only have fewer characters than IIII and VIIII, but are less likely to be confused (especially at a quick glance) with III and VIII. Cf. Chrisomalis 2010, pp. 377–378.) Subtractive notation is also used for 40 (XL), 90 (XC), 400 (CD) and 900 (CM). These are the only subtractive forms in standard use.

A number containing two or more decimal digits is built by appending the Roman numeral equivalent for each, from highest to lowest, as in the following examples:

- 39 = XXX + IX = XXXIX.
- 246 = CC + XL + VI = CCXLVI.
- 789 = DCC + LXXX + IX = DCCLXXXIX.
- 2,421 = MM + CD + XX + I = MMCDXXI.

Any missing place (represented by a zero in the place-value equivalent) is omitted, as in Latin (and English) speech:

- 160 = C + LX = CLX
- 207 = CC + VII = CCVII
- 1,009 = M + IX = MIX
- 1,066 = M + LX + VI = MLXVI

The largest number that can be represented in this manner is 3,999 (MMMCMXCIX), but this is sufficient for the values for which Roman numerals are commonly used today, such as year numbers:

- 1776 = M + DCC + LXX + VI = MDCCLXXVI (the date written on the book held by the Statue of Liberty).
- 1918 = M + CM + X + VIII = MCMXVIII (the first year of the Spanish flu pandemic)
- 1944 = M + CM + XL + IV = MCMXLIV (erroneous copyright notice of the 1954 movie The Last Time I Saw Paris)
- 2026 = MMXXVI (this year) (Note: This is the Coordinated Universal Time (UTC) year in which Wikipedia's cache of this page was last updated, so may be a few hours out of date.)

For larger numbers (4,000 and larger): Both before and after the introduction of Arabic numerals in the West, from ancient times through medieval and modern, users of Roman numerals have used various means to write larger numbers.

=== Other forms ===
Forms exist that vary in one way or another from the general standard represented above.

==== Other additive forms ====
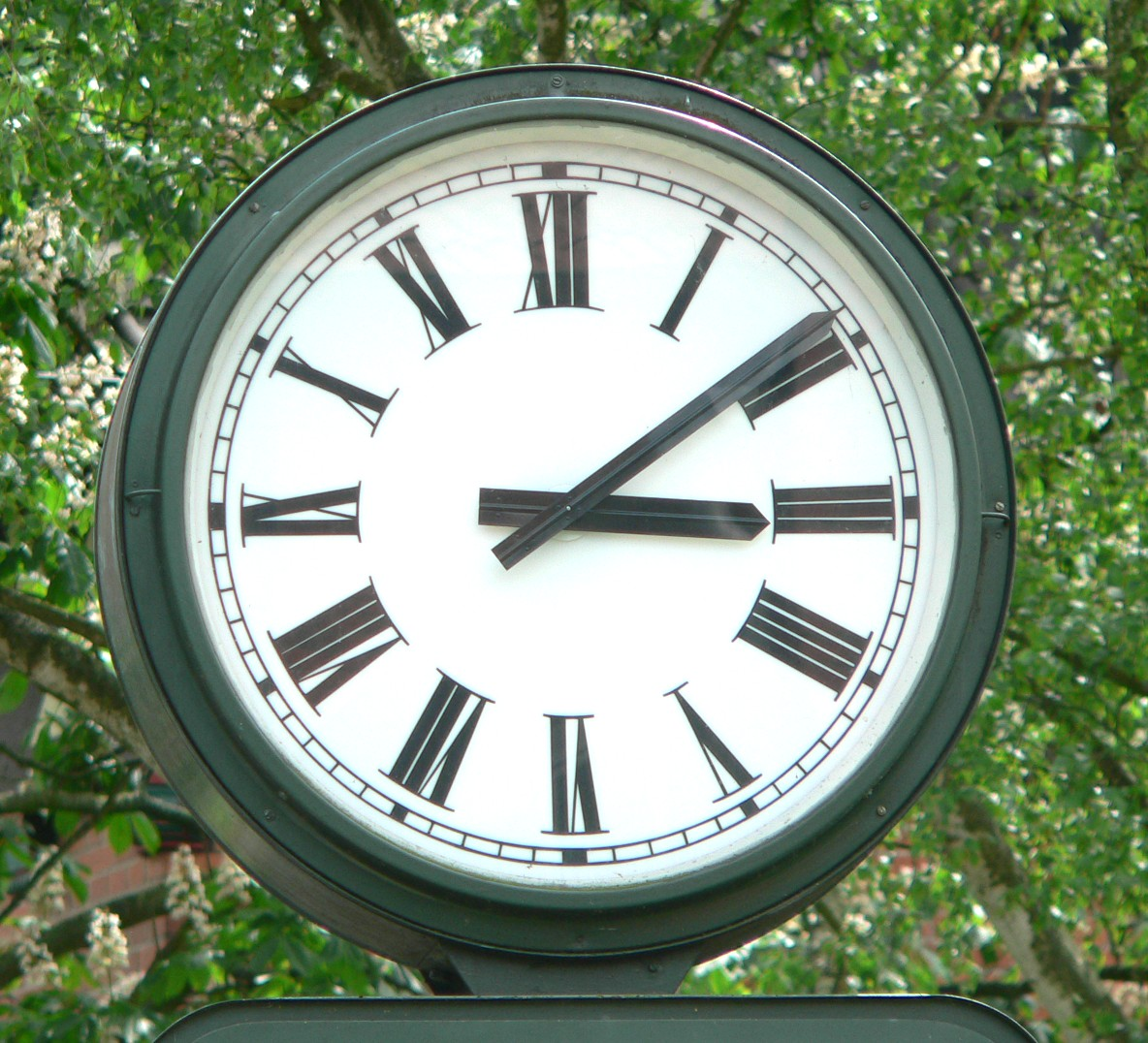
A clock face with the Roman numerals typical for clocks, in Bad Salzdetfurth, Germany

While subtractive notation for 4, 40, and 400 (IV, XL, and CD) is the modern standard, additive notation to represent these numbers (IIII, XXXX, and CCCC) was often used, including in compound numbers like 24 (XXIIII), 74 (LXXIIII), and 490 (CCCCLXXXX). The additive forms for 9, 90, and 900 (VIIII, LXXXX, and DCCCC) have also been used, although less often.

The two conventions could be mixed in the same document or inscription, even in the same numeral. For example, on the numbered gates to the Colosseum, IIII is systematically used instead of IV, but subtractive notation is used for XL; consequently, gate 44 is labelled XLIIII.

Especially on tombstones and other funerary inscriptions, 5 and 50 have been occasionally written IIIII and XXXXX instead of V and L, and there are instances such as IIIIII and XXXXXX rather than VI or LX.

Modern clock faces that use Roman numerals still very often use IIII for four o'clock but IX for nine o'clock, a practice that goes back to very early clocks such as the Wells Cathedral clock of the late 14th century. However, this is far from universal: for example, the clock of Elizabeth Tower at the Palace of Westminster uses a subtractive IV for 4 o'clock. (Note: Isaac Asimov once mentioned an "interesting theory" that Romans avoided using IV because it was the initial letters of IVPITER, the Latin spelling of Jupiter, and might have seemed impious. He did not say whose theory it was.)

The year number on Admiralty Arch, London. The year 1910 is rendered as MDCCCCX, rather than the more usual MCMX

Several monumental inscriptions created in the early 20th century use variant forms for "1900" (usually written MCM). These vary from MDCCCCX for 1910 as seen on Admiralty Arch, London, to the more unusual, if not unique MDCDIII for 1903, on the north entrance to the Saint Louis Art Museum.

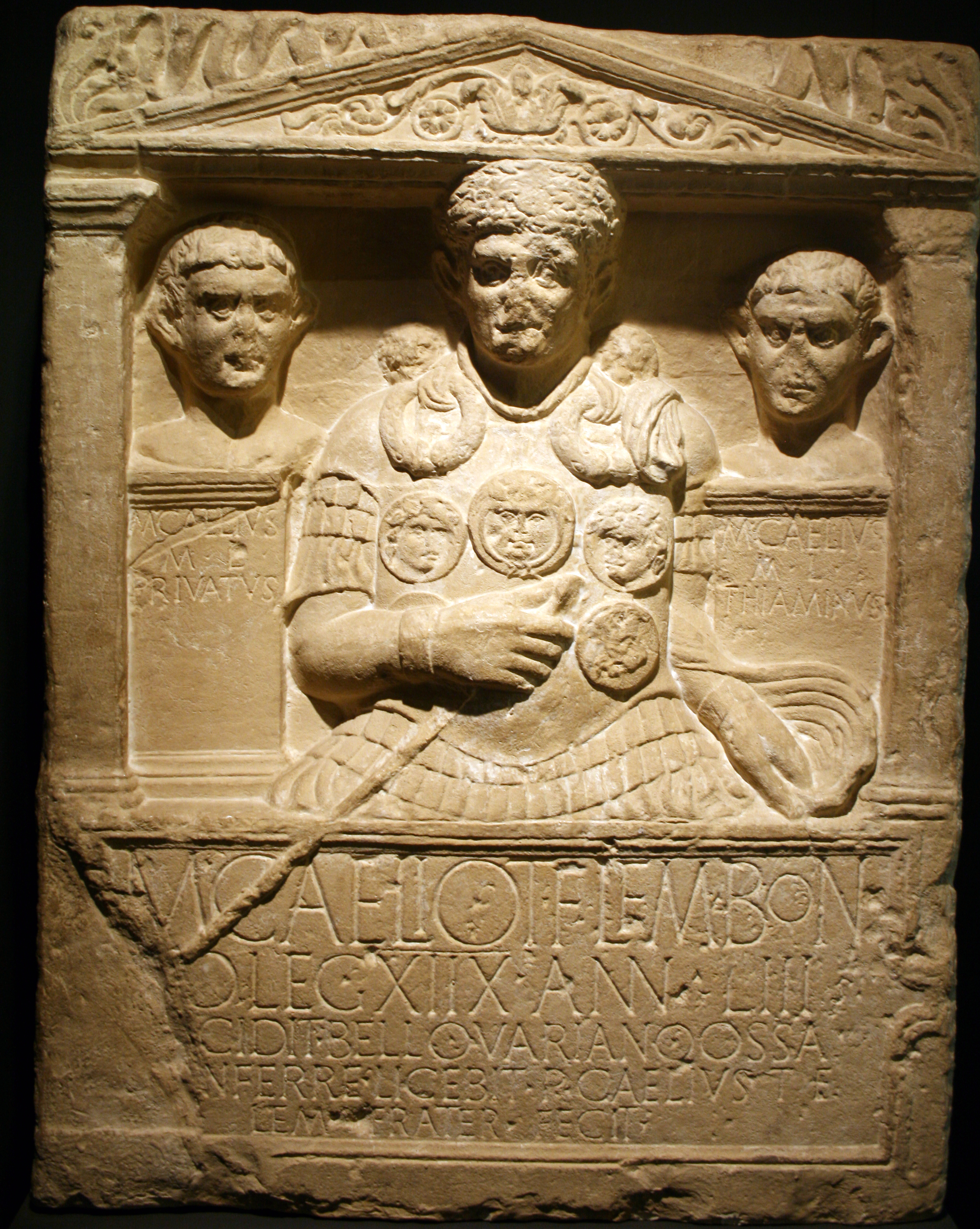
Epitaph of centurion Marcus Caelius, showing "XIIX"

==== Other subtractive forms ====
There are numerous historical examples of IIX being used for 8; for example, XIIX was used by officers of the Legio XVIII (18th Roman legion) to write their number. The notation appears prominently on the cenotaph of their senior centurion Marcus Caelius (c. 45 BC – 9 AD). On the publicly displayed official Roman calendars known as Fasti, XIIX is used for the 18 days to the next Kalends, and XXIIX for the 28 days in February. The latter can be seen on the sole extant pre-Julian calendar, the Fasti Antiates Maiores. There are historical examples of other subtractive forms: IIIXX for 17, IIXX for 18, IIIC for 97, IIC for 98, and IC for 99. A possible explanation is that the word for 18 in Latin is duodeviginti— literally "two from twenty"— while 98 is duodecentum (two from hundred) and 99 is undecentum (one from hundred). However, the explanation does not seem to apply to IIIXX and IIIC, since the Latin words for 17 and 97 were septendecim (seven ten) and nonaginta septem (ninety seven), respectively.

The ROMAN() function in Microsoft Excel supports multiple subtraction modes depending on the "Form" setting. For example, the number "499" (usually CDXCIX) can be rendered as LDVLIV ((500-50)+(50-5)+(5-1)), XDIX ((500-10)+(10-1)), VDIV ((500-5)+(5-1)) or ID (500-1). The relevant Microsoft help page offers no explanation for this function other than to describe its output as "more concise".

==== Non-standard variants ====
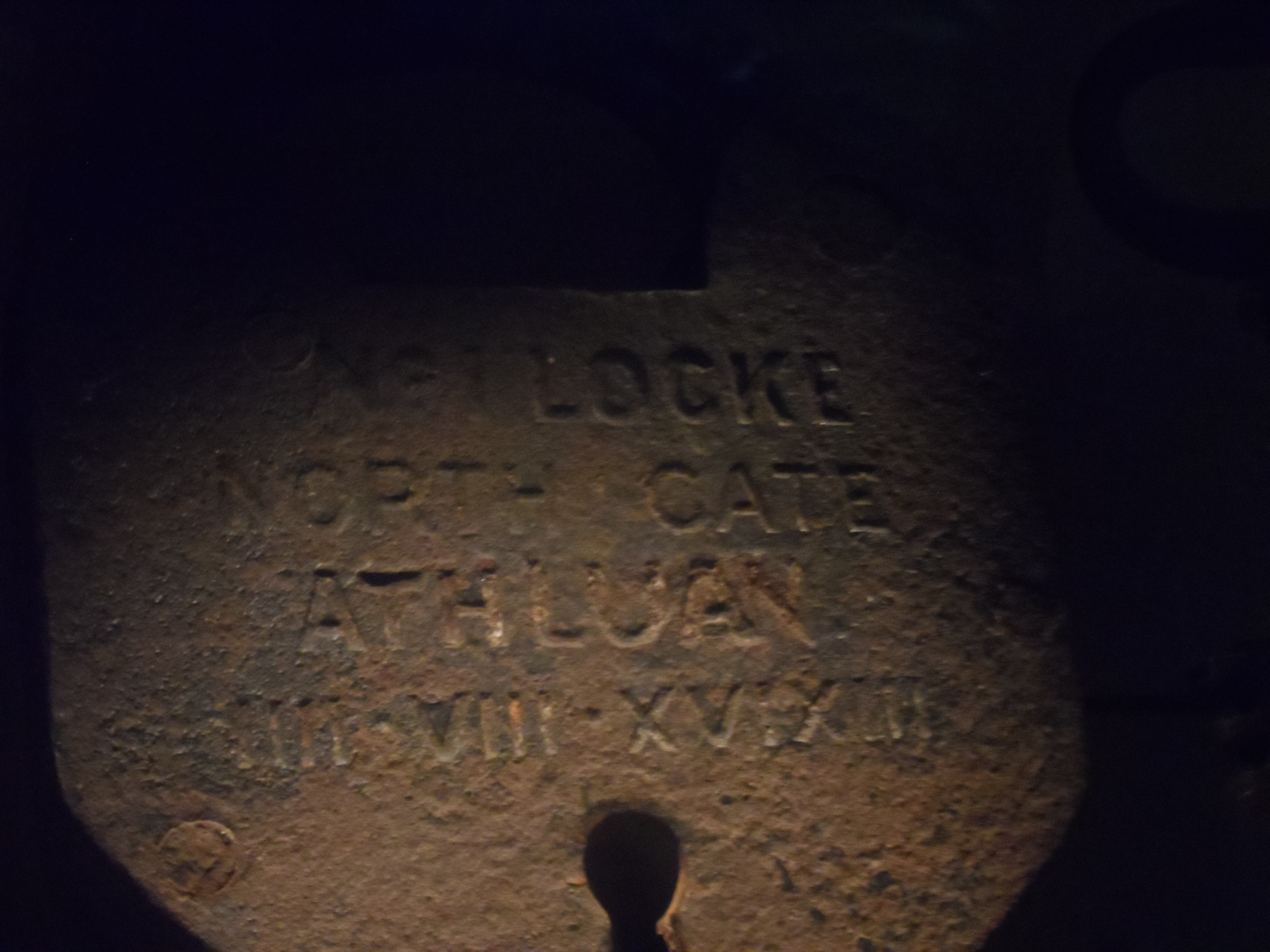
Padlock used on the north gate of the Irish town of Athlone. "1613" in the date is rendered XVIXIII, (literally "16, 13") instead of MDCXIII.

Excerpt from Bibliothèque nationale de France. The Roman numeral for 500 is rendered as, instead of D.

There are also historical examples of other additive and multiplicative forms, and forms which seem to reflect spoken phrases. Some of these variants may have been regarded as errors even by contemporaries.

- IIXX was how people associated with the XXII Roman Legion used to write their number. The practice may have been due to a common way to say "twenty-second" in Latin, namely duo et vice(n)sima (literally "two and twentieth") rather than the "regular" vice(n)sima secunda (twenty second). Apparently, at least one ancient stonecutter mistakenly thought that the IIXX of "22nd Legion" stood for 18, and "corrected" it to XVIII.
- Other numerals that do not fit the usual patterns—such as VXL for 45, instead of the usual XLV—may be due to scribal errors, or the writer's lack of familiarity with the system, rather than being genuine variant usage.

=== Zero ===
As a non-positional numeral system, Roman numerals have no "place-keeping" zeros. Furthermore, the system as used by the Romans lacked a numeral for the number zero itself (that is, what remains after 1 is subtracted from 1). The word nulla (the Latin word meaning "none") was used to represent 0, although the earliest attested instances are medieval. For instance Dionysius Exiguus used nulla alongside Roman numerals in a manuscript from 525 AD. About 725, Bede or one of his colleagues used the letter N, the initial of nulla or of nihil (the Latin word for "nothing") for 0, in a table of epacts, all written in Roman numerals.

The use of N to indicate "none" long survived in the historic apothecaries' system of measurement: used well into the 20th century to designate quantities in pharmaceutical prescriptions.

In later times, the Arabic numeral "0" has been used as a zero to open enumerations with Roman numbers. Examples include the 24-hour Shepherd Gate Clock from 1852 and tarot packs such as the 15th-century Sola Busca and the 20th century Rider–Waite packs.

=== Fractions ===
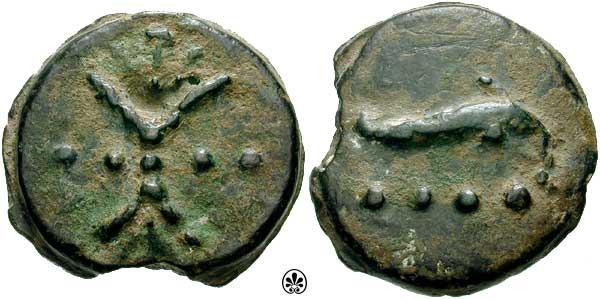
A triens coin (1/3 or 4/12 of an as). Note the four dots (····) indicating its value.

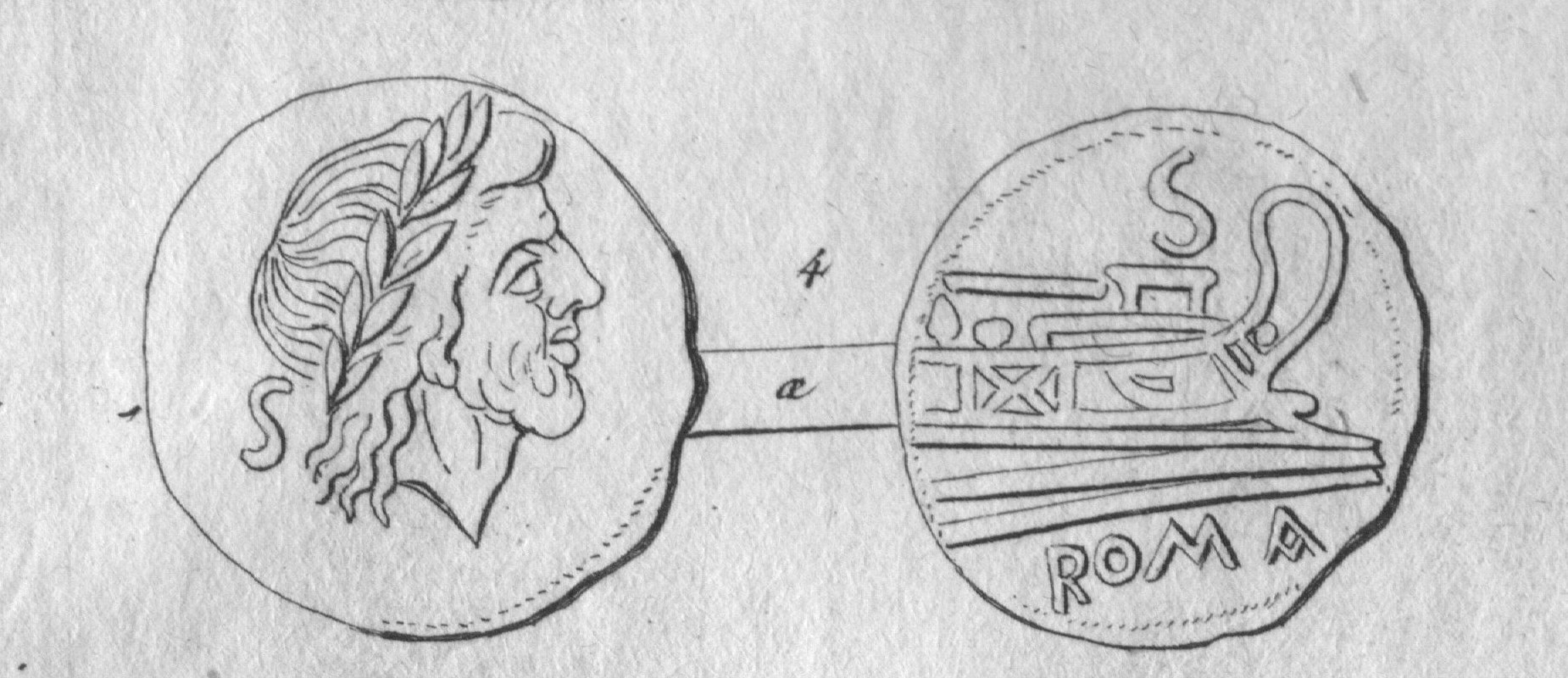
A semis coin (1/2 or 6/12 of an as). Note the S indicating its value.

The base "Roman fraction" is S, indicating 1/2. The use of S (as in VIIS to indicate 7 1/2) is attested in some ancient inscriptions and in the now rare apothecaries' system (usually in the form SS): but while Roman numerals for whole numbers are essentially decimal, S does not correspond to 5/10, as one might expect, but 6/12.

The Romans used a duodecimal rather than a decimal system for fractions, as the divisibility of twelve (12 = 2^{2} × 3) makes it easier to handle the common fractions of 1/3 and 1/4 than does a system based on ten (10 = 2 × 5). Notation for fractions other than 1/2 is mainly found on surviving Roman coins, many of which had values that were duodecimal fractions of the unit as. Fractions less than 1/2 are indicated by a dot (·) for each uncia "twelfth", the source of the English words inch and ounce; dots are repeated for fractions up to five twelfths. Six twelfths (one half), is S for semis "half". Uncia dots were added to S for fractions from seven to eleven twelfths, just as tallies were added to V for whole numbers from six to nine. The arrangement of the dots was variable and not necessarily linear. Five dots arranged like (⁙) (as on the face of a die) are known as a quincunx, from the name of the Roman fraction/coin. The Latin words sextans and quadrans are the source of the English words sextant and quadrant.

Each fraction from 1/12 to 12/12 had a name in Roman times; these corresponded to the names of the related coins:

Fraction	Roman numeral	Name (nominative and genitive singular)	Meaning
1/12	·	Uncia, unciae	"Ounce"
2/12 = 1/6	·· or :	Sextans, sextantis	"Sixth"
3/12 = 1/4	··· or ∴	Quadrans, quadrantis	"Quarter"
4/12 = 1/3	···· or ∷	Triens, trientis	"Third"
5/12	····· or ⁙	Quincunx, quincuncis	"Five-ounce" (quinque unciae → quincunx)
6/12 = 1/2	S	Semis, semissis	"Half"
7/12	S·	Septunx, septuncis	"Seven-ounce" (septem unciae → septunx)
8/12 = 2/3	S·· or S:	Bes, bessis	"Twice" (as in "twice a third")
9/12 = 3/4	S··· or S∴	Dodrans, dodrantis or nonuncium, nonuncii	"Less a quarter" (de-quadrans → dodrans) or "ninth ounce" (nona uncia → nonuncium)
10/12 = 5/6	S···· or S∷	Dextans, dextantis or decunx, decuncis	"Less a sixth" (de-sextans → dextans) or "ten ounces" (decem unciae → decunx)
11/12	S····· or S⁙	Deunx, deuncis	"Less an ounce" (de-uncia → deunx)
12/12 = 1	I	As, assis	"Unit"

Other Roman fractional notations included the following:

Fraction	Roman numeral	Name (nominative and genitive singular)	Meaning
1/1728=12^{−3}	𐆕	Siliqua, siliquae	
1/288	℈	Scripulum, scripuli	"scruple (unit)"
1/144=12^{−2}	𐆔	Dimidia sextula, dimidiae sextulae	"half a sextula"
1/72	𐆓	Sextula, sextulae	"1/6 of an uncia"
1/48	Ↄ	Sicilicus, sicilici	
1/36	𐆓𐆓	Binae sextulae, binarum sextularum (Exceptionally, these are plural forms.)	"two sextulas" (duella, duellae)
1/24	Σ or 𐆒 or Є	Semuncia, semunciae	"1/2 uncia" (semi- + uncia)
1/8	Σ· or 𐆒· or Є·	Sescuncia, sescunciae	"1 1/2 uncias" (sesqui- + uncia)

Fractions could also be indicated with a slash through the last letter in a numeral (e.g. Ɨ), which subtracted the number by an amount less than one (usually 1/2).

=== Large numbers ===
The modern form can only write numbers up to 3999, and without M in early Roman times only numbers up to 899 could be written. Various schemes have been used over time to write larger numbers.

==== Apostrophus ====
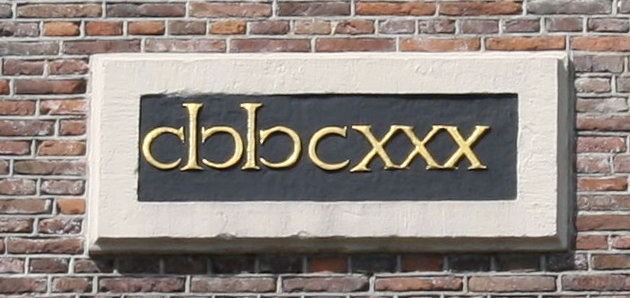
"1630" on the Westerkerk in Amsterdam. "M" and "D" are given archaic apostrophus form.

Using the apostrophus method, 500 is written as IↃ, while 1,000 is written as CIↃ. This system of encasing numbers to denote thousands (imagine the Cs and Ↄs as parentheses) had its origins in Etruscan numeral usage.

Each additional set of C and Ↄ surrounding CIↃ raises the value by a factor of ten: CCIↃↃ represents 10,000 and CCCIↃↃↃ represents 100,000. Similarly, each additional Ↄ to the right of IↃ raises the value by a factor of ten: IↃↃ represents 5,000 and IↃↃↃ represents 50,000. Numerals larger than CCCIↃↃↃ do not occur.

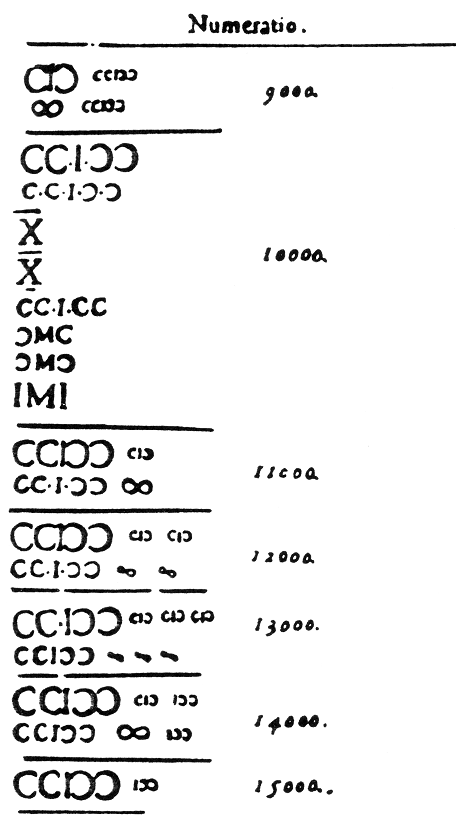
Page from a 16th-century manual, showing a mixture of apostrophus and vinculum numbers (see in particular the ways of writing 10,000).

- IↃ = 500
- CIↃ = 1,000
- IↃↃ = 5,000
- CCIↃↃ = 10,000
- IↃↃↃ = 50,000
- CCCIↃↃↃ = 100,000

Sometimes IↃ (500) is reduced to D, CIↃ (1,000) to ↀ, IↃↃ (5,000) to ↁ; CCIↃↃ (10,000) to ↂ; IↃↃↃ (50,000) to ↇ; and CCCIↃↃↃ (100,000) to ↈ. It is likely CIↃ (1000) influenced the later M.

John Wallis is often credited with introducing the ⟨∞⟩ symbol for infinity, and one conjecture is his basing it on ↀ, since 1,000 was hyperbolically used to represent very large numbers.

==== Vinculum ====
Using the vinculum, conventional Roman numerals are multiplied by 1,000 by adding a "bar" or "overline", thus:

- IV = 4,000
- XXV = 25,000

The vinculum came into use in the late Republic, and it was a common alternative to the apostrophic ↀ during the Imperial era around the Roman world (M for '1000' was not in use until the Medieval period). It continued in use in the Middle Ages, though it became known more commonly as titulus, and it appears in modern editions of classical and medieval Latin texts.

In an extension of the vinculum, a three-sided box (now sometimes printed as two vertical lines and a vinculum) is used to multiply by 100,000, thus:

- XIII XXXII p. = 1,332,000 paces (1,332 Roman miles). (Note: XIII = 13 × 100,000 = 1,300,000 and XXXII = 32 × 1000 = 32,000, so 'XIII XXXII = 1,332,000. p. is a common abbreviation for passus, paces, the Romans counting a pace as two steps.)

Vinculum notation is distinct from the custom of adding an overline to a numeral simply to indicate that it is a number. Both usages can be seen on Roman inscriptions of the same period and general location, such as on the Antonine Wall.

==== Other ====
- There are some examples of year numbers after 1000 written as two Roman numerals 1–99, e.g. 1613 as XVIXIII, corresponding to the common reading "sixteen thirteen" of such year numbers in English, or 1519 as XXIX as in French quinze-cent-dix-neuf (fifteen-hundred and nineteen), and similar readings in other languages.
- In some French texts from the 15th century and later, one finds constructions like IIII^{XX}XIX for 99, reflecting the French reading of that number as quatre-vingt-dix-neuf (four-score and nineteen). Similarly, in some English documents one finds, for example, 77 written as "iii^{xx}xvii" (which could be read "three-score and seventeen").
- A medieval accounting text from 1301 renders numbers like 13,573 as "XIII. M. V. C. III. XX. XIII", that is, "13×1000 + 5×100 + 3×20 + 13".

== Origin ==
The system is closely associated with the ancient city-state of Rome and the Empire that it created. However, due to the scarcity of surviving examples, the origins of the system are obscure and there are several competing theories, all largely conjectural.

=== Etruscan numerals ===
Rome was founded sometime between 850 and 750 BC, next to the southern edge of the Etruscan domain, which covered a large part of north-central Italy.

The Roman numerals, in particular, are directly derived from the Etruscan number symbols: ⟨𐌠⟩, ⟨𐌡⟩, ⟨𐌢⟩, ⟨𐌣⟩, and ⟨𐌟⟩ for 1, 5, 10, 50, and 100 (they had more symbols for larger numbers, but it is unknown which symbol represents which number). As in the basic Roman system, the Etruscans wrote the symbols that added to the desired number, from higher to lower value. Thus, the number 87, for example, would be written 50 + 10 + 10 + 10 + 5 + 1 + 1 = 𐌣𐌢𐌢𐌢𐌡𐌠𐌠 (this would appear as 𐌠𐌠𐌡𐌢𐌢𐌢𐌣 since Etruscan was written from right to left.)

The symbols ⟨𐌠⟩ and ⟨𐌡⟩ resembled letters of the Etruscan alphabet, but ⟨𐌢⟩, ⟨𐌣⟩, and ⟨𐌟⟩ did not. The Etruscans used the subtractive notation, too, but not like the Romans. They wrote 17, 18, and 19 as 𐌠𐌠𐌠𐌢𐌢, 𐌠𐌠𐌢𐌢, and 𐌠𐌢𐌢, mirroring the way they spoke those numbers ("three from twenty", etc.); and similarly for 27, 28, 29, 37, 38, etc. However, they did not write 𐌠𐌡 for 4 (nor 𐌢𐌣 for 40), and wrote 𐌡𐌠𐌠, 𐌡𐌠𐌠𐌠 and 𐌡𐌠𐌠𐌠𐌠 for 7, 8, and 9, respectively.

=== Early Roman numerals ===
Milestone of the 2nd century BC, with 260 written as CCↆX, using the 'anchor' mark for fifty.

The early Roman numerals for 1, 10, and 100 were the Etruscan ones: ⟨𐌠⟩, ⟨𐌢⟩, and ⟨𐌟⟩. The symbols for 5 and 50 changed from ⟨𐌡⟩ and ⟨𐌣⟩ to ⟨V⟩ and ⟨ↆ⟩ at some point. The latter had flattened to ⟨⊥⟩ (an inverted T) by the time of Augustus, and soon afterwards became identified with the graphically similar letter ⟨L⟩.

The symbol for 100 was written variously as ⟨𐌟⟩ or ⟨ↃIC⟩, and was then abbreviated to ⟨Ↄ⟩ or ⟨C⟩, with ⟨C⟩ (which matched the Latin letter C) finally winning out. Additionally, C is the first letter of CENTUM, Latin for "hundred"; which might have had an influence.

The numbers 500 and 1000 were denoted by V and X overlaid with a box or circle. Thus, 500 was like a Ɔ superimposed on a ⋌ or ⊢, making it look like ~~Þ~~. It became ~~D~~ or Ð by the time of Augustus, under the graphic influence of the letter D. It was later identified as the letter D; an alternative symbol for "thousand" was a CIↃ, and half of a thousand or "five hundred" is the right half of the symbol, IↃ, and this may have been converted into D.

The notation for 1000 was a circled or boxed X: Ⓧ, ⊗, ⊕, and by Augustan times was partially identified with the Greek letter Φ phi. Over time, the symbol changed to Ψ and ↀ. The latter symbol further evolved into ∞, then ⋈, and eventually changed to M under the influence of the Latin word mille "thousand".

According to Paul Kayser, the basic numerical symbols were I, X, 𐌟 and Φ (or ⊕) and the intermediate ones were derived by taking half of those (half an X is V, half a 𐌟 is ↆ and half a Φ/⊕ is D). Then 𐌟 and ↆ developed as mentioned above.

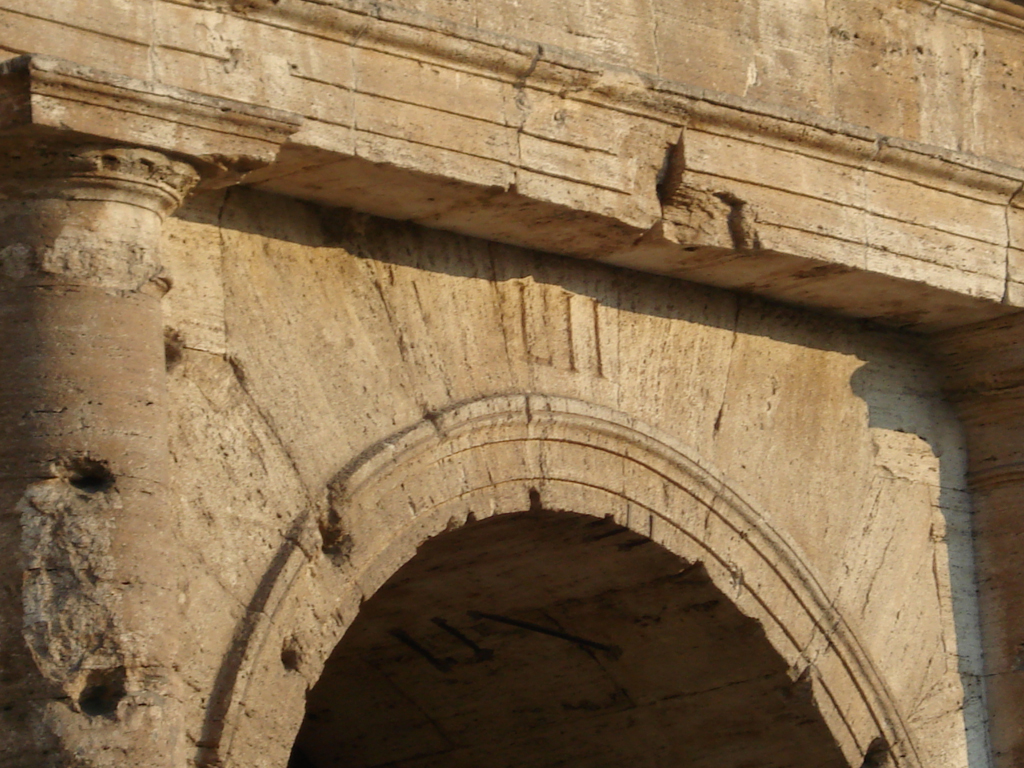
Entrance to section LII (52) of the Colosseum, with numerals still visible

=== Classical Roman numerals ===
The Colosseum was constructed in Rome in CE 72–80, and while the original perimeter wall has largely disappeared, the numbered entrances from XXIII (23) to LIIII (54) survive, to demonstrate that in Imperial times Roman numerals had already assumed their classical form: as largely standardised in current use. The most obvious anomaly (a common one that persisted for centuries) is the inconsistent use of subtractive notation - while XL is used for 40, IV is avoided in favour of IIII: in fact, gate 44 is labelled XLIIII.

== Use in the Middle Ages and Renaissance ==
Lower case, or minuscule, letters were developed in the Middle Ages, well after the demise of the Western Roman Empire, and since that time lower-case versions of Roman numbers have also been commonly used: i, ii, iii, iv, and so on.

13th century example of iiij.

Since the Middle Ages, a "j" has sometimes been substituted for the final "i" of a "lower-case" Roman numeral, such as "iij" for 3 or "vij" for 7. This "j" can be considered a swash variant of "i". Into the early 20th century, the use of a final "j" was still sometimes used in medical prescriptions to prevent tampering with or misinterpretation of a number after it was written.

Chronograms, messages with dates encoded into them, were popular during the Renaissance era. The chronogram would be a phrase containing the letters I, V, X, L, C, D, and M. By putting these letters together, the reader would obtain a number, usually indicating a particular year.

A superscript "o" (sometimes written directly above the symbol) was sometimes used as an ordinal indicator.

=== "Medieval Roman numerals" ===
Numerals in documents and inscriptions from the Middle Ages sometimes include additional symbols, which today are called "medieval Roman numerals". Some simply substitute another letter for the standard one (such as "A" for "V", or "Q" for "D"), while others serve as abbreviations for compound numerals ("O" for "XI", or "F" for "XL"). This system was occasionally extended to include letters and numbers from other scripts, with Adriano Cappelli's comprehensive record of scribal numeral forms (published 1912) recording the use of forms of omega and sampi for 800 and 900 respectively, as they represented in the Gothic numeral system, as well as combinations of Latin letters, early Roman symbols and Hindu-Arabic numerals. Although the medieval Roman numeral values for the letters of the Latin alphabet are still listed today in some dictionaries under the entries for those letters, their usage even at the time was inconsistent and never standard, and—with the aforementioned exception of M being accepted as a standard modern Roman numeral—they are not used in any meaningful capacity in modern times.

Number	Abbrev.	Notes and etymology
5	A, U	A resembles an upside-down V. Also said to equal 500.
6	ↅ	Either from a ligature of VI, or from digamma (ϛ), the Greek numeral 6 (sometimes conflated with the στ ligature). Cappelli records various handwriting forms of the symbol ranging from a form resembling a large lowercase u, the later Cyrillic И, an open-topped Latin alpha, and a capital G.
7	S, Z	Presumed abbreviation of septem, Latin for 7.
11	O	Presumed abbreviation of onze, French for 11.
40	F	Presumed abbreviation of English forty.
70	S	Also could stand for 7, with the same derivation.
80	R	
90	N	Presumed abbreviation of nonaginta, Latin for 90. (Ambiguous with N for "nothing" (nihil)).
150	Y	Possibly derived from the lowercase y's shape.
151	K	Unusual, origin unknown; also said to stand for 250.
160	T	Possibly derived from Greek tetra, as 4 × 40 = 160.
200	H	Could also stand for 2 (see also 𐆙, the symbol for the dupondius). From a barring of two I's.
250	E	
300	B	
400	P, G	
500	Q	Redundant with D; abbreviates quingenti, Latin for 500. Also sometimes used—in particular, a form with a much longer descender extending rightward—for 500,000.
800	W	Recorded in Cappelli as a rounded form resembling lowercase omega, paralleling the Gothic use of omega for the same value.
2000	Z	
5000	ȹ	A ligature of lowercase Q with the apostrophus ⟨Ↄ⟩.
9000	Ṫ, ₸	Cappelli notes that the T with double dot is only attested for Spanish-suited playing cards and may have been derived from the Gothic form of sampi, which used a T-like symbol resembling an up arrow to represent 900.

== Modern use ==
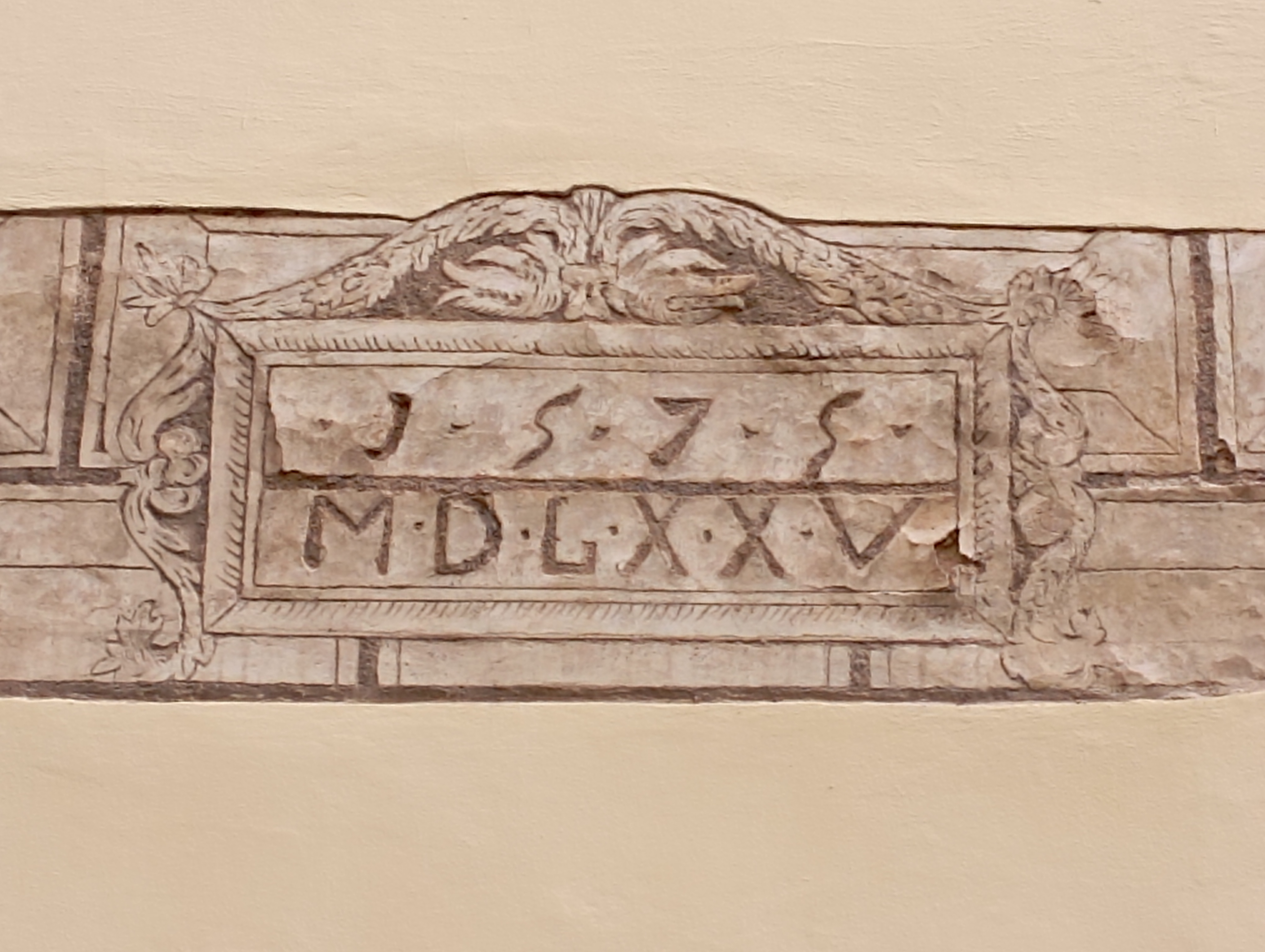
Year 1575 in Arabic and Roman numbers

By the 11th century, Arabic numerals had been introduced into Europe from al-Andalus, by way of Arab traders and arithmetic treatises. Roman numerals, however, proved very persistent, remaining in common use in the West well into the 14th and 15th centuries, even in accounting and other business records (where the actual calculations would have been made using an abacus). Replacement by their more convenient "Arabic" equivalents was quite gradual, and Roman numerals are still used today in certain contexts. A few examples of their current use are:

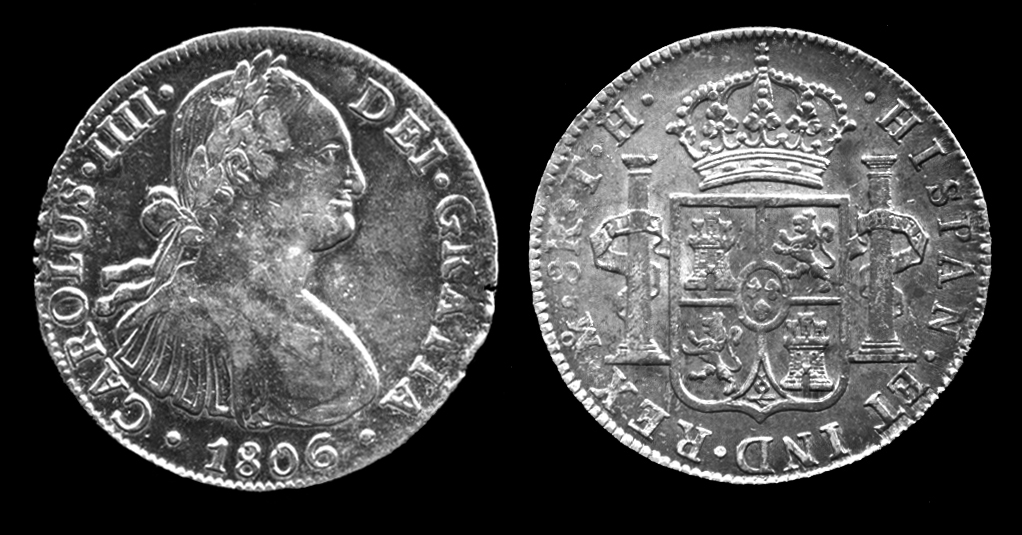
Spanish Real using IIII instead of IV as regnal number of Charles IV of Spain.

- Names of monarchs and popes, e.g. Elizabeth II of the United Kingdom, Pope Leo XIV. These are referred to as regnal numbers and are usually read as ordinals; e.g. II is pronounced "the second". This tradition began in Europe sporadically in the Middle Ages, gaining widespread use in England during the reign of Henry VIII. Previously, the monarch was not known by numeral but by an epithet such as Edward the Confessor. Some monarchs (e.g. Charles IV of Spain, Louis XIV of France and William IV of Great Britain) seem to have preferred the use of IIII instead of IV on their coinage (see illustration).
- Generational suffixes, particularly in the U.S., for people sharing the same name across generations, such as William Howard Taft IV. These are also usually read as ordinals.
- In the French Republican Calendar, initiated during the French Revolution, years were numbered by Roman numerals – from the year I (1792) when this calendar was introduced to the year XIV (1805) when it was abandoned.
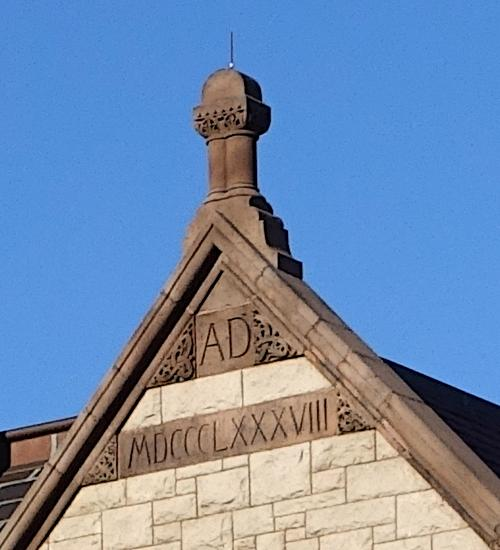
- The year of construction of the Cambridge Public Library (Massachusetts, U.S.), 1888, displayed in "standard" Roman numerals on its facade.
  The year of production of films, television shows and other works of art within the work itself. Outside reference to the work will use regular Arabic numerals.
- Hour marks on timepieces. In this context, 4 is often written IIII.
- The year of construction on building façades and cornerstones.
- Page numbering of prefaces and introductions of books, and sometimes of appendices and annexes, too.
- Book volume and chapter numbers, as well as the several acts within a play (e.g. Act iii, Scene 2).
- Sequels to some films, video games, and other works (as in Rocky II, Grand Theft Auto V, Myst III: Exile).
- Outlines that use numbers to show hierarchical relationships.
- Occurrences of a recurring grand event, for instance:
  - The Summer and Winter Olympic Games (e.g. the XXI Olympic Winter Games; the Games of the XXX Olympiad).
  - The Super Bowl, the annual championship game of the National Football League (e.g. Super Bowl XLII; Super Bowl 50 was a one-time exception).
  - WrestleMania, the annual professional wrestling event for WWE (e.g. WrestleMania XXX). This usage has also been inconsistent.
- World War I and World War II.

=== Specific disciplines ===
In astronautics, United States rocket model variants are sometimes designated by Roman numerals, e.g. Titan I, Titan II, Titan III, Saturn I, Saturn V.

In astronomy, the natural satellites or "moons" of the planets are designated by capital Roman numerals appended to the planet's name. For example, Titan's designation is Saturn VI.

In chemistry, Roman numerals are sometimes used to denote the groups of the periodic table, but this has officially been deprecated in favour of Arabic numerals. They are also used in the IUPAC nomenclature of inorganic chemistry, for the oxidation number of cations which can take on several different positive charges. They are also used for naming phases of polymorphic crystals, such as ice.

In education, school grades (in the sense of year-groups rather than test scores) are sometimes referred to by a Roman numeral; for example, "grade IX" is sometimes seen for "grade 9".

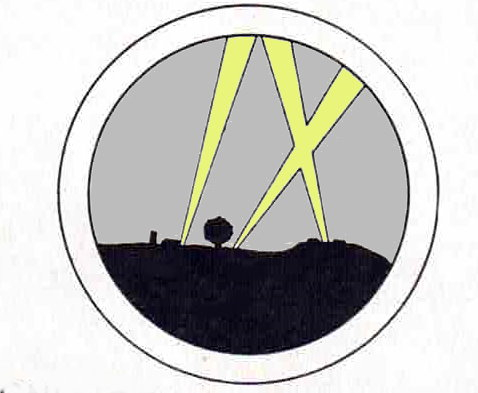
Stylised "IX" represents "9" in unit emblem of 9th Aero Squadron AEF, 1918.

In entomology, the broods of the thirteen- and seventeen-year periodical cicadas are identified by Roman numerals.

In graphic design, stylised Roman numerals may represent numeric values.

In law, Roman numerals are commonly used to help organize legal codes as part of an alphanumeric outline. In citing UK Acts of Parliament within a given year (a given session until 1963), the chapter of a local act is given in lowercase Roman numerals, whereas that of a public act has plain Arabic numerals and a personal act has italic Arabic numerals.

In mathematics (including trigonometry, statistics, and calculus), when a graph includes negative numbers, its quadrants are named using I, II, III, and IV. These quadrant names signify positive numbers on both axes, negative numbers on the x-axis, negative numbers on both axes, and negative numbers on the y-axis, respectively. The use of Roman numerals to designate quadrants avoids confusion, since Arabic numerals are used for the actual data represented in the graph.

In military unit designation, Roman numerals are often used to distinguish between units at different levels. This reduces possible confusion, especially when viewing operational or strategic level maps. In particular, army corps are often numbered using Roman numerals (for example, the American XVIII Airborne Corps or the Nazi III Panzerkorps) with Arabic numerals being used for divisions and armies.

In music, Roman numerals are used in several contexts:

- Movements are often numbered using Roman numerals.
- In Roman numeral analysis, harmonic function is identified using Roman numerals.
- Individual strings of stringed instruments, such as the violin, are often denoted by Roman numerals, with higher numbers denoting lower strings.

In pharmacy, Roman numerals were used with the now largely obsolete apothecaries' system of measurement: including SS to denote "one half" and N to denote "zero".

In photography, Roman numerals (with zero) are used to denote varying levels of brightness when using the Zone System.

In seismology, Roman numerals are used to designate degrees of the Mercalli intensity scale of earthquakes.

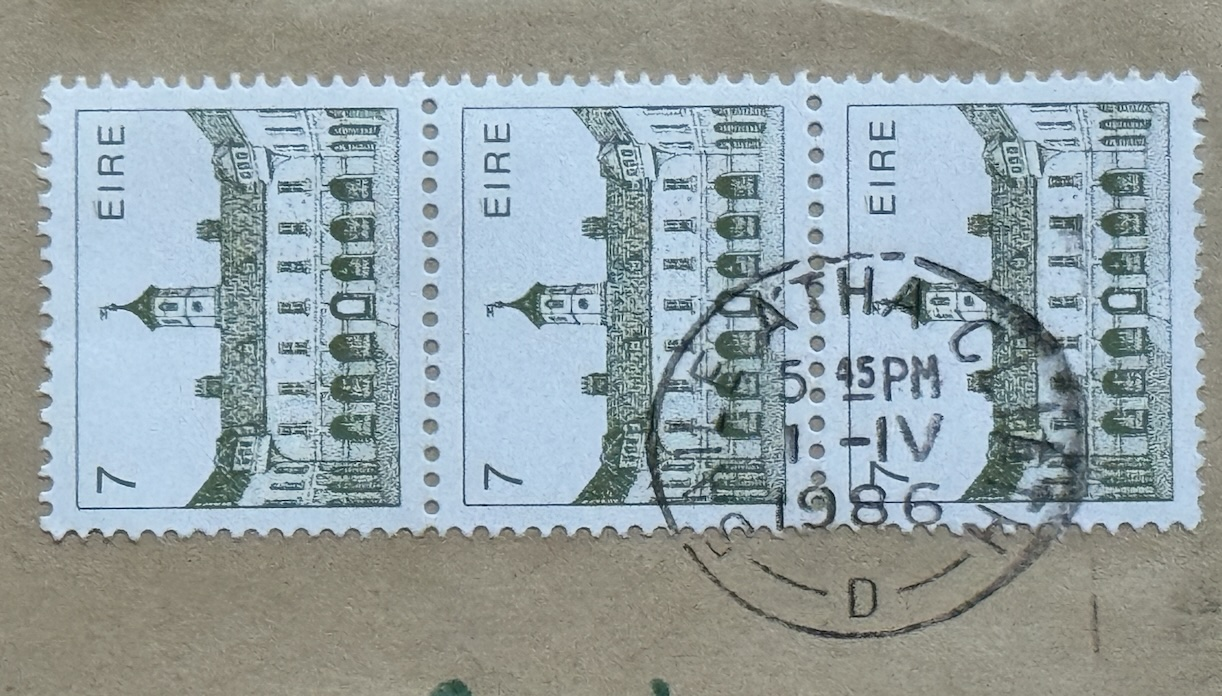
Example of postage stamp from Ireland (Éire) franked using Roman numeral for the month

In sport the team containing the "top" players and representing a nation or province, a club or a school at the highest level in (say) rugby union is often called the "1st XV", while a lower-ranking cricket or American football team might be the "3rd XI".

In tarot, Roman numerals (with zero) are often used to denote the cards of the Major Arcana.

In Ireland, Roman numerals were used until the late 1980s to indicate the month on postage franking. In documents, Roman numerals are sometimes still used to indicate the month to avoid confusion over day/month/year or month/day/year formats.

In theology and biblical scholarship, the Septuagint is often referred to as LXX, as this translation of the Old Testament into Greek is named for the legendary number of its translators (septuaginta being Latin for "seventy").

=== Modern use in European languages other than English ===
Some uses that are rare or never seen in English-speaking countries may be relatively common in parts of continental Europe and in other regions (e.g. Latin America) that use a European language other than English. For instance:

Capital or small capital Roman numerals are widely used in Romance languages to denote centuries, e.g. the French xviii^{e} siècle and the Spanish siglo xviii for "18th century". Some Slavic and Turkic languages (especially in and adjacent to Russia) similarly favour Roman numerals (e.g. Russian XVIII век, Azeri XVIII əsr or Polish wiek XVIII). On the other hand, in Turkish and some Central European Slavic languages, like most Germanic languages, one writes "18." (with a period) before the local word for "century" (e.g. Turkish 18. yüzyıl, Czech 18. století).

When typing on Russian typewriters, the Roman-numeral "V" was replaced with "У" because the letter "V" is absent in the Russian Cyrillic alphabet. Additionally, the Roman-numeral "I" was replaced with "1", since this letter had been removed from the Russian alphabet by the 1918 reform of orthography; in typewritten texts, 1 could look as 1 or I depending on the typewriter model. The numbers "II" and "III" were replaced with "П" and "Ш" respectively. For "X", the Cyrillic letter "Х" was used. For example, XVIII was typed as ХУШ. This style is sometimes maintained even when typing on a computer, either out of habit or due to the inconvenience of switching between Latin and Russian script for one or two letters. The numerals "L", "C", "D", and "M" were rarely used in Russian typewritten texts, although some Russian books on typewriting accepted replacing them by the Cyrillic letters "Л", "С", "Д", and "М". Roman numerals are quite a common way for writing ordinal numbers in Russian texts. The usage of Roman numerals to indicate occurrences of a recurring grand event in Russian is more common than in English; for example, they were used for Congresses of the Communist Party of the Soviet Union. Besides the cases mentioned above, Roman numerals are used in Russian for declensions and conjugations, blood types (the notations O, A, B, AB and I, II, III, IV are both well known in Russia), half-years and quarters of a year, etc.

Roman numerals in Russian typewriting
Number	I	II	III	IV	V	VI	VII	VIII	IX	X	L	C	D	M
Typewritten	1	П	Ш	1У	У	У1	УП	УШ	1Х	Х	Л	С	Д	М

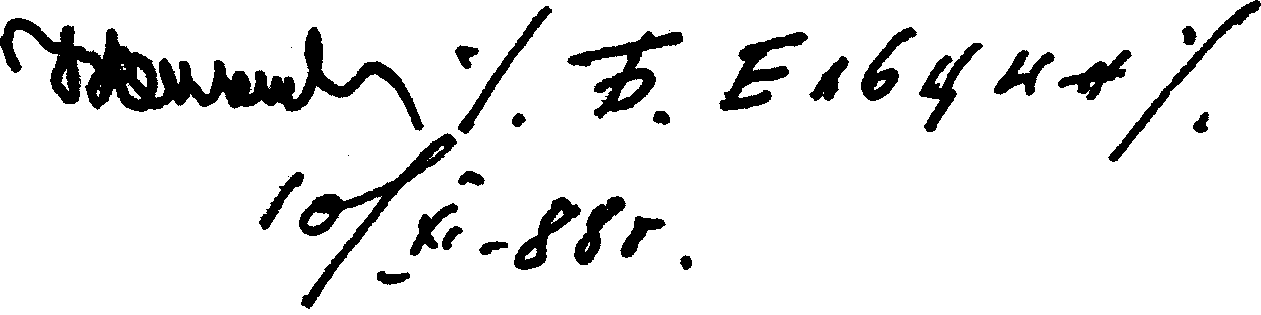
Boris Yeltsin's signature, dated 10 November 1988, rendered as 10.XI.'88.

Mixed Roman and Arabic numerals are sometimes used in numeric representations of dates (especially in formal letters and official documents, but also on tombstones). The month is written in Roman numerals, while the day is in Arabic numerals: "4.VI.1789" and "VI.4.1789" both refer unambiguously to 4 June 1789.

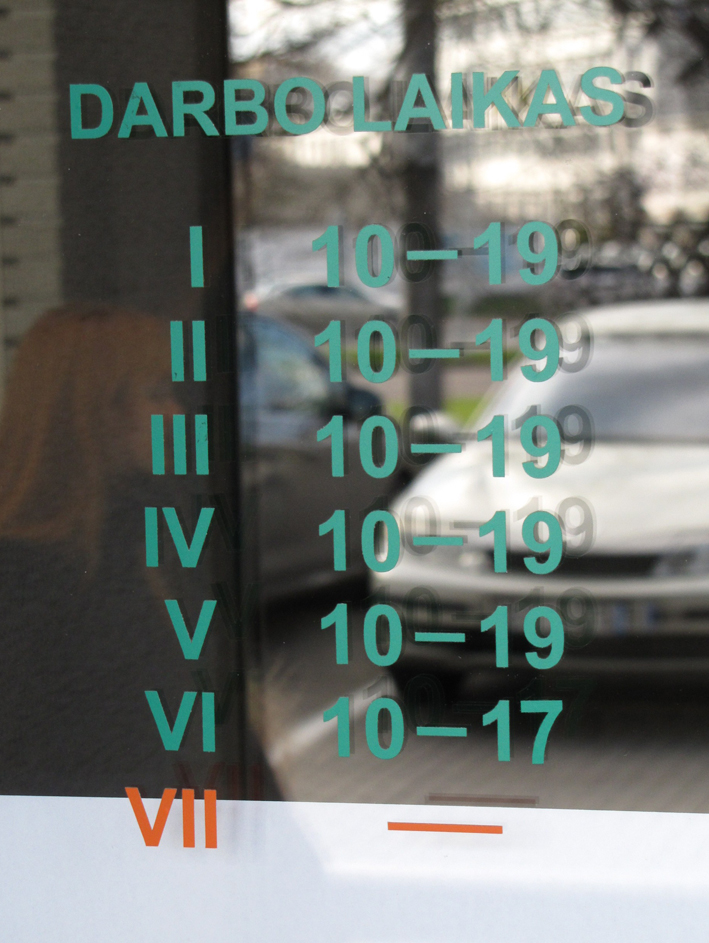
Business hours table on a shop window in Vilnius, Lithuania.

Roman numerals are sometimes used to represent the days of the week in hours-of-operation signs displayed in windows or on doors of businesses, and sometimes in railway and bus timetables. Monday, taken as the first day of the week, is represented by I. Sunday is represented by VII. The hours of operation signs are tables composed of two columns where the left column is the day of the week in Roman numerals and the right column is a range of hours of operation from starting time to closing time. In the example case (left), the business opens from 10 a.m. to 7 p.m. on weekdays, 10 a.m. to 5 p.m. on Saturdays and is closed on Sundays. Note that the listing uses 24-hour time.

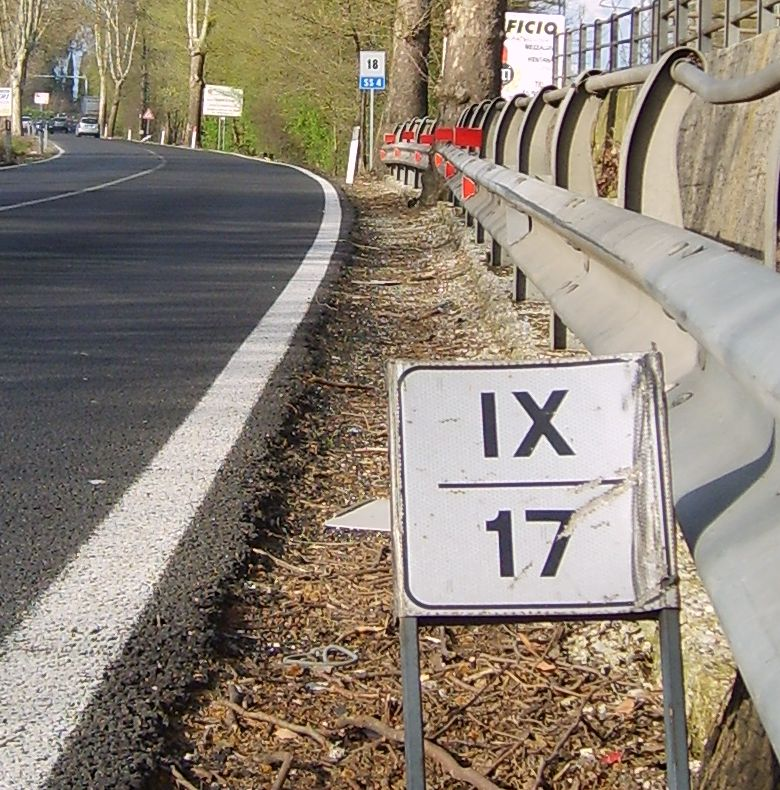
Sign at 17.9 km on route SS4 Salaria, north of Rome, Italy.

Roman numerals may also be used for floor numbering. For instance, apartments in central Amsterdam are indicated as 138-III, with both an Arabic numeral (number of the block or house) and a Roman numeral (floor number). The apartment on the ground floor is indicated as 138-huis.

In Italy, where roads outside built-up areas have kilometre signs, major roads and motorways also mark 100-metre subdivisionals, using Roman numerals from I to IX for the smaller intervals. The sign IX/17 thus marks 17.9 km.

Certain Romance-speaking countries use Roman numerals to designate assemblies of their national legislatures. For instance, the composition of the Italian Parliament from 2018 to 2022 (elected in the 2018 Italian general election) is called the XVIII Legislature of the Italian Republic (or more commonly the "XVIII Legislature").

A notable exception to the use of Roman numerals in Europe is in Greece, where Greek numerals (based on the Greek alphabet) are generally used in contexts where Roman numerals would be used elsewhere.

== Unicode ==
The "Number Forms" block of the Unicode computer character set standard has a number of Roman numeral symbols in the range of code points from U+2160 to U+2188. This range includes both upper- and lowercase numerals, as well as pre-combined characters for numbers up to 12. One justification for the existence of pre-combined numbers is to facilitate the setting of multiple-letter numbers (such as VIII) on a single horizontal line in Asian vertical text. The Unicode standard, however, includes special Roman numeral code points for compatibility only, stating that "[f]or most purposes, it is preferable to compose the Roman numerals from sequences of the appropriate Latin letters". The block also includes some apostrophus symbols for large numbers, an old variant of "L" (50) similar to the Etruscan character, the Claudian letter "reversed C", etc.

== See also ==
- Biquinary
- Egyptian numerals
- Hebrew numerals
- Kharosthi numerals
- Maya numerals
- Chinese numerals
- Roman abacus
- Proto-writing

== Sources ==
- Chrisomalis, Stephen (2010). Numerical Notation: A Comparative History. Cambridge University Press. ISBN 978-0-521-87818-0.
- Menninger, Karl (1992). Number Words and Number Symbols: A Cultural History of Numbers. Dover Publications. ISBN 978-0-486-27096-8.
