= Odes 1.1 =

Odes 1.1: 23 BC, Rome

Odes 1.1, also known by its incipit, Maecenas atavis edite regibus, is the first of the Odes of Horace. This ode forms the prologue to the three books of lyrics published by Horace in 23 BC and is a dedication to the poet's friend and patron, Maecenas. The metre of the poem, like the final poem of book 3, is a stichic version of the Asclepiad, known as the "1st Asclepiad".

== Summary ==
After the first two lines addressed to Maecenas, which virtually dedicate the whole collection to him, Horace rehearses the various interests of men, that at the end he may present his own ambition. Some men seek fame in athletic games or in politics (3–8), others have lower aims—riches, agriculture, commerce, epicurean ease, war, or hunting (9–28); but as for me, I have the loftiest aim of all, Maecenas—to wear the ivy wreath and be the Muse's dear companion. Rank me with the lyrists of Greece, and I shall indeed "knock at a star with my exalted head" (29–34). (Note: For similar Apology for Poetry, cf. Hor. Sat. 2. 1. 24; Propert. 4. 8; Verg. G. 2. 475 sqq.; Pind. fr. 221; Solon, fr. 13 (4) 43 sqq.)

== Date ==
This is a dedication of the first three books of the Odes to Maecenas. The first Epode, the first Satire, and the first Epistle are addressed to the same patron and friend. Being the dedication, it was probably among the last of the odes of the first three books to be written. The collection was published in 23 BC.

== Bibliography ==
- Bennett, Charles E. (1901). Horace: Odes and Epodes. Norwood, MA: Allyn and Bacon. pp. 1–2.
- Musurillo, Herbert (1962). "The Poet's Apotheosis: Horace, Odes 1.1". Transactions and Proceedings of the American Philological Association. 93: 230–39. doi:10.2307/283763. JSTOR 283763.

Attribution:

- Moore, Clifford Herschel (1902). Horace: The Odes and Epodes and Carmen Saeculare. United States: American Book Company. pp. 51–5.
- Shorey, Paul; Laing, Gordon J. (1911). Horace: Odes and Epodes (Rev. ed.). Boston, MA: Benj H. Sanborn & Co. pp. 139–44.
