= Asclepiad (poetry) =

Greek and Latin poetic verse form

Diagram of an asclepiad, where "–" is a long syllable and "◡" is a short.

An Asclepiad (Latin: Asclepiadeus) is a line of poetry following a particular metrical pattern. The form is attributed to Asclepiades of Samos and is one of the Aeolic metres.

As with other Aeolic metrical lines, the asclepiad is built around a choriamb. The Asclepiad may be described as a glyconic that has been expanded with one (Lesser Asclepiad) or two (Greater Asclepiad) further choriambs. The pattern (using "–" for a long syllable, "u" for a short and "x" for an "anceps" or free syllable, which can be either – or u) is:

x x  - u u - |  - u u -  u - (Lesser Asclepiad / Asclepiadeus minor)
x x  - u u - | - u u - | - u u -  u - (Greater Asclepiad / Asclepiadeus maior)

In Horace's Odes, there is almost always a caesura after the 6th syllable.

Asclepiads are often found mixed with the pherecratean and glyconic, which have a similar rhythm:

x x  - u u -  - (Pherecratean)
x x  - u u -  u - (Glyconic)

West (1982) designates the Asclepiad as a "choriambically expanded glyconic" with the notation gl^{c} (lesser) or gl^{2c} (greater).

In theory the first two syllables are anceps (either long or short) but in practice Horace always starts the line with two long syllables (except possibly at 1.15.36). The last syllable can have brevis in longo.

Asclepiads were used in Latin by Horace in thirty-four of his odes, as well as by Catullus in Poem 30, and Seneca in six tragedies.

== Asclepiadic systems ==
Asclepiads are found either in stichic form (i.e. used continuously unmixed with other metres) or in 4-line stanzas mixed with glyconics and pherecrateans. The various forms are known as the "1st, 2nd, 3rd, 4th, and 5th asclepiad". The numbering of these, however, differs in different authors. The numbers 1, 2, 3, 4, 5 used by Klingner (1939), Nisbet & Hubbard (1970), D. West (1995), Shackleton Bailey (2008), Mayer (2012), and Becker (2016), (followed here) are called 1, 4, 5, 3, 2 by Wickham (1896) and Raven (1965), and 1, 3, 4, 2, 5 by Page (1895), Bennett (1914) and Rudd (2004). The metre is named after the 3rd century BC poet Asclepiades of Samos, although none of the surviving fragments of that poet are in asclepiads.

In Latin, 34 of Horace's 103 Odes are written in various forms of asclepiads. Asclepiads are also found in Seneca the Younger and in Ausonius. Catullus has one poem (30) using the greater asclepiad, and a number of others combining pherecrateans and glyconics without the asclepiad line.

=== 1st asclepiad ===
This consists of a series of (lesser) asclepiad lines used stichically, as in Horace, Odes 1.1, addressed to Horace's patron Maecenas:

Maecēnās atavīs ēdite rēgibus

'Maecenas, descended from ancestral kings, ...'

And also famously in Ode 3.30, the last ode of the collection (Odes 1–3):

exēgī monument(um) aere perennius
rēgālīque sitū pȳramid(um) altius

'I have completed a monument more lasting than bronze
and taller than the royal structure of the pyramids'

This form of the asclepiad is also used in several poems by Alcaeus, e.g. 349A–353.

=== 2nd asclepiad ===
(= Raven and Wickham's 4th, Page and Rudd's 3rd asclepiad)

Three asclepiads are followed by a glyconic, as in Horace, Odes 1.6, addressed to Marcus Vipsanius Agrippa:

scrībēris Variō fortis et hostium
victor Maeoniī carminis ālite
quam rem cumque ferōx nāvibus aut equīs
mīles tē duce gesserit

'You will be written as valiant and victorious over our enemies
by Varius, the winged poet of Homeric poetry,
whatever action with ships or cavalry our fierce
soldiers have carried out under your leadership.'

This form is also found in Alcaeus (5 and 7).

=== 3rd asclepiad ===
(= Raven and Wickham's 5th, Page and Rudd's 4th asclepiad)

This consists of two asclepiads followed by a pherecratean and a glyconic, as in Horace, Odes 1.5:

quis multā gracilis tē puer in rosā
perfūsus liquidīs urget odōribus
grātō, Pyrrha, sub antrō?
cui flāvam religās comam...?

'What slender boy, lying on many roses,
liberally anointed with liquid perfumes,
is pressing you, Pyrrha, beneath a pleasant grotto?
For whom are you tying back your golden hair...?'

=== 4th asclepiad ===
(= Raven and Wickham's 3rd, Page and Rudd's 2nd asclepiad)

A glyconic followed by an asclepiad, as in Horace, Odes 1.3, addressed to a ship carrying Horace's friend Virgil to Greece:

sīc tē dīva potēns Cyprī
sīc frātrēs Helenae, lūcida sīdera,
ventōrumque regat pater
obstrictīs aliīs praeter Iāpyga

'So may the powerful goddess of Cyprus,
so may Helen's brothers, those shining stars,
may the King of the Winds guide you
having locked up the other winds, apart from Iapyx.'

=== 5th asclepiad ===
(= Raven and Wickham's 2nd, Page and Rudd's 5th asclepiad)

A series of greater asclepiads, used stichically, as in Catullus (30), which begins:

Alfēn(e), immemor atqu(e) ūnanimīs false sodālibus,
iam te nīl miseret, dūre, tuī dulcis amīculī?

'Alfenus, forgetful and false to your faithful comrades,
do you now have no compassion, heartless one, for your sweet little friend?'

It is also used in three odes by Horace (1.11, 1.18, and 4.10). 1.18 opens as follows:

nūllam, Vāre, sacrā vīte prius sēveris arborem
circā mīte solum Tīburis et moenia Cātilī

'Plant no tree, Varus, sooner than the sacred vine
around the gentle soil of Tibur and Catillus' city walls.'

In surviving Greek poetry this form is found in Alcaeus (e.g. 340–9), Callimachus (frag. 400), and Theocritus (28, 30).

== In English verse ==
The asclepiad has sometimes been imitated in English verse, for example in Sir Philip Sidney's Arcadia:

Here wrongs name is unheard: slander a monster is
Keep thy sprite from abuse, here no abuse doth haunte.
What man grafts in a tree dissimulatiön?

— Sidney: "O sweet woods the delight of solitariness!", lines 26–28

It is also found in W. H. Auden's "In Due Season", which begins:

Springtime, Summer and Fall: days to behold a world
Antecedent to our knowing, where flowers think
Theirs concretely in scent-colors and beasts, the same
Age all over, pursue dumb horizontal lives.
On one level of conduct and so cannot be
Secretary to man's plot to become divine.

— Auden: "In Due Season", lines 1–6

== Printed sources ==
- Becker, A. S. (2016). "What's Latin about Latin Versification or Why Asclepiads Aren't Boring: A Case Study of Accent and Meter in Horatian Lyric". American Journal of Philology, 137(2), 287–320.
- Nisbet, R. G. M.; Hubbard, M. (1970). A Commentary on Horace Odes book 1. Oxford University Press.
- Raven, D. S. (1965). Latin Metre. Faber & Faber.
- West, M. L. (1982). Greek Metre. Oxford University Press.
