= Aeolic verse =

Class of Ancient Greek poetic form

Aeolic verse is a classification of Ancient Greek lyric poetry referring to the distinct verse forms characteristic of the two great poets of Archaic Lesbos, Sappho and Alcaeus, who composed in their native Aeolic dialect. These verse forms were taken up and developed by later Greek and Roman poets and some modern European poets.

== General description ==
=== Essential features and origin ===
Sappho and Alcaeus' verses differ from most other Greek lyric poetry in their metrical construction:

- Verses consist of a fixed number of syllables (thus, for example, no resolution, contraction, or biceps elements).
- Consecutive anceps syllables may occur, especially at the beginning of the verse (where two initial anceps syllables are called the aeolic base). (This forms an exception to the principle, otherwise observed in Greek verse, (Note: Some scholars argue against this statement.) that two successive unmarked elements are not permitted. Lines beginning with multiple anceps syllables are also exceptional in not being classifiable as having rising or falling rhythm.)

Antoine Meillet and later scholars, by comparison to Vedic meter, have seen in these principles and in other tendencies (the sequence ... – u u – u – ..., the alternation of blunt and pendant verses (Note: sometimes called masculine and feminine, respectively.) conserved traces of Proto-Indo-European poetic practices.

In Sappho and Alcaeus, the three basic metrical groups – u u – u – (dodrans or choriambo-cretic), – u u – (choriamb) and – u – (cretic) figure importantly, and groups are sometimes joined (in what is probably a Greek innovation) by a link anceps. Aeolic poems may be stichic (with all lines having the same metrical form), or composed in more elaborate stanzas or strophes.

=== Choriambic nucleus and expansion ===
One analysis of Aeolic verses' various forms identifies a choriambic nucleus ( – u u – ), which is sometimes subject to:

- dactylic expansion (some number of dactyls preceding the choriamb, or "prolongation" of the pattern that alternates long elements with double-short elements);
- choriambic expansion ("juxtaposition" of additional choriambs).

For example, an Asclepiad may be analyzed as a glyconic with choriambic expansion (gl^{c}, gl^{2c}), and a glyconic with dactylic expansion produces the stichic length (x x – u u – u u – u u – u – , or gl^{2d}) in which Sappho composed the poems collected in Book II.

In this analysis, a wide variety of Aeolic verses (whether in Sappho and Alcaeus, or in later choral poetry) are analyzed as a choriambic nucleus (sometimes expanded, as just mentioned), usually preceded by anceps syllables and followed by various single-short sequences (e.g. u – , u – u – , and, by the principle of brevis in longo, u – u – – , u – – , – ), with various additional allowances to accommodate the practice of the later poets. By also taking the cretic unit, mentioned above, into account, this analysis can also, for example, understand the third line of the Alcaic stanza—and other stanza lines as in Sappho frr. 96, 98, 99—as Aeolic in nature, and appreciate how the initial three syllables of the Sapphic hendecasyllable were not variable in Sappho's practice.

=== Names of basic lengths ===
Ancient metricians such as Hephaestion give us a long list of names for various Aeolic lengths, to which modern scholars have added. For the most part, these names are arbitrary or even misleading, but they are widely used in scholarly writing. The following are the names for units with an unexpanded "choriambic nucleus" (i.e.: – u u – ):

verse-end	verse-begin
verse-end	x x (aeolic base)	x ("acephalous line")	no anceps syllables
u – –	hipponactean (Note: Not to be confused with the choliambic line, sometimes also given this name by association with Hipponax.) (Latin: hipponacteus): x x – u u – u – – (hipp)	hagesichorean (Note: So called by M.L. West after its use in Alcman, fr. 1; also called (choriambic) enoplian (Dale), or Achtsilber (Snell).) (Latin: octosyllabus): x – u u – u – – (^hipp)	aristophanean (Latin: aristophaneus): – u u – u – –
u –	glyconic (Latin: glyconeus): x x – u u – u – (gl)	telesillean (Latin: telesilleus): x – u u – u – (^gl)	dodrans (Note: "Dodrans" may also refer to the rarer "reversed dodrans" or "dodrans B": x x – u u – .) – u u – u –
–	pherecratean (Latin: pherecrateus): x x – u u – – (pher)	reizianum (Latin: reizianus): x – u u – – (^pher)	adonean (Latin: adoneus): – u u – –

Comparison, with "choriambic nucleus" emphasized:

x x – u u – u – – (hipp)
  x – u u – u – – (^hipp)
x x – u u – u –   (gl)
  x – u u – u –   (^gl)
x x – u u –   –   (pher)
  x – u u –   –   (^pher)

== Sappho and Alcaeus' verse ==
=== The meters of the Sapphic corpus ===
Because the Alexandrian edition of Sappho's works divided the poems into books mostly based on their meter, an overview of its contents is a convenient starting point for an account of the Lesbian poets' meters.

Book I (fragments 1 – 42)	Sapphic stanza
Book II (frr. 43 – 52)	x x – u u – u u – u u – u – (gl^{2d}) (Note: Sometimes misleadingly called "Aeolic dactyls," but this is an unlikely interpretation.)
Book III (frr. 53 – 57)	Greater Asclepiad (gl^{2c}), marked off in distichs
Book IV (frr. 58 – 91)	x – u u – – u u – – u u – u – – (^hipp^{2c}, called aiolikon by Hephaestion), marked off in distichs; the book may also have contained three-line stanzas. (Note: First suggested by Eva-Maria Hamm in 1954; recently argued for by Lucia Prauscello (2016) and Luigi Battezzato (2018).)
Book V (frr. 92 – 101)	probably consisting of poems in various three-line stanzas
Book VI	contents unknown
Book VII (fr. 102)	featuring the verse u – u – u – – u u – u – u – – (not usually analyzed by "Aeolic" principles) (Note: However, Hephaestion's analysis x – u – x x – u u – u – u – – may be analyzed as anceps + cretic + a sequence whose acephalic variant x – u u – u – u – – is found in Sappho fr. 154 (cf. fr. 133) and may have been used stichically (ibid. p. 124). Others note that the verse may be seen as the Anacreontic preceded by the shortened version found in Anacreon 429 PMG, with the two units separated by word-end. Bacchylides uses the verse in an "aeolic" context (the strophe of Ode 6, where there is not only word-end between the "Anacreontic" lengths, but a line break in the papyrus text).)
Book VIII (fr. 103)	a short book, the fragmentary evidence for which is "nearly but not quite compatible with" – u u – – u u – – u u – u – – (aristoph^{2c})
Book IX (frr. 104 – 117)	epithalamia in other meters, including dactylic hexameter, pher^{2d}, pher^{d}, aristoph^{2c}, and less easily summarized lengths
unclassified fragments (frr. 118 – 213)	various meters

=== Sappho and Alcaeus' meters ===
Sappho and Alcaeus' poetic practice had in common, not just the general principles sketched above, but many specific verse forms. For example, the Sapphic stanza, which represents such a large part of Sappho's surviving poetry, is also well represented in Alcaeus' work (e.g. Alcaeus frr. 34, 42, 45, 308b, 362). Alcaeus frr. 38a and 141 use the same meter as Book II of Sappho, and Alcaeus frr. 340 – 349 the Greater Asclepiad as in Book III. One notable form is the Alcaic stanza (e.g. Alcaeus frr. 6, 129, 325 – 339), but this too is found in both poets (Sappho frr. 137 – 138). (Note: The attribution of fr. 137 (the more substantial of the two fragments) to Sappho is doubted, based in part on the meter, by Gregory Nagy, "Did Sappho and Alcaeus ever meet? Symmetries of myth and ritual in performing the songs of ancient Lesbos," in Literatur und Religion 1: Wege zu einer mythisch-rituellen Poetik bei den Griechen, ed. Anton Bierl et al., Walter de Gruyter, 2007, who sees Alcaeus as "the notional composer." G. O. Hutchinson judges that "The application and at the very least the later part of [Sappho fr. 137] are likely to be inauthentic, but are certainly as early as Aristotle."))

Many of the additional meters found in Sappho and Alcaeus are similar to the ones discussed above, and similarly analyzable. For example, Sappho frr. 130 – 131 (and the final lines of fr. 94's stanzas) are composed in a shortened version (gl^{d}) of the meter used in Book II of her poetry. However, the surviving poetry also abounds in fragments in other meters, both stanzaic and stichic, some of them more complicated or uncertain in their metrical construction. Some fragments use meters from non-Aeolic traditions (e.g. dactylic hexameter, or the Ionic meter of Sappho fr. 134).

== Choral Aeolics ==
The versification of Pindar and Bacchylides' 5th century BC choral poetry can largely be divided into dactylo-epitrite and "aeolic" types of composition. This later style of "aeolic" verse shows fundamental similarities to, but also several important differences from, the practice of the Aeolic poets. In common with Sappho and Alcaeus, in the aeolic odes of Pindar and Bacchylides:

- Two or more consecutive anceps syllables may occur at the beginning or middle of a verse (see e.g. Pindar, Nemean 4).
- There are many metrical sequences formed by prolongation, including both double-short (as in the dactylic expansion discussed above) and single-short units together (mostly double-short before single-short, e.g. – u u – u – , but also the reverse, e.g. – u – u u – , which is uncharacteristic of Sappho and Alcaeus).

These connections justify the name "Aeolic" and clearly distinguish the mode from dactylo-epitrite (which does not use consecutive anceps syllables, and which combines double-short and single-short in a single verse, but not in a single metrical group). But there are several important innovations in the "aeolic" practice of Pindar and Bacchylides:

- Verses are no longer isosyllabic (e.g., Pindar may use u u in place of – by resolution).
- Anceps syllables are mostly realized the same way in a given location (and the aeolic base is more limited in its possible realizations).
- Verse forms and sequences are more varied, so that description with reference to the earlier practice must speak of expansions, shortenings, acephalic verses, cholosis, etc.

The tragic poets of Classical Athens continued the use of Aeolic verse (and dactylo-epitrite, with the addition of other types) for their choral odes, with additional metrical freedoms and innovations. Aeschylus, Sophocles, and Euripides each went his own way in developing Aeolics.

== Hellenistic Aeolics ==
Theocritus provides an example of the Hellenistic adaptation of Aeolic poetry in his Idylls 28 – 31, which also imitate the Archaic Aeolic dialect. Idyll 29, a pederastic love poem, "which is presumably an imitation of Alcaeus and opens with a quotation from him," is in the same meter as Book II of Sappho. The other three poems are composed in the Greater Asclepiad meter (like Sappho, Book III). Also in the third century BC, a hymn by Aristonous is composed in glyconic-pherecratean stanzas, and Philodamus' paean to Dionysus is partly analyzable by Aeolic principles.

== Latin Aeolics ==
Aeolic forms were included in the general Roman habit of using Greek forms in Latin poetry. Among the lyric poets, Catullus used glyconic-pherecratean stanzas (Catullus 34, 61), the Phalaecian hendecasyllable (many compositions), the Greater Asclepiad (Catullus 30) and the Sapphic stanza (Catullus 11 and 51, an adaptation of Sappho fr. 31). (Note: See List of poems by Catullus § Main list) Horace extended and standardized the use of Aeolics in Latin, also using the Alcaic stanza, the Lesser Asclepiad, and hipponacteans. In the summing-up poem "Exegi monumentum" (Odes 3.30), Horace makes the somewhat exaggerated claim:

princeps Aeolium carmen ad Italos
deduxisse modos

I was able to be the first to bring Aeolian song
to Italian measures.

—Trans. David West

== In Imperial Greek poetry ==
In later Greek poetry, the phalaecian was widely used by poets including writers of epigram. The ode to Rome (Supplementum Hellenisticum 541) in Sapphic stanzas by "Melinno" (probably writing during the reign of Hadrian) "is an isolated piece of antiquarianism."

== In post-Classical poetry ==
Especially through the influence of Horace, Aeolic forms have sometimes been employed in post-Classical poetry. For example, Asclepiads have been used by Sidney and W.H. Auden. Poets in English such as Isaac Watts, William Cowper, Algernon Charles Swinburne, Allen Ginsberg, and James Wright have used the Sapphic stanza. In German, Friedrich Hölderlin excelled in Alcaic and Asclepiadic odes. Hungarian poets such as Dániel Berzsenyi and Mihály Babits have also written in Alcaics.
