= Verso sciolto =

Italian blank verse poetry

In Italian poetry, verso sciolto (plural versi sciolti, lit. 'loose verse') refers to poetry written in hendecasyllables and lacking rhyme. It is very similar to blank verse in English poetry, and the two terms are often used interchangeably.
