= Catullus 1 =

Latin poem by Catullus

Catullus 1 is a poem by Roman poet Gaius Valerius Catullus (c. 84–c. 54 BCE) written in hendecasyllabic meter, a common form in his poetry.

Although it was traditionally arranged first among his poems, though it was not necessarily the first poem that he wrote. It is dedicated to Cornelius Nepos, a historian and minor poet, though some consider Catullus's praise of Cornelius's history of the Italians to have been sarcastic.

Catullus 1 read in Latin, English subtitles

The poem alternates between humility and a self-confident manner; Catullus calls his poetry "little" and "trifles", but asks that it remain for more than one age. This understatement is likely deliberate; Catullus knows very well the quality of his poetry, and also the provocative form it has. He also calls his work "new"; the poems are recently made and therefore new, but they are also new as some of the first examples of Neoteric poetry in the Latin language.

== Text ==
Line	Latin text	English translation
1	cui dono lepidum novum libellum	To whom do I dedicate this new, charming little book
2	arida modo pumice expolitum	just now polished with a dry pumice stone?
3	Corneli tibi namque tu solebas	To you, Cornelius, for you were accustomed
4	meas esse aliquid putare nugas	to think that my nonsense was something,
5	iam tum cum ausus es unus Italorum	even then when you alone dared to unfold
6	omne aevum tribus explicare cartis^{1}	the entire history of the Italians in three papyrus rolls,
7	doctis Iuppiter et laboriosis	learned, by Jupiter, and full of labor.
8	quare habe tibi quidquid hoc libelli	Therefore, have for yourself whatever this is of a little book,
9	qualecumque quod o^{2} patrona virgo^{3}	of whatever sort; which, O patron maiden,
10	plus uno maneat perenne saeclo	may it remain everlasting, more than one lifetime.

== Translations ==
Earliest translation in English can be found in the anonymous novel The Adventures of Catullus, and History of his Amours With Lesbia. Intermixt With Translations of his Choicest Poems. By Several Hands. Done From the French (London: printed for J. Chantry, 1707), the translation from French of galant novel by Jean de La Chapelle «Amours de Catulle» (1680):

To whom should I but to Cornelius make
A Present of my little merry Book.
Who will protect it for its Author's sake,
And on each Page just finish'd kindly look.
Since thou Cornelius hast been pleas'd to think
My triffling ludicrous Essays,
Not wholly undeserving Pen and Ink,
But sometimes even worthy of thy Praise;
E'en then when thou of all the Roman Race
The Roman Annals durst indite,
With such a learned and laborious Grace
As ravishes our Ears and Sight.
Wherefore accept it whatsoe'er its Faults,
Whate'er its Excellencies be,
Pallas will sure prolong the Verse and Thoughts,
Beyond an Age that are inscrib'd to thee.

== Notes ==
1. "To unfold the entire age in three papyrus rolls" can be less literally rendered as "To give an account of all recorded history in three volumes", and refers to Cornelius Nepos' Chronica ("Annals"), an exhaustive three-volume history of the Greco-Roman world.
2. O does not appear in any extant manuscripts, but is supplied by modern editors on the assumption that it was in the original, based on context and metrical concerns.
3. The "patron maiden" may be either Minerva or one of the Muses.

== Bibliography ==
- Batstone, William (1998). "Dry Pumice and the Programmatic Language of Catullus 1". Classical Philology. 93 (2): 126–135. doi:10.1086/449383.
- Rauk, John (1997). "Time and History in Catullus 1". Classical World. 90 (5): 319–332. doi:10.2307/4351959. JSTOR 4351959.
