= Dodrans =

The dodrans (a contraction of Latin dequadrans: "less a quarter") or nonuncium (from Latin nona uncia: "ninth twelfth") was an Ancient Roman bronze coin produced during the Roman Republic.

The dodrans, valued at three quarters of an as (nine unciae), was produced only twice:

- in 126 BC by C. Cassius, in combination with the bes, another very rare denomination which was valued at two thirds of an as.
- in the 2nd century BC by M. Caecilius Metellus Q. f. (perhaps Marcus Caecilius Metellus, consul 115 BC), in combination with the denarius and other Æ coins, e.g. the semis, triens, and quadrans.

Dodrans as a unit may refer to a time span of forty-five minutes (three quarters of an hour) or a length of nine inches (three quarters of a foot).

It has also been used to refer to the metrical pattern – ᴗ ᴗ – ᴗ x, which constitutes the last three quarters of the glyconic line. Also called the choriambo-cretic, the pattern is common in Aeolic verse.

"Dodrans" is the root of "dodranscentennial" (75th anniversary) and "dodransbicentennial" (175th anniversary).

== See also ==
- Roman currency
- Ancient Greek coinage
