= Glyconic =

Verse of the classic meter

Glyconic (from Glycon, a Greek lyric poet) is a form of meter in classical Greek and Latin poetry. The glyconic line is the most basic and most commonly used form of Aeolic verse, and it is often combined with others.

The basic shape (often abbreviated as gl) is as follows:

x x – u u – u –

Here "x" indicates an anceps, "–" a longum, and "u" a brevis. "x x" is known as the Aeolic base, which can be a spondeus "– –", a trochee "– u", or an iamb "u –". The middle foot "– u u –" is a choriambus, as a so-called choriambic nucleus is a defining element of Aeolic verse. As in all classical verse forms, the phenomenon of brevis in longo is observed, so although the last syllable can actually be short or long, it always "counts" as long.

== Related metres ==
Runs of glyconic lines are often ended by a pherecratean (a catalectic glyconic, gl^):

x x – u u – –

The acephalous ("headless") version (^gl), also known as the telesillean (Latin: telesilleus), is:

x – u u – u –

The glyconic can also be expanded into the lesser and greater asclepiad lines:

x x – u u – – u u – u –
x x – u u – – u u – – u u – u –

By expanding the ending of the line, it becomes the phalaecian hendecasyllable, often used by Catullus and Martial:

x x – u u – u – u – –

== Origin of the glyconic ==
Some of the earliest poems in any Indo-European language, the Vedic hymns of India, are composed mainly in iambic metre, in lines of eight, eleven or twelve syllables, with occasional irregularities in the first part of the line. Noting this, the metrician Paul Kiparsky posits that the Greek glyconic and its related metres originated in the same way from an originally iambic metre.

Thus, by substitution of a trochee for an iamb in the 3rd and 4th syllables, but keeping the iambic ending, an original iambic dimeter could change to a glyconic:

x – u – | u – u – (iambic dimeter)
x x – u | u – u – (glyconic)

(A similar change is often seen in Vedic verse). Longer metres are derived by Kiparsky from the iambic trimeter, for example, the hendecasyllable and lesser asclepiad:

x – u – | u – u – | u – u – (iambic trimeter)
x x – u | u – u – | u – – (Phalaecian hendecasyllable)
x x – u | u – – u | u – u – (lesser asclepiad)

This switch of an iamb for a trochee or vice versa is known as anaclasis. Anaclasis is sometimes found in the glyconic metre itself, as appears from the Euripides example below:

x x – u | u – u – (normal glyconic)
uu u – – | – u u – (anaclastic glyconic)

== Greek examples ==
=== Anacreon ===
An example of a poem combining glyconics and a pherecratean is the following fragment of Anacreon, a hymn to the goddess Artemis:

γουνοῦμαι σ᾽ ἐλαφηβόλε,
ξανθὴ παῖ Διός, ἀγρίων
δέσποιν᾽ Ἄρτεμι θηρῶν

gounoûmai s᾽ elaphēbóle,
xanthḕ paî Diós, agríōn
déspoin᾽ Ártemi thērôn

– – – u u – u – (2x)
– – – u u – –

"I clasp your knees, shooter of deer,
blonde daughter of Zeus, Artemis,
mistress of wild animals."

=== Euripides ===
Choruses in aeolic metres are common in Euripides. In his glyconics he often splits or resolves a long syllable into two short ones. This can even happen at the end of the line, provided there is no pause between one line and the next.

The following example is from Euripides' Phoenissae (202–213). Most of the lines are glyconic, but there are two pherecrateans, and one telesillean. Two of the lines display anaclasis, that is, the substitution of a choriamb (– u u –) for a double iamb (u – u –) in the last four syllables:

Τύριον οἶδμα λιποῦσʼ ἔβαν
ἀκροθίνια Λοξίᾳ
Φοινίσσας ἀπὸ νάσου
Φοίβῳ δούλα μελάθρων,
ἵνʼ ὑπὸ δειράσι νιφοβόλοις
Παρνασοῦ κατενάσθη,

Ἰόνιον κατὰ πόντον ἐλά-
τᾳ πλεύσασα περιρρύτων
ὑπὲρ ἀκαρπίστων πεδίων
Σικελίας Ζεφύρου πνοαῖς
ἱππεύσαντος, ἐν οὐρανῷ
κάλλιστον κελάδημα.

Túrion oîdma lipoûsʼ éban
akrothínia Loxíāi
Phoiníssas apò násou
Phoíbōi doúla meláthrōn,
hínʼ hupò deirási niphobólois
Parnasoû katenásthē,

Iónion katà pónton elá-
tāi pleúsasa perirrhútōn
hupèr akarpístōn pedíōn
Sikelías Zephúrou pnoaîs
hippeúsantos, en ouranôi
kálliston keládēma.

uu u – u u – u – (gl)
– u – u u – u – (gl)
– – – u u – – (ph)
– – – – u u – (te with anaclasis)
uu u – u u uu u – (gl)
– – – u u – – (ph)

uu – u u – u uu (gl)
u – – u u – u – (gl)
uu u – – – u u – (gl with anaclasis)
uu u – u u – u – (gl)
– – – u u – u – (gl)
– – – u u – – (ph)

"From the Tyrian swell of the sea I came, a choice offering for Loxias from the island of Phoenicia, to be a slave to Phoebus in his halls, where he dwells under the snow-swept peaks of Parnassus; through the Ionian sea I sailed in the waves, over the unharvested plains, in the gusts of Zephyrus that ride from Sicily, sweetest music in the sky." (translated by E. P. Coleridge)

== Latin examples ==
=== Catullus ===
Catullus 61 is a wedding song consisting of 47 stanzas (with some lines missing) each with four glyconics followed by a pherecratean. It begins with an address to Hymen, god of wedding ceremonies:

Collis ō Helicōniī
cultor, Ūraniae genus,
qui rapis tener(am) ad virum
virgin(em), ō Hymenae(e) Hymēn,
ō Hymēn Hymenaee.

– u – u u – u – (4x)
– u – u u – –

"Cultivator of Mount Helicon,
son of Urania,
you who seize a tender virgin for a husband,
o Hymenaeus Hymen,
o Hymen Hymenaeus."

Catullus 34 is written in a similar metre, but with stanzas consisting of three glyconics + a pherecratean.

The combination of a single glyconic and pherecratean is sometimes given the name priapean (Latin: priapeus). It is used in the Appendix Vergiliana (Priapea 3), and in Catullus 17. Catullus 17, addressed to a certain village which held a festival on a dangerously shaky bridge across a marsh, begins as follows:

o Colōnia, quae cupis ponte lūdere longō
– u – u u – u – | – u – u u – –
"O Colonia, who desire to hold a festival on a long bridge"

=== Horace ===
The poet Horace does not use glyconics on their own, but in combination with asclepiad lines (a kind of expanded glyconic) and sometimes also with pherecratean lines. An example is the following, which alternates glyconics with the lesser asclepiad:

dōnec grātus eram tibī
nec quisquam potior bracchia candidae
cervīcī iuvenis dabat,
Persārum viguī rēge beātior

– – – u u – u – (glyconic)
– – – u u – – u u – u – (lesser asclepiad)
– – – u u – u –
– – – u u – – u u – u –

"As long as I was pleasing to you,
and no better young man used to put
his arms round your white neck,
I flourished more happy than the king of the Persians."

The various different combinations are referred to by modern scholars as "1st, 2nd, 3rd, 4th, and 5th asclepiad". However, different authors disagree as to which combination has which number.

=== Seneca ===
The first two syllables of the line (known as an "aeolic base") are often a trochee (– u) in Catullus, but are usually standardised to a spondee (– –) in Horace's version of the metre. Seneca in his tragedies has two different styles. In Hercules Furens 875–94 he writes a chorus of glyconics with every line beginning with a spondee (– –), but in Oedipus 882–914 every line begins with a trochee (– u). In one line in the latter play he contracts the two short syllables into a long one:

tūta mē mediā vehat
vīta dēcurrēns viā

– u – u u – u –
– u – – – u –

"May a safe life convey me as it runs along by a middle way."
