= Phalaecus (poet) =

Ancient Greek poet

Phalaecus (Ancient Greek: Φάλαικος, romanized: Phalaikos) was an Ancient Greek lyric and epigrammatic poet, from whom the meter called Phalaecian(Ancient Greek: Φαλαίκειον) took its name. He is occasionally referred to by the grammarians, but they give no information respecting his works, except that he composed hymns to Hermes. The line quoted by Hephaestion is evidently the first verse of a hymn. He seems to have been distinguished as an epigrammatist, and five of his epigrams are still preserved in the Greek Anthology, besides the one quoted by Athenaeus.

The age of Phalaecus is uncertain. The conjecture of Reiske is founded on an epigram which does not properly belong to this writer. A more probable indication of his date is furnished by another epigram, in which he mentions the actor Lycon, who lived in the time of Alexander the Great, but this epigram also is of somewhat doubtful authorship. At all events he was probably one of the principal Alexandrian poets.

== Phalaecian verse ==
The Phalaecian verse is well known from its frequent use by the Roman poets. The Roman grammarians also call it Hendecasyllabus. Its normal form, which admits of many variations, is much older than Phalaecus, whose name is given to it not because he invented it, but because he especially used it. It is a very ancient and important lyric metre. Sappho frequently used it, and it is even called the "Sapphic or Phalalecian" meter. No example of it is found in the extant fragments of Sappho; but it occurs in those of Anacreon and Simonides, in Cratinus, in Sophocles, and other ancient Greek poets.
