= Asclepiades of Samos =

Ancient Greek epigrammatist and lyric poet

Asclepiades of Samos (Sicelidas) (Greek: Ἀσκληπιάδης ὁ Σάμιος; born c. 320 BC) was an ancient Greek epigrammatist and lyric poet who flourished around 270 BC. He was a friend of Hedylus and possibly of Theocritus. He may have been honoured by the city of Histiaea in about 263 BC.

Asclepiades was the earliest and most important of the convivial and erotic epigrammists. Only a few of his compositions were intended as actual inscriptions, if any. Other poems praise those poets whom he especially admired, but the majority of his work that has survived is love songs. It is doubtful whether he is the author of all the epigrams (some 40 in number) which bear his name in the Greek Anthology. He has been credited with creating the metre which bears his name, the Asclepiad metre.

The sole source for the known, unlacunaed epigrams of Asclepiades is the Greek Anthology. Most of Asclepiades's epigrams appear in both of the two principal Byzantine epigram collections that constitute the Greek Anthology: the Palatine Anthology and the Planudean Anthology. Epigrams xxxix and xliii appear only in the Planudean Anthology, which is the less complete of the two so far as the epigrams of Asclepiades are concerned, all the rest are in the Palatine Anthology. Some papyri have been recovered that contain portions of known epigrams and portions of otherwise unknown epigrams attributed to Asclepiades.

== Editions ==
- Gow, A. S. F.; Page, Denys, eds. (1965). The Greek Anthology: Hellenistic Epigrams. Vol. i. pp. 44–56. with commentary in ii pp. 114–151.
- Sens, Alexander, ed. (2011). Asclepiades of Samos: Epigrams and Fragments. Oxford, England: Oxford University Press. ISBN 978-0-19-925319-7. Translated by Alexander Sens
