= Cornelius Nepos =

Roman historian and biographer (c.110 BC–c.25 BC)

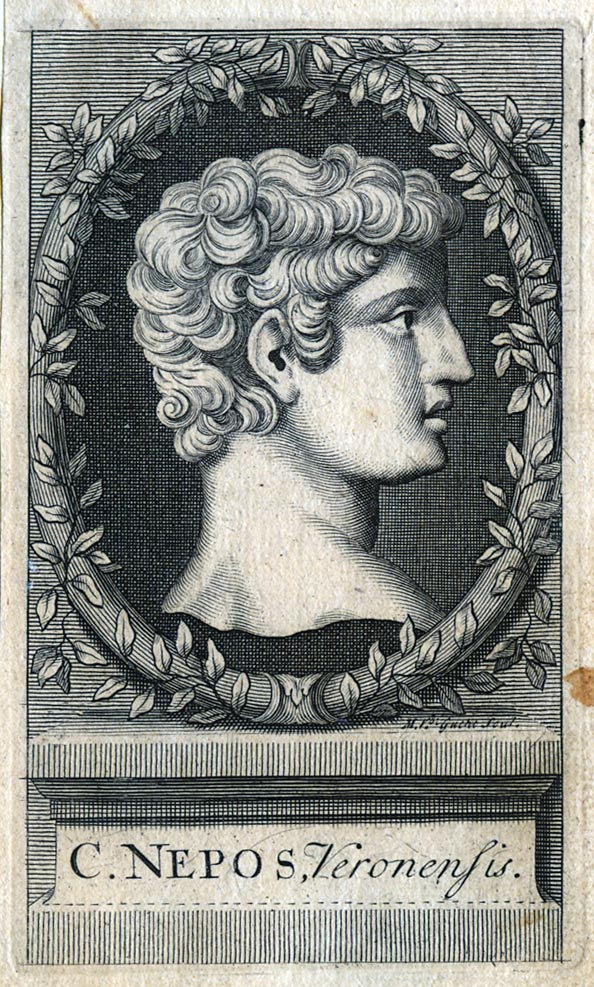
Cornelius Nepos

Cornelius Nepos (/kɔːrˈniːliəs ˈniːpɒs, ˈnɛpɒs/; c. 110 BC – c. 25 BC) was a Roman biographer.

== Biography ==
Nepos's Cisalpine birth is attested by Ausonius, and Pliny the Elder calls him Padi accola ("a dweller on the River Po", Naturalis historia III.127). He was born at Hostilia, a village in Cisalpine Gaul not far from Verona, or at Ticinum (modern Pavia).

He was a friend of Catullus, who dedicates his poems to him (I.3), Cicero and Titus Pomponius Atticus. Eusebius places him in the fourth year of the reign of Augustus, which is supposed to be when he began to attract critical acclaim by his writing. Pliny the Elder notes he died in the reign of Augustus (Natural History IX.39, X.23).

== Works ==
=== De viris illustribus ===
Nepos's De viris illustribus consisted of parallel lives of distinguished Romans and foreigners, in sixteen books. It originally included "descriptions of foreign and Roman kings, generals, lawyers, orators, poets, historians, and philosophers". However, the sole surviving book (which is thought to be complete) is the Excellentium imperatorum vitae ("Lives of the Eminent Commanders"), which covers commanders and generals (imperatores); its contents are as follows:

- Miltiades
- Themistocles
- Aristides
- Pausanias
- Cimon
- Lysander
- Alcibiades
- Thrasybulus
- Conon
- Dion
- Iphicrates
- Chabrias
- Timotheus
- Datames
- Epaminondas
- Pelopidas
- Agesilaus
- Eumenes
- Phocion
- Timoleon
- On Kings
- Hamilcar
- Hannibal

Two additional lives survive from elsewhere in the De viris illustribus:

- Cato
- Atticus

The Excellentium imperatorum vitae appeared in the reign of Theodosius I, as the work of the grammarian Aemilius Probus, who presented it to the emperor with a dedication in Latin verse. He claims it to have been the work of his mother or father (the manuscripts vary) and his grandfather. Despite the obvious questions (such as why the preface addressed to someone named Atticus when the work was supposedly dedicated to Theodosius), no one seemed to have doubted Probus's authorship. Eventually Peter Cornerus discovered in a manuscript of Cicero's letters the biographies of Cato and Atticus. He added them to the other existing biographies, despite the fact that the writer speaks of himself as a contemporary and friend of Atticus, and that the manuscript bore the heading E libro posteriore Cornelii Nepotis ('from the last book of Cornelius Nepos'). At last Dionysius Lambinus's edition of 1569 bore a commentary demonstrating on stylistic grounds that the work must have been of Nepos alone, and not Aemilius Probus. This view has been tempered by more recent scholarship, which agrees with Lambinus that they are the work of Nepos, but that Probus probably abridged the biographies when he added the verse dedication. The Life of Atticus, however, is considered to be the exclusive composition of Nepos.

=== Other works ===
Nearly all of Nepos's other writings are lost, but several allusions to them survive in works by other authors. Aulus Gellius's Attic Nights are of special importance in this respect.

- Chronica, an epitome of universal history; Catullus seems to allude to the "Chronica" in his dedication to Nepos. Ausonius also mentions it in his sixteenth Epistle to Probus, as does Aulus Gellius in the Noctes Atticae (XVII.21). "Probably a chronological summary which included the history of outside nations as well as of Rome," it is thought to have been written in three books.
- Exempla, a collection of anecdotes after the style of Valerius Maximus; Exemplorum libri, of which Charisius cites the second book, and Aulus Gellius the fifth (VI.18, 19). The book likely contained "models for imitation, drawn from the early Romans, whose simplicity contrasted with the luxury" of Nepos's era."
- Letters to Cicero; De Vita Ciceronis. Aulus Gellius corrects an error in this work (XV.28). The book is thought to have been written after the death of the consul, statesman and orator Cicero. According to Roberts, "his friendship for Cicero and Atticus and his access to their correspondence would have made the work an especially valuable one for us."
- Lives of Cato the Elder; A complete biography of Cato the Censor, from which Aulus Gellius draws an anecdote of Cato (XI.8).
- Epistulae ad Ciceronem, an extract of which survives in Lactantius (Divinarum Institutionum Libri Septem III.15). It is unclear whether they were ever formally published.

Pliny the Younger mentions verse written by Nepos, and in his own Life of Dion, Nepos himself refers to a work of his own authorship, De Historicis. If a separate work, this would be from a hypothesized De Historicis Latinis, only one book in the larger De Viris Illustribus (see above), although exclusively comprising biographies of Romans. Pliny also mentions a longer Life of Cato at the end of the extant Life of Cato, written at the request of Titus Pomponius Atticus, the "complete biography" now lost.
