= Alcaic stanza =

Four-line stanza form

The Alcaic stanza is a Greek lyrical meter, an Aeolic verse form traditionally believed to have been invented by Alcaeus, a lyric poet from Mytilene on the island of Lesbos, about 600 BC. The Alcaic stanza and the Sapphic stanza named for Alcaeus' contemporary, Sappho, are two important forms of Classical poetry. The Alcaic stanza consists of two Alcaic hendecasyllables, followed by an Alcaic enneasyllable and an Alcaic decasyllable.

== In Alcaeus' poetry ==
The Alcaic stanza exists only in a few fragments of Alcaeus's poetry. As used by Alcaeus it has the following scheme (where "–" is a longum, "u" a breve, and "×" an anceps):

× – u – × – u u – u – || (alc11)
× – u – × – u u – u – || (alc11)
× – u – × – u – – ||     (alc9 )
– u u – u u – u – – |||  (alc10)

An example, quoted by Athenaeus, is:

οὐ χρῆ κάκοισι θῦμον ἐπιτρέπην,
προκόψομεν γὰρ οὐδὲν ἀσάμενοι,
ὦ Βύκχι, φαρμάκων δ᾿ ἄριστον
οἶνον ἐνεικαμένοις μεθύσθην.

ou khrê kákoisi thûmon epitrépēn,
prokópsomen gàr oudèn asámenoi,
ô Búkkhi, pharmákōn d᾿ áriston
oînon eneikaménois methústhēn.

'We should not surrender our hearts to our troubles,
for we shall make no headway by grieving,
Bycchis: the best of remedies
is to bring wine and get drunk.'

== In Latin poetry ==
Apart from a single poem of Statius (Silv. 4.5), the Alcaic stanza appears to have been used in Latin only by Horace, who employed it in 37 of his 103 Odes.

In Horace the Alcaic stanza takes this form:

x – u – – : – u u – u –
x – u – – : – u u – u –
x – u – – – u – –
– u u – u u – u – –

(An "–" denotes a long syllable, "u" a short one, x is anceps (long or short), and ":" is the caesura.) The first syllable in lines 1 to 3 is sometimes short (13 times in book 1), but usually long. The 5th syllable, unlike in Greek, is always long. There is almost always a word-break after the 5th syllable.

–    –   u – : –  – u u   – u –
Antehāc nefās dēprōmere Caecubum
 –  –  u – –  : –   u u – u–
cellīs avītīs, dum Capitōliō
    – – u  – –  –   u– –
   Rēgīna dēmentīs ruīnās
      – u  u  –  u u–  u – –
     fūnus et Imperiō parābat. (Odes 1.37, lines 5-8)

'Before this it would have been a sin to bring out the Caecuban
from our grandfathers' cellars, as long as the Queen
was preparing mad ruin for the Capitol
and a funeral for the Empire.'

Certain developments can be observed in the Alcaic stanza over the course of the four books of Horace's Odes. For example, the short syllable at the beginning of the first three lines becomes less frequent in the course of books 1 to 3 and is not found at all in Book 4.

A notable feature of Horace's Alcaics is the heavy word which usually fills the centre of the 3rd line. The most common pattern is for the line to end with a polysyllable + trisyllable (e.g. Augustus adiectīs Britannīs). This puts a word accent on the 5th syllable of the line, which occurs in 67% of the lines. Another form of the line is to end in a polysyllable + disyllable (e.g. Tītānas immānemque turbam). This puts an accent on the 6th syllable of the line. It is uncommon at first (only 5% in book 1 and 6% in book 2) but becomes more common in the later books (25% in book 3 and 30% in book 4).

A tetrasyllable ending in the 3rd line (e.g. nōdō coercēs vīperīnō) or double disyllable ending (e.g. prōnōs relābī posse rīvōs), on the other hand, putting an accent on the 4th syllable of the line, is not common: only 7% in book 1, 8% in book 2; and not found at all in books 3 and 4. But 3rd lines ending with a monosyllable + trisyllable (e.g. stetēre causae cūr perīrent) seem more acceptable, and form 20% of lines in book 1, 15% in book 2, 7% in book 3, and 11% in book 4.

== Imitations in other languages ==
A famous example of English Alcaics is Tennyson's "Milton":

O mighty-mouth'd inventor of harmonies,
O skill'd to sing of Time or Eternity,
God-gifted organ-voice of England,
Milton, a name to resound for ages!

The Alcaic stanza was adapted to use in English and French during the Renaissance. It was very frequently used in Italian poetry of the 19th century, especially by Giosuè Carducci. As in English, the meter is accentual rather than quantitative.

Poi che un sereno vapor d’ambrosia
da la tua còppa diffuso avvolsemi,
o Ebe con passo di dea
trasvolata sorridendo via;

(Giosuè Carducci, "Ideale", from: Odi barbare)

In Polish poetry (in contrast to the Sapphic stanza which was extremely popular since the 16th century) Alcaics were used very rarely. Even in translation Horace's Alcaic stanzas were usually turned into different forms. An example (perhaps the only) of an Alcaic stanza in Polish original literature is Stanisław Trembecki's Ode to Adam Naruszewicz:

O ty, kapłanie Delijskiego świętny,
Przeszłego wiadom, przyszłości pojętny
Wieńcz twe skronie, wieszczą bierz laskę,
Śnieżny ubiór i złotą przepaskę.

Trembecki's verse is syllabic (11/11/9/10). There is no accentual metrical pattern.

German has also used alcaics with some success. They were introduced by Klopstock, and used by Hölderlin, by Johann Heinrich Voss in his translations of Horace, by August Kopisch and other 19th century German poets.
