= Denis Lambin =

French classical scholar

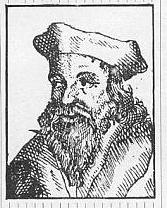
Dionysius Lambinus

Denis Lambin (Latinized as Dionysius Lambinus; 1520 – September 1572) was a French classical scholar.

== Life ==
Lambin was born at Montreuil, Pas-de-Calais. Having devoted several years to classical studies during a residence in Italy, he was invited to Paris in 1550 to fill the professorship of Latin in the Collège de France, which he soon afterwards exchanged for that of Greek. His lectures were frequently interrupted by his ill-health and the religious disturbances of the time. His death is said to have been caused by his apprehension that he might share the fate of his friend Pierre de la Ramée, who had been killed in the massacre of St Bartholomew.

== Works ==
The 1913 Catholic Encyclopedia describes Lambin as "one of the greatest scholars of his age" and recommends his annotations of classical authors, while criticizing the vagueness of his citations to manuscripts. The encyclopedia describes him as conservative in his textual criticism, but mentions that others have found his emendations rash.

His chief editions are:

- Horace (1561)
- Lucretius (1563), on which see H. A. J. Munro's preface to his edition
- Cicero (1566)
- Cornelius Nepos (1569)
- Demosthenes (1570), completing the unfinished work of Guillaume Morel
- Plautus (1576)
