= Catillus =

Mythical son of Amphiaraus

There are two Catilli in Roman legend:

- Catillus the Arcadian, son of Amphiaraus.
- Catillus, his son.

Catillus the Arcadian and his sons Catillus, Coras, and Tiburtus escaped the mass killing at Thebes and arrived at the Aniene Plateau. They drove away the Sicilians who lived there and founded a city named Tibur (now Tivoli) in honor of Tiburtus.

In Book VII of Virgil's Aeneid, the twin brothers, Catillus and Coras, leave Tibur and head for Latium to fight against Aeneas and the Trojans as an ally of Turnus.

Horace (Odes 18.2) records the name as "Cātilus"; Virgil (Aeneid 7.672) and Silius Italicus as "Cātillus", and Statius as "Catillus". There was a mons Catilli in Tibur, presumably the modern Monte Catillo.
