= Bes (coin) =

The bes (pl.: bessis) was an Ancient Roman bronze coin produced during the Roman Republic. Valued at two thirds of an as (eight unciae), it was only produced in 126 BC by C. Cassius in combination with the dodrans, another very rare denomination which was valued at three quarters of an as (nine unciae). The obverse head displayed the god Liber facing to the right.

== See also ==
- Roman currency
- Ancient Greek coinage
