= Choriamb =

In Greek and Latin poetry, a choriamb /ˈkɔːriˌæmb/ (Ancient Greek: χορίαμβος - khoriambos) is a metron (prosodic foot) consisting of four syllables in the pattern long-short-short-long (— ^{‿ ‿} —), that is, a trochee alternating with an iamb. Choriambs are one of the two basic metra that do not occur in spoken verse, as distinguished from true lyric or sung verse. The choriamb is sometimes regarded as the "nucleus" of Aeolic verse, because the pattern long-short-short-long pattern occurs, but to label this a "choriamb" is potentially misleading.

In the prosody of English and other modern European languages, "choriamb" is sometimes used to describe a four-syllable sequence of the pattern stressed-unstressed-unstressed-stressed (again, a trochee followed by an iamb): for example, "over the hill", "under the bridge", and "what a mistake!".

== English prosody ==
In English, the choriamb is often found in the first four syllables of iambic pentameter verses, as here in Keats' To Autumn:

Who hath not seen thee oft amid thy store?
Sometimes whoever seeks abroad may find
Thee sitting careless on a granary floor,
Thy hair soft-lifted by the winnowing wind;
Or on a half-reap'd furrow sound asleep,
Drows'd with the fume of poppies, while thy hook
Spares the next swath and all its twined flowers:
And sometimes like a gleaner thou dost keep
Steady thy laden head across a brook;
Or by a cider-press, with patient look,
Thou watchest the last oozings hours by hours.

== See also ==
- Metre (poetry)
- Aeolic verse
