= Stichic =

Form of poetry

Poetry made up of lines of the same approximate meter and length, not broken up into stanzas, is called stichic (as opposed to stanzaic). Most poetry from the Old English period is considered stichic. Most English poetry written in blank verse, such as the epic Paradise Lost by John Milton, is stichic. A more contemporary (1790's) example is Joanna Baillie's "Hay making".

Greek epic, in dactylic hexameter, as is Latin epic whether in hexameter or (in very old poets) Saturnian. Poetic dramatic dialogue, whether in English iambic pentameter or Greek iambic trimeter, also tends to be stichic in nature.
