= Solymosi =

Solymosi is a Hungarian surname. It is the surname of:

- Balázs Solymosi, head of Wood Badge training in Hungary
- Ernő Solymosi (1940–2011), Hungarian footballer
- Eszter Solymosi, 19th century girl in Austria-Hungary whose death led to the Tiszaeszlár affair
- Gabor Solymosi, Hungarian competitor in the 2012 World Cup of Pool
- József Solymosi, Hungarian-Canadian mathematician
- Ottó Solymosi (1927–2024), director of Magyar Rádió
- Zoltán Solymosi (born 1967), Hungarian ballet dancer

== See also ==
- Avrămești, a commune in Romania one of whose villages has the Hungarian name Solymosi Láz
