= Ruby Jubilee of Elizabeth II =

40th anniversary of the accession of Queen Elizabeth II

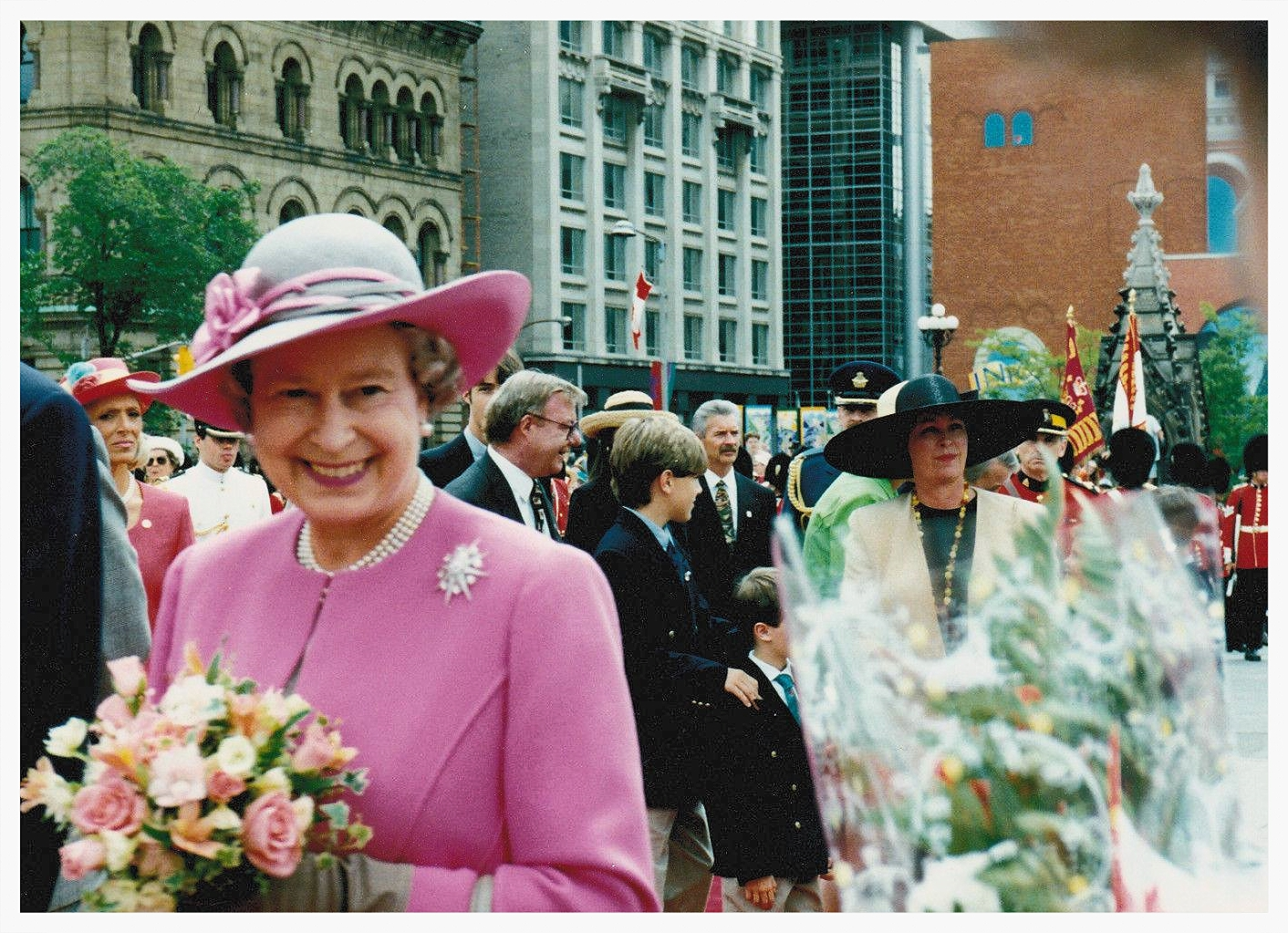
- The Queen in Ottawa in 1992 to celebrate her Ruby Jubilee and the 125th anniversary of Canadian Confederation
- Genre: Jubilee of the monarch of the United Kingdom and the other Commonwealth realms
- Date: 6 February 1992; 34 years ago
- Country: United Kingdom; Canada; Australia; New Zealand; Commonwealth of Nations
- Previous event: Silver Jubilee of Elizabeth II
- Next event: Golden Jubilee of Elizabeth II

The Ruby Jubilee of Elizabeth II in 1992 marked the 40th anniversary of the accession of Queen Elizabeth II on 6 February 1952. Contrary to her Silver Jubilee in 1977, it was not regarded as an "official" jubilee. However, the milestone was marked with a number of events and community projects.

The term "Ruby Jubilee" was not officially, nor indeed more generally, used in 1992; rather the occasion was referred to as the "40th Anniversary of the Queen's Accession".

== Commemorations ==
=== United Kingdom ===
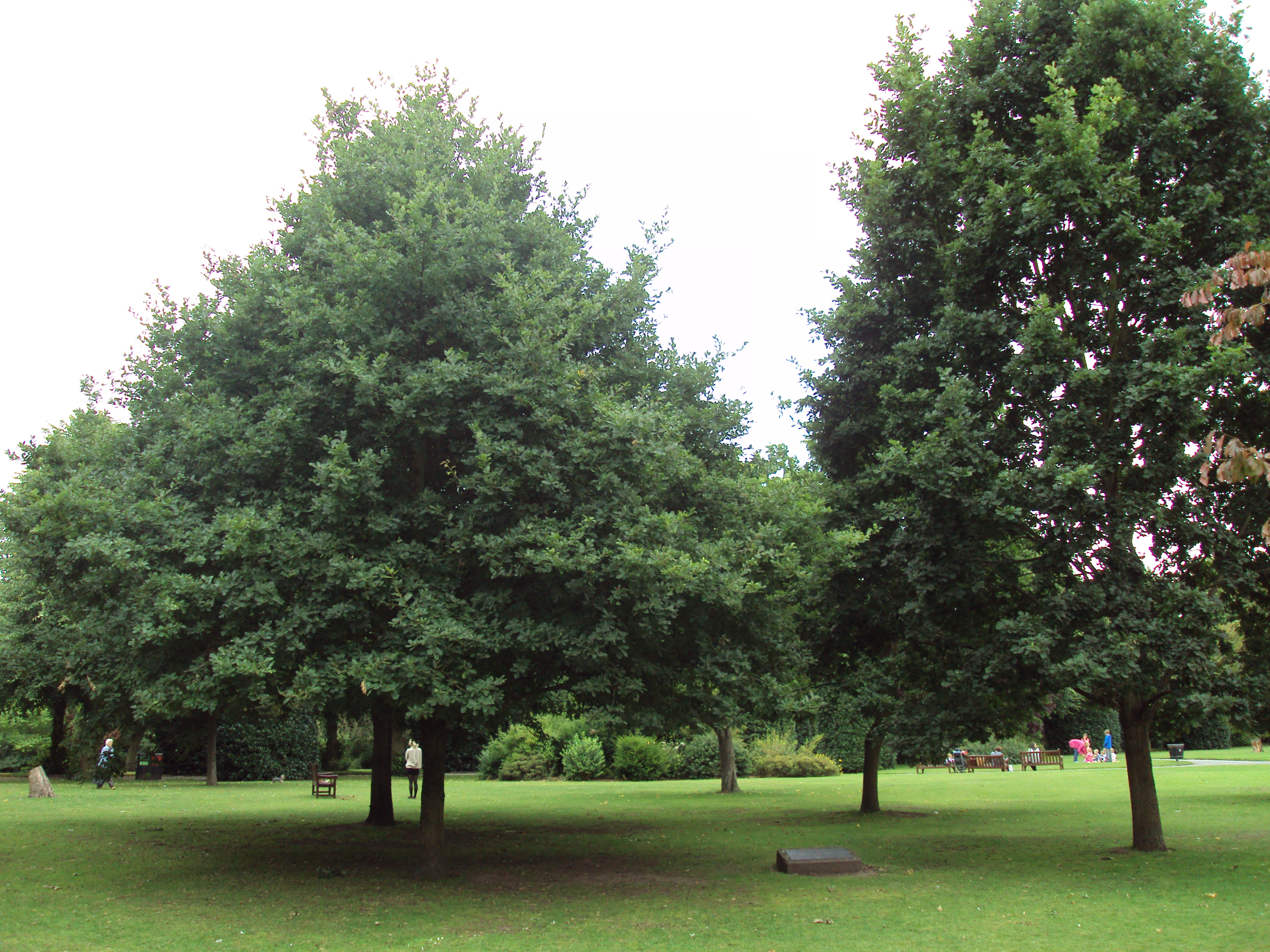
Four oak trees planted to commemorate the 40th anniversary of the Queen's accession to the throne, at Grosvenor Park, Chester

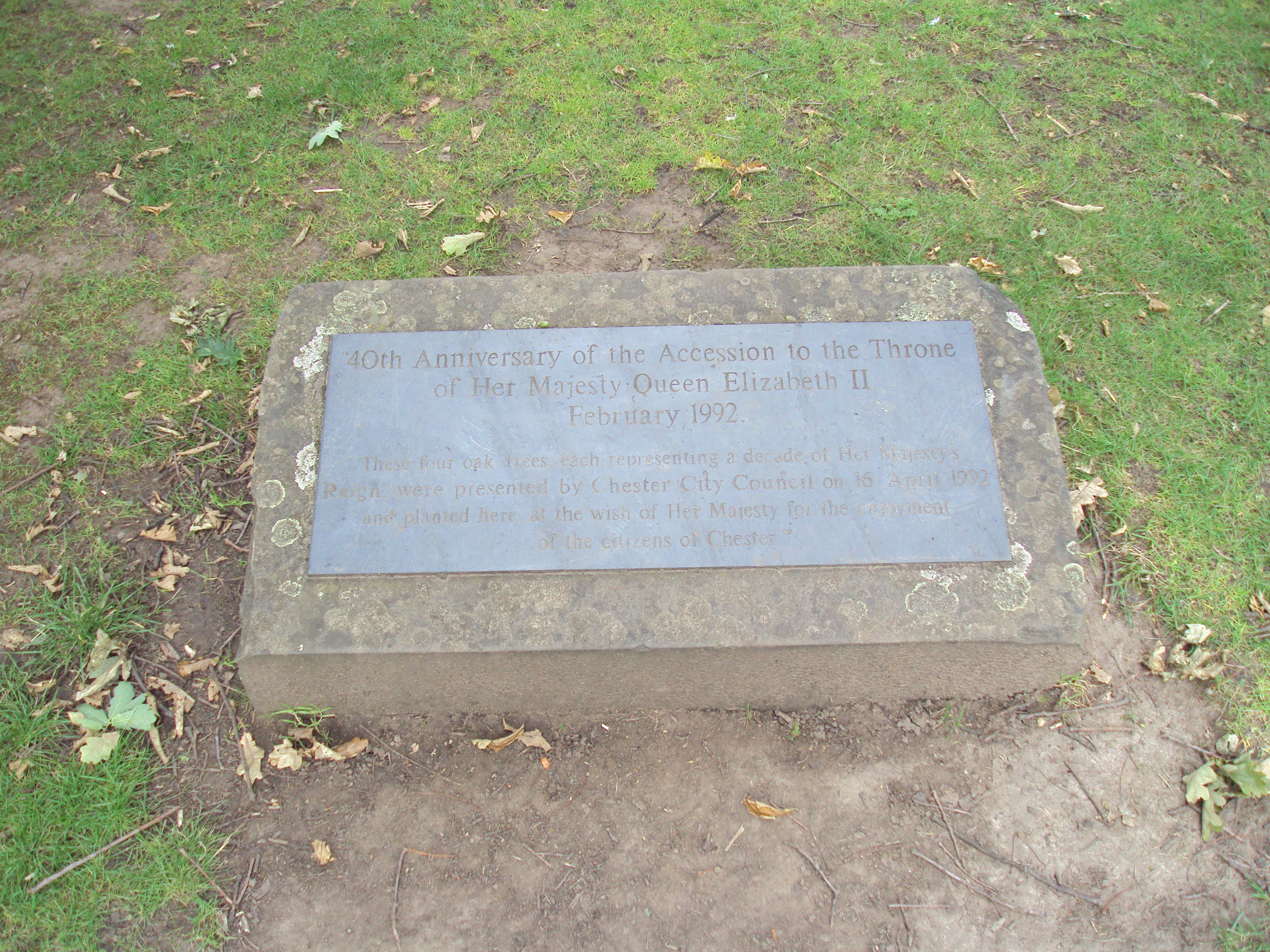
A plaque next to the commemorative oak trees commemorating the Queen's Ruby Jubilee

The Royal Anniversary Trust was established in 1990 to create a national programme of educational activities and other events marking the 40th anniversary of the Queen's Accession to the throne.

On Accession Day 1992, Prime Minister John Major and Leader of the Opposition Neil Kinnock in the House of Commons gave statements of congratulations to her for reaching the milestone. On the same day, Queen Elizabeth II, wearing a purple outfit and a diamond and amethyst brooch, set out on a walkabout in the village of Snettisham near Sandringham, Norfolk, to mark the 40th anniversary of her accession to the throne. She was greeted by members of the public and they presented bouquets to the Queen.

A gala was held at the Royal Opera House on 10 February 1992 to mark the 40th anniversary of the Queen's accession. It was attended by the Queen and included a performance of Mozart's Don Giovanni.

On 14 February, it was announced that the Queen had agreed to confer city status upon Sunderland as part of celebrations to mark the 40th anniversary of her reign.

Ted Hughes composed a poem, "The Unicorn", for the Jubilee.

On 8 July 1992, a tribute was held at the Fountain Court of Hampton Court Palace to celebrate the 40th Anniversary of the Queen's Accession. It was attended by the Queen and Prince Philip. The tribute started after a girl presented a bouquet of red roses to the Queen. It included performances by children from all over the world to represent the Commonwealth. The Youth Ballet performed the 'Royal Kitchen Mice Polka'.

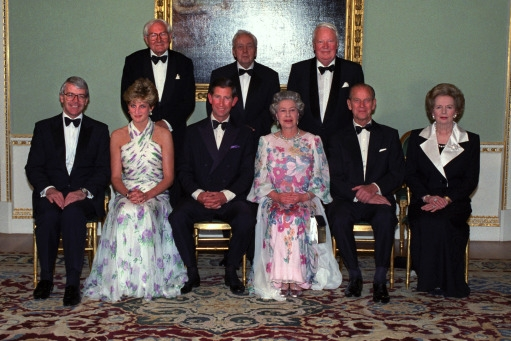
At Spencer House lunch hosted by prime ministers

A banquet was hosted at Spencer House by Prime Minister John Major and former Prime Ministers Harold Wilson, Edward Heath, James Callaghan and Margaret Thatcher on 27 July 1992 to celebrate the 40th anniversary of the Queen's accession. The royal party that attended the banquet were the Queen, Prince Philip, Duke of Edinburgh, and the Prince and Princess of Wales.

==== The Great Event ====
A grand gala celebration of forty years of the Queen's reign, entitled The Great Event, was held at London's Earl's Court on 26 October 1992. It was organized by the Royal Anniversary Trust and televised throughout the world. The gala was attended by more than 1,700 people, including the Queen, the Duke of Edinburgh; Charles and Diana, the Prince and Princess of Wales; Prince Andrew, Duke of York, Prince Edward, Princess Margaret, Katharine, Duchess of Kent, Princess Michael of Kent, Prime Minister John Major, the leader of the opposition Labour Party, John Smith, the Secretary-General of the Commonwealth Chief Emeka Anyaoku, and the Archbishop of Canterbury, George Carey. The programme included performances by Dame Vera Lynn, the Pearly Kings and Queens, the Sixties Tiller Girls, pop singer Cliff Richard and Lonnie Donegan. Darcey Bussell and Zoltán Solymosi, members of the Royal Ballet performed the pas de deux from Act II of Swan Lake. More than 500 children, who represented the nations of the Commonwealth, took part during the grand finale. They wore their indigenous dresses and arranged on the stage to form a map of the world.

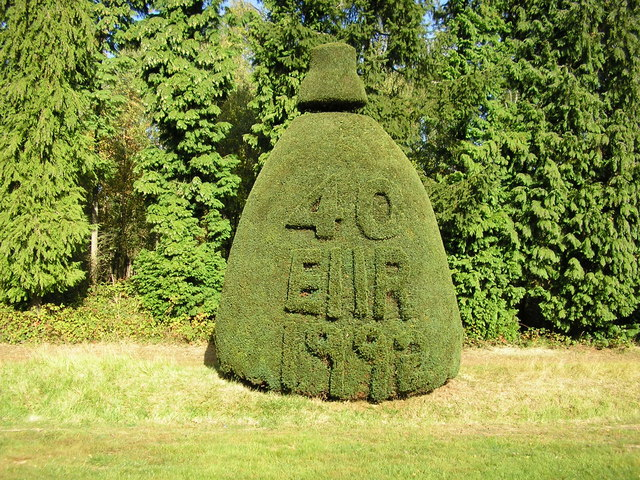
A Yew clipped at Yew Tree Avenue, Clipsham, Rutland to commemorate the 40th anniversary of the Queen's accession in 1992

==== Elizabeth R: A Year in the Life of the Queen ====
A documentary film, named Elizabeth R: A Year in the Life of the Queen was made by the BBC to mark the 40th anniversary of the Queen's accession. The Royal family watched and approved of the documentary before it was broadcast on television. The film aired on 6 February 1992, the 40th Accession Day of the Queen, and it was also broadcast in more than 25 countries around the world. It gained the largest audience for a documentary in the history of British television and was watched by more than half of the British population in 1992.

==== Guildhall Jubilee Lunch ====
On 24 November 1992, a luncheon was held at the Guildhall, London to honour the 40th anniversary of the Queen's Accession. The event was organised by the City of London Corporation and attended by more than 500 people including the Queen, Prince Philip, Duke of Edinburgh, The Lord Mayor and Lady Mayoress of London, and Prime Minister John Major and his wife Norma Major. Donning a dark green dress and matching hat, the Queen delivered a 'historic' speech, in which she described the year 1992 as her annus horribilis (a Latin phrase meaning 'horrible year'). In that year, three of her children's marriages crumbled; a fire destroyed more than a hundred rooms in Windsor Castle; a toe-sucking scandal involving Sarah, Duchess of York, and the publication of Andrew Morton's controversial book about Diana, Princess of Wales called Diana: Her True Story caused a stir in Britain and the monarchy. As a result, the public opinion turned against the Royal family, and due to this, the jubilee celebrations were toned down.

=== Canada ===
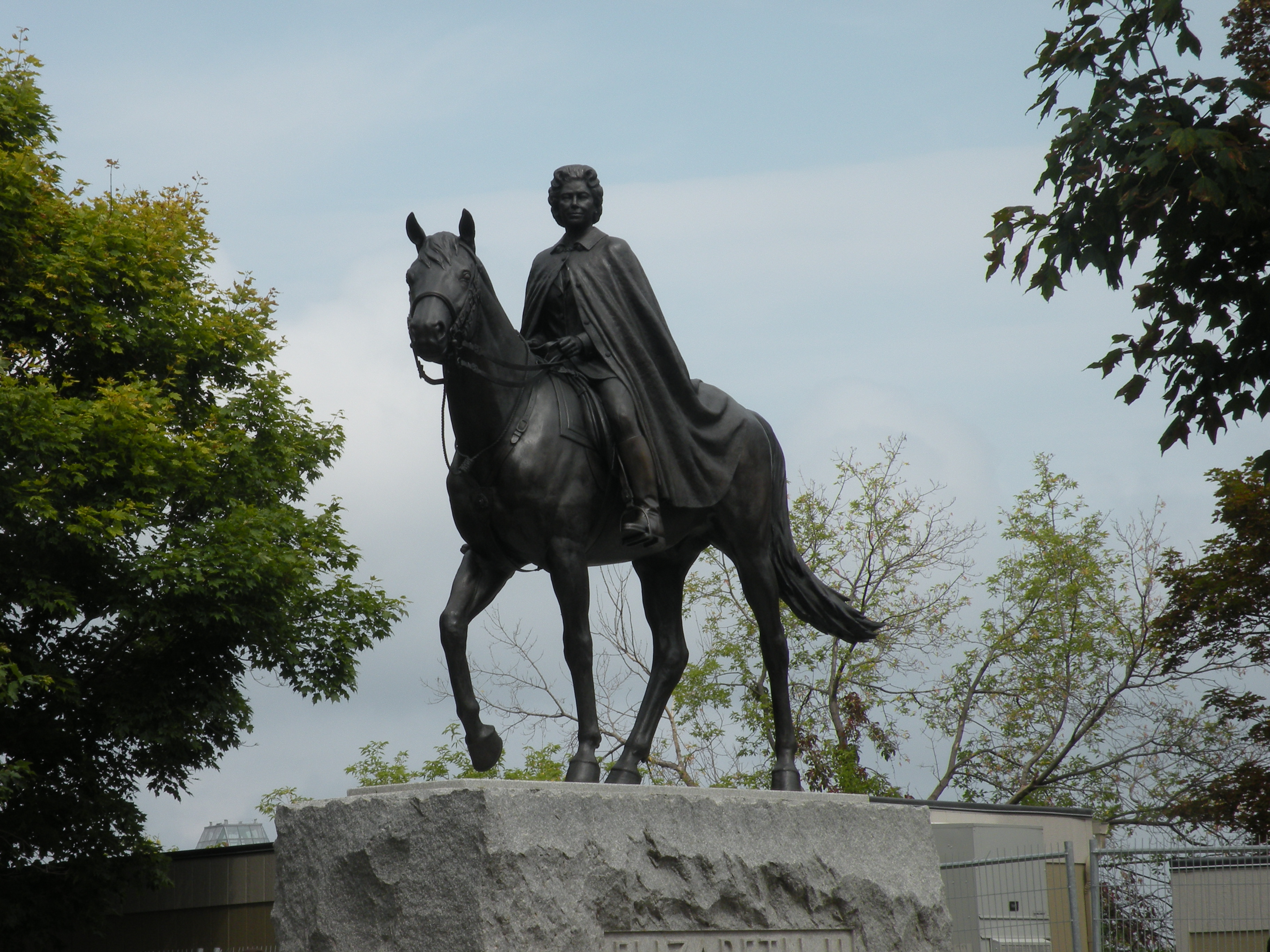
Sculpture of Queen Elizabeth II at Parliament Hill unveiled in 1992 in honour of the Queen's Ruby Jubilee and the 125th anniversary of the Canadian Confederation

An equestrian statue of the Queen was commissioned in 1990 in order to commemorate the Ruby Jubilee and the 125th anniversary of Confederation in 1992. The statue was unveiled on 30 June 1992 during the Queen's 1992 Royal tour of Canada, which took place until 3 July. The statue was unveiled on the grounds of Parliament Hill, situated across a statue of Queen Victoria, the first monarch of a confederated Canada.

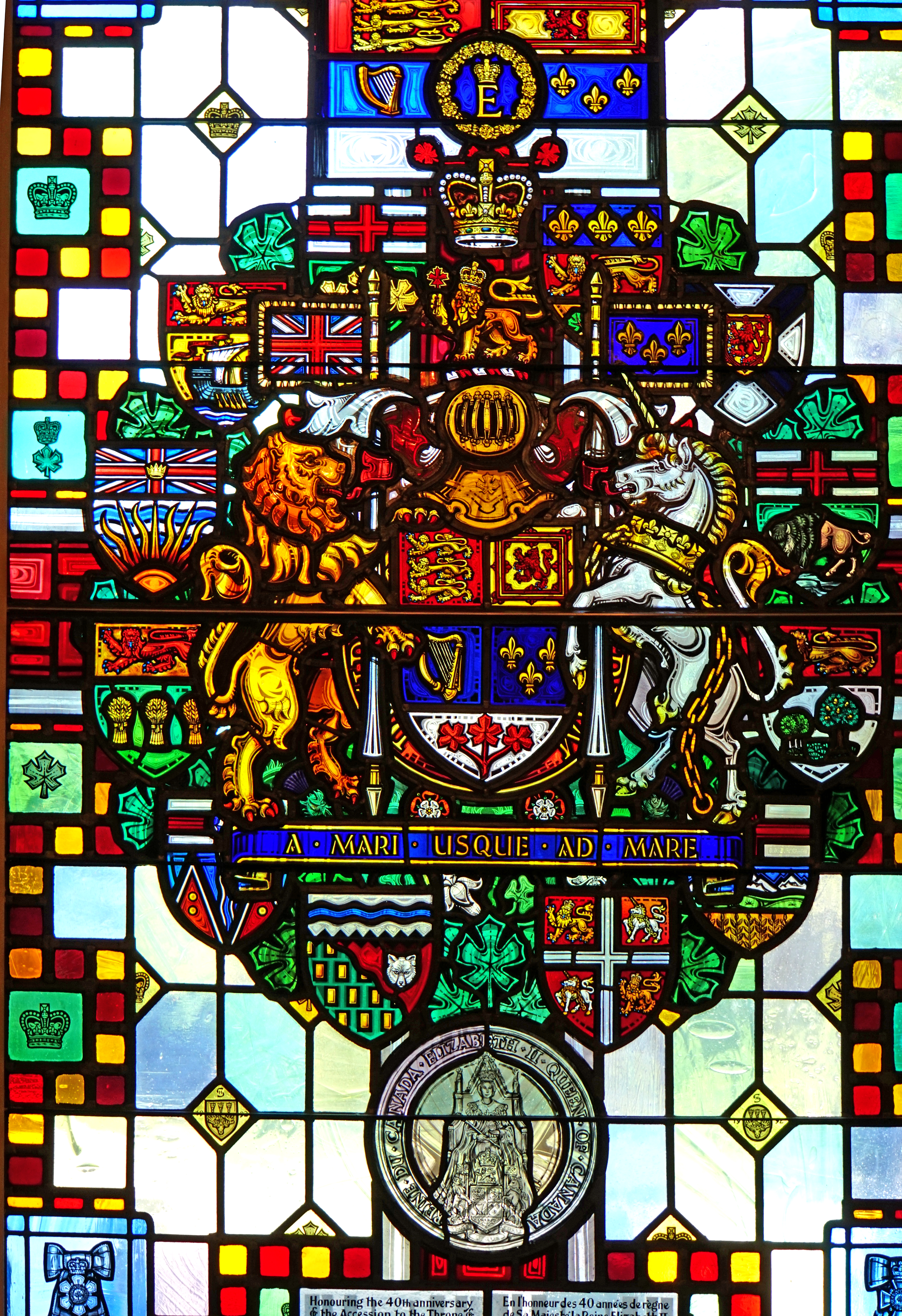
The Royal Window in the foyer of Rideau Hall, commemorating the Queen's Ruby Jubilee. At centre is the Royal Coat of Arms of Canada surrounded by the shields of each of the sovereign's 10 provincial and then-two territorial coats of arms.

The Queen undertook the royal tour in order to preside over several commemorations relating to the 125th anniversary of Canadian Confederation and her Ruby Jubilee. On the same day she unveiled her equestrian statue, the Queen also unveiled two stained-glass windows at Rideau Hall, one to commemorate her Ruby Jubilee, the other to commemorate the 40th anniversary of the appointment of the first Canadian-born governor general of Canada, and the 25th year of the Canadian Honours System. She also presented new colours to her regiment, the Canadian Grenadier Guards. The following day, she presided over the swearing in of new members for the Queen's Privy Council of Canada, before presiding over official Canada Day celebrations on Parliament Hill.

During the year, the Parliament of Canada also passed a motion of congratulations to the Queen for reaching the milestone.

=== Australia ===
The Queen and Prince Philip, Duke of Edinburgh undertook a royal tour of Australia in February 1992 in order to officiate at celebrations marking the 150th anniversary of Sydney City's Council, during her 40th year as monarch. The Queen officially opened refurbishments to the Sydney Town Hall and also the Paddock Stand at Sydney's Royal Randwick Racecourse, headquarters of the Australian Jockey Club, which also celebrated its 150th anniversary. It was also on this occasion that the Queen certified Randwick as 'Royal'.

The Prime Minister of Australia, Paul Keating, also congratulated the Queen for reaching the 40th anniversary of her accession to the throne. It was also on this occasion, that Prime Minister Keating broke royal protocol by placing his hand on the Queen's back, causing outraged British tabloid newspapers to dub him the 'Lizard of Oz'.

=== New Zealand ===
On 3 March 1992, during the second session of the 43rd New Zealand Parliament, a motion moved by the Prime Minister of New Zealand Jim Bolger, in which the House offered their "warm and sincere" congratulations to the Queen of New Zealand on her Ruby Jubilee. Prime Minister Bolger said, "For 40 years the Queen has led the Commonwealth as a symbol of unity and a rallying point for the constitutional values that form the basis of our political system". He added, "A life of utmost decorum, a record of outstanding public service, and 40 years of political experience at the highest level are all attributes that deserve our affection, respect, and constitutional loyalty".

The Speaker Robin Gray said that the anniversary of the Queen's accession coincides with Waitangi Day, which "creates a unique bond" between the Crown and the people of New Zealand.

The motion was supported by the Opposition and was passed by the House. The House also extended its appreciation to the Duke of Edinburgh and other members of the Royal Family who supported Elizabeth II as Queen of New Zealand and as Head of the Commonwealth.

== Memorabilia ==
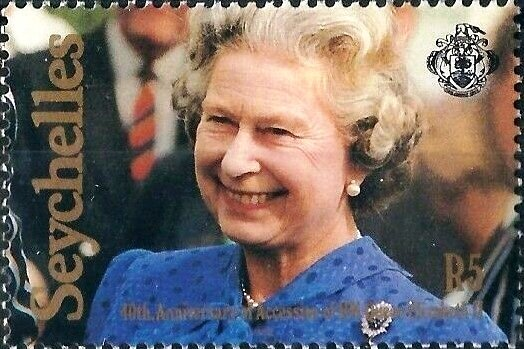
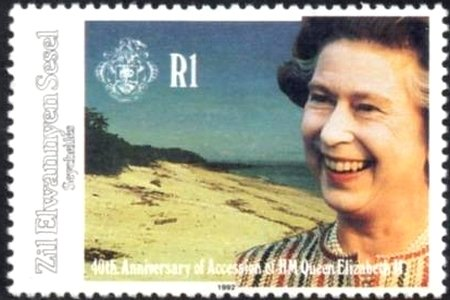
Stamps released by Seychelles to mark the Queen's forty years on the throne

Different stamps and coins marking the Jubilee were released by the United Kingdom (including its Crown dependencies and Overseas territories), Commonwealth realms and some former realms of the Queen.

=== The Commonwealth Mace ===
During The Great Event at London's Earl's Court, the Queen was presented with a special Commonwealth Mace, which was proposed by the Royal Anniversary Trust and approved by the Commonwealth Heads of Government at the Harare Commonwealth Heads of Government Meeting 1991 to mark the 40th anniversary of the Queen's accession to the throne. The Queen also received fifty-two silver gilt toasting goblets, one for each of the then members of the Commonwealth. The mace itself was designed by the London-based goldsmith Gerald Benney. The Commonwealth Mace contains five kilograms of 18 carat gold, rubies, and is illustrated with the Royal Coat of Arms, the Commonwealth Symbol, and the emamelled flags of the member states of the Commonwealth. Geoffrey Munn, an antiques expert, described it as a "most marvellous tribute to Her Majesty’s reign and a lovely thing to see".

=== The Royal Ladies Coin and Medallion set ===
The Royal Australian Mint issued a special commemorative coin set, both in gold and in silver, to mark the Queen's Ruby Jubilee. Titled 'The Royal Ladies', the set consists of four proof twenty-five dollar coins commemorating the 40th anniversary of the accession of Queen Elizabeth II. The reverses portray Queen Elizabeth the Queen Mother, the Princess of Wales, the Princess Royal and Princess Margaret, Countess of Snowdon. The set also includes a medallion.

== See also ==
- Silver Jubilee of Elizabeth II
- Golden Jubilee of Elizabeth II
- Diamond Jubilee of Elizabeth II
- Sapphire Jubilee of Elizabeth II
- Platinum Jubilee of Elizabeth II
- List of monarchs in Britain by length of reign
- List of jubilees of British monarchs
