= Golden Jubilee National Service of Thanksgiving =

Golden Jubilee National Service of Thanksgiving may refer to:

- The service of thanksgiving held at St Paul's Cathedral to mark the Golden Jubilee of George III in 1809
- The service of thanksgiving held at Westminster Abbey to mark the Golden Jubilee of Queen Victoria in 1887
- The service of thanksgiving held at St Paul's Cathedral to mark the Golden Jubilee of Elizabeth II in 2002
