= Royal Jubilee Commemorative Medals =

Royal Jubilee Commemorative Medals may refer to:

- medals issued for British royal jubilees. For a list, see List of jubilees of British monarchs.
- medals issued for Danish royal jubilees. For a list, see Orders, decorations, and medals of Denmark.
- medals issued for Swedish royal jubilees. For a list, see Swedish Royal Jubilee Commemorative Medals.
- medals issued for Norwegian royal jubilees. For a list, see Orders, decorations, and medals of Norway.
