= Sapphire Jubilee of Elizabeth II =

65th anniversary of the monarch's accession

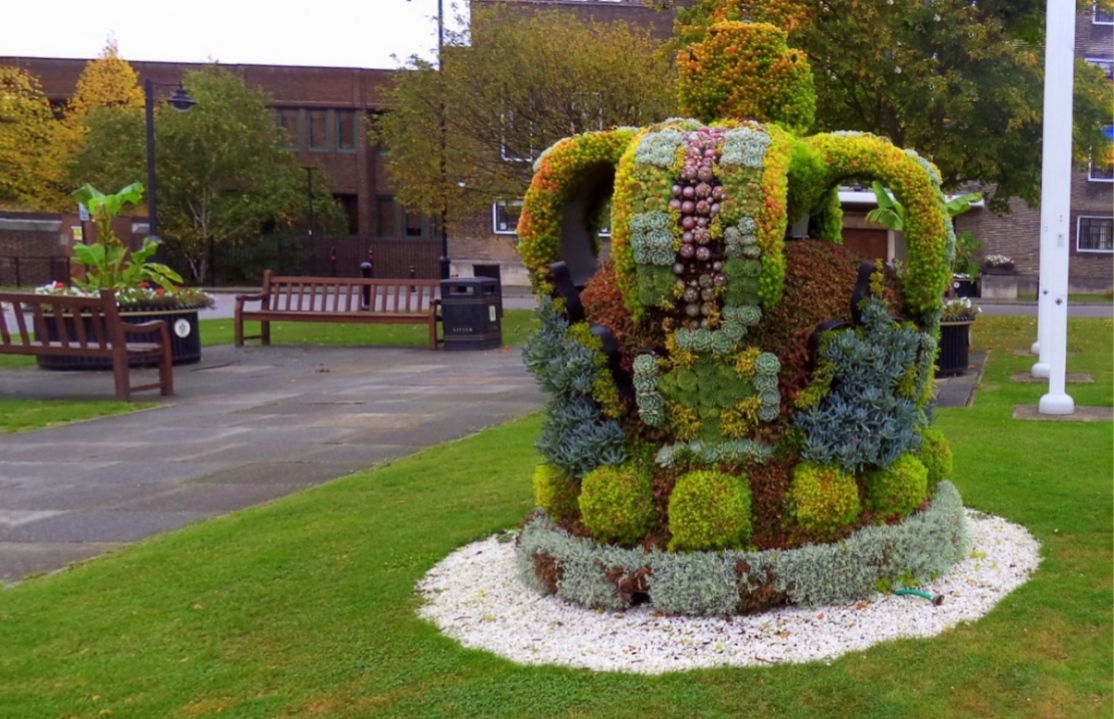
- A crown-shaped topiary created to commemorate the Sapphire Jubilee at Havering Town Hall, Romford
- Genre: Jubilee of the monarch of the United Kingdom and the other Commonwealth realms
- Date: 6 February 2017; 9 years ago
- Country: United Kingdom; Canada; Australia; New Zealand; Commonwealth of Nations
- Previous event: Diamond Jubilee of Elizabeth II
- Next event: Platinum Jubilee of Elizabeth II

The Sapphire Jubilee of Elizabeth II on 6 February 2017, marked 65 years of Queen Elizabeth II's reign. The longest-reigning monarch in British history, Elizabeth II was the first British monarch to have a sapphire jubilee.

Unlike her Silver, Golden, and Diamond Jubilees, there were no widespread public celebrations of the Queen's Sapphire Jubilee. Instead, like the February 1992 Ruby Jubilee, the Queen did not undertake any official engagements. As then, she spent the day in "quiet reflection" on the anniversary of the death of her father, George VI, and undertook official work at Sandringham House. She attended a service at St Peter and St Paul Church in West Newton, Norfolk, on Sunday 5 February, where she was greeted by crowds of well-wishers. Larger-scale celebrations took place in June 2016, to mark the Queen's 90th birthday, and any extensive celebrations were reserved for a possible Platinum Jubilee in 2022. Despite proposals for larger celebrations to mark the 65th anniversary of the Queen's accession in June 2017, including a mooted bank holiday, no such celebrations were held.

== Commemoration ==
The Commonwealth Secretary-General, Baroness Scotland of Asthal, congratulated the Queen for reaching the Sapphire Jubilee as Head of the Commonwealth and said that she has "been an inspirational monarch. It's clear how much she values the Commonwealth, how dear the Commonwealth family is to her heart, and in return how much the people of our 52 member states value and love her. ... Her wisdom, advice and wonderful support have been invaluable to me since I was elected to office in April 2016".

=== Australia ===
On 8 February, in the House of Representatives, Prime Minister Malcolm Turnbull delivered a statement in which he congratulated the Queen on her Sapphire Jubilee, and said "She is so revered and respected here that few of us can say that we are not Elizabethans". The Leader of the Opposition, Bill Shorten, said "Even staunch republicans cannot help but admire the dedication to public duty that the Queen has shown, the life of service that she has led".

In the Senate, a motion was introduced by the Senator for Western Australia, Dean Smith, in which the Senate extended to the Queen "its continuing appreciation for the gracious manner in which she continues to fulfil her duties as Queen of Australia".

=== Canada ===
On Accession Day, Justin Trudeau, the prime minister of Canada, congratulated the queen in a tweet:

"Today marks the Queen's 65th anniversary on the throne – her #SapphireJubilee. Warmest congratulations & best wishes on behalf of Canadians."

The governor general of Canada, David Johnston, congratulated the queen on her Sapphire Jubilee, and said "This impressive milestone, the first for any sovereign in our history, provides us with an opportunity to express our deepest gratitude for everything Her Majesty has done for the Canadian Crown".

In the House of Commons of Canada, Randy Boissonnault, the member for Edmonton Centre, said, "As we reflect on our history throughout Canada's 150th birthday, we also mark and honour the story of our amazing monarch. God save the Queen".

During the year, a grove of 65 maple trees was planted in Rockcliffe Park in Ottawa, to mark the Queen's Sapphire Jubilee. Other activities were hosted by lieutenant governors across the provinces, during the Jubilee year.

On Canada Day, the Prince of Wales and the Duchess of Cornwall inaugurated Rideau Hall's new doors, as "The Queen's Entrance", in celebration of the Queen's Sapphire Jubilee.

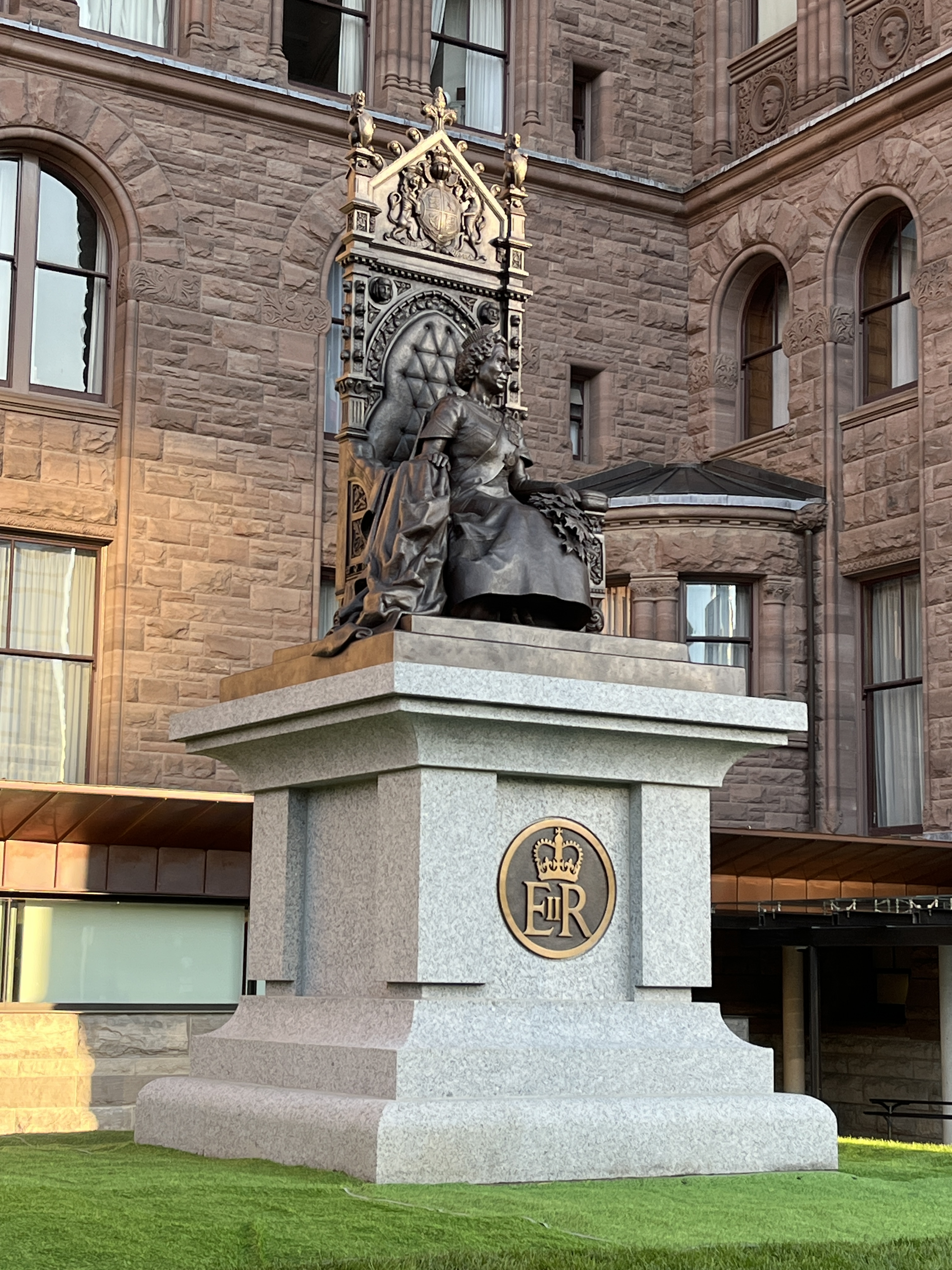
A statue of Elizabeth II in Queen's Park in Toronto. Commissioned for the Sapphire Jubilee, the completion of the statue was delayed to 2023.

A statue of Elizabeth II was commissioned in 2017 to mark the Sapphire Jubilee and the 150th anniversary of Canadian Confederation. However, its installation at Queen's Park was delayed until 2023 due to financing issues.

==== Sapphire Jubilee Snowflake Brooch ====
At a celebration of Canada's sesquicentennial at Canada House on 19 July 2017, the Governor General of Canada David Johnston presented the Sapphire Jubilee Snowflake Brooch to the Queen as a gift from the Government of Canada to celebrate the Queen's Sapphire Jubilee and to commemorate Canada 150. David Johnston presented the Queen with the brooch moments before she and the Duke of Edinburgh unveiled a new Jubilee Walkway panel outside Canada House. The brooch was designed as a companion to the Diamond Maple Leaf brooch. The piece was made by Hillberg & Berk of Saskatchewan and consists of sapphires from a cache found in 2002 on Baffin Island by brothers Seemeega and Nowdluk Aqpik.

=== New Zealand ===
A motion was introduced in the New Zealand Parliament, by Winston Peters, Leader of New Zealand First, in respect of the Sapphire Jubilee of the Queen and was passed by the House. In the motion, the House congratulated the Queen of New Zealand on becoming the first monarch of New Zealand to reach a sapphire jubilee, marking 65 years on the throne.

=== United Kingdom ===
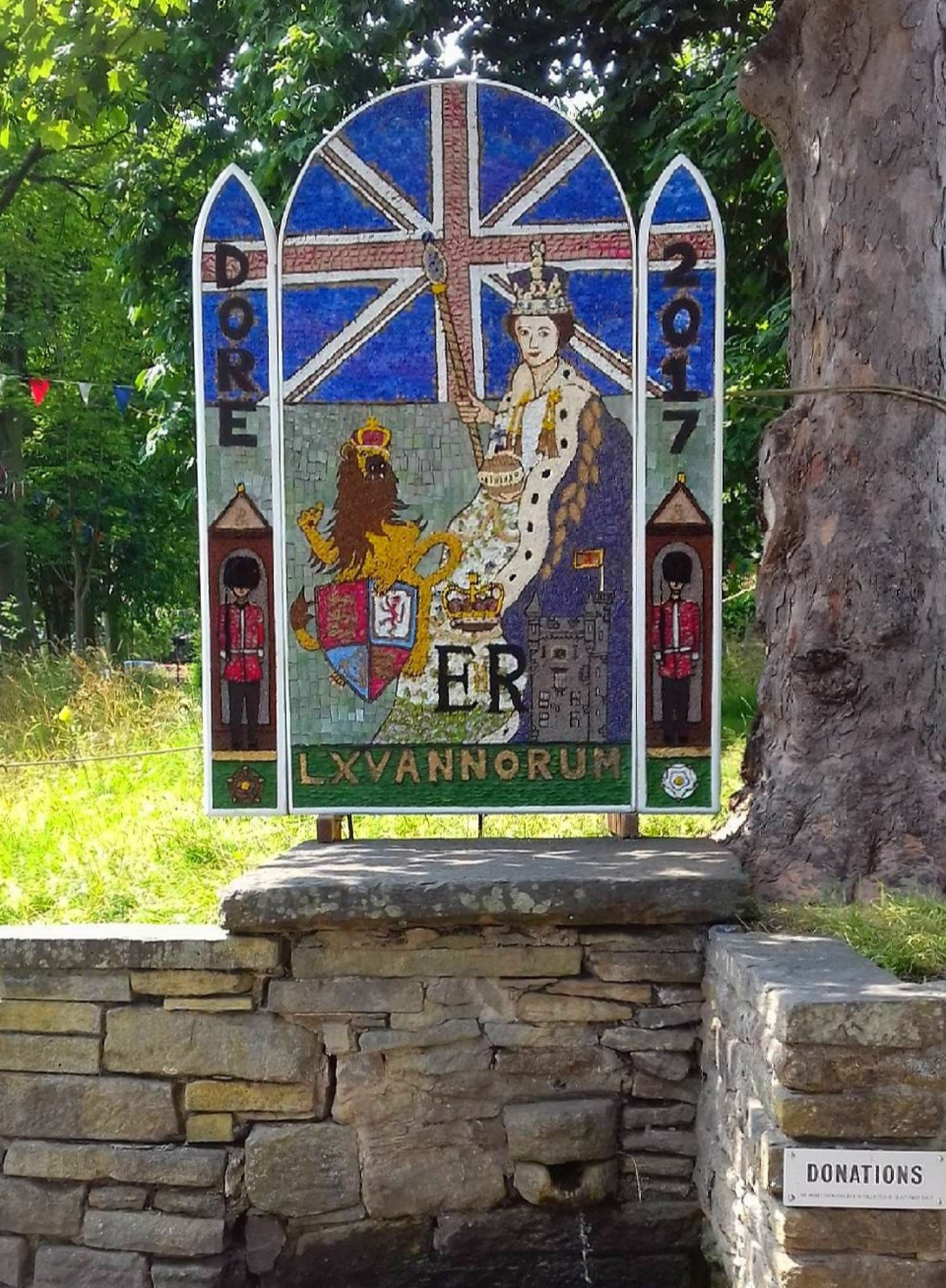
A well dressing at Dore, South Yorkshire commemorating the Sapphire Jubilee of the Queen

The Sapphire Jubilee featured blue stamps from the Royal Mail, commemorative coins from the Royal Mint, including one worth £50,000, and a reissue of an official 2014 portrait of Queen Elizabeth II by David Bailey. In this official portrait, the Queen wears sapphire jewellery which she received as a wedding present from her father.

The Jubilee also involved the ringing of the bells in Westminster Abbey, a 41-gun salute by the King's Troop, Royal Horse Artillery in Green Park, a 62-gun salute by the Honourable Artillery Company at the Tower of London and gun salutes in several other places around the United Kingdom.

Theresa May, the prime minister of the United Kingdom, congratulated the queen, saying in part that the occasion was "another remarkable milestone for our remarkable Queen. ... I know the nation will join with me today in celebrating and giving thanks for the lifetime of service Her Majesty the Queen has given to our country and to the Commonwealth. ... She has truly been an inspiration to all of us and I am proud, on behalf of the nation, to offer our humble thanks and congratulations on celebrating this Sapphire Jubilee".

==== Other tributes ====
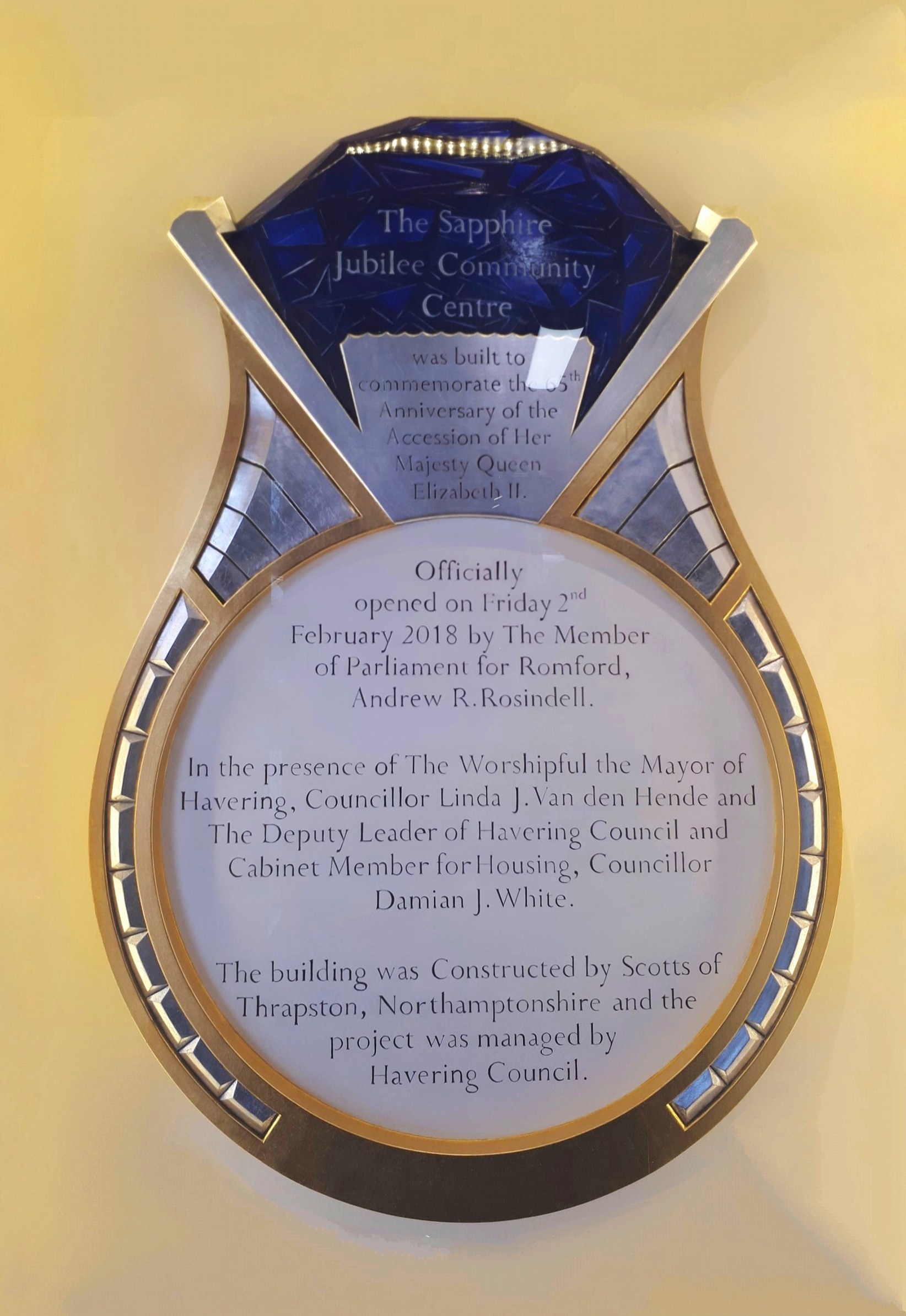
A sapphire ring-shaped plaque installed at the Sapphire Jubilee Community Centre, Romford

In September 2017, a new community centre in Collier Row, Romford, was named the Sapphire Jubilee Community Centre in the Queen's honour.

To mark the Queen's Sapphire Jubilee, Welwyn Hatfield Borough Council instituted "The Queen's Sapphire Jubilee Awards", which are awarded to young people aged between 7 and 20 years, to support them to get started, improve and excel in sport, art, dance or drama. The awards are presented to successful candidates at the Annual Council.

Penhaligon's released a limited-edition version of their Lily of the Valley perfume, to commemorate the Queen's Sapphire Jubilee. Only 65 crystal bottles were produced – one to mark each year since the Queen's accession to the throne in 1952 and the bows on every single bottle were embroidered with a number. It was announced that a percentage of the profits from this product would go towards the Queen Elizabeth Scholarship Trust.

The British Pobjoy Mint released special Titanium coins featuring the Royal coat of arms to mark the Queen's Sapphire Jubilee. The obverse features a portrait of Queen Elizabeth II. Titanium reacts differently with every strike, making each coin unique in terms of colour. The coins also feature a lined effect due to its composition.

The Sapphire Ice & Leisure Centre at Romford, England, named to honour the Sapphire Jubilee of Queen Elizabeth II, opened to the public on 3 February 2018. The building is five storeys high and includes an eight-lane pool for competitions and a 56m by 26m ice rink, and is home for the ice hockey team, the London Raiders. From an external viewpoint, the combination of the building's rectangular shape and its lightweight facade were used to mimic the appearance of an ice cube.

In 2018, Garrard & Co unveiled a 118.88ct royal blue Burmese sapphire presented in a brooch that features a signature cluster setting. The jewel was named in honour of the 65th anniversary of Queen Elizabeth II's coronation, a date traditionally marked by the gift of a sapphire, and pays tribute to the House's role in remodelling the Imperial State Crown for the occasion.

=== Guernsey ===
In Guernsey, commemorative coins were issued to mark the Queen's Sapphire Jubilee.

== See also ==
- Silver Jubilee of Elizabeth II
- Ruby Jubilee of Elizabeth II
- Golden Jubilee of Elizabeth II
- Diamond Jubilee of Elizabeth II
- Platinum Jubilee of Elizabeth II
- List of monarchs in Britain by length of reign
- List of jubilees of British monarchs
