= List of jubilees of British monarchs =

The formal jubilees of British monarchs started with George III. At the start of the 50th year of his reign, his jubilee was celebrated throughout the British Isles and his colonial possessions. Later monarchs added other jubilee years.

== George III ==
Year	Jubilee	Notes	Medal(s)
1809	Golden Jubilee of George III	The first British monarch to mark a jubilee in a significant way was King George III. The Golden Jubilee of George III on 25 October 1809 marked the forty-ninth anniversary of his accession and his entrance into the 50th year of his reign.	King George III Jubilee Medal King George III and Queen Charlotte Jubilee Medal

== Victoria ==
Year	Jubilee	Notes	Medal(s)
1887	Golden Jubilee of Queen Victoria	The Golden Jubilee of Queen Victoria was celebrated on 20 June 1887 on the occasion of the 50th anniversary of Queen Victoria's accession on 20 June 1837.	Queen Victoria Golden Jubilee Medal Police Golden Jubilee Medal
1897	Diamond Jubilee of Queen Victoria	The Diamond Jubilee of Queen Victoria began on Sunday, 20 June 1897, the 60th anniversary of her accession to the throne. Celebrations to honour the grand occasion — the first Diamond Jubilee of any British monarch — showcased the Queen's role as 'mother' of the British Empire and its Dominions.	Queen Victoria Diamond Jubilee Medal Police Diamond Jubilee Medal Diamond Jubilee Mayors and Provosts Medal

== George V ==
Year	Jubilee	Notes	Medal(s)
1935	Silver Jubilee of George V	The Silver Jubilee of George V was celebrated on 6 May 1935 to mark 25 years of King George V as the King of the United Kingdom and the British Dominions, and Emperor of India. It was the first ever Silver Jubilee celebration of any British monarch in history.	King George V Silver Jubilee Medal

== Elizabeth II ==
The first Jubilee-like celebration for Queen Elizabeth II was in 1962, as it marked her 10th anniversary on the throne. The Royal Mint also released a number of sovereigns, bearing the ‘Young Head’ portrait of The Queen by Mary Gillick in 1962, to mark the milestone.

Queen Elizabeth II's jubilees are listed below:

Year	Jubilee	Notes	Medal(s)
1977	Silver Jubilee of Elizabeth II	The Silver Jubilee of Elizabeth II in 1977 marked the 25th anniversary of her accession to the throne and other Commonwealth realms.	Queen Elizabeth II Silver Jubilee Medal
1992	Ruby Jubilee of Elizabeth II	The Ruby Jubilee of Elizabeth II in 1992 marked the 40th anniversary of her accession to the throne and other Commonwealth realms. Contrary to her Silver Jubilee in 1977, the Ruby Jubilee was a low-profile event.	None
2002	Golden Jubilee of Elizabeth II	The Golden Jubilee of Elizabeth II was held in 2002 marking the 50th anniversary of her accession. Despite the deaths of her sister, Princess Margaret, and mother, Queen Elizabeth The Queen Mother, in February and March 2002 respectively, the jubilee was marked with large-scale and popular events throughout London and the Commonwealth realms.	Queen Elizabeth II Golden Jubilee Medal
2012	Diamond Jubilee of Elizabeth II	The Diamond Jubilee of Elizabeth II marked the 60th anniversary of the accession.	Queen Elizabeth II Diamond Jubilee Medal
2017	Sapphire Jubilee of Elizabeth II	The Sapphire Jubilee of Elizabeth II on 6 February 2017, marked 65 years of her reign. She was the first British monarch to have a Sapphire Jubilee.	None
2022	Platinum Jubilee of Elizabeth II	The Platinum Jubilee of Elizabeth II was celebrated in 2022 to mark the 70th anniversary of her accession. This was the first time any British monarch had celebrated a Platinum Jubilee.	Queen Elizabeth II Platinum Jubilee Medal

== Gallery ==
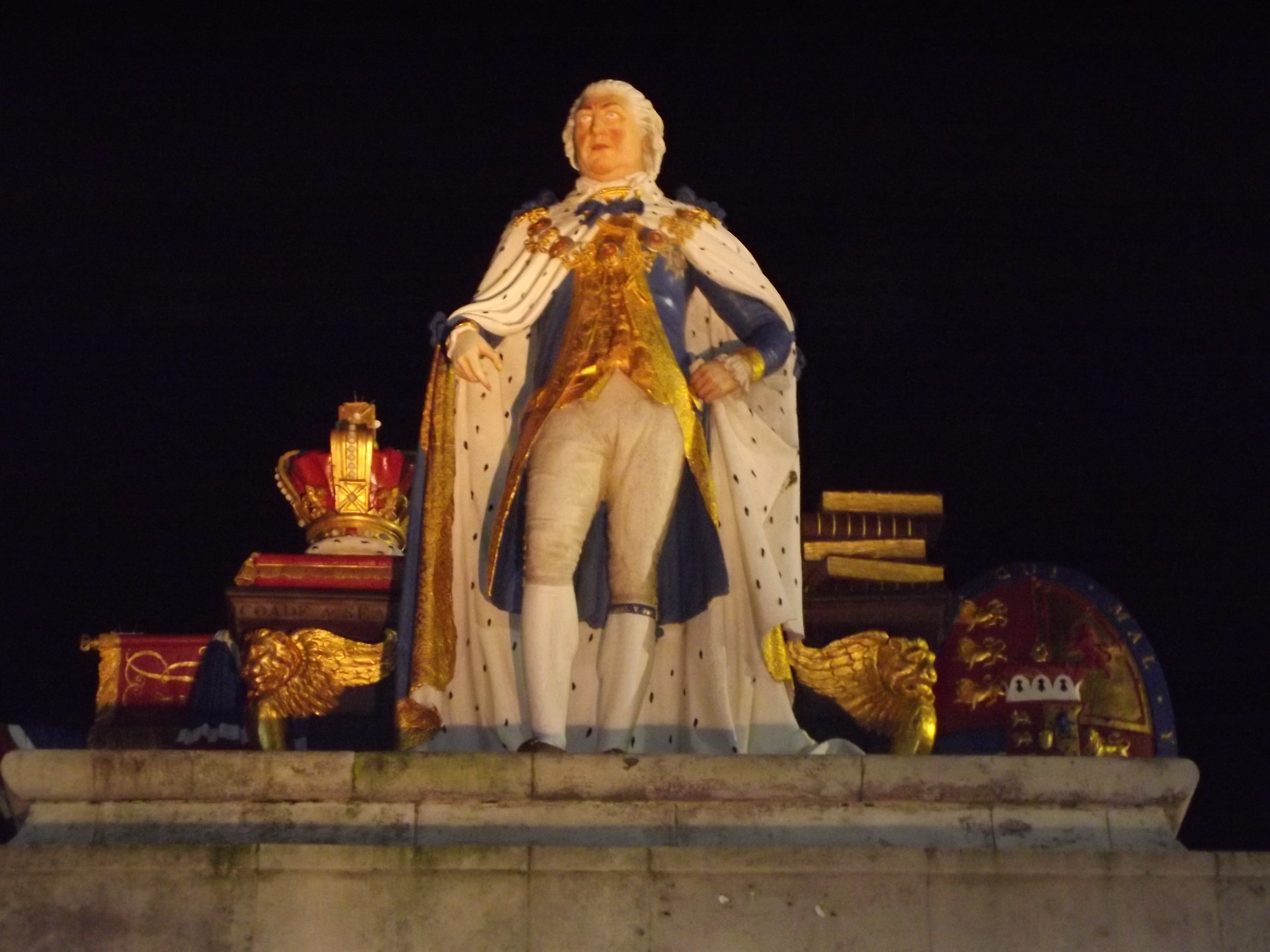
A statue of George III at Weymouth, erected in 1809, to commemorate the Golden Jubilee of King George III

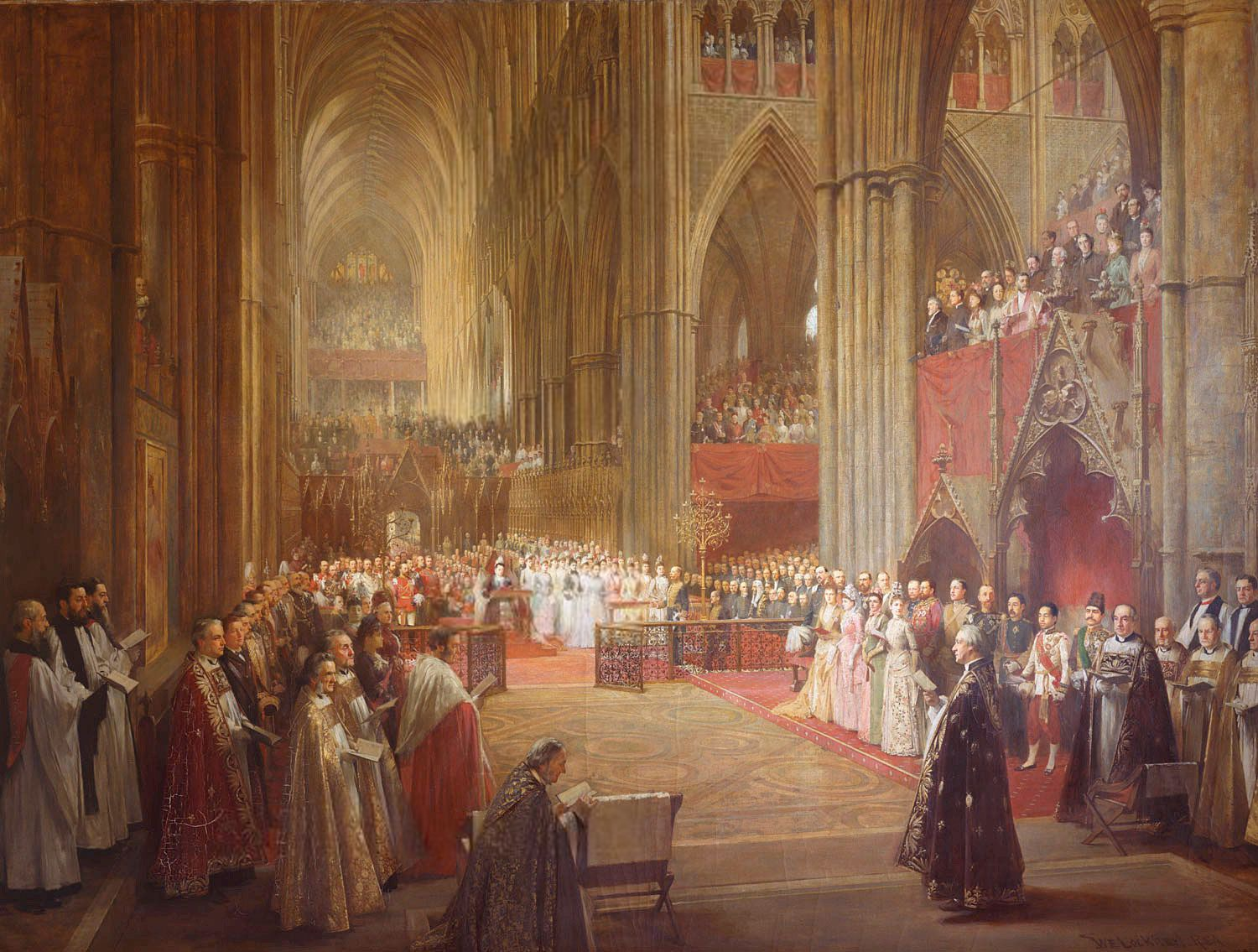
Queen Victoria's Golden Jubilee Service, Westminster Abbey, 21 June 1887

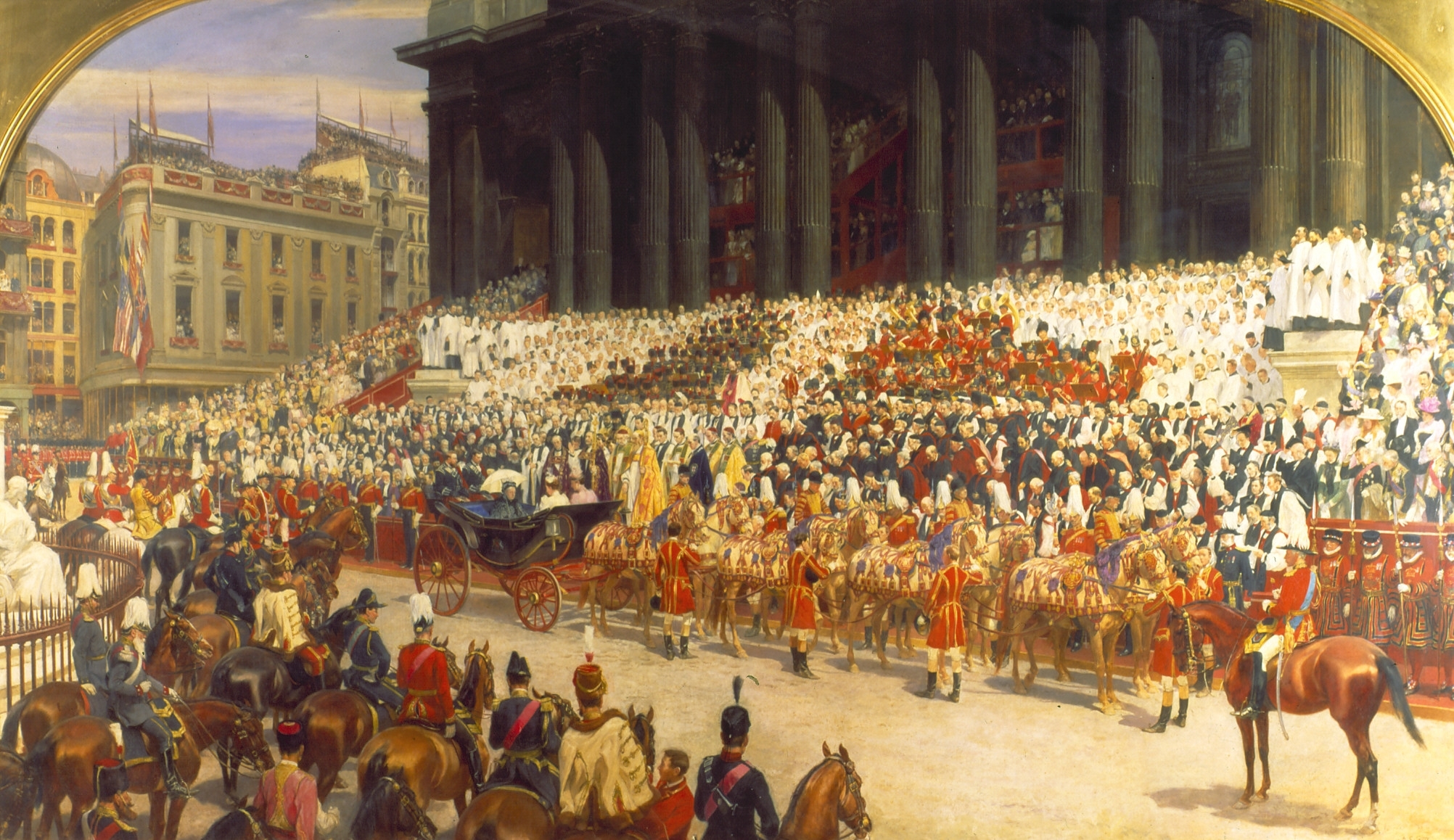
Queen Victoria's Diamond Jubilee Service, St. Paul's Cathedral, 22 June 1897

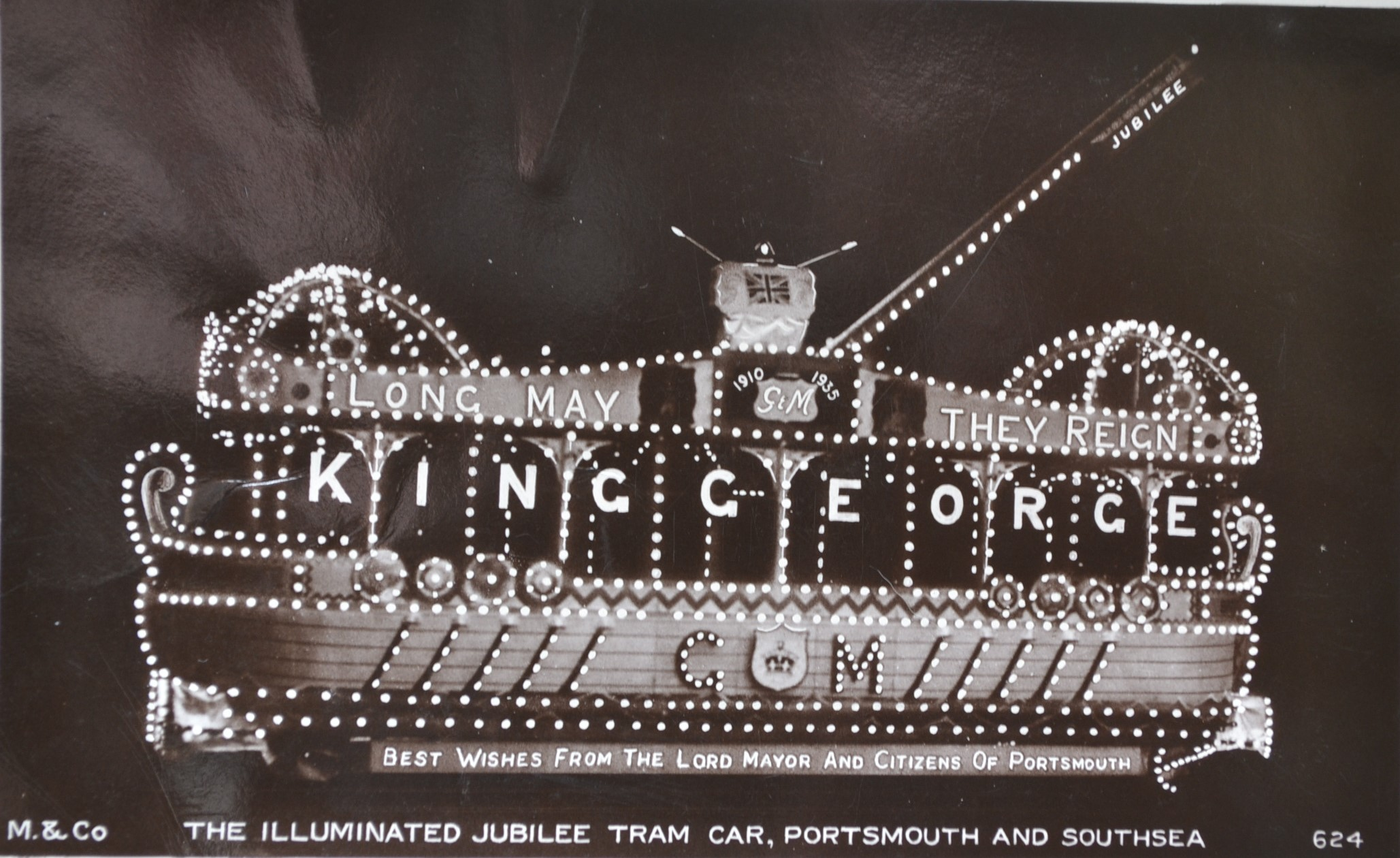
A postcard showing an illuminated tramcar of the Portsmouth Corporation Tramways celebrating the Silver Jubilee of King George V.

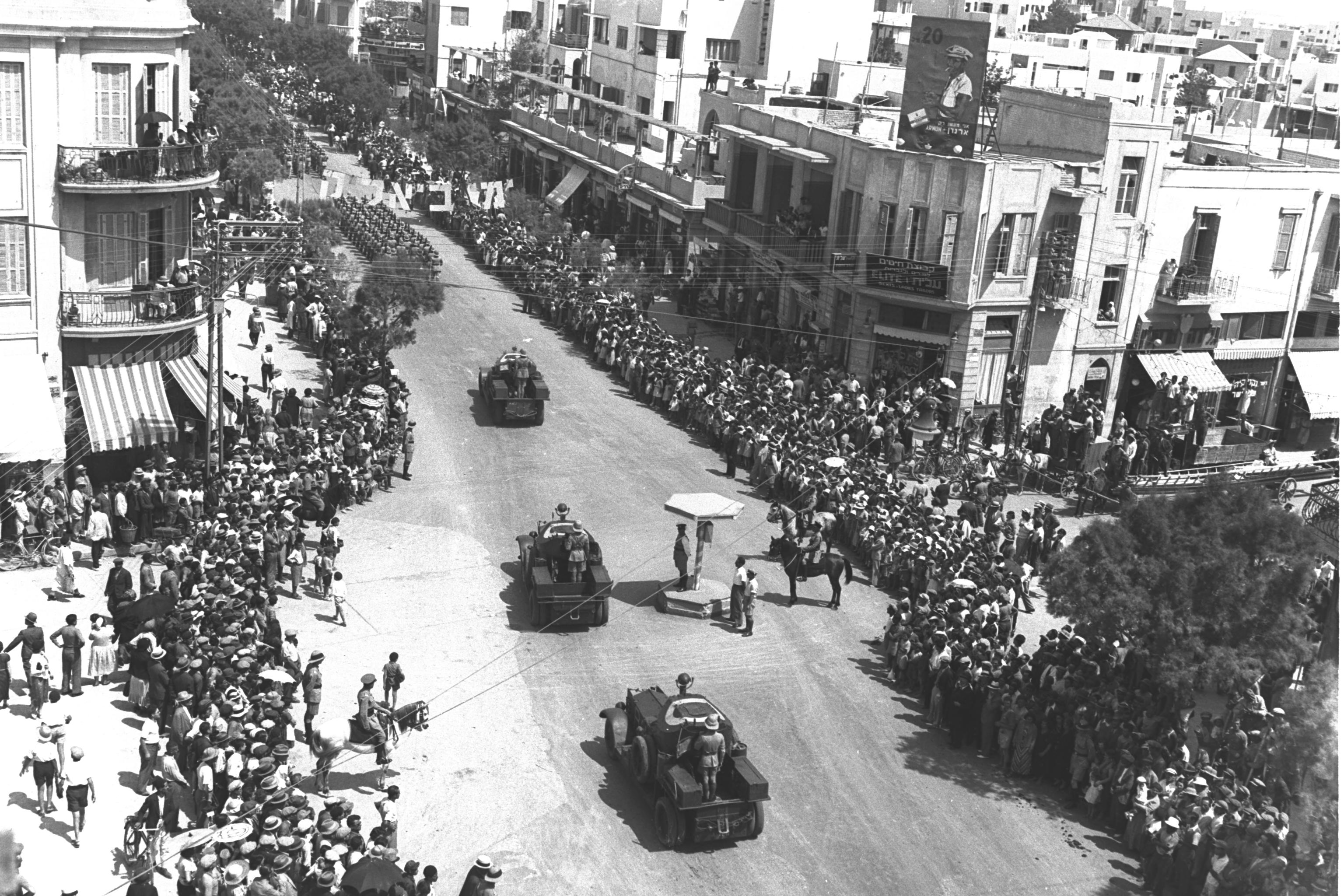
British armoured vehicles parading through Allenby Street in Tel Aviv, in honor of the Silver Jubilee of King George V in 1935

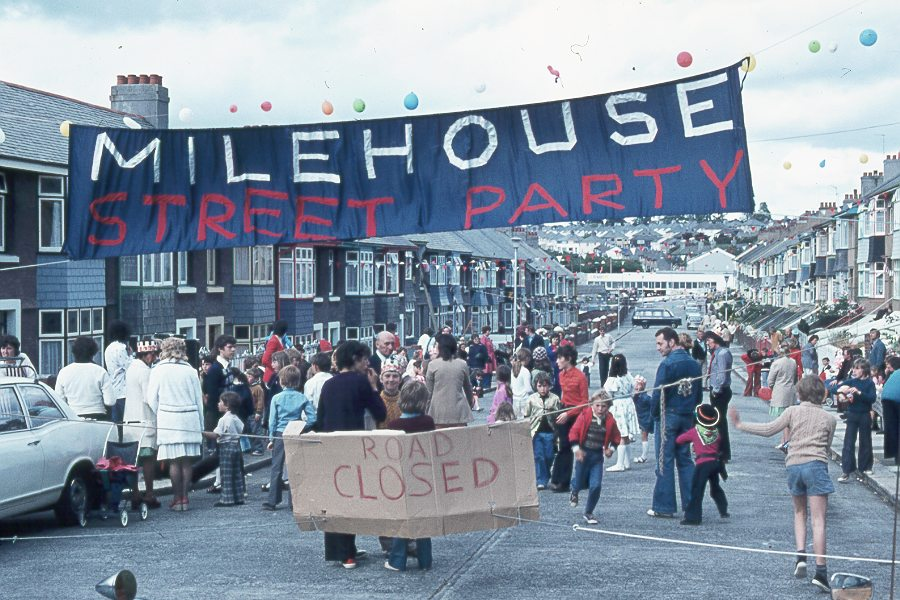
Elaborate street parties were thrown across the United Kingdom, like this one at Fullerton Road, Plymouth, for the Silver Jubilee of Queen Elizabeth II in 1977

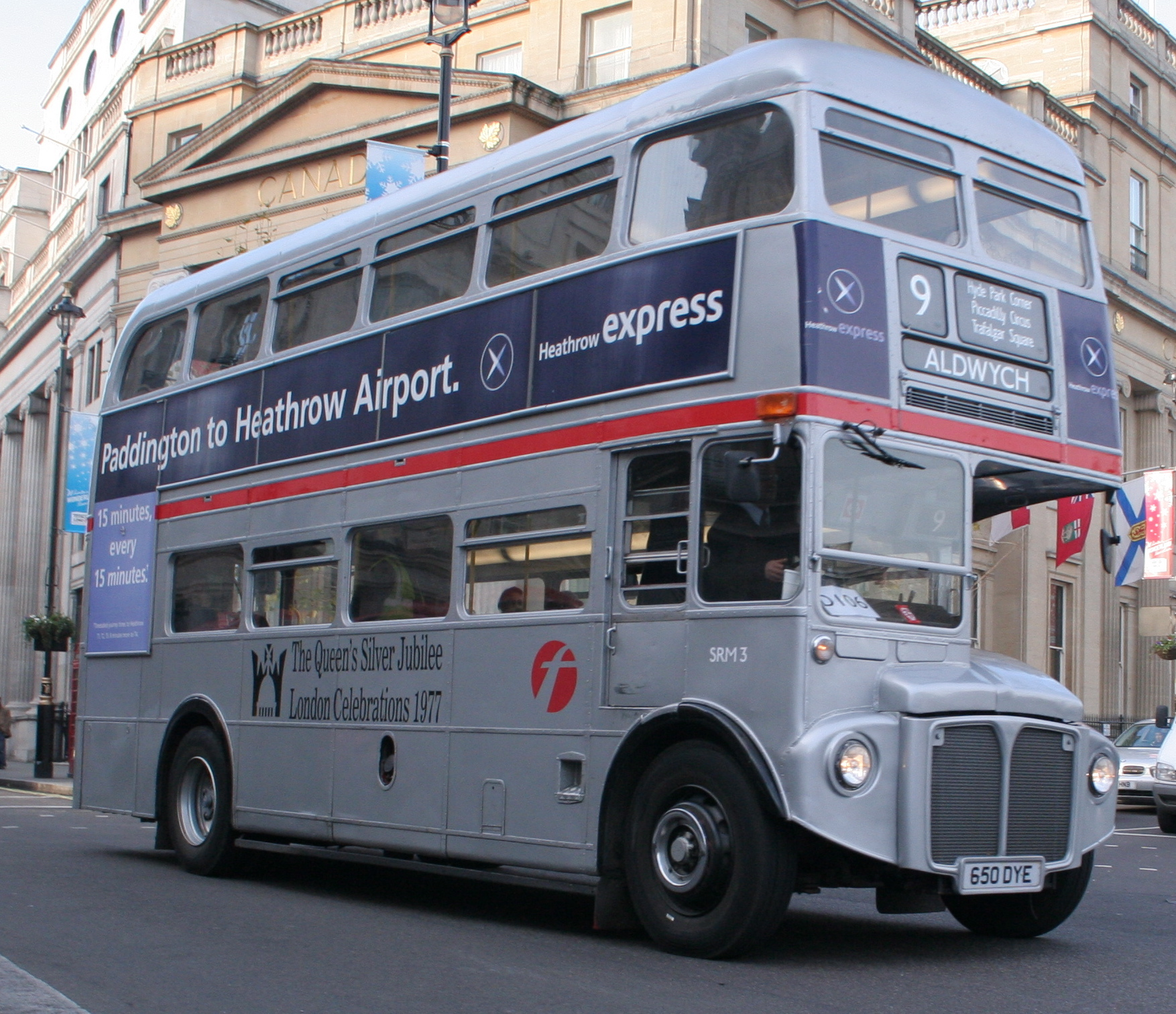
One of the twenty-five London Routemaster buses painted silver to commemorate the Silver Jubilee of Queen Elizabeth II

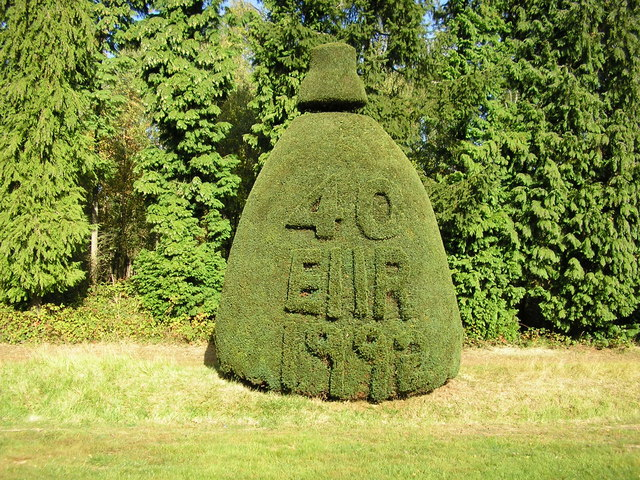
A Yew clipped at Yew Tree Avenue, Clipsham, Rutland to commemorate the Ruby Jubilee of Queen Elizabeth II in 1992

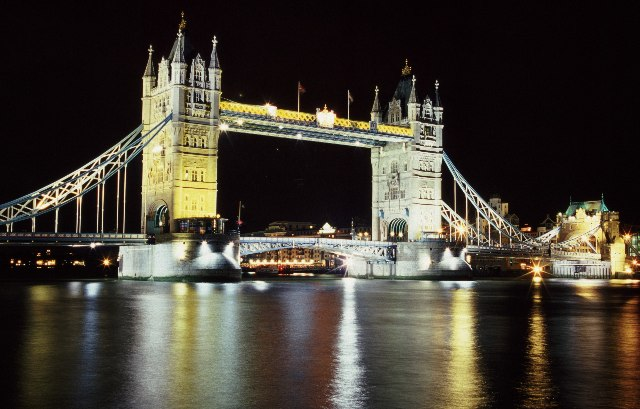
For much of 2002, the Tower Bridge was floodlit in gold rather than the usual white, in celebration of the Queen's Golden Jubilee

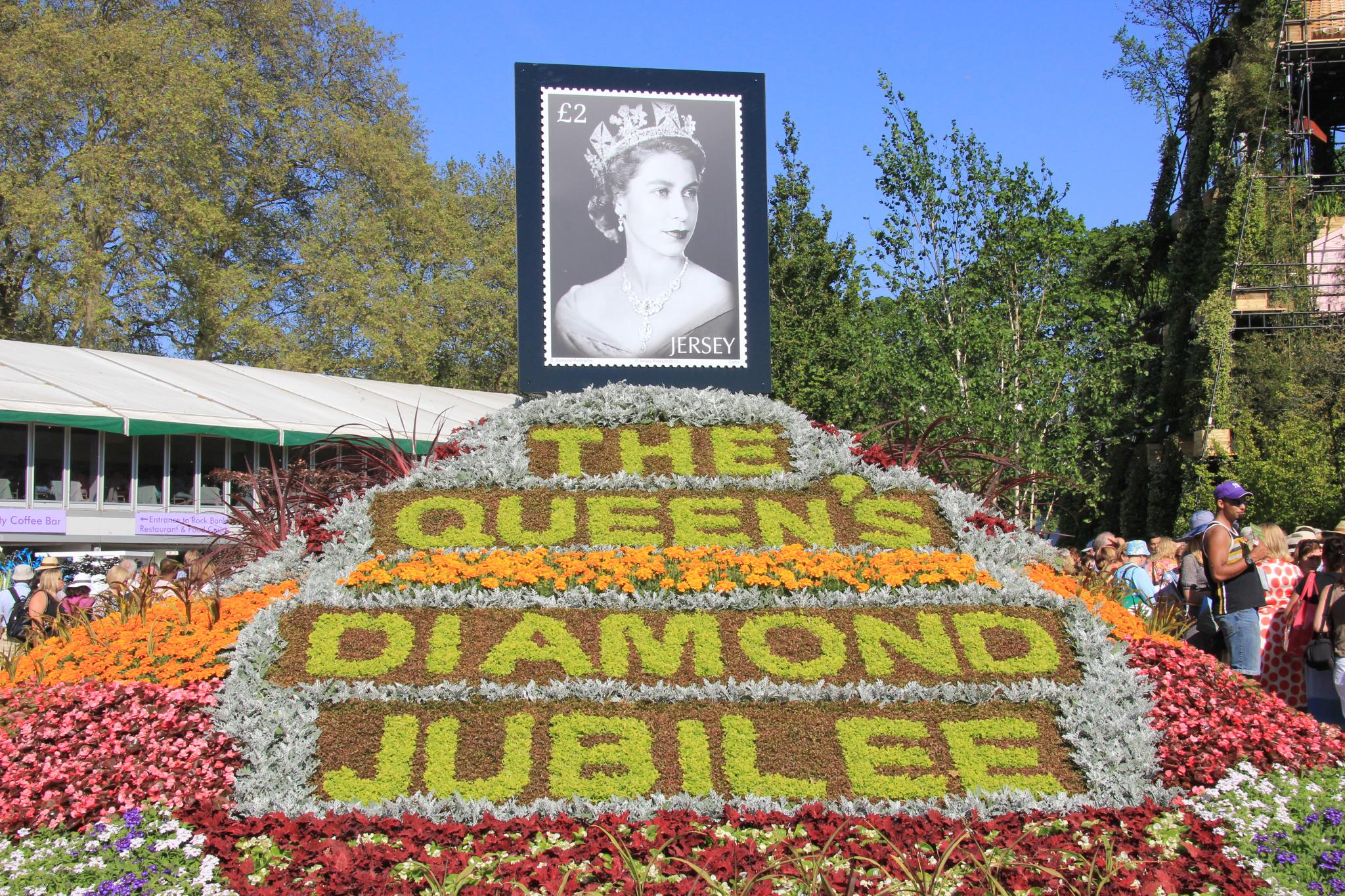
Queen Elizabeth II's Diamond Jubilee Floral display at the RHS Chelsea Flower Show in London, 2012

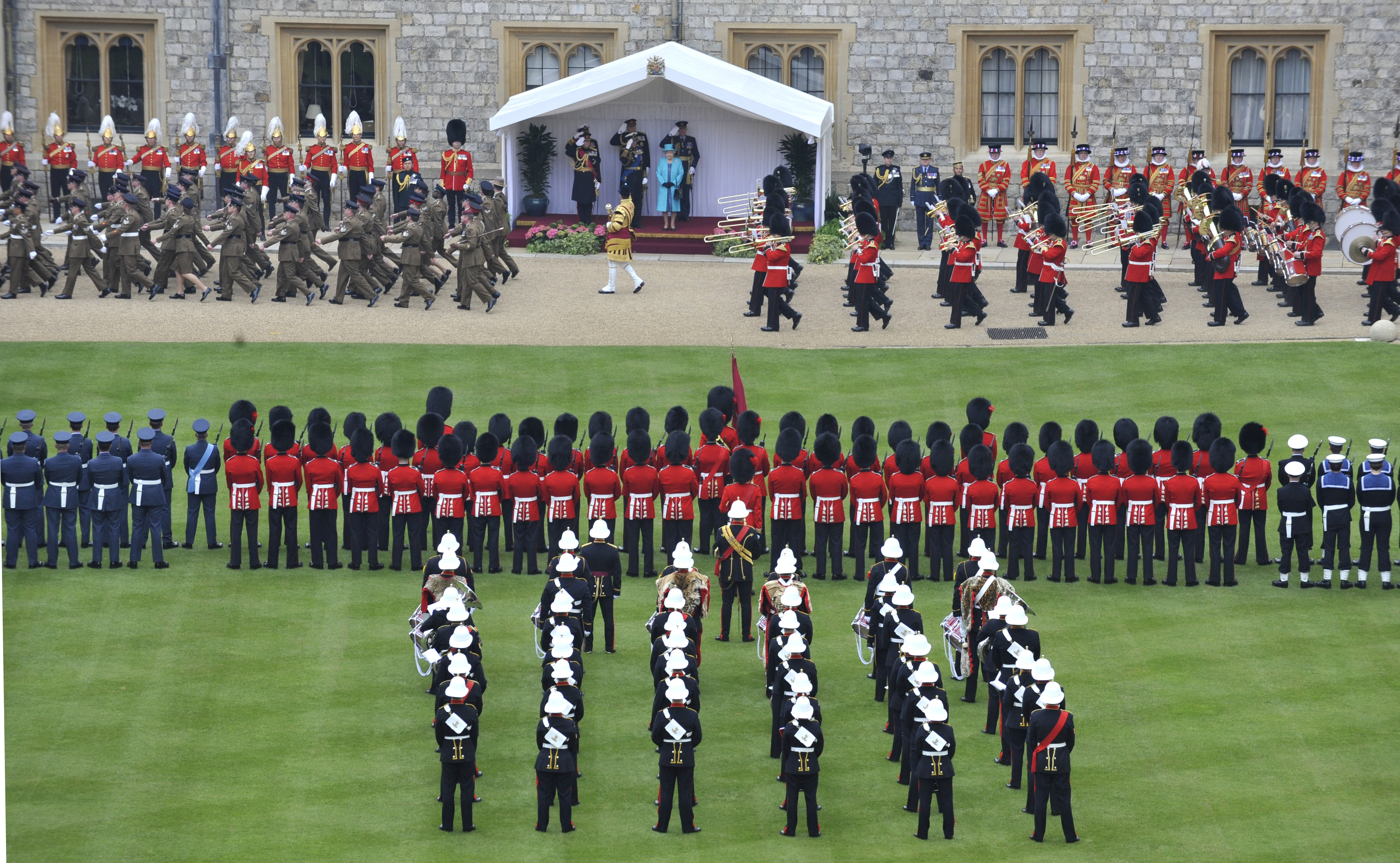
The Diamond Jubilee Armed Forces Parade and Muster at Windsor Castle in May 2012

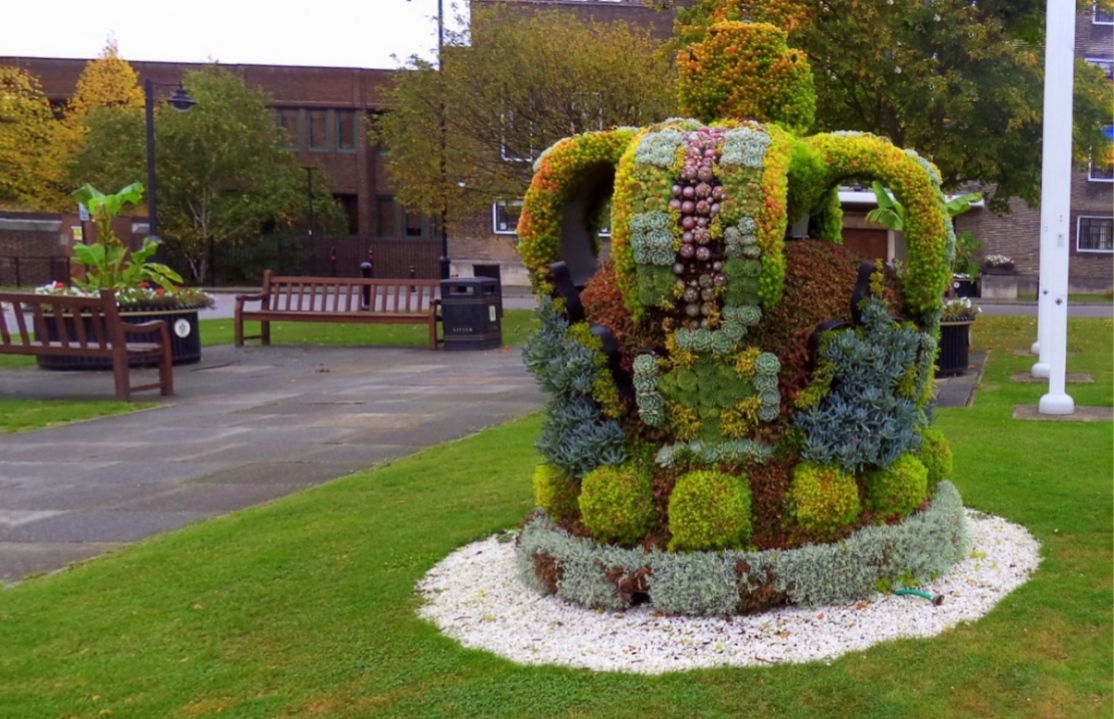
A special crown-shaped topiary created to commemorate the Queen's Sapphire Jubilee at Romford, England, 2017

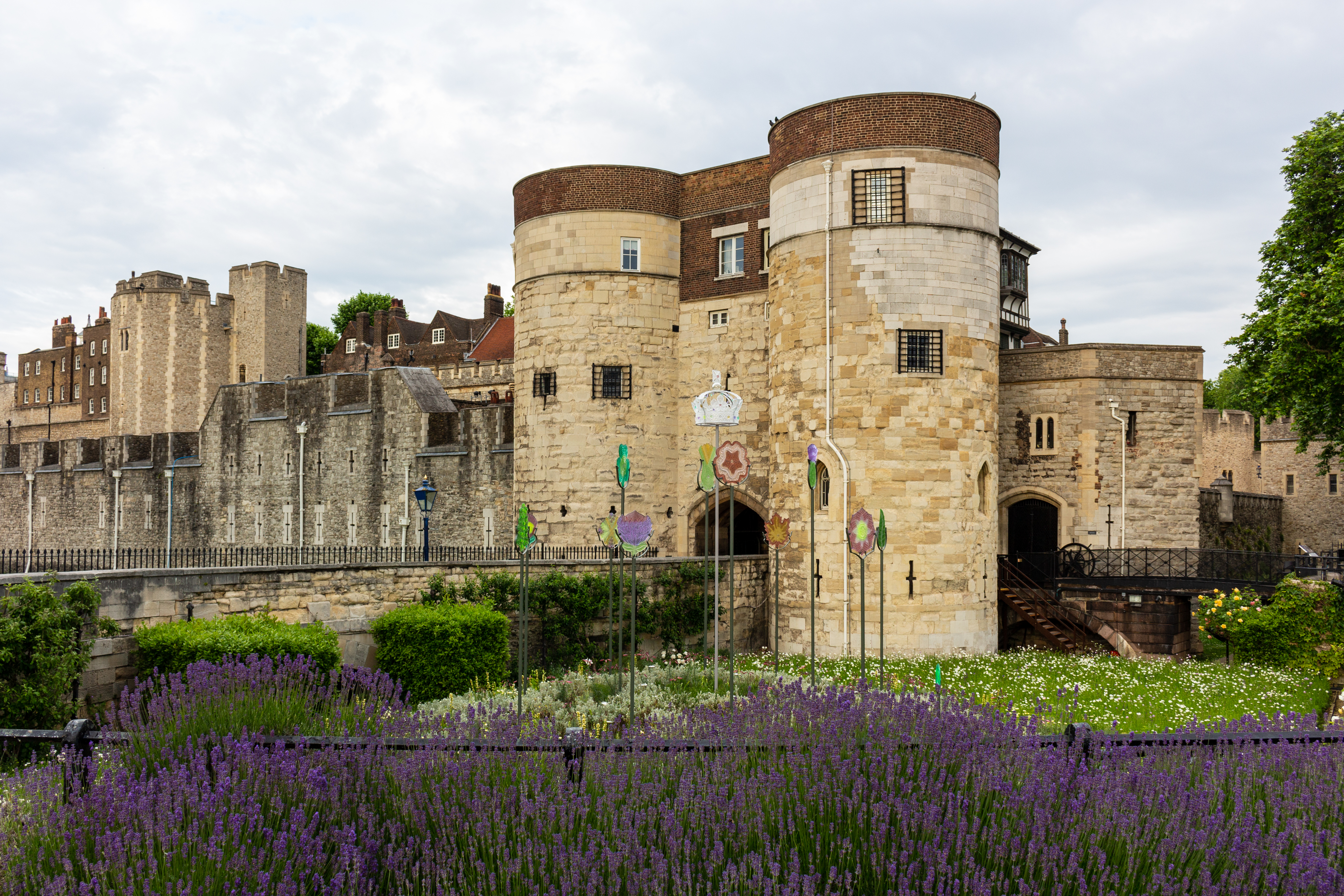
Flower display Superbloom at the Tower of London for the Queen's platinum Jubilee, 2022

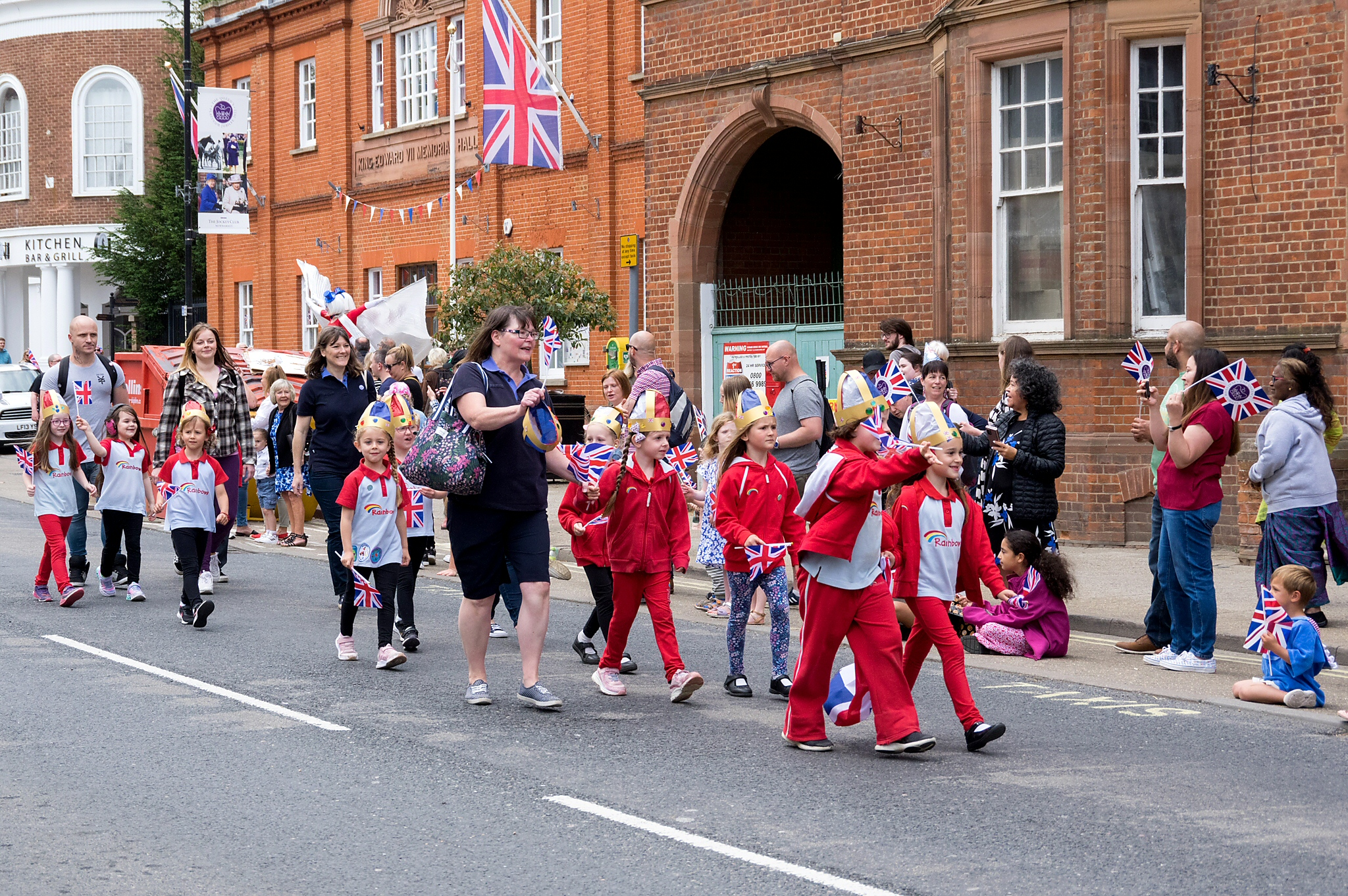
Newmarket Jubilee Parade & Party, 2022

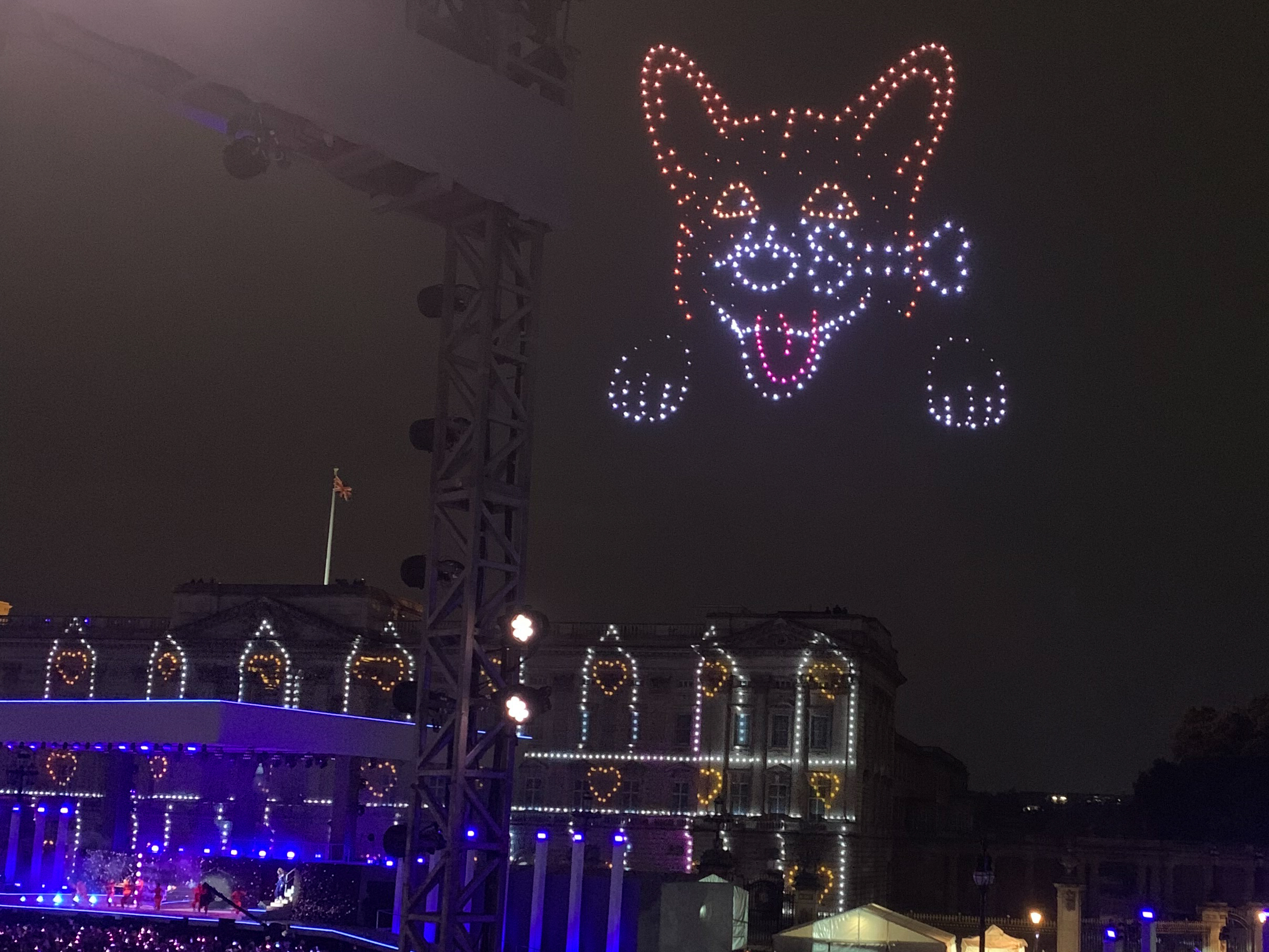
Drones forming a corgi above Buckingham Palace during the Platinum Party at the Palace, 2022
