= Jubilee Rock =

Grade II listed large rock in Blisland, Cornwall, England

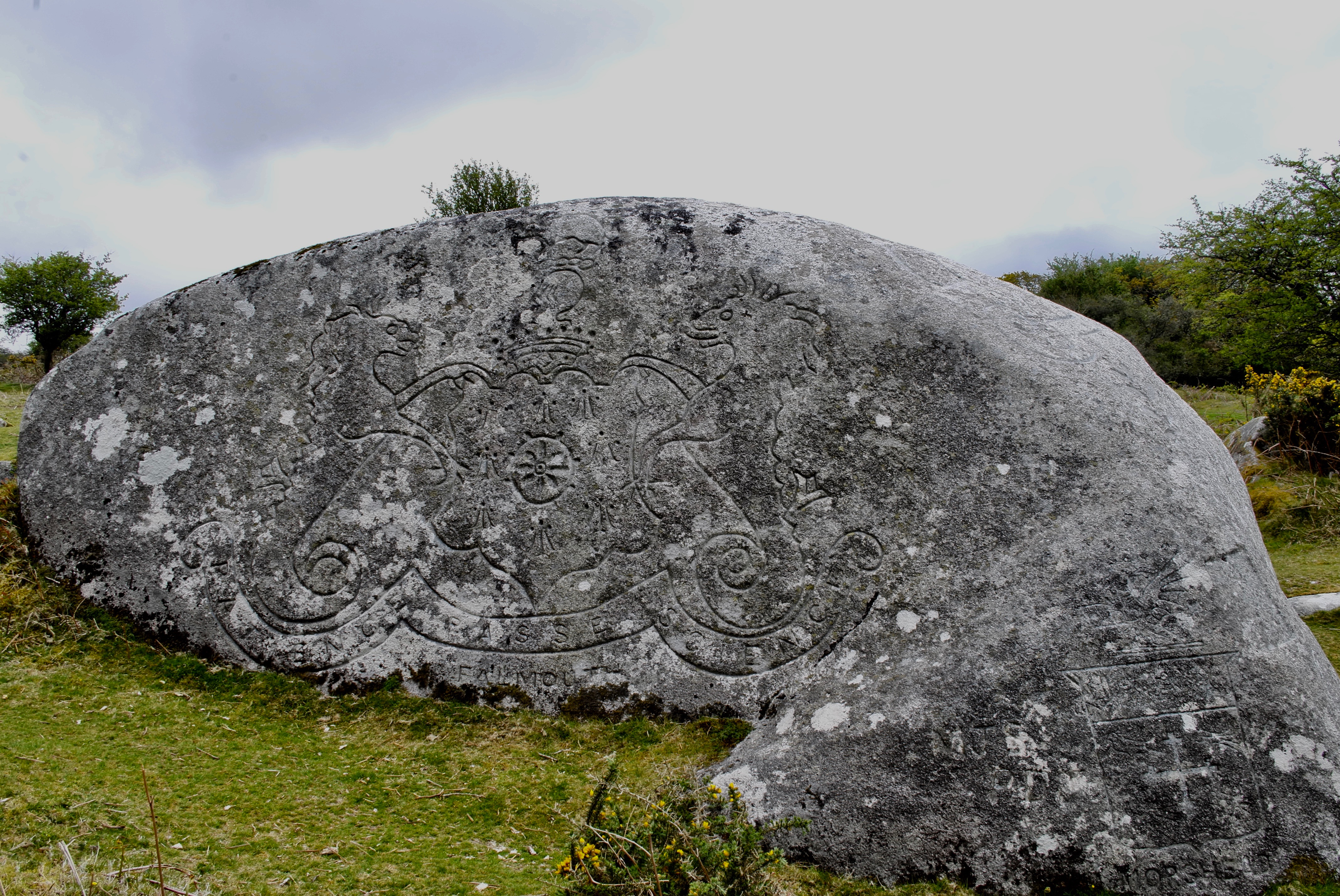

- Location within Cornwall
- 50.5373°N 4.6741°W
- Location: Blisland, Cornwall, England

Listed Building – Grade II
- Official name: Jubilee Rock
- Designated: 11 November 1987
- Reference no.: 1142390

Jubilee Rock is a Grade II listed large rock on Pendrift Downs in the parish of Blisland, Cornwall, England. On the north side is carved the Falmouth and Morshead coat of arms and the Molesworth coat of arms on the south side. It was originally decorated in 1810 by Lieut. John Rogers to celebrate the fiftieth anniversary of the accession of King George III and was restored in 1859 and 1887. Two more inscriptions have been added: these commemorate the Golden Jubilee of Queen Victoria (1887) and the Golden Jubilee of Elizabeth II (2002).

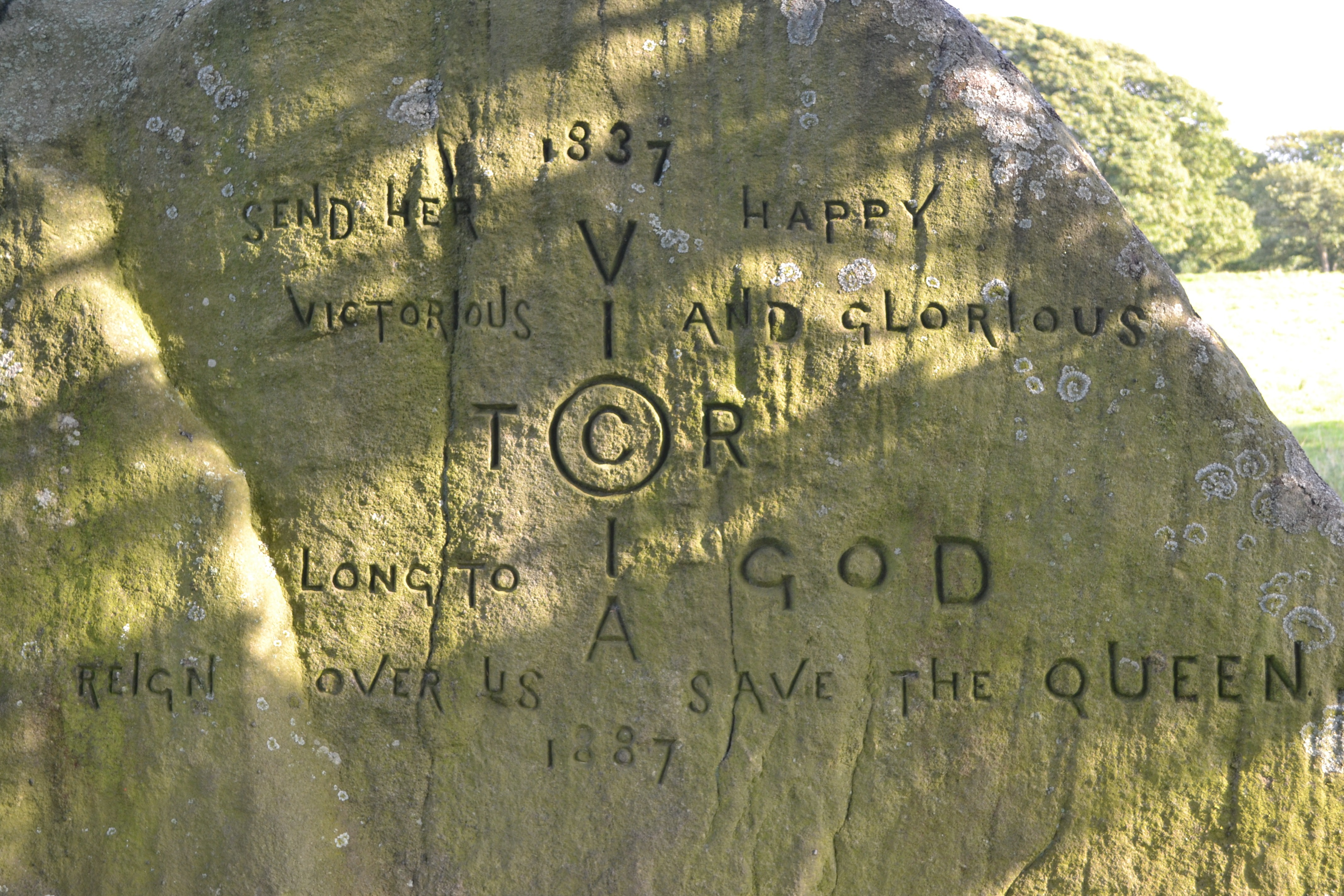
Inscription marking Victoria's golden jubilee (1887).

It is considered to be the oldest stone on Bodmin Moor. It is 10 feet high and 25 feet across and stands at 213 metres above sea level.

One author has implied that Jubilee Rock was previously a Logan stone, although the quoted source indicates that the dimensions are significantly different casting doubt on the assertion.
