= Ottó Solymosi =

Hungarian director (1927–2024)

Otto Solymosi
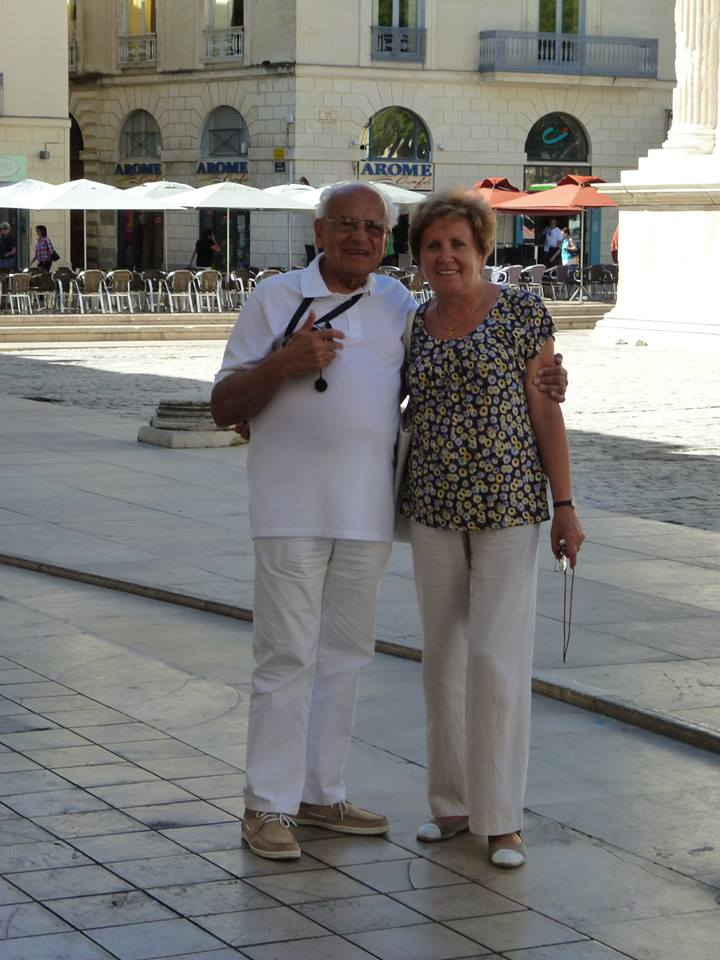
- Born: Solymosi Ottó; 20 February 1927; Budapest, Hungary
- Died: 18 February 2024 (aged 96)
- Occupation: Director

Ottó Solymosi (20 February 1927 – 18 February 2024) was a director of Magyar Rádió (MR). Solymosi graduated from the Academy of Dramatic and Cinematic Art and started his career at the Royal Revue Theatre in 1948. Since 1954 he has been a director of MR, and in 1974 he became a member of the National Television's director's staff. He was a member of the National Association of Hungarian Journalists.

Solymosi, who received a well merited Jászai Mari Award in 1974, was named Chief Director of Magyar Rádió in 1983.

== Selected works ==
=== Theatre ===
- Fényes-Kertész: Csacsifogat;
- Kodály:Háry János;
- Kálmán:Csárdáskirálynő;
- Vaszary-Solymosi:Ki a harmadik?;

=== Radio ===
- Molnár:A Pál utcai fiúk;
- Móricz:Rokonok;
- Vadnai-Solymosi:Aki felütötte a telefonkönyvet;

For television Solymosi directed "50 Years of Hungarian Radio" in 1975. He continued to work for radio and the stage, and has organized and produced many shows in North America for Hungarian communities in Toronto, Montreal, New York, and Washington D.C.

Otto Solymosi has a son, Andras Solymosi, a grandchild, Andrea, and seven honorary grandchildren, Virág, Kende, Csillag, Tündér, Kincső, Kevin and Dominick.
