= King's Statue =

Tribute statue to King George III in Dorset, England

Coordinates: 50.6126°N 2.4533°W

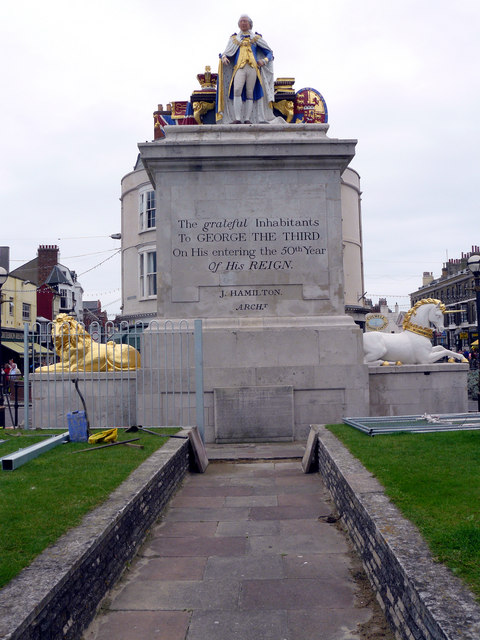
King's Statue

King's Statue is a tribute statue to King George III in Weymouth, Dorset, England. It was installed in 1809, the year which marked the Golden Jubilee of King George III. The buildings on the seafront are mostly of Georgian architecture dating from the period he was in power. It is a Grade I listed monument.

== History ==
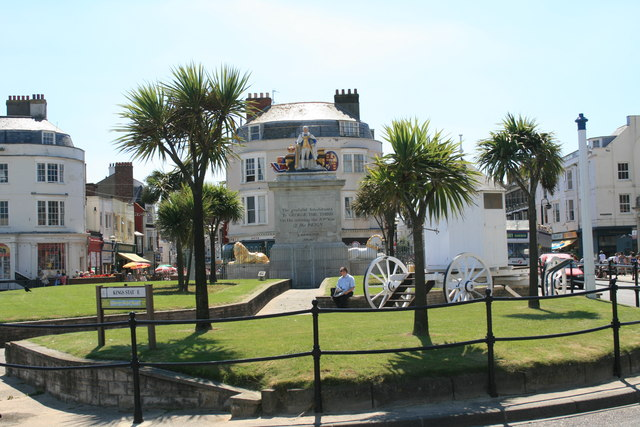
General view of the area around the King's Statue

Weymouth was much enjoyed by the King George III who would often take holidays there – a total of fourteen separate occasions, the first in 1789. With his patronage of the town, the king changed the fortune of Weymouth, and a lot of the buildings along the seafront are mostly of Georgian architecture during the king's reign. George III was originally advised to travel to Weymouth to consolidate his recovery from his first bout of serious physical and mental illness, sometimes now interpreted as porphyria. The court came with the King, and the national papers reported the event. As a result of the king's interest in the area, it was decided that Weymouth should have a statue in tribute to him. The idea was first raised in 1802 and a statue was soon designed and made – based on the designs of architect James Hamilton. However, the plan was put on hold after the king fell ill in 1805, with the structure being locked away. The year 1809 marked the beginning of the fiftieth year of the king's reign, which caused the statue to be erected in place.

During the commissioning of the statue, plans were for the statue to be situated lower down and in front of a building, where the full quality of the work would be appreciated. However, the statue's location ended up being high and out of range. It was erected at the junction of the town's two main streets, St. Mary Street and St. Thomas Street. Today the statue remains on an island in the centre of the road close to the seafront. At first, the statue was delivered to Weymouth and assembled by the supplier four years before it was erected in its present position.

Despite attempts to remove it, the statue remains a focal point of the town. In the early 20th century it became a gathering for public ceremonies and coronation celebrations. When the statue's location became a traffic island in the late 1950s, its role as a central gathering place was lost.

In 2007/8, the statue was restored following vandalism, seaside weather, and 200 years of accumulated paint and dirt. Weymouth and Portland Borough Council, funded by the Heritage Lottery Fund, had awarded the contract for the monument's restoration to Osirion Building & Conservation Ltd. It was renovated by stripping 20 layers of paintwork, replacing it with new paints and gold leaf, and replacing the iron framework with a stainless steel one.

== Design ==
The statue's figures and detail are sculpted in Coade stone, the work of the firm Coade and Sealy, on a massive Portland stone pedestal. The King is dressed in Garter robes and holds a sceptre in his right hand. He is backed by various items, including the crown on a cushion, the Royal standard and Union flag, a pile of books and a large oval shield of arms. One each side is a further low pedestal which sits a lion and a unicorn. The front inscription reads "The grateful Inhabitants, to George the Third on his entering the 50th Year of his Reign."

The statue was originally painted bronze and only became multi-coloured as late as 1948.

The monument has not always been fully appreciated, where a long Southern Times report of January 1886, reviewing the unveiling of the statue to Sir Henry Edwardes, the journalist contrasted the new statue with "...that hideous monstrosity known as the King's Statue, about the removal of which many schemes have been from time to time suggested."
