= Golden Jubilee of George III =

50th anniversary of the monarch's accession

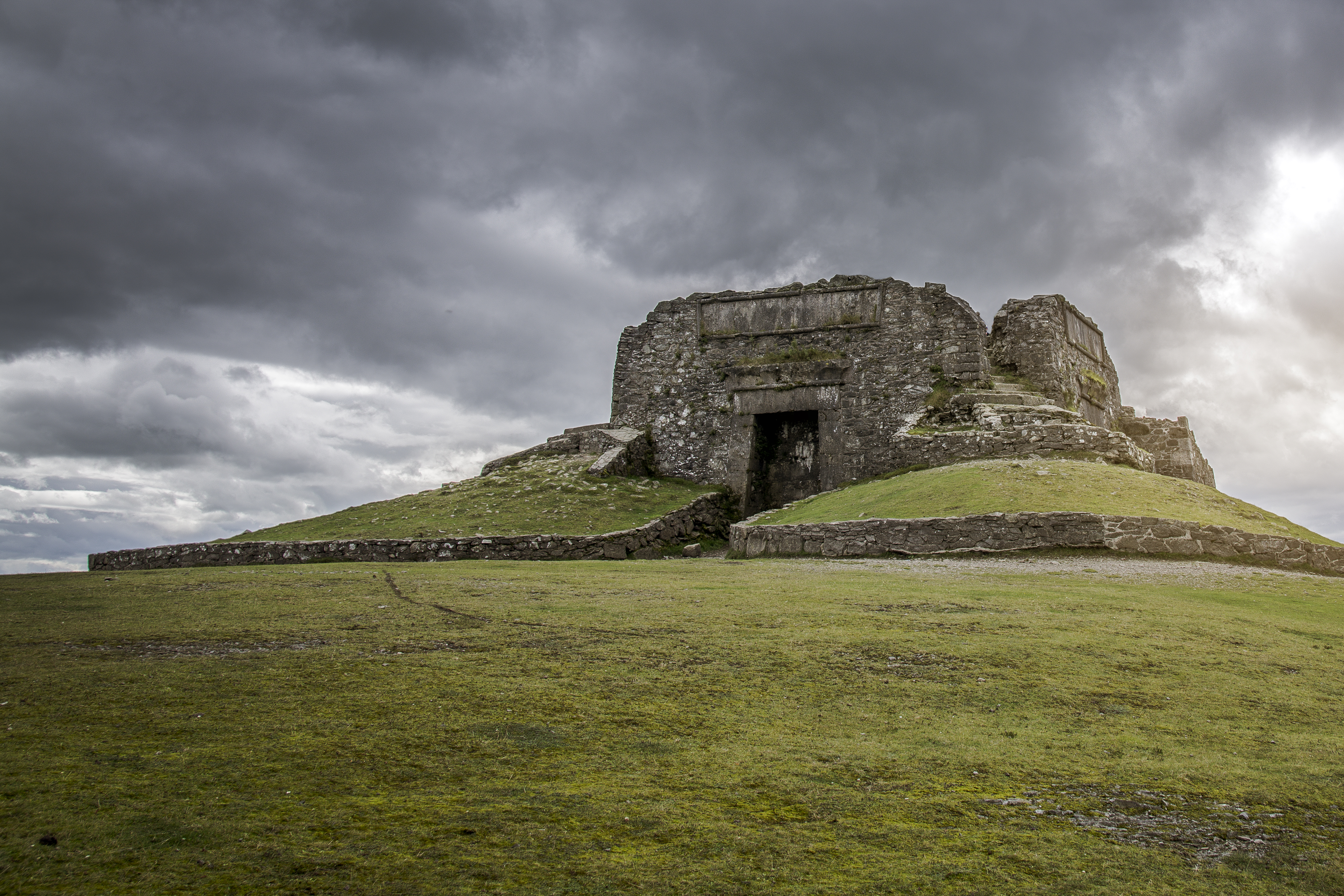
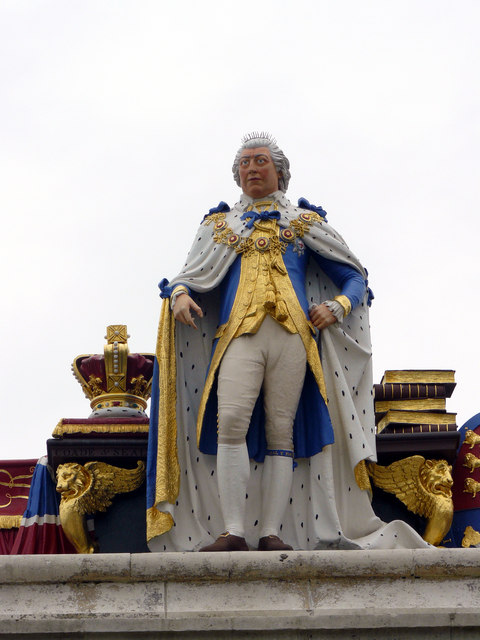
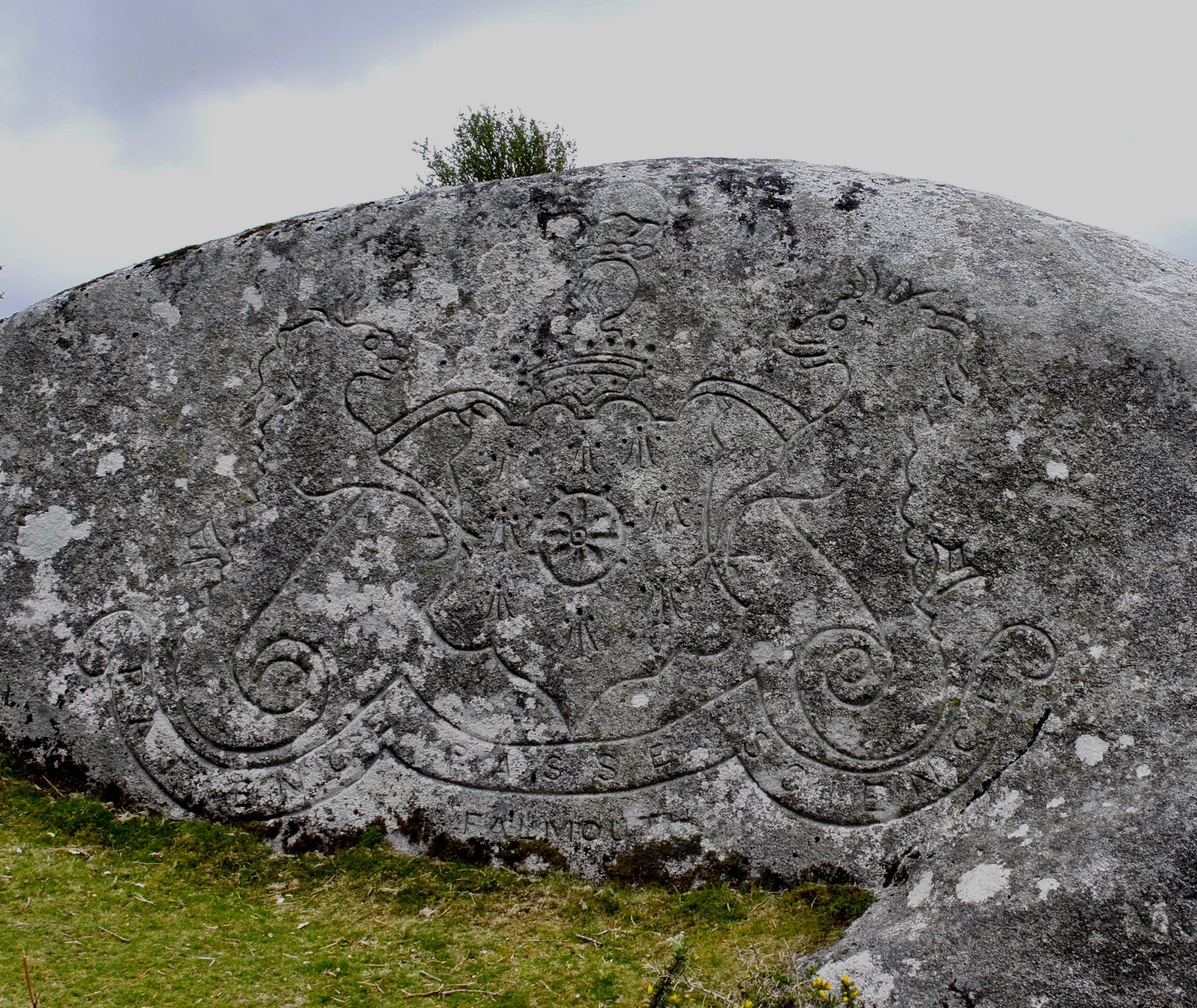
- Commemorations of the jubilee, Clockwise: Jubilee Tower on Moel Famau in North Wales; The King's Statue in Weymouth, installed in 1809 and restored in 2007/8; The Jubilee Rock in Blisland, originally decorated in 1810 and restored in 1859 and 1887
- Genre: Jubilee of British monarch
- Date: 25 October 1809; 217 years ago
- Country: United Kingdom; British Empire
- Next event: Golden Jubilee of Queen Victoria

The Golden Jubilee of George III, also known as the Grand National Jubilee, was held on 25 October 1809 to mark King George III's entrance into the 50th year of his reign. It was the first of such festivities to be celebrated in a significant way in the United Kingdom and the Colonies. The celebrations were relatively limited compared to the jubilees of some of the ensuing British monarchs.

== History ==
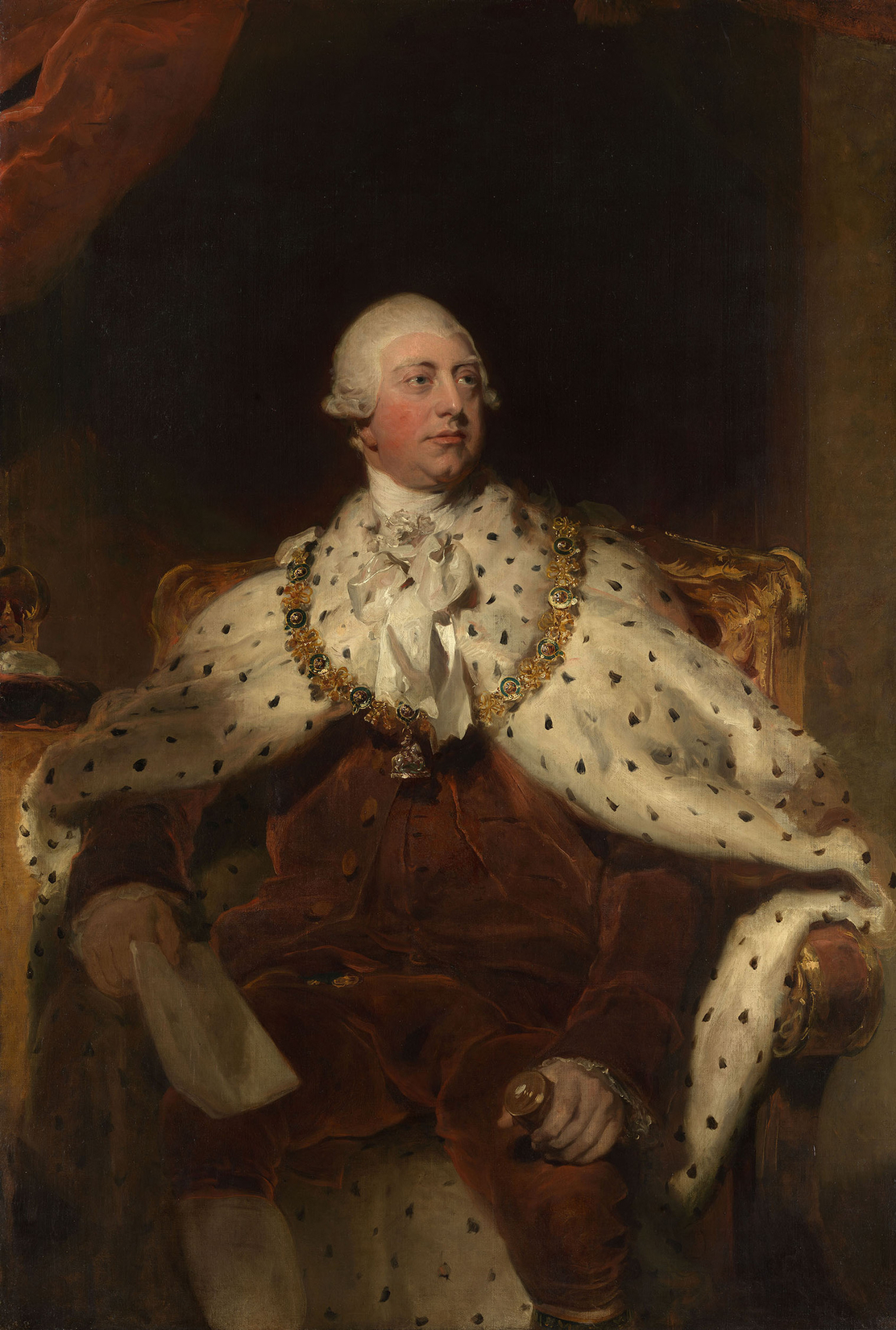
King George III poses for his Golden Jubilee portrait by Sir Thomas Lawrence, 1809

In March 1809 and with jubilee celebrations approaching, prices for candles began to rise as indoor celebrations were anticipated. Festivities in India began on 4 June, the King's Official Birthday, with the governor-general throwing a fête in Bombay, which was attended by ambassadors from within the Indian Empire and those from surrounding countries. The celebrations in the United Kingdom started with a ball at Wokingham Town Hall on 24 October 1809. The following day, the King and the Queen, along with the Duke of York, Princess Elizabeth, and the Duke of Sussex, marked the event with a private service at St George's Chapel, Windsor Castle and the King inspected a troop of soldiers, though he was not able to take part in most of the ensuing celebrations due to his declining health. The Royal Horse Guards organised an ox roast in Bachelors' Acre, Windsor, which was attended by the Queen, the Duke of York, the Duke of Kent, Princess Elizabeth, the Duke of Cumberland, and the Duke of Sussex, who were later joined by the Prince of Wales and Princess Charlotte of Wales. The Windsor Guildhall had built a massive ornate arch across the road, which the royal family and the accompanying party passed through as they entered town. "A grand fête and firework display" at Frogmore was planned and attended by the Queen, accompanied by the dukes of York, Clarence, and Sussex, and the princesses Augusta, Elizabeth, and Sophia. Among other attendees were the Earl of Uxbridge, the Earl and Countess Harcourt, the Earl and Countess of Cardigan, Lord St Helens, and Lord Walsingham.

Shops were closed to allow for people's participation in festivities and the Lord Mayor of London and the City of London Corporation took part in a procession to St Paul's Cathedral, which culminated in a service of thanksgiving and later a dinner at the Mansion House. Around 400 merchants and bankers met at the Merchant Taylors' Hall, where they were joined by the earls of Westmorland, Chatham, Bathurst, Camden, Liverpool, St Vincent, as well as lords Harrowby, Mulgrave and Berkshire. A number of children were christened Jubilee George or Jubilee Charlotte in honour of the King and Queen.

Military deserters and prisoners of war were pardoned and debtors were discharged, excluding those who were of French origin due to the ongoing Napoleonic Wars. Among landmarks commissioned to mark the occasion were a monument erected in Windsor and unveiled in the presence of the Queen, the King's Statue in Weymouth, the Jubilee Rock in Blisland, and the Jubilee Tower in Moel Famau. A special series of jugs were also produced in Liverpool to commemorate the jubilee. Two sets of medals were also struck, the King George III Jubilee Medal and the King George III and Queen Charlotte Jubilee Medal.

In Ireland, a ball was held at Dublin Castle on 27 October 1809 to mark the Jubilee, hosted by Charlotte Lennox, Duchess of Richmond, whose husband was then Lord Lieutenant of Ireland. Charles Johnston Coote hosted a large party on 25 October at Bellamont Forest, Cootehill. In Belfast, there were illuminations at the Nelson Club and Exchange Rooms, and a "transparency" (projection) of the King was displayed at Donegall Place. Girls born around the time were called "Jubilee." The goldsmiths of Dublin established an asylum for aged members called the Goldsmiths' Jubilee Asylum.

== See also ==
- Grand Jubilee of 1814
- Golden Jubilee of Queen Victoria
- Golden Jubilee of Elizabeth II
- Golden Jubilee of Margrethe II
- Golden Jubilee of Carl XVI Gustaf
