= Zoltán Solymosi =

Hungarian ballet dancer (born 1967)

Zoltán Solymosi (born 12 December 1967 in Budapest) is a Hungarian ballet dancer. He is a former Principal Dancer with a number of international ballet companies including the British Royal Ballet and the Dutch National Ballet. His younger brother, Tamas Solymosi is also a dancer.

== Early career ==
Solymosi trained at the Budapest Ballet Academy in Budapest, Hungary. His first major engagement was in 1986 at the Dutch National Ballet. He left that company after a three-year stint stating of the experience, "Basically, I had personal problems with the director." to dance with the Munich State Opera in 1989. Solymosi went on in 1990 to dance at La Scala in Milan. Solymosi also during this time appeared as a guest artist with the Hungarian State Ballet in Budapest.

== Royal Ballet ==
After appearing as a Guest Artist with the Royal Ballet at the invitation of artistic director, Sir Antony Dowell in 1991, Solymosi was invited to join the company as a Principal Danseur in 1992. He quickly gained experience dancing all the major roles in the repertoire. He appeared in numerous Royal Galas partnering Viviana Durante as the Prince in Sir Anthony Dowell's 1994 production of Tchaikovsky's famous ballet The Sleeping Beauty. The production was televised and later released on DVD. Solymosi also partnered Darcey Bussell in 1991 in a pas de deux in Winter Dreams, a tribute to Tchaikovsky. This was also televised. Solymosi had earlier appeared in 1993 in a role created especially for him by Matthew Hart in the ballet, Fanfare;. In 1994 Solymosi toured with the Royal Ballet to the United States where he appeared in as the brutal foreman in Kenneth MacMillan's The Judas Tree. Speaking of his time at the Royal Ballet, Solymosi said, "Then I found some nice repertoire roles, like Rudolf in (MacMillan's) 'Mayerling' and Basil in Baryshnikov's 'Don Quixote.' I decided to sign a permanent contract. I haven't regretted it so far.". Speaking of how different the Royal Ballet was compared to other companies he had worked for Solymosi stated, "They have a different style of dancing here ... The English school is so different from my Russian (training). In Budapest, we have the Vaganova school, which is real, pure Russian style. What I really find difficult is to place myself (according to the English style) in ballets. They give me corrections. Of course, they want me to look good. But that is what they believe in. I have my own school. Diplomatically, it's difficult. But it's worth it.". He added, "I need the change. It's important for an artist to have a wide view. You have to see and think through a lot of things. But for that you need to travel, to see different things, to decide what is good and not good, to refine your taste.". In 1995, Solymosi left the Royal Ballet to pursue a freelance career.

== Freelance career ==
After leaving the Royal Ballet, Solymosi danced as a guest artist with the English National Ballet

== Later career ==
Solymosi retired from dancing in 1996 and returned to Budapest where he took up a position as teacher at his alma mater. He specialises in training male dancers and his students have gone on to dance at some of the leading European ballet companies.

== Movies ==
- Gala Tribute to Tchaikovsky (TV movie, 1993) - dancer
- The House (TV biographical film, 1996) - himself
