= Gothra (disambiguation) =

Gothra is a Hindu clan or lineage, an alternative spelling of Gotra

Gothra may also refer to the following places in India:

- Gothra, Bhiwani, village in Bhiwani district, Haryana, India
- Gothra, Rewari, village in Rewari district, Haryana, India
- Gothra, Rajasthan, town in JhunJhunu district, Rajasthan, India
- Gothra, Gujarat, a village and jagir in the princely state of Kamadia, India
