= Jubilee =

Particular anniversary; in the Bible, the fiftieth

A jubilee is often used to refer to a celebration, commemoration, or anniversary. "Jubilation" for joyful celebration comes from "jubilee". The term comes from the Hebrew Bible, initially concerning a recurring religious observance involving a set number of years, that notably involved freeing of debt slaves. Emperors of ancient Rome customarily marked anniversaries of their rule with celebrations, although they did not use the term "jubilee." Jubilee is also a term used in Roman Catholicism for special years. The term came into English usage from translation of the Bible, together with customary celebration of a reign, and at least since the 19th century is regularly used to denote the celebrations associated with the reign of monarchs after a milestone number of years have passed.

== Religious usage ==
The jubilee (Hebrew: יובל yovel) year (every 50th year) and the sabbatical year (every seventh year) are Biblical commandments concerning ownership of land and slaves. The laws concerning the sabbatical year are still observed by many religious Jews in the State of Israel, while the jubilee has not been observed for many centuries, if at all (before the 'peshitto' era of the Vulgate-inspired bible). According to the Hebrew Bible, every seventh year farmers in the land of Israel are commanded to let their land lie fallow, and slaves were freed. The celebration of the jubilee is the fiftieth year, that is, the year after seven sabbatical cycles. Jubilee was to recognize that by tradition all property belongs to God, not the individual Jew. For the Jew, returning of possessions to God was/is a religious vow or dedication.

In Roman Catholic tradition, a jubilee is "a special year called by the church to receive blessing and pardon from God" instituted every 50 or 25 years since the year 1300.

== Terms for anniversaries ==
Following the model of Augustus, the Roman emperors typically celebrated major jubilees on the 10th years of their reigns. The decennalia marked the 10th year, the vicennalia the 20th, and—in the case of Constantine the Great—the tricennalia the 30th. Smaller festivals sometimes occurred on the 5th years between these. For modern monarchs, the dates are typically connected with precious metals and gemstones:

- Silver jubilee, for a 25th anniversary.
- Ruby jubilee, for a 40th anniversary.
- Golden jubilee, for a 50th anniversary.
- Diamond jubilee, for either a 60th or 75th anniversary.
- Sapphire jubilee, for a 65th anniversary.
- Platinum jubilee, for a 70th anniversary.

== See also ==
- Hierarchy of precious substances
- Jubilee line, a London Underground line named after the Silver Jubilee of Elizabeth II
- Wedding anniversary – Commercial gifts
