= Anniversary =

Date of an event from a previous year

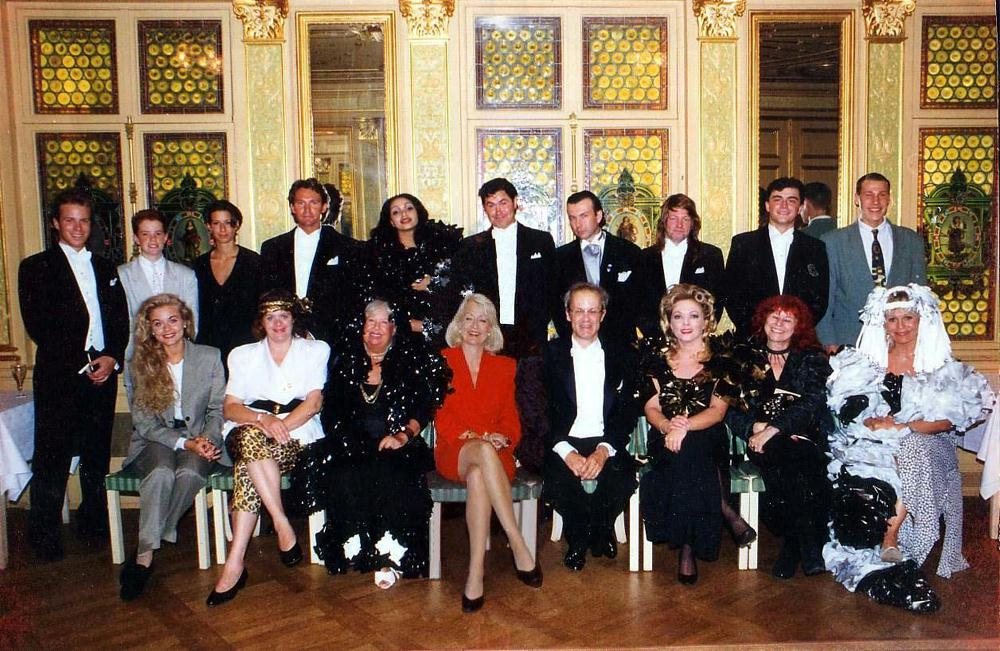
Swedish celebrities including Miss Sweden Johanna Lind, Camilla Henemark, Alexandra Charles and Christina Schollin celebrate the 100th anniversary of the birth of Mae West at Berns in Stockholm in 1993

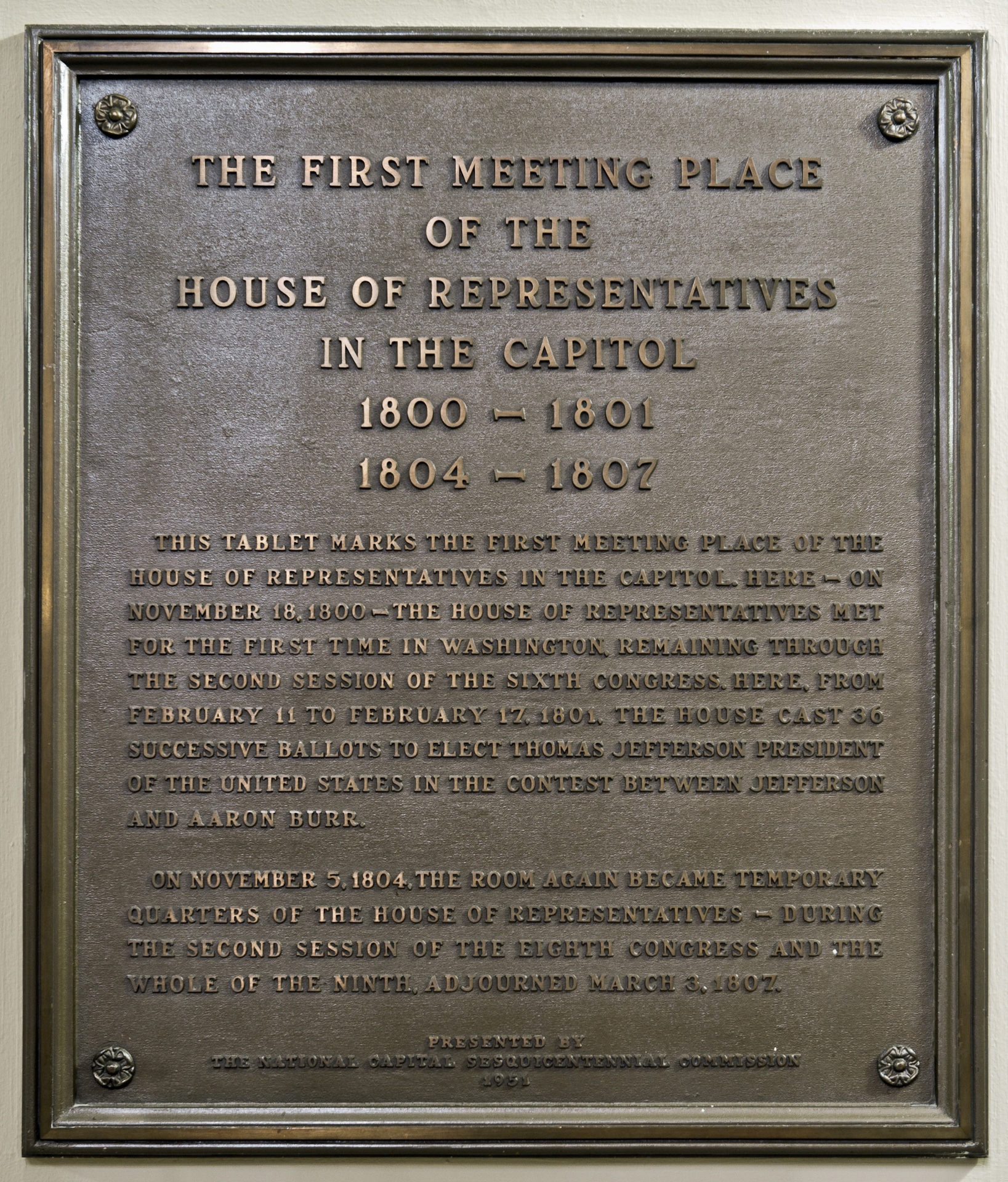
Memorial plaque presented by the National Capital Sesquicentennial Commission in Washington, D.C., in 1951

An anniversary is the date on which an event took place or an institution was founded.

Most countries celebrate national anniversaries, typically called national days. These could be the date of independence of the nation or the adoption of a new constitution or form of government. There is no definite method for determining the date of establishment of an institution, and it is generally decided within the institution by convention. The important dates in a sitting monarch's reign may also be commemorated, an event often referred to as a "jubilee".

== Names ==
- Birthdays are the most common type of anniversary, on which someone's birthdate is commemorated each year. The actual celebration is sometimes moved for practical reasons, as in the case of an official birthday or one falling on February 29.
- Wedding anniversaries are also often celebrated, on the same day of the year as the wedding occurred.
- Death anniversaries.
- The Latin phrase dies natalis (literally "birth day") has become a common term, adopted in many languages, especially in intellectual and institutional circles, for the anniversary of the founding ("legal or statutory birth") of an institution, such as an alma mater (college or other school). In ancient Rome, the [dies] Aquilae natalis was the "birthday of the eagle", the anniversary of the official founding of a legion.

Anniversaries of nations are usually marked by the number of years elapsed, expressed with Latin words or Roman numerals.

=== Numerical ===
Latin terms for anniversaries are mostly straightforward, particularly those relating to the first thirty years (1–30), or multiples of ten years (30, 40, 50, 60, 70 etc.), or multiples of centuries or millennia (100, 200, 300, 1000, 2000, 3000, etc.). In these instances, the name of the anniversary is generally derived from the Latin word(s) for the respective number of years. When anniversaries relate to fractions of centuries (125, 150, 175, 225, 250, 275 years—i.e. 1.25, 1.5, 1.75, 2.25, 2.5, and 2.75 centuries), the situation is not as simple.

Roman fractions were based on a duodecimal system. From 1/12 to 8/12 they were expressed as multiples of twelfths (uncia "twelfth"; the source of the English words inch and ounce) and from 9/12 to 11/12 they were expressed as multiple twelfths less than the next whole unit—i.e. a whole unit less 3/12, 2/12 or 1/12 respectively. There were also special terms for quarter (quadrans), half (semis), and three-quarters (dodrans). Dodrans is a Latin contraction of de-quadrans which means "a whole unit less a quarter" (de means "from"; quadrans means "quarter"). Thus for the example of 175 years, the term is a quarter century less than the next whole (bi)century or 175 = (−25 + 200).

In Latin, it seems that this rule did not apply precisely for 1 1/2. While secundus is Latin for "second", and bis for "twice", these terms are not used such as in sesqui-secundus. Instead sesqui (or ses) is used by itself.

Anniversary	Latin-derived term	Other terms	Comments
6 months	Semiannual		'Biannual' means twice in a year, or a malapropism meaning once every two years ('biennial').
6 months	Biannual		'Biannual' means twice in a year, or a malapropism meaning once every two years ('biennial').
1 year	Annual	Paper	
2 years	Biennial	Cotton	'Biennial' means once every two years, or a malapropism meaning twice in a year ('biannual').
3 years	Triennial	Leather	
4 years	Quadrennial	Linen	
5 years	Quinquennial	Wood	
6 years	Sexennial	Iron	Sexennial and sextennial are two different forms of the same word.
6 years	Sextennial	Iron	Sexennial and sextennial are two different forms of the same word.
7 years	Septennial	Wool	
8 years	Octennial	Bronze	
9 years	Novennial	Copper	
10 years	Decennial	Tin	
10 years	Decennial	Aluminum	
11 years	Undecennial	Steel	
12 years	Duodecennial	Silk	
12 1/2 years (150 months)	Semiquadranscentennial; Semiquinvigintennial	Parsley	A humorous or mock wedding anniversary celebrated in Northern Germany and the Netherlands, chosen because it is halfway to the silver anniversary.
13 years	Tredecennial	Lace	
14 years	Quattuordecennial	Ivory	
15 years	Quindecennial	Crystal	
16 years	Sedecennial	Sapphire	Sapphire is separately used for other anniversaries
16 years	Sexdecennial	Sapphire	Sapphire is separately used for other anniversaries
17 years	Septendecennial	Orchid	
18 years	Octodecennial	Quartz	
19 years	Novemdecennial, novendecennial	Jade	
20 years	Vigintennial; Vicennial; Bidecennial	China; Porcelain; Emerald	
25 years	Quadranscentennial	Silver	
25 years	Quinvigintennial	Silver	
30 years	Trigintennial	Pearl	
30 years	Tricennial	Pearl	
35 years	Quintricennial	Coral	
40 years	Quadragennial	Ruby	
45 years	Quinquadragennial	Sapphire	
50 years	Semicentennial	Golden	Previously, "jubilee" by itself was used to indicate celebrations at 50 year intervals
55 years	Quinquinquagennial	Emerald	
55 years	Quinquinquagenary	Emerald	
60 years	Sexagennial	Diamond	Diamond is separately used for the 75th anniversary, its use for 60th years being popularized by Diamond Jubilee of Queen Victoria
60 years	Sexagenary	Diamond	Diamond is separately used for the 75th anniversary, its use for 60th years being popularized by Diamond Jubilee of Queen Victoria
65 years	Quinsexagennial	Sapphire	Sapphire is separately used for other anniversaries
70 years	Septuagennial	Platinum	
70 years	Septuagenary	Platinum	
75 years	Semisesquicentennial	Diamond	Diamond is separately used for the 60th anniversary. Semisesquicentennial can be broken down to understand its meaning: "semi" - half of + "sesqui" - in the ratio of 3:2 + "centennial" - 100 years. Broken out mathematically, 1/2 * 3/2 * 100 = 75.
75 years	Demisesquicentennial	Diamond	Diamond is separately used for the 60th anniversary. Semisesquicentennial can be broken down to understand its meaning: "semi" - half of + "sesqui" - in the ratio of 3:2 + "centennial" - 100 years. Broken out mathematically, 1/2 * 3/2 * 100 = 75.
80 years	Octogintennial	Oak	
80 years	Octogenary	Oak	
90 years	Nonagintennial	Granite	
90 years	Nonagenary	Granite	
100 years	Centennial	Obsidian	
100 years	Centenary	Obsidian	
125 years	Quasquicentennial		Term is broken down as quasqui- (and a quarter) centennial (100 years). Quasqui is a contraction from quadrans "a quarter" plus the clitic conjunction -que "and". The term was coined by Funk and Wagnalls editor Robert L. Chapman in 1961.
150 years	Sesquicentennial		Term broken down as sesqui- (and a half) centennial (100 years)
175 years	Dodransbicentennial		Dodrans is a Latin contraction of de-quadrans which means "a whole unit less a quarter" (de means "from"; quadrans means "quarter"). 175 years is a quarter century less than the next whole (bi)century (175 = 200 − 25).
175 years	Dodrabicentennial		Alternative Latin form of Dodransbicentennial
175 years	Dequasbicentennial		Alternative Latin form of Dodransbicentennial
175 years	Dosquicentennial		Dosquicentennial has been used in modern times and this is perhaps a modern contraction of "de-quadrans".
175 years	Demisemiseptcentennial		Probably a modern coined term: demisemiseptcentennial; literally one-half (demi-) × one-half (semi-) × seven (sept-) × 100 years (centennial)—also demisemiseptcentenary.
175 years	Quartoseptcentennial		Probably a modern coined term: quartoseptcentennial; literally one-quarter (quarto-) × seven (sept-) × 100 years (centennial)—also quartoseptcentenary.
175 years	Terquasquicentennial		A coined word for an anniversary of 175 years, but the elements of the word literally refer to an anniversary of 375 years, as follows: ter- (3) × quasqui- (1 1/4) × centennial (100 years)
175 years	Septaquintaquinquecentennial		Suggested by lexicographer Robert L. Chapman to William Safire; first appeared in Safire's column, "On Language" (The New York Times Magazine, February 12, 1995). It is a coined word for an anniversary of 175 years, but the elements of the word literally refer to an anniversary of 35,000 years, as follows: septaquinta- (70) × quinque- (5) × centennial (100 years)
200 years	Bicentennial		Used by the United States Bicentennial.
200 years	Bicentenary		Used by the United States Bicentennial.
225 years	Quasquibicentennial		
250 years	Sestercentennial		To express 2 1/2 in Latin it would be expressed as "half-three". The term relates to being halfway [from the second] to the third integer. In Latin this is "Sestertius", which is a contraction of semis (halfway) tertius (third)—hence Sestercentennial. Used by Dartmouth College in 2019.
250 years	Semiquincentennial		Semi- (half) × quin- (5) × centennial (100 years) = 250 years. Used by Brown University in 2015. Also used by the United States Semiquincentennial.
250 years	Bisesquicentennial		Bi- (two) + sesqui- (and a half) x centennial (100 years) = 250 years.
250 years	Bicenquinquagenary		Used by Princeton University in 1996, Reading, Pennsylvania in 1998, and Washington and Lee University in 1999. It is a coined word for an anniversary of 250 years: bi- (2) × cen(t)- (100) + quinquagenary (50 years).
250 years	Quarter-millennial		
275 years	Bicenterquasquigenary		
300 years	Tercentennial		
300 years	Tercentenary		
300 years	Tricentennial		
300 years	Tricentenary		
350 years	Sesquarcentennial		Sesquarcentennial is a modern coined term; sesquarcentennial for 350 years is deduced here from the "Sestertius" definition for 250 years above. For 350 years it relates to being halfway from the third to the fourth integer; thus a contraction of semis (halfway) and quartus (fourth); hence Sesquarcentennial. Semiseptcennial is probably a modern coined term: semi- (half) × sept (7) × cen(t)- (100) × centennial (350 years).
350 years	Semiseptcentennial		Sesquarcentennial is a modern coined term; sesquarcentennial for 350 years is deduced here from the "Sestertius" definition for 250 years above. For 350 years it relates to being halfway from the third to the fourth integer; thus a contraction of semis (halfway) and quartus (fourth); hence Sesquarcentennial. Semiseptcennial is probably a modern coined term: semi- (half) × sept (7) × cen(t)- (100) × centennial (350 years).
375 years	Terquasquicentennial		
400 years	Quadricentennial		
400 years	Quadricentenary		
400 years	Quatercentenary		
450 years	Sesquincentennial		
500 years	Quincentenary		
500 years	Quincentennial		
600 years	Sexacentennial		
600 years	Sexcentenary		
700 years	Septcentennial		Probably a coined term; earliest known use in March 1988. Chiang Mai Septcentennial Stadium (Chiang Mai, Thailand) was completed in 1991. Also mentioned in the 2008 animated film WALL-E, with a "Septuacentennial Cupcake in a Cup".
700 years	Septuacentennial		Probably a coined term; earliest known use in March 1988. Chiang Mai Septcentennial Stadium (Chiang Mai, Thailand) was completed in 1991. Also mentioned in the 2008 animated film WALL-E, with a "Septuacentennial Cupcake in a Cup".
800 years	Octocentennial		
800 years	Octocentenary		
900 years	Nonacentennial		
1000 years	Millennial		
1500 years	Sesquimillennial		Term broken down as sesqui- (one and a half) millennial (1000 years)
2000 years	Bimillennial		
3000 years	Trimillennial		
4000 years	Quadrimillennial		
5000 years	Quinmillennial		
6000 years	Sexamillennial		
7000 years	Septmillennial		
8000 years	Octomillennial		
9000 years	Nonamillennial		
10,000 years	Decamillennial		
100,000 years	Centamillennial		

== Symbols ==
Many anniversaries have special names. Etiquette in Society, in Business, in Politics and at Home by Emily Post, published in 1922, contained suggestions for wedding anniversary gifts for 1, 5, 10, 15, 20, 25, 50, and 75 years. Wedding anniversary gift suggestions for other years were added in later editions and publications; they now comprise what is referred to as the "traditional" list. Generally speaking, the longer the period, the more precious or durable the material associated with it.

There are variations according to some national traditions. There exist numerous partially overlapping, partially contradictory lists of anniversary gifts (such as wedding stones), separate from the "traditional" names. The concepts of a person's birthday stone and zodiac stone, by contrast, are fixed for life according to the day of the week, month, or astrological sign corresponding to the recipient's birthday.

== See also ==
- List of historical anniversaries
- Quinquennial Neronia
