= Platinum jubilee =

70th anniversary

A platinum jubilee is a celebration held to mark an anniversary. Among monarchies, countries and organizations, it usually refers to a 70th anniversary.

== Platinum jubilees ==
=== Monarchs ===
Portrait	Monarch (Note: Monarchs of sovereign states are highlighted in bold, where those who were sovereigns for part of their reigns are underlined and those who were constituent of another state are in italic.)	Accession day	Commemoration
	Afonso I, Count/King of Portugal	22 May 1112	1182
	John I, Landgrave of Leuchtenberg (now Bavaria, Germany)	23 November 1334	1404
	Henryk IX Starszy, Duke of Zagan (now Lubusz, Poland)	14 March 1397	1467
	Charles of Artois, Count of Eu (now Normandy, France)	16 June 1397	1467
	Bernard VII, Lord of Lippe (now North Rhine-Westphalia, Germany)	12 August 1429	1499
	John Louis, Count of Nassau-Saarbrücken (now Saarland, Germany)	19 October 1472	1542
	William IV, Princely count of Henneberg-Schleusingen (now Thuringia, Germany)	26 May 1480	1550
	Werner of Salm-Reifferscheid-Dyck (now North Rhine-Westphalia, Germany)	31 October 1559	1629
	Henry Frederick, Count of Hohenlohe-Langenburg (now Baden-Württemberg, Germany)	29 January 1628	1698
	Christian Augustus, Count Palatine of Sulzbach (now Bavaria, Germany)	14 August 1632	1702
	Louis XIV of France	14 May 1643	1713
	Maeda Tsunanori, Daimyō of Kaga Domain (now Chūbu region, Japan)	30 April 1645	1715
	Victor-Maurice, Count of Revello/Marquis of Senonches (now Piedmont, Italy)	2 July 1656	1726
	Heinrich XI, Prince Reuss of Greiz (now Thuringia, Germany)	17 March 1723	1793
	Eugen Erwein the Posthumous, Count of Schönborn-Heusenstamm (now Hesse, Germany)	27 January 1727	1797
	Charles Frederick, Grand Duke of Baden (now Baden-Württemberg, Germany)	12 May 1738	1808
	Carl August, Grand Duke of Saxe-Weimar-Eisenach (now Thuringia, Germany)	28 May 1758	1828
	Parashuramrao Shrinivas I, Pant Pratinidhi of Aundh (now Maharashtra, India)	30 August 1777	1847
	Itō Nagatomo, Daimyō of Okada Domain (now Chūgoku region, Japan)	17 July 1778	1848
	George William, Prince of Schaumburg-Lippe (now Lower Saxony, Germany)	13 February 1787	1857
	Bishan Chandra Jenamuni, Raja of Rairakhol (now Odisha, India)	13 March 1825	1895
	Mudhoji IV Rao Naik Nimbalkar, Raja of Phaltan (now Maharashtra, India)	7 December 1841	1911
	Karansinhji II Vajirajji, Thakur of Lakhtar (now Gujarat, India)	15 June 1846	1916
	Johann II, Prince of Liechtenstein	12 November 1858	1928
	Udai Pratap Nath Shah Deo, Zamindar of Chotanagpur (now Jharkhand, India)	9 July 1869	1939
	Bhagvat Singh, Maharaja of Gondal (now Gujarat, India)	14 December 1869	1939
	Maharaja Jagatjit Singh of Kapurthala (now Punjab, India)	3 September 1877	1947
	Sobhuza II of Swaziland (now Eswatini)	10 December 1899	1969
	Idris ibni Muhammad al-Qadri, Tunku Besar of Tampin	31 May 1929	1999
	Bhumibol Adulyadej of Thailand	9 June 1946	2016
	Elizabeth II, Queen of the United Kingdom and other Commonwealth realms	6 February 1952	2022

=== Sovereign states and dependent territories ===
Flag	Sovereign state or dependent territory (Note: Sovereign states are highlighted in bold, dependent territories are underlined, former countries are in italic and limited recognized states are unmarked.)	Independence or formation	Commemoration
	Japan	11 February 660 BC	590 BC
	Iran	550 BC	480 BC
	San Marino	3 September 301	371
	France	10 August 843	913
	Austria	17 September 1156	1226
	Thailand	1238	1308
	Ethiopia	1270	1340
	Andorra	8 September 1278	1348
	Switzerland	1 August 1291	1361
	Monaco	8 January 1297	1367
	Spain	20 January 1479	1549
	Sweden	6 June 1523	1593
	Russia	16 January 1547	1617
	Netherlands	26 July 1581	1651
	Bhutan	1616	1686
	Portugal	1 December 1640	1710
	Nepal	25 September 1768	1838
	United States	4 July 1776	1846
	United Kingdom	1 January 1801	1871
	Haiti	1 January 1804	1874
	Serbia	15 February 1804	1874
	Ecuador	10 August 1809	1879
	Colombia	20 July 1810	1880
	Mexico	16 September 1810	1880
	Chile	18 September 1810	1880
	Paraguay	14 May 1811	1881
	Venezuela	5 July 1811	1881
	Luxembourg	9 June 1815	1885
	Argentina	9 July 1816	1886
	Greece	25 March 1821	1891
	Peru	28 July 1821	1891
	Costa Rica	15 September 1821	1891
	El Salvador	15 September 1821	1891
	Guatemala	15 September 1821	1891
	Honduras	15 September 1821	1891
	Nicaragua	15 September 1821	1891
	Brazil	7 September 1822	1892
	Bolivia	6 August 1825	1895
	Uruguay	25 August 1825	1895
	Belgium	21 July 1831	1901
	New Zealand	6 February 1840	1915
	Dominican Republic	27 February 1844	1919
	Liberia	26 July 1847	1922
	Denmark	5 June 1849	1924
	Italy	17 March 1861	1931
	Liechtenstein	15 August 1866	1936
	Canada	1 July 1867	1937
	Cuba	10 October 1868	1938
	Germany	10 May 1871	1941
	Montenegro	13 July 1878	1948
	Qatar	18 December 1878	1948
	Philippines	12 June 1898	1968
	Guam, United States	10 December 1898	1968
	Puerto Rico, United States	10 December 1898	1968
	American Samoa, United States	2 December 1899	1969
	Australia	1 January 1901	1971
	North Macedonia	2 August 1903	1973
	Panama	3 November 1903	1973
	Norway	7 June 1905	1975
	Bulgaria	22 September 1908	1978
	South Africa	31 May 1910	1980
	Mongolia	29 December 1911	1981
	Taiwan	1 January 1912	1982
	Albania	28 November 1912	1982
	Ireland	24 April 1916	1986
	United States Virgin Islands, United States	31 March 1917	1987
	Finland	6 December 1917	1987
	Lithuania	16 February 1918	1988
	Estonia	24 February 1918	1988
	Georgia	26 May 1918	1988
	Armenia	28 May 1918	1988
	Azerbaijan	28 May 1918	1988
	Czech Republic	28 October 1918	1988
	Slovakia	28 October 1918	1988
	Poland	11 November 1918	1988
	Latvia	18 November 1918	1988
	Romania	1 December 1918	1988
	Ukraine	22 January 1919	1989
	Afghanistan	19 August 1919	1989
	Åland, Finland	7 May 1920	1990
	Turkey	29 October 1923	1993
	Vatican City	11 February 1929	1999
	Saudi Arabia	23 September 1932	2002
	Iraq	3 October 1932	2002
	Lebanon	22 November 1943	2013
	Iceland	17 June 1944	2014
	Belarus	3 July 1944	2014
	North Korea	15 August 1945	2015
	South Korea	15 August 1945	2015
	Indonesia	17 August 1945	2015
	Vietnam	2 September 1945	2015
	Syria	17 April 1946	2016
	Jordan	25 May 1946	2016
	Pakistan	14 August 1947	2017
	India	15 August 1947	2017
	Myanmar	25 January 1948	2018
	Sri Lanka	4 February 1948	2018
	Faroe Islands, Denmark	23 March 1948	2018
	Israel	14 May 1948	2018
	China	1 October 1949	2019
	Libya	24 December 1951	2021
	Egypt	23 July 1952	2022
	Laos	22 October 1953	2023
	Cambodia	9 November 1953	2023
	Morocco	18 November 1955	2025
	Cocos (Keeling) Islands, Australia	23 November 1955	2025
	Sudan	1 January 1956	2026
	Tunisia	20 March 1956	2026

=== Organizations ===
Portrait	Organization	Inauguration	Commemoration
	International Olympic Committee	23 June 1894	1964
	BBC	18 October 1922	1992
	Warner Bros. Pictures	4 April 1923	1993
	The Walt Disney Company	16 October 1923	1993
	Metro-Goldwyn-Mayer	17 April 1924	1994
	United Nations	24 October 1945	2015
	Disneyland Resort	17 July 1955	2025

The most recent monarch to celebrate a platinum jubilee is Queen Elizabeth II of the United Kingdom and the other Commonwealth realms in June 2022. The celebrations were delayed from the actual February anniversary and the ceremony occurred on a four-day Bank Holiday on 2 June 2022, as was announced earlier. Elizabeth II died on 8 September 2022, three months after the official celebrations in the Commonwealth took place.

The most recent country to celebrate a platinum jubilee is Tunisia in March 2026. The celebrations were held on 20 March.

A 75th anniversary can be referred to as a diamond jubilee occasionally, but that term is commonly used to refer to a 60th anniversary. An anniversary of 100 years is simply called a centenary.

== See also ==
- Wedding anniversary
- Hierarchy of precious substances
- List of longest-reigning monarchs
- List of current reigning monarchs by length of reign
