= 80th Birthday Wedding (Tamil tradition) =

Ceremony of life partners

The 80th Birthday Wedding (Tamil: எண்பதாம் திருமணம், translit. Enbatham Thirumanam) is a traditional milestone ceremony celebrated in Tamil culture when a man completes 80 years of age. During the event, the elderly couple renews their marriage vows in the presence of their children, grandchildren, and extended family. The celebration marks longevity and enduring companionship, taking place either at the family's residence or at a temple, most notably the (Amirthakadeswarar temple) in Thirukkadaiyur, Tamil Nadu.

== Background ==
Thirukkadaiyur temple

See also: Wedding anniversary

The ceremony is typically held either at the couple’s residence or at a Shiva temple. Among temple venues, the Amirthakadeswarar Temple in Thirukkadaiyur, Tamil Nadu, is widely associated with this custom. Beyond commemorating the couple's long-standing marital life, the occasion serves as a gathering for multiple generations of the family to participate in traditional rituals and seek blessings from the elders

== Significance ==
See also: Shashthipurti

The specific proceedings vary depending on family traditions, local customs, and the guidance of the officiating priest. When conducted according to traditional rites, the ceremony involves the chanting of sacred hymns, the consecration of ritual water vessels, and the renewal of marriage vows by the elderly couple.Many families travel to the Amirthakadeswarar, Abirami Temple in Thirukkadaiyur, Tamil Nadu,to observe this milestone. In Hindu mythology, this temple is associated with the legend of Markandeya, making it a traditional pilgrimage site for rituals related to longevity and well-being. Alternatively, the ceremony is hosted at the couple’s residence. For home-based celebrations, a temporary ceremonial pavilion ("pandal" in tamil) is erected to accommodate invited relatives and guests. Following the completion of the marriage renewal rites, younger family members seek the blessings of the couple, who distribute small gifts to the attendees. The event concludes with a traditional communal meal shared by all guests.

== See also ==
80th marriage couples and their family at Amirthakadeswarar temple Thirukkadaiyur

- Thirukkadaiyur
- Marriage
- Tamilar Marriage
- Hindu Marriage
