= Gothda =

Gothda or Gothra may refer to the following places in India :

- Gothda (Gothra), a village of the former Kamadhia State, in Eastern Kathiawar (Gujarat), which was turned into a zamindari jagir for the princely Mir family
- Gothra, a village in the Dhod tehsil of Sikar district, in Rajasthan
- Litter Gothra, a village and former mehwa (petty princely (e)state) in Pandu, Rewa kantha, Gujarat
