= Self-respect marriage =

Dravidian method of marriage

A Self-Respect marriage is a wedding conducted in the Tamil language, without consulting scriptures or horoscopes, without prioritizing rituals, and without ostentation.

== History ==
In India, among Hindus, marriages were traditionally arranged solely by the parents, often without the bride and groom even speaking to each other beforehand. These weddings were conducted by priests and involved numerous rituals. Such marriages imposed a subordinate status on the woman; she was bound to remain with her husband for life, regardless of any physical or mental infirmities he might possess. Periyar E.V. Ramasamy was the first to break these conventions by introducing the new "Self-Respect Marriage" system.

== Legislation ==
Arignar Anna, the then Chief Minister of Tamil Nadu, introduced a bill in the Tamil Nadu Legislative Assembly to amend the Hindu Marriage Act of 1955 (originally passed by the Indian Parliament). Following a debate, the bill was passed by both the Legislative Assembly and the Legislative Council; it was then sent to the President of India for assent, received that assent on January 17, 1968, and was published in the Gazette on January 20, 1968, thereby becoming law.

== See also ==
- Marriage
- Hindu marriage
- Tamilar marriage
