= Quinquennial Neronia =

Roman festival

The quinquennial Neronia was a massive Greek-style festival created by the Roman Emperor Nero. It consisted of three parts: first music, oratory and poetry, second gymnastics and the last horseriding.

These games followed a tradition set by Julius Caesar and Augustus of having celebratory games to mark the anniversary of their reign.

The Neronia were a quinquennial event, which in this case was not counted inclusively but exclusively as the event took place every five years. The first Neronia was held in 60, six years after Nero's accession in 54, the second in 65. Nero's death and damnatio memoriae prevented a third installment.
