= Sapphire jubilee =

65th anniversary

In 2017 and 2025, the term sapphire jubilee or blue sapphire jubilee was coined for the celebrations to mark the 65th anniversary of the reign of Queen Elizabeth II (see Sapphire Jubilee of Elizabeth II) and the independences of Nigeria and Somaliland. Previously, the sapphire wedding anniversary was understood to be the 45th, and this would be expected to carry over to regnal anniversaries as with silver, golden, and diamond jubilees.

== 65-year anniversaries in recent history ==
=== People ===
Notable person	Year of Sapphire Jubilee
King Louis XIV of France	1708
King Ferdinand III of Sicily	1824
Emperor Franz Joseph I of Austria-Hungary	1913
Prince Johannes II of Liechtenstein	1923
King Sobhuza II of Swaziland	1964
King Bhumibol Adulyadej (Rama IX) of Thailand	2011
Queen Elizabeth II of the United Kingdom and the other Commonwealth realms	2017

=== Sovereign states and dependent territories ===
Sovereign state or dependent territory	Year of Sapphire Jubilee
Japan	595 BC
San Marino	366
France	908
Austria	1221
Thailand	1303
Ethiopia	1335
Andorra	1340
Switzerland	1356
Monaco	1362
Spain	1544
Sweden	1588
Russia	1612
Netherlands	1646
Bhutan	1686
Portugal	1705
Nepal	1833
United States	1841
United Kingdom	1866
Haiti	1869
Serbia	1869
Ecuador	1874
Colombia	1875
Mexico	1875
Chile	1875
Paraguay	1876
Venezuela	1876
Luxembourg	1880
Argentina	1881
Greece	1886
Peru	1886
Costa Rica	1886
El Salvador	1886
Guatemala	1886
Honduras	1886
Nicaragua	1886
Brazil	1887
Bolivia	1890
Uruguay	1890
Belgium	1896
New Zealand	1905
Dominican Republic	1909
Liberia	1912
Denmark	1914
Italy	1926
Liechtenstein	1931
Canada	1932
Cuba	1933
Germany	1936
Montenegro	1943
Qatar	1943
Philippines	1963
Guam, United States	1963
Puerto Rico, United States	1963
American Samoa, United States	1964
Australia	1966
North Macedonia	1968
Panama	1968
Norway	1970
Bulgaria	1973
South Africa	1975
Mongolia	1976
Taiwan	1977
Albania	1977
Ireland	1981
United States Virgin Islands, the United States	1982
Finland	1982
Lithuania	1983
Estonia	1983
Georgia	1983
Armenia	1983
Azerbaijan	1983
Czech Republic	1983
Slovakia	1983
Poland	1983
Latvia	1983
Romania	1983
Ukraine	1984
Afghanistan	1984
Åland, Finland	1985
Turkey	1988
Vatican City	1994
Saudi Arabia	1997
Iraq	1997
Lebanon	2008
Iceland	2009
Belarus	2009
North Korea	2010
South Korea	2010
Indonesia	2010
Vietnam	2010
Syria	2011
Jordan	2011
Pakistan	2012
India	2012
Myanmar	2013
Sri Lanka	2013
Faroe Islands, Denmark	2013
Israel	2013
China	2014
Libya	2016
Egypt	2017
Laos	2018
Cambodia	2018
Morocco	2020
Cocos (Keeling) Islands, Australia	2020
Sudan	2021
Tunisia	2021
Ghana	2022
Malaysia	2022
Guinea	2023
Senegal	2025
Togo	2025
Somaliland	2025
Madagascar	2025
Congo, Democratic Republic of the	2025
Somalia	2025
Benin	2025
Niger	2025
Burkina Faso	2025
Ivory Coast	2025
Chad	2025
Central African Republic	2025
Congo, Republic of the	2025
Gabon	2025
Mali	2025
Cyprus	2025
Nigeria	2025
Mauritania	2025
Kuwait	2026
Sierra Leone	2026
Tanzania	2026

=== Organizations ===
Notable organization	Year of Sapphire Jubilee
International Olympic Committee	1959
BBC	1987
Warner Bros. Pictures	1988
The Walt Disney Company	1988
Metro-Goldwyn-Mayer	1989
United Nations	2010
Disneyland Resort	2020

== See also ==
- Hierarchy of precious substances
- List of longest-reigning monarchs
- List of current reigning monarchs by length of reign
- List of national independence days
- Wedding anniversary
