= List of longest-reigning monarchs =

Louis XIV, the longest-reigning sovereign monarch whose reign is verifiable by exact date

This is a list of the longest-reigning monarchs in history, detailing the monarchs and lifelong leaders who have reigned the longest, ranked by length of reign.

== Monarchs of sovereign states with verifiable reigns by exact date ==
The following are the 25 longest-reigning monarchs of states who were internationally recognised as sovereign for most or all of their reign. Roman emperors Constantine VIII and Basil II, reigning for 66 years in total (962–1028) and for 65 years in total (960–1025) respectively, are not included, because for part of those periods they reigned only nominally as junior co-emperors alongside senior emperors.

Regencies (and coregencies as a "senior" monarch) are not counted against monarchs, hence Louis XIV is listed first among the monarchs of sovereign states despite his mother Anne of Austria being his regent for eight years. A distinction is not made between absolute and constitutional monarchs, hence Elizabeth II is listed second despite being a figurehead her entire reign.

The currently living longest-reigning monarch, Hassanal Bolkiah of Brunei, who began his reign on 5 October 1967, is not included on the list because Brunei was not a sovereign state until 1 January 1984.

No.	Portrait	Name	State	Reign		Duration		Ref.
No.	Portrait	Name	State	From	To	(days)	(years, days)	Ref.
1		Louis XIV	France	14 May 1643	1 September 1715	26,407	72 years, 110 days	
2		Elizabeth II	United Kingdom; Canada; Australia; New Zealand; (Note: Elizabeth was Queen of many other states, but other than these four, her reign was shorter. Lengths listed below are for Elizabeth as monarch of an independent country or dominion; except for Jamaica for which she would rank 17th, none would entitle her to a place on this list. The following states were British dominions at the start of Queen Elizabeth II's reign in 1952, but became independent as republics during her reign: Pakistan (including Bangladesh) (republic 23 March 1956; 4 years, 46 days); South Africa (republic 31 May 1961; 9 years, 114 days); Ceylon (republic, with the name Sri Lanka, 22 May 1972; 20 years, 106 days); The following states were not sovereign at the start of Queen Elizabeth II's reign in 1952, but became sovereign and later became republics during her reign: Ghana (sovereign 6 March 1957, republic 1 July 1961; 4 years, 87 days); Nigeria (sovereign 1 October 1960, republic 1 October 1963; 3 years, 0 days); Sierra Leone (sovereign 27 April 1961, republic 19 April 1971; 9 years, 357 days); Tanganyika (sovereign 9 December 1961, republic 9 December 1962; 1 year, 0 days); Trinidad and Tobago (sovereign 31 August 1962, republic 1 August 1976; 13 years, 336 days); Uganda (sovereign 9 October 1962, republic 9 October 1963; 1 year, 0 days); Kenya (sovereign 12 December 1963, republic 12 December 1964; 1 year, 0 days); Malawi (sovereign 6 July 1964, republic 6 July 1966; 2 years, 0 days); Malta (sovereign 21 September 1964, republic 13 December 1974; 10 years, 83 days); The Gambia (sovereign 18 February 1965, republic 24 April 1970; 5 years, 65 days); Guyana (sovereign 26 May 1966, republic 23 February 1970; 3 years, 273 days); Barbados (sovereign 30 November 1966, republic 30 November 2021; 55 years, 0 days); Mauritius (sovereign 12 March 1968, republic 12 March 1992; 24 years, 0 days); Fiji (sovereign 10 October 1970, republic 6 October 1987; 16 years, 361 days); The following states were not sovereign at the start of Queen Elizabeth II's reign in 1952, but became sovereign during her reign and retained her as Queen: Jamaica (sovereign 6 August 1962; 60 years, 33 days); Bahamas (sovereign 10 July 1973; 49 years, 60 days); Grenada (sovereign 7 February 1974; 48 years, 213 days); Papua New Guinea (sovereign 16 September 1975; 46 years, 357 days); Solomon Islands (sovereign 7 July 1978; 44 years, 63 days); Tuvalu (sovereign 1 October 1978; 43 years, 342 days); Saint Lucia (sovereign 22 February 1979; 43 years, 198 days); Saint Vincent and the Grenadines (sovereign 27 October 1979; 42 years, 316 days); Belize (sovereign 21 September 1981; 40 years, 352 days); Antigua and Barbuda (sovereign 1 November 1981; 40 years, 311 days); Saint Kitts and Nevis (sovereign 19 September 1983; 38 years, 354 days); In addition to the above, the colony of Rhodesia unilaterally declared independence in 1965 and retained Elizabeth II as its queen until 1970, when it reconstituted as the Republic of Rhodesia (later Zimbabwe Rhodesia in 1979). The state was never internationally recognized and was eventually reannexed by the United Kingdom in 1979 as a reestablished Southern Rhodesia under a provisional government, with Elizabeth II as its queen. In 1980, the country was granted independence as the internationally recognized Republic of Zimbabwe.)	6 February 1952	8 September 2022	25,782	70 years, 214 days (Note: Length of reign applies to the independent states that have remained monarchies since her accession: Australia, Canada, New Zealand, and the United Kingdom.)	
3		Rama IX	Thailand	9 June 1946	13 October 2016	25,694	70 years, 126 days	
4		Johann II	Liechtenstein	12 November 1858	11 February 1929	25,658	70 years, 91 days	
5		Kʼinich Janaabʼ Pakal I	Palenque	27 July 615 (Note: In the Mayan calendar, acceded 9.9.2.4.8, 5 Lamat 1 Mol; died 9.12.11.5.18, 6 Etz'nab 11 Yax. Long Count dates are converted using the GMT+2 correlation and the Julian Calendar.)	29 August 683	24,870	68 years, 33 days	
6		Franz Joseph I	Austrian Empire (1848–1867); Austria-Hungary (1867–1916)	2 December 1848	21 November 1916	24,825	67 years, 355 days	
7		Chan Imix Kʼawiil	Copán	5 February 628 (Note: In the Maya calendar, acceded 9.9.14.17.5, 6 Chikchan 18 K'ayab; died 9.13.3.5.7 12 Manik' 0 Yaxk'in. Western date is given by the GMT+2 correlation in the Julian Calendar.)	15 June 695	24,602	67 years, 130 days	
8		Ramesses II	New Kingdom of Egypt	31 May 1279 BC (Note: In the Egyptian calendar, acceded on Year 1, III Shemu (11th month), day 27; died on Year 67, II Akhet (2nd month), day 6.)	27 July 1213 BC	24,180	66 years, 74 days	
9		Ferdinand III	Sicily (1759–1816) (Note: During the same time period, he was also King of Naples from 1759 to 1799, 1799 to 1806, and 1815 to 1816); Two Sicilies (1816–1825)	6 October 1759	4 January 1825	23,831	65 years, 90 days	
10		Victoria	United Kingdom	20 June 1837	22 January 1901	23,226	63 years, 216 days	
11		James I	Aragon	12 September 1213	27 July 1276	22,964	62 years, 319 days	
12		Hirohito (Note: Posthumous name Shōwa is used in Japan.)	Empire of Japan (1926–1947); Japan (1947–1989)	25 December 1926 (Note: Served as regent (sesshō) for his father Emperor Taishō, from 29 November 1921 until his formal accession.)	7 January 1989	22,659	62 years, 13 days	
13		Kangxi Emperor (Note: Longest de jure ruler of China, although the Qianlong Emperor held longer de facto power.)	Qing (China)	5 February 1661	20 December 1722	22,597	61 years, 318 days	
14		Itzamnaaj Bahlam III (Note: Sometimes called "Itzamnaaj Bahlam II", or "Shield Jaguar".)	Yaxchilan	20 October 681 (Note: In the Maya calendar, acceded 9.12.9.8.1 5 Imix 4 Mak; died 9.15.10.17.14 6 Ix 12 Yaxk'in. Western date is given by the GMT+2 correlation in the Julian Calendar.)	15 June 742	22,153	60 years, 238 days	
15		Kʼakʼ Tiliw Chan Yopaat	Quiriguá	29 December 724 (Note: In the Maya calendar, acceded 9.14.13.4.17 12 Kab'an 5 K'ayab'; died 9.17.14.13.2 11 Ik 5 Yax. Western date is given by the GMT+2 correlation in the Julian Calendar.)	27 July 785	22,125	60 years, 210 days	
16		Qianlong Emperor (Note: Longest de facto ruler of China, although the Kangxi Emperor held longer de jure power.)	Qing (China)	18 October 1735	9 February 1796 (Note: Abdicated, but maintained de facto power as Emperor Emeritus until 7 February 1799.)	22,029	60 years, 114 days	
17		Christian IV	Denmark–Norway	4 April 1588	28 February 1648	21,879	59 years, 330 days	
18		Mary Teresa	Massa and Carrara (Italy) (Note: Massa and Carrara was de jure independent to the Holy Roman Empire since 1648.)	18 August 1731	29 December 1790	21,683	59 years, 133 days	
19		George III	Electorate of Hanover (1760–1814); Kingdom of Hanover (1814–1820) (Note: The Electorate of Hanover (formally known as the "Electorate of Brunswick-Lunenburg") was reformed as the rump Kingdom of Westphalia in 1807, which was not recognized by George III's government, before being reestablished as the Kingdom of Hanover in 1814 by the Congress of Vienna.); Great Britain (1760–1800); Ireland (1760–1800); United Kingdom (Note: Great Britain and Ireland were joined as the United Kingdom effective 1 January 1801 by the Acts of Union 1800.) (1801–1820)	25 October 1760	29 January 1820	21,644	59 years, 96 days	
20		Honoré III	Monaco (Note: Monaco was de jure independent to the Kingdom of France since 1641.)	7 November 1733	19 January 1793	21,617	59 years, 73 days	
21		Louis XV	France	1 September 1715	10 May 1774	21,436	58 years, 251 days	
22		Pedro II	Brazil	7 April 1831	15 November 1889	21,407	58 years, 222 days	
23		Al-Mustansir Billah	Fatimid Caliphate	13 June 1036 (Note: In the Islamic calendar, acceded on 15th Shaban 427; died 18th Zilhaja 487. His death date is sometimes given as 6 January 1095, but most sources give 29 December 1094.)	29 December 1094	21,383	58 years, 199 days	
24		Nicholas I	Principality of Montenegro (1860–1910) (Note: Montenegro was de jure independent to the Ottoman Empire until 1878); Kingdom of Montenegro (1910–1918)	13 August 1860	26 November 1918	21,288	58 years, 105 days	
25		Wilhelmina	Netherlands	23 November 1890	4 September 1948	21,104	57 years, 286 days	

== Monarchs of dependent or constituent states with verifiable reigns by exact date ==
The table below contains 100 monarchs of states that were not independent sovereigns for at least a portion of their reigns.

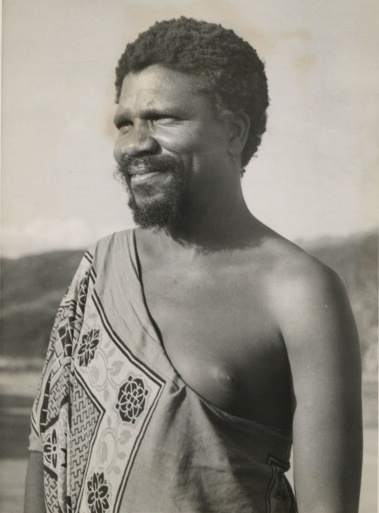
Sobhuza II, the longest-reigning monarch ever whose reign is verifiable by exact date

No.	Portrait	Name	State	Reign		Duration		Ref.
No.	Portrait	Name	State	From	To	(days)	(years, days)	Ref.
1		Sobhuza II (Note: He was proclaimed king at the age of four months, and his grandmother, Labotsibeni Mdluli, acted as regent until 22 December 1921 and then formally transferred all monarchial power to Sobhuza II. Some sources take the date of succession as the date on which his grandmother handed over the royal duties to him, not when he was proclaimed king. Swaziland became independent from the United Kingdom in 1968.)	Swaziland (British protectorate until 1968)	10 December 1899	21 August 1982	30,204	82 years, 254 days (Note: If counting only his time as monarch of a non-sovereign state, which came to an end on 6 September 1968, the length of his reign would be 68 years, 271 days.)	
2		Bernhard VII	Lippe (part of Holy Roman Empire)	11 August 1429	2 April 1511	29,819	81 years, 234 days	
3		Udai Pratap Nath Shah Deo	Chotanagpur (part of British Raj until 1947, and part of India from 1950)	9 July 1869	21 September 1950	29,658	81 years, 74 days	
4		Maeda Tsunanori	Kaga Domain (part of Tokugawa shogunate, Japan)	30 April 1645	29 June 1724 (Note: Formally "abdicated" on 6 May 1723 but officially continued to rule until his death on 29 June 1724 after which point his son Maeda Yoshinori assumed full power.)	28,914	79 years, 60 days	
5		William IV	Henneberg-Schleusingen (part of Holy Roman Empire)	26 May 1480	24 January 1559	28,732	78 years, 243 days	
6		Karansinhji II Vajirajji	Lakhtar State (Note: Part of British East India Company until 1858, British Raj from 1858.)	15 June 1846	8 August 1924	28,543	78 years, 54 days	
7		Heinrich XI (Note: Heinrich XI succeeded to the throne as Count of Reuss-Obergreiz in 1723 on the death of his brother, Heinrich IX (all male members of the family were named Heinrich in order of birth, even across cousins). In 1778 he became the first Prince of Reuss Elder Line.)	Reuss-Obergreiz d (part of Holy Roman Empire)	17 March 1723	28 June 1800	28,227	77 years, 103 days	
8		Idrus ibni Muhammad Al-Qadri	Tampin (Negeri Sembilan, Malaysia) (part of British Malaya until 1957)	31 May 1929	26 December 2005	27,968	76 years, 209 days	
9		Christian Augustus	Palatinate-Sulzbach (part of Holy Roman Empire)	14 August 1632	23 April 1708	27,635	75 years, 243 days	
10		Bishan Chandra Jenamuni	Rairakhol State	13 March 1825	10 June 1900	27,482	75 years, 89 days	
11		Charles I	Eu (part of France)	16 June 1397	25 July 1472	27,433	75 years, 39 days	
12		Mudhoji IV Rao Naik Nimbalkar	Phaltan State	7 December 1841	17 October 1916	27,342	74 years, 315 days	
13		Eugen Erwein the Posthumous	Schönborn-Heusenstamm (part of Holy Roman Empire)	27 January 1727	25 July 1801	27,207	74 years, 179 days	
14		Bhagvatsingh Sahib	Gondal State (part of British Raj)	14 December 1869	10 March 1944	27,114	74 years, 87 days	
15		George William	Schaumburg-Lippe (Note: Part of Holy Roman Empire until 1806, from 1815 part of the German Confederation.) (Note: Ruled as Count until 1807, as Prince thereafter.)	13 February 1787	21 November 1860	26,944	73 years, 282 days	
16		Afonso I Henriques	County of Portugal (part of Kingdom of León) (1112–1139); Kingdom of Portugal (1139–1185)	22 May 1112 (Note: In co-reign with his mother, Theresa, until 1128. Portugal gained independence from Leon in 1139. His tenure as king of Portugal was 46 years, 133 days.)	6 December 1185	26,861	73 years, 198 days	
17		Charles Frederick	Baden (part of Holy Roman Empire until 1806)	12 May 1738	10 June 1811	26,691	73 years, 29 days	
18		John I	Leuchtenberg (part of Holy Roman Empire)	23 November 1334	2 December 1407	26,671	73 years, 9 days	
19		John III Louis	Nassau-Saarbrücken (part of Holy Roman Empire)	19 October 1472	4 June 1545	26,526	72 years, 228 days (Note: Count John Louis was born after the death of his father Count Johann II on 25 July 1472; he succeeded to the throne at birth.)	
20		Itō Nagatomo	Okada Domain (part of Tokugawa shogunate, Japan)	17 July 1778	19 July 1850	26,299	72 years, 2 days	
21		Henry Frederick	Hohenlohe-Langenburg (part of Holy Roman Empire)	29 January 1628	2 June 1699	26,057	71 years, 124 days	
22		Victor-Maurice	Revello and Senonches (part of Holy Roman Empire)	2 July 1656	4 August 1727	25,964	71 years, 33 days	
23		Jagatjit Singh	Kapurthala State (part of British Raj)	3 September 1877	20 August 1948	25,918	70 years, 352 days (Note: Acceded to the Union of India on 15 August 1947. Merged Kapurthala into the Patiala and Eastern Punjab States Union (PEPSU) on 5 May 1948, relinquished his sovereign powers with effect from 20 August. Rajpramukh of the PEPSU from 5 May 1948 until his death on 17 June 1949)	
24		Parashuramrao Shrinivas I	Aundh State (part of Maratha Empire, later British East India Company)	30 August 1777	11 June 1848	25,852	70 years, 286 days	
25		Henryk IX Starszy	Żagań-Głogów (part of Bohemia)	14 March 1397	11 November 1467	25,809	70 years, 242 days	
26		Werner von Salm-Reifferscheidt	Salm-Reifferscheid (part of Holy Roman Empire)	31 October 1559	16 December 1629	25,614	70 years, 46 days	
27		Karl I August	Saxe-Weimar-Eisenach (Note: Part of Holy Roman Empire until 1806, from 1815 part of the German Confederation.)	28 May 1758	14 June 1828	25,584	70 years, 17 days	
28		George I	Anhalt-Dessau (part of Holy Roman Empire)	19 January 1405	21 September 1474	25,447	69 years, 245 days	
29		Alberico I	Massa and Carrara (part of Holy Roman Empire)	15 June 1553	18 January 1623	25,409	69 years, 207 days	
30		Reinhard III	Leiningen-Westerburg-Schaumburg (part of Holy Roman Empire)	8 April 1586	14 October 1655	25,391	69 years, 189 days	
31		Sanada Yukimichi	Matsuhiro Domain (part of Tokugawa shogunate, Japan)	8 March 1658	15 July 1727	25,330	69 years, 129 days	
32		Heinrich Joseph Johann	Principality of Auersperg (part of Holy Roman Empire)	6 November 1713	9 February 1783	25,297	69 years, 95 days	
33		Frederick V (Holy Roman Emperor Frederick III)	Inner Austria (1424–1493); Lower Austria (1457–1493); Archduchy of Austria (1490–1493) (part of Holy Roman Empire)	10 June 1424 (Note: Succeeded as duke of Inner Austria in 1424 jointly with his brother Albert VI of Austria; inherited Lower Austria in 1457 and Further Austria in 1490. Was also crowned King of the Romans (King of Germany) in 1440 and Holy Roman Emperor in 1452.)	19 August 1493	25,272	69 years, 70 days	
34		George William	Palatinate-Zweibrücken-Birkenfeld (part of Holy Roman Empire)	16 December 1600	25 December 1669	25,211	69 years, 9 days	
35		Godefroy Maurice de La Tour d'Auvergne	Duchy of Bouillon (part of Holy Roman Empire, later France)	9 August 1652	26 July 1721	25,187	68 years, 351 days	
36		Frederick V	Hesse-Homburg (Note: Part of Holy Roman Empire until 1806, from 1815 part of the German Confederation.)	7 February 1751	20 January 1820	25,183	68 years, 347 days	
37		John Louis Volrad	Löwenstein-Wertheim-Virneburg (part of Holy Roman Empire)	31 March 1721	4 February 1790	25,147	68 years, 310 days	
38		Vikramatji Khimojiraj	Porbandar State	20 June 1831	21 April 1900	25,142	68 years, 305 days	
39		Krishnaraja Wodeyar III	Kingdom of Mysore (Princely state of British East India Company after 1831; British Raj after 1857)	30 June 1799	27 March 1868	25,107	68 years, 271 days	
40		Johann Friedrich	Castell-Rüdenhausen (part of Holy Roman Empire)	10 January 1681	23 June 1749	25,000	68 years, 164 days	
41		Chintaman Rao I Patwardhan	Sangli State (part of Maratha Empire, later British East India Company)	6 February 1783	15 July 1851	24,995	68 years, 159 days	
42		Otto II the One-Eyed	Brunswick-Göttingen (part of Holy Roman Empire)	13 November 1394	6 February 1463	24,922	68 years, 85 days	
43		Sawant Singh	Pratapgarh State (part of Maratha Empire, later British East India Company)	26 October 1775	5 January 1844	24,907	68 years, 71 days	
44		Christian Karl Reinhard	Leiningen-Dagsburg-Falkenburg (part of Holy Roman Empire)	3 November 1698	17 November 1766	24,850	68 years, 14 days	
45		Raja Ram Singh	Bundi State	14 May 1821	28 March 1889	24,790	67 years, 318 days	
46		Vakhatsinhji Meghrajji	Vallabhipura State (part of British Raj)	20 August 1875	5 June 1943	24,760	67 years, 289 days	
47		Malietoa Tanumafili II	Samoa	28 October 1939	11 May 2007	24,667	67 years, 195 days	
48		Ernest II	Oettingen-Wallerstein (part Holy Roman Empire)	14 October 1602	3 March 1670	24,612	67 years, 140 days	
49		Philip I	Lippe-Alverdissen (1613–1640); Schaumburg-Lippe (1640–1681) (part of Holy Roman Empire)	7 December 1613	10 April 1681	24,596	67 years, 124 days	
50		Henry III	Margraviate of Meissen (part of Holy Roman Empire)	18 February 1221	15 February 1288	24,468	66 years, 362 days	
51		Eleanor (Note: Eleanor was Duchess of Aquitaine in her own right, although medieval law dictated that her various husbands (Louis VII of France, Henry II of England) and sons (Richard I and John of England) reign with her jointly.)	Aquitaine (part of France)	9 April 1137	1 April 1204	24,464	66 years, 358 days	
52		Sulaiman Sharif ul-'Alam Shah	Sultanate of Serdang (part of Dutch East Indies, part of Indonesia since 1945)	20 December 1879	13 October 1946	24,403	66 years, 297 days	
53		Augustus	Anhalt-Plötzkau (part of Holy Roman Empire)	6 December 1586	22 August 1653	24,366	66 years, 259 days	
54		Amarsinhji Banesinhji (Note: Merged his state into the United State of Kathiawad on 15 February 1948, but lived until 28 June 1954.)	Wankaner State (part of British Raj)	12 June 1881	15 February 1948	24,353	66 years, 248 days	
55		Frederick I	Helfenstein-Wiesensteig (part of Holy Roman Empire)	7 April 1372	20 August 1438	24,240	66 years, 135 days	
56		Khengarji III	Cutch (part of British Raj)	19 December 1875	15 January 1942	24,133	66 years, 27 days	
57		Philip I	Brunswick-Grubenhagen (part of Holy Roman Empire)	15 August 1485	4 September 1551	24,125	66 years, 20 days	
58		William IV the Victorious	Brunswick-Lüneburg (part of Holy Roman Empire)	14 October 1416	25 July 1482	24,025	65 years, 284 days	
59		Leopold III	Anhalt-Dessau (part of Holy Roman Empire)	16 December 1751	9 August 1817	23,977	65 years, 236 days	
60		Charles Theodore	Palatinate-Sulzbach (1733–1742); County Palatine of the Rhine (1742–1799) (part of Holy Roman Empire)	20 July 1733	16 February 1799	23,952	65 years, 211 days	
61		Makino Tadakiyo	Nagaoka Domain (part of Tokugawa shogunate, Japan)	5 August 1766	17 August 1831	23,752	65 years, 12 days	
62		Obizzo I d'Este	Este and Ferrara (part of Holy Roman Empire)	15 December 1128	25 December 1193	23,751	65 years, 10 days	
63		Jean I	Duchy of Brittany (part of France)	21 October 1221	8 October 1286	23,728	64 years, 352 days	
64		Frederick William	Hohenzollern-Hechingen (part of Holy Roman Empire)	24 January 1671	14 November 1735	23,669	64 years, 294 days	
65		Johann Seyfried von Eggenberg	Eggenberg (part of Holy Roman Empire)	5 February 1649	5 November 1713	23,648	64 years, 273 days	
66		Gangadharrao II Patwardhan	Miraj Senior (part of British Raj)	6 June 1875	11 December 1939	23,563	64 years, 188 days	
67		Marguerite Charlotte	Ligny (part of France)	23 May 1616	16 November 1680	23,553	64 years, 177 days	
68		Marie II	County of Soissons (part of France)	25 October 1482	1 April 1547	23,534	64 years, 158 days	
69		Vishwanath Singh Bahadur	Chhatarpur State (part of British Raj)	4 November 1867	4 April 1932	23,527	64 years, 152 days	
70		Frederick II Magnus	Salm-Neuweiler (part of Holy Roman Empire)	26 October 1608	25 January 1673	23,467	64 years, 91 days	
71		Oda Nobuhisa	Obata Domain (part of Tokugawa Shogunate, Japan)	6 August 1650	17 August 1714	23,386	64 years, 11 days	
72		Ibrahim	Johor, Malaysia (part of British Malaya until 1957)	4 June 1895	8 May 1959	23,348	63 years, 338 days	
73		Sayajirao Gaekwad III	Baroda State (part of British Raj)	27 May 1875	6 February 1939	23,265	63 years, 256 days	
74		Albert Anton	Schwarzburg-Rudolstadt (part of Holy Roman Empire)	4 November 1646	24 June 1710	23,242	63 years, 232 days	
75		Anthony Günther	Duchy of Oldenburg (part of Holy Roman Empire)	12 November 1603	19 June 1667	23,230	63 years, 219 days	
76		Frederick Augustus I (Note: Frederick Augustus I was known as Frederick Augustus III before 1806.)	Saxony (Note: Part of Holy Roman Empire until 1806, from 1815 part of the German Confederation.)	17 December 1763	5 May 1827	23,149	63 years, 139 days	
77		Matilda	Tuscany (de jure part of Holy Roman Empire)	6 May 1052	24 July 1115	23,088	63 years, 79 days	
78		Johann Gerhard	Manderscheid-Gerolstein-Bettingen (part of Holy Roman Empire)	30 July 1648	5 October 1711	23,076	63 years, 67 days	
79		Ludwig I	Principality of Anhalt (part of Holy Roman Empire)	6 December 1586	7 January 1650	23,043	63 years, 32 days	
80		Isa bin Ali Al Khalifa	Bahrain (Note: Part of British protectorate from 1880)	1 December 1869	9 December 1932 (Note: Was forced to abdicate by the British in 1923 but the Bahrinis did not recognize this and considered him the rightful monarch until 1932.)	23,018	63 years, 8 days	
81		Charles III	Upper Lorraine (part of Holy Roman Empire)	12 June 1545	14 May 1608	22,972	62 years, 327 days	
82		Philip II	Isenburg-Birstein (part of Holy Roman Empire)	18 May 1533	5 April 1596	22,968	62 years, 323 days	
83		Johann Friedrich II	Hohenlohe-Neuenstein-Öhringen (part of Holy Roman Empire)	17 October 1702	24 August 1765	22,957	62 years, 311 days	
84		Philipp Ernst	Hohenlohe-Waldenburg-Schillingsfürst (part of Holy Roman Empire)	21 February 1697	29 November 1759	22,925	62 years, 281 days	
85		Bernhard II	Saxe-Meiningen (Note: Part of Holy Roman Empire until 1806, from 1815 part of the German Confederation.)	24 December 1803	20 September 1866	22,916	62 years, 270 days	
86		Saqr bin Mohammed Al Qasimi	Ras Al Khaimah (part of Trucial States until 1971, sovereign state 1971–1972, United Arab Emirates from 1972)	7 February 1948 (Note: Reigned in dispute with Sultan bin Salim Al Qasimi until 17 July 1948.)	27 October 2010	22,908	62 years, 262 days	
87		Philip II	Nassau-Weilburg (part of Holy Roman Empire)	2 July 1429	19 March 1492	22,906	62 years, 261 days (Note: Philipp II ruled as co-ruler with his brother till 1442 when they divided their inheritances.)	
88		Nicolas Leopold I	Salm-Hoogstraat (part of Holy Roman Empire)	6 June 1707	4 February 1770	22,889	62 years, 243 days	
89		Philip Joseph	Salm-Kyrburg (part of Holy Roman Empire)	16 October 1716	7 June 1779	22,879	62 years, 234 days	
90		Christian II	Palatinate-Birkenfeld-Bischweiler (part of Holy Roman Empire)	6 September 1654	26 April 1717	22,877	62 years, 232 days	
91		Hafiz Muhammad Ibrahim Ali Khan Bahadur	Tonk State (part of British Raj)	14 November 1867 (Note: Succeeded on 14 November 1867, but was officially enthroned on 20 December 1867)	23 June 1930	22,866	62 years, 221 days	
92		Léopold Philippe	Arenberg (part of Holy Roman Empire)	19 August 1691	4 March 1754	22,842	62 years, 197 days	
93		Rudolf I	Bregenz-Chur-Lower Raetia (part of Holy Roman Empire)	27 October 1097	27 April 1160	22,827	62 years, 183 days	
94		Hosokawa Tsunatoshi	Kumamoto Domain (part of Tokugawa shogunate, Japan)	28 January 1650	11 July 1712	22,809	62 years, 165 days	
95		Nahar Singh	Shahpura State (part of British Raj)	21 April 1870	24 June 1932	22,709	62 years, 64 days	
96		Chandrabhan Singh	Garrauli State (part of British Raj)	19 October 1884	20 November 1946	22,676	62 years, 32 days	
97		Heinrich XXV	Reuss-Gera Younger Line (part of Holy Roman Empire)	13 March 1686	13 March 1748	22,645	62 years, 0 days	
98		Johann Christian I	Eggenberg (part of Holy Roman Empire)	5 February 1649	14 December 1710	22,591	61 years, 312 days	
99		Christian Louis	Waldeck-Wildungen (part of Holy Roman Empire)	24 February 1645	12 December 1706	22,570	61 years, 291 days	
100		Tuanku Abdul Hamid Halim Shah	Kedah Sultanate (part of British Malaya)	22 September 1881	13 May 1943	22,512	61 years, 233 days	

== Monarchs whose exact dates of rule are unknown ==
These monarchs are grouped according to length of reign by year in whole numbers. Within each year-grouping, they appear alphabetically. In a given year, there may have been a wide array of actual reign lengths based on days. Thus, this table does not present a precise ranking by total length of reign. The list is limited to those that might reasonably be expected to lie within the range of those in the tables above, at minimum 57 years. Emphasised states were sovereign. Japanese legendary emperors, according to the ancient Japanese calendar, reigned for very long terms of 60–70 years each. The longest ruler of the legendary emperors, Emperor Kōan, was claimed to have reigned for about 101 years. These figures are not included in the table because they are regarded as inaccurate by modern scholars. For those, see Longevity myths. Rulers with both independent and dependent rules are combined.

Portrait	Name	Country	Reign		Duration (approx. years)	Ref.
Portrait	Name	Country	from	to	Duration (approx. years)	Ref.
	Min Hti	Launggyet Dynasty of Arakan (part of Myanmar)	1279	1374	95 years (disputed) (Note: Possibly reigned about 1295–1370.)	
	Pepi II Neferkare (Note: Pepi II's figure has been disputed by some Egyptologists who favour a shorter reign length of 64 years, given the absence of attested dates known for Pepi after his 31st Count, which would equate to 62 years assuming the count to be biennial. Others point, however, to the consistency between the existing historical sources all crediting Pepi with over 90 years of reign. Finally, the lack of evidence beyond his 62nd year does not preclude a much longer reign, especially in view of the decay of the Egyptian state into the chaos of the First Intermediate Period at the end of Pepi's reign.)	Egypt (Old Kingdom)	2278 BC	2184 BC (disputed)	94 years (disputed)	
	Taejo (Note: A dispute exists concerning when Taejo's reign ended. The Book of the Later Han cites 121 as his death date. The traditionally believed one is 146 since the Samguk Sagi claims that he abdicated in that year.)	Goguryeo (part of Korea)	53	146 (disputed)	93 years (disputed)	
	Tarak Bahadur Shah	Bhirkot (part of Nepal)	1912	6 March 2001	89 years	
	Nintoku (Note: While the chronology of his reign is disputed, his existence is generally accepted by most historians.)	Japan (Kofun period)	313 (disputed)	399 (disputed)	86 years (disputed)	
	Abd al-Muttalib	Quraysh (Mecca, Saudi Arabia)	c. 497	c. 578	81 years (disputed)	
	Sawai Basavalinga I Rajendra Udaiyar	Sundem (part of Portuguese India)	1763	1843	80 years	
	Ermanaric (Note: Some sources just give 80 years of lifespan not reign and Chronology disputed)	Oium (part of Ukraine)	296 (disputed)	376	80 years (disputed)	
	Hanayos	Hariphunchai (part of Thailand)	669 (Note: Other sources put his start date as 679 or 688.) (disputed)	749	80 years (disputed)	
	Jangsu	Goguryeo (part of Korea)	412	491	79 years	
	Sigismondo III	Este and San Martino in Rio (part of Holy Roman Empire)	1653	28 August 1732	79 years	
	An Dương Vương	Âu Lạc (part of Vietnam)	257 BC (disputed)	179 BC (disputed)	78 years (disputed)	
	Zalam Singh	Bidasar (part of Maratha Empire)	1727	1805	78 years	
	Abu'l-Jaysh Ishaq ibn Ibrahim	Ziyadid dynasty (part of Yemen)	904 (disputed)	981 (disputed) (Note: Some sources give the years of his reign as 911–981 (70 years).)	77 years	
	Azmat Tallah Khan	Rajouri (part of Mughal Empire)	1683	12 November 1760	77 years	
	Mirian III	Kingdom of Iberia (part of Georgia)	284 (disputed)	361 (disputed) (Note: The main source for his is life, The Georgian Chronicles, was written several centuries after his death.)	77 years	
	Raisingh Deo	Patna (part of Mughal Empire, later Maratha Empire)	1685	1762	77 years	
	Jadunath Singh Mangaraj	Khandpara (part of Mughal Empire)	1599	1675	76 years	
	John Philip I	Stadion (part of Holy Roman Empire)	1666	2 January 1742	76 years	
	Mulla Ismail	Dir (part of Mughal Empire)	1676	1752	76 years	
	William I the Elder	Sayn-Wittgenstein (part of Holy Roman Empire)	1494	18 April 1570	76 years	
	Raja Abhiram Singh	Saraikela (part of Maratha Empire, later British East India Company)	1743	1818	75 years	
	Sauromaces I	Kingdom of Iberia (part of Georgia)	234 BC (disputed)	159 BC (disputed)	75 years	
	Tai Wu	Shang dynasty (part of China)	1486 BC (disputed)	1411 BC (disputed)	75 years	
	Vakhtang I Gorgasali	Kingdom of Iberia (part of Georgia)	447 (disputed)	522 (disputed)	75 years	
	Uthiyan Cheralathan	Chera dynasty (part of India)	55 (disputed)	130	75 years	
	Johann III	Sponheim-Starkenburg (part of Holy Roman Empire)	1324	30 December 1398	74 years	
	Manik Rae	Sambhar (part of India)	720	794	74 years	
	Yo-Tha	Hariphunchai (part of Thailand)	1197	1271	74 years	
	Deria Hassan	Isaaq Sultanate (part of British Somaliland from 1884)	1870	1943	73 years	
	Sabal Singh	Bedla (part of Mughal Empire)	1608	1681	73 years	
	Tezozomoc	Azcapotzalco (part of Mexico)	1353 (disputed)	1426	73 years	
	Frederick Charles	Bentheim-Bentheim (part of Holy Roman Empire)	1731	19 February 1803	72 years	
	Gangesvara Anantvarman Chodaganga Deva	Eastern Ganga (part of India)	17 February 1078	1150	72 years	
	Grigor II	Syunik (part of Armenia)	1094	1166	72 years	
	Raja Sang Tawal (Abdullah)	Kelantan (part of Malaysia)	1267	1339	72 years	
	Arwa al-Sulayhi	Sulayhid Sultanate (part of Yemen, Fatimid Caliphate)	1067	5 May 1138	71 years	
	Heinrich VIII the Noble	Fürstenberg-Wolfach (part of Holy Roman Empire)	Late 1419	30 November 1490	71 years	
	Ngawang Tashi Drakpa	Phagmodrupa dynasty (part of Tibet, China)	1491; 1556	1554; 1564	71 years	
	Huan	State of Qi (part of China)	637 BC	567 BC	70 years	
	John III	Aarberg (part of Holy Roman Empire)	1427	1497	70 years	
	John Ulrich	Stadion (part of Holy Roman Empire)	1530 (Note: His start date is also sometimes given as 1537)	1600	70 years	
	Muhtarram Shah Kator I	Chitral (part of Mughal Empire)	1585	1655	70 years	
	Niandfo	Oubritenga (part of Nigeria)	1441	1511	70 years	
	Pandukabhaya	Kingdom of Anuradhapura (part of Sri Lanka)	437 BC	367 BC	70 years	
	Shapur II (Note: Shapur II was crowned in utero: the crown was placed upon his mother's belly. This child, named Shapur, was therefore born king; the government was conducted by his mother and the magnates.)	Sasanian Empire (Iran)	309	379	70 years	
	Tshudpud Namgyal	Kingdom of Sikkim (Note: Dominated by Nepal until 1816 and then by the British.)	1793	1863	70 years	
	Gerlach IV	Isenburg-Grenzau (1220–1258); Isenburg-Limburg (1258–1289) (part of Holy Roman Empire)	1220	1289	69 years	
	Henry VI	County of Gorizia (part of Holy Roman Empire)	6 May 1385	1454	69 years	
	Jai Chandra Katoch	Lambagraon-Kangra (part of British Raj)	1864	1933	69 years	
	Muhammad Mumtaz Ali Khan	Atraula (part of British Raj)	1865	1934	69 years	
	Rao Chandaji	Balunda (part of Mughal Empire)	1573	1642	69 years	
	Simon I	County of Lippe (part of Holy Roman Empire)	1275	10 August 1344	69 years	
	Alberto Azzo II	Margraviate of Milan and Este (part of Holy Roman Empire)	1029	20 August 1097	68 years	
	Bernard	Strzelce, Niemodlin, and South Poland (part of Holy Roman Empire)	21 October 1382	1450	68 years	
	Bhagirathi Birabara Harichandan	Talcher State (part of Maratha Empire, later British East India Company)	1778	1846	68 years	
	Himiko	Yamatai (part of Japan)	180	248	68 years	
	Muhammad Jiwa Zainal Adilin II	Kedah Sultanate (part of Malaysia)	1710	1778	68 years	
	Hkun Ti	Mongpawn (part of Myanmar)	1860	1928	68 years	
	Louis II	Stadion (part of Holy Roman Empire)	1260	1328	68 years	
	Malojirao III	Mudhol State (part of Maratha Empire)	1737	1805	68 years	
	Eberhard II	Arenberg (part of Holy Roman Empire)	1387	1454	67 years	
	Gopal Singha Dev II	Mallabhum State	1809	1876	67 years	
	Maha Singh	Jhabua State (part of Mughal Empire)	1610	1677	67 years	
	Mahmud Iskandar Shah	Perak (part of Malaysia)	1653	1720	67 years	
	Osman Mahamuud/ Uthman III ibn Mahmud	Majeerteen Sultanate (part of Italian Somaliland from 1889)	1860	29 September 1927	67 years	
	Sultan Abdul Kadir Moh Aidid	Sultanate of Gowa (part of Dutch East Indies)	1826	30 January 1893	67 years	
	Zalim Singh	Bhadri (part of Maratha Empire, later British East India Company)	1748	1815	67 years	
	Bhim Singh	Busi (part of British Raj)	1882	1 January 1948 (Note: Abdicated on 15 August 1947, with effects from 1 January 1948 following the dissolution of the British Raj but lived until 1963.)	66 years	
	Eberhard I	Katzenelnbogen Junior (part of Holy Roman Empire)	1245	23 August 1311	66 years	
	Jing	Song State (part of China)	517	451 (Note: Alternatively his death date is put as 469. Might have co-reigned with his son until 451)	66 years	
	Otto I	Baden-Hachberg-Sausenberg (part of Holy Roman Empire)	1318	1384	66 years	
	Purushottam Dev	Bastar State (part of India)	1468	1534	66 years	
	Robert I (Note: Robert I was in co-rule with his brother Edward II until 1352)	Duchy of Bar (part of Holy Roman Empire)	December 1344	12 April 1411	66 years	
	Togbi Amedor Kpegla I	Anlo Ewe (part of Ghana)	1840	22 January 1906	66 years	
	Zhao Tuo (Note: Historians debate whether he was a Chinese or Vietnamese ruler (named Triệu Vũ Đế))	Nanyue	203 BC	137 BC	66 years	
	Catherine de' Medici	Auvergne (part of France)	1524 (Note: Sometimes her aunt Anne de La Tour d'Auvergne's death is given as June 1524 or 16 June 1524 (see for example her French wikipedia article), though sources seem to be laking for such specific dates and so she remains here. If sources are found for 16 June, she can be moved into the second section with 64 years, 203 days as her reign length)	5 January 1589	66 years	
	Haydar Mohammad Khan Bahadur	Pathari State	1794	1859	65 years	
	Matilda I	Nevers (part of France)	1192	1257	65 years	
	Raja Miyan Syed Nuruddin Ali	Tarakote Raj	1804	21 January 1869	65 years	
	Raja Raj Ram Singh I	Sitamau State	1802	1867	65 years	
	Nandivarman II	Pallava Empire (India)	731	796	65 years	
	Pharnavaz I	Kingdom of Iberia (part of Georgia)	299 BC	234 BC	65 years	
	Zhao	Song State (part of China)	469 BC (Note: An alternate start date is put as being 451. Could have possibly co-ruled with his father since 469.)	404 BC	65 years	
	Albert V	Anhalt-Dessau (part of Holy Roman Empire)	19 January 1405	1469	64 years	
	Amoghavarsha	Rashtrakuta Empire (part of India)	814	878	64 years	
	Henry VI	Henneberg-Aschach-Römhild (part of Holy Roman Empire)	1292	1356	64 years	
	Khuman III	Udaipur State (part of India)	878	942	64 years	
	Mian Nigahi Chand	Alelal-Bijapur (part of Maratha Empire)	1732	1796	64 years	
	Udai Chand	Beja	1841	20 June 1905	64 years	
	Zhuang I	State of Qi (part of China)	794 BC	730 BC	64 years	
	Andrew I	Vitré (part of France)	1072	1135	63 years	
	Bagauda/Yakano	Kingdom of Kano (part of Nigeria)	998/999	1063/1064	63 years	
	Fahrettin Behramşah	Mengüjek (part of Turkey)	1162	1225	63 years	
	Ganapati Deva	Kakatiya dynasty (part of India)	1199	1262	63 years	
	George Frederick	Kirchberg (part of Holy Roman Empire)	1686	1749	63 years	
	Mahendra Singh Bahadur	Bhadawar	1839	1902	63 years	
	Mahmud III	Mali Empire	1496	1559	63 years	
	Pradip Shah	Garhwal Kingdom (part of Maratha Empire)	1709	1772	63 years	
	Raja Rampalji Bahadur	Kutlehar State (part of British Raj)	1864	22 November 1927	63 years	
	Sripurusha	Western Ganga (part of India)	725	788	63 years	
	Vijaya Sena	Sena dynasty (part of India)	1096	1159	63 years	
	Zombré	Wogodogo (part of Nigeria)	1681	1744		
	Bhola Bhima II	Gurjaradesa (part of India)	1178	1240	62 years	
	Georg II	Montfort-Pfannberg (part of Holy Roman Empire)	1482	May 1544	62 years	
	Gopal Lal	Kamta-Rajaula State	1812	23 October 1874	62 years	
	King Oldman	Miskito Nation (part of Nicaragua and Honduras)	1625	1687	62 years	
	Prithvi Shah	Garhwal Kingdom (part of Mughal Empire)	1552	1614	62 years	
	Tej Chand Rai	Bardhaman Raj (part of Bengal Subah, later British East India Company)	1770	1832	62 years	
	Abdul Jalilul Akbar	Brunei	1597	1659	61 years	
	Askia Hanga the Great	Dendi State (part of Niger)	1700	1761	61 years	
	Bhavsinhji I Ratanji	Bhavnagar State (part of Mughal Empire)	1703	1764	61 years	
	Cleomenes II	Sparta (part of Greece)	370 BC	309 BC	61 years	
	Donnchadh MacMurrough Kavanagh	Laighin (part of Ireland)	1417	1478	61 years	
	Hyeokgeose Geoseogan	Silla (part of Korea)	57 BC	4	61 years	
	Leon II	Abasgia (767–778), Abkhazia (778–828)	767	828	61 years	
	Peter II	Urgell (part of Catalonia, Spain)	1347	June 1408	61 years	
	Orontes III	Armenia	321 BC	260 BC	61 years	
	Otto I	Solms-Braunfels (part of Holy Roman Empire)	1349	1410	61 years	
	Rao Shri Vijayraj Singh	Sirohi (part of India)	1250	1311	61 years	
	Winnemar	Manderscheid (part of Holy Roman Empire)	1206	1267	61 years	
	Æscwine	Kingdom of Essex (part of England)	527	587	60 years	
	Adesida I	Kingdom of Akure (part of Nigeria)	22 June 1897	1957	60 years	
	Ali ibn Dawud I	Kilwa Sultanate (part of Tanzania)	1023	1083	60 years	
	Avinita	Western Ganga (part of India)	469	529	60 years	
	Cleopatra II	Egypt (Ptolemaic)	175 BC	115 BC	60 years	
	Kotokuhene Nana Attafua	Akyem Kotoku (part of Ghana)	1867	25 September 1927	60 years	
	Padam Singh Bundela	Jigni State (part of Mughal Empire)	1730	1790	60 years	
	Friedrich II	County of Castell (part of Holy Roman Empire)	1289	1349	60 years	
	Gerhard I the Elder	Schwarzburg–Hallermund (part of Holy Roman Empire)	1266	1326	60 years	
	Gopinath Birabara Harichandan	Talcher State (part of India)	1651	1711	60 years	
	Gusti Ngurah Agung II	Tabanan (part of Dutch East Indies)	Mid 1843	21 November 1903	60 years	
	Heinrich II	Salm-Blankenburg (part of Holy Roman Empire)	1301	1361	60 years	
	Hiero II	Syracuse (part of Sicily, Italy)	275 BC	215 BC	60 years	
	Henry I	Isenburg-Cleeberg (part of Holy Roman Empire)	1167	1227	60 years	
	Khingila I	Alchon Huns (part of India)	430	490	60 years	
	Kilhan	Dhundhar (part of India)	1216	1276	60 years	
	Mayadunne	Kingdom of Sitawaka (part of Sri Lanka)	1521	1581	60 years	
	Mölambo	Bubi Kingdom (part of Nigeria)	1700	1760	60 years	
	Mutasiva	Anuradhapura Kingdom (part of Sri Lanka)	367 BC	307 BC	60 years	
	Pawl	Kingdom of Glywysing (part of Wales)	480	540	60 years	
	Phromkuman	Singhanavati (part of Thailand)	1029	1089	60 years	
	Pravarsena I the Great	Vakataka (part of India)	275	335	60 years	
	Sophie	County of Bar (part of Holy Roman Empire)	1033	1093	60 years	
	Sri Pravarasena II	Alchon Huns (part of India)	530	590	60 years	
	Vanghoji II Rao	Phaltan State (part of Mughal Empire)	1570	1630	60 years	
	Bhaskara Ravi Manukuladithya	Kodungallur Chera (part of India)	962	1021	59 years	
	Kulashekara Alupendra I	Alupa dynasty	1156	1215	59 years	
	Bu Jiang	Xia dynasty (part of China)	1890 BC	1831 BC	59 years	
	David I Anhoghin	Tashir-Dzoraget (part of Armenia)	989	1048	59 years	
	Kulottunga I	Eastern Chalukyas, then Cholas	1061	1120	59 years	
	Harisingh Vidyadhara	Dhenkanal State (part of India)	1531	1590	59 years	
	Hu	State of Chen (part of China)	1045 BC	986 BC	59 years	
	John the Magnificent	Poitou (part of France)	1357	15 June 1416	59 years	
	Mohan Singh	Rajgarh (part of Mughal Empire)	1638	1697	59 years	
	Muhammad Bayazid Khan Bahadur	Jagir of Maler (1600–1657); Malerkotla (1657–1659) (part of Mughal Empire)	1600	1659	59 years	
	Nawab Asad Ali Khan	Basoda State	1800 1822 (Note: Had a interruption between 1818 and 1822 but later regained it in 1822, counting both of his periods he had a reign of 59 years.)	1817 1864	59 years	
	Konrad I the Scheerer	Tübingen (part of Holy Roman Empire)	1317	1376	59 years	
	Sri Tegin Shah	Turk Shahis/Kabul Shahis (part of Afghanistan)	680	739	59 years	
	William III	County of Toulouse (part of France)	978	30 September 1037	59 years	
	William IV	Jülich (part of Holy Roman Empire)	1219	1278	59 years	
	Wu Ding	Shang dynasty (part of China)	1250 BC	1191 BC	59 years	
	Bhaitai Dev	Bastar State	1410	1468	58 years	
	Gomani II Phillip (Note: Regent until 1921.)	Maseko (part of Malawi)	1896	12 May 1954	58 years	
	Guled Abdi	Isaaq Sultanate (part of Somaliland)	1750	1808	58 years	
	Harald I Fairhair	Norway	872	930	58 years	
	Henry II	Baden-Hachberg (part of Holy Roman Empire)	1231	1289	58 years	
	Henry II	Isenburg-Grenzau (part of Holy Roman Empire)	1220	29 September 1278	58 years	
	Mwezi IV Gisabo	Kingdom of Burundi (Note: Part of German East Africa from 1890.)	1850	1908	58 years	
	Nan	Zhou dynasty (part of China)	314 BC	256 BC	58 years	
	Nedum Cheralathan	Chera Dynasty (part of India)	130	188	58 years	
	Jit Sen	Suket (part of Mughal Empire)	1663	1721	58 years	
	Mulraj II	Jaisalmer State (part of Maratha Empire, later British East India Company)	1762	1820	58 years	
	Rajapala	Gurjara-Pratihara (part of India)	960	1018	58 years	
	Ramasimhadeva	Karnata (part of India)	1227	1285	58 years	
	Rudolph I	Saxe-Wittenberg (part of Holy Roman Empire)	1298	12 March 1356	58 years	
	Sayyid Mir Zulfikar Ali Khan	Kamadhia (part of British Raj)	21 August 1863	1921	58 years	
	Tuoba Liwei/Emperor Shenyuan	Tuoba Clan (part of China)	219	277	58 years	
	Yusa	Kingdom of Kano (part of Nigeria)	1136	1194	58 years	
	Bernhard I	Bentheim-Bentheim (part of Holy Roman Empire)	1364	2 November 1421	57 years	
	Qara Yuluk Uthman Beg	Aq Qoyunlu (part of Iran)	1378	1435	57 years	
	Birakesari Deva I Bhagirathi Deva	Khurda Kingdom (part of Maratha Empire)	1736	1793	57 years	
	Deria Sugulle Ainanshe	Habr Yunis Sultanate (part of Somaliland)	1797	1854	57 years	
	Jaswant Singh	Nabha (part of British East India Company)	1783	22 May 1840	57 years	
	Jing	Qi (part of China)	547 BC	490 BC	57 years	
	John II	Auxerre (part of France)	1304	1361	57 years	
	Pharasmanes I the Great	Kingdom of Iberia (part of Georgia)	1	58	57 years	
	Prithvi Chand	Baghal State (part of Mughal Empire)	1670	1727	57 years	
	Kori	Oyo Empire (part of Nigeria)	1300	1357	57 years	
	Mithridates VI	Pontus (part of Turkey)	120 BC	63 BC	57 years	
	Nasir al-Din Muhammad	Mihrabanid dynasty	1261	1318	57 years	
	Maredudd ap Tewdws	Kingdom of Dyfed (part of Wales)	740	797	57 years	
	Ramnarian Singh	Anandpur State (part of British Raj)	1871	1928	57 years	
	Sargon	Akkadian Empire (part of Iraq)	2272 BC	2215 BC	57 years	
	Sheikh Hamad bin Abdullah Al Sharqi	Fujairah (part of United Arab Emirates)	1879	31 December 1936	57 years	
	Sourigna Vongsa	Lan Xang (Laos)	1637	1694	57 years	
	Orontes I	Armenia	401 BC	344 BC	57 years	
	Vseslav II Bryachislavich (Note: He also ruled Russia for a brief period between 1068 and 1069.)	Polotsk (part of Belarus)	1044	1101	57 years	

== See also ==
- List of longest-living state leaders
- List of oldest living state leaders
- List of shortest-reigning monarchs
- List of state leaders by age
- Records of heads of state
- Gerontocracy
- Otto von Habsburg, pretender to the throne of Austria-Hungary for 89 years

== Sources ==
- Jürgen von Beckerath (1997). Chronologie des Pharaonischen Ägypten. Mainz am Rhein: Philipp von Zabern. ISBN 9783805323109.
- Rapp, Stephen H. (2014). The Sasanian World through Georgian Eyes: Caucasia and the Iranian Commonwealth in Late Antique Georgian Literature. Ashgate Publishing, Ltd. ISBN 978-1472425522.
