= Hierarchy of precious substances =

Cultural ranking based on value or merit

In popular culture, sets of precious substances may form hierarchies which express conventional perceived relative value or merit. Precious metals appear prominently in such hierarchies, but as they grow, gems and semi-precious materials may be introduced as part of the system. The sequences can provide interesting examples of the arbitrariness of semiotic signs.

== Traditional manifestations ==
Jubilees have a hierarchy of years:

Years	Precious Material	Example
25	Silver	Silver Jubilee
40	Ruby	Ruby Jubilee
50	Gold	Golden Jubilee
60	Diamond	Diamond Jubilee
65	Sapphire	Sapphire Jubilee
70	Platinum	Platinum Jubilee

Wedding anniversaries extend the jubilee hierarchy with various sequences of substances filling in many of the gaps between the same major milestones. In 2017 the 65th anniversary of the accession of Elizabeth II was widely referred to as her "sapphire jubilee" or more specifically as her blue sapphire jubilee (see Sapphire Jubilee of Queen Elizabeth II) but more traditionally the sapphire anniversary is considered to be the 45th. In general usage no precious stone is considered to outrank the diamond.

Ancient Greek mythic-cultural cosmology depicted a decline from a golden age to a silver age followed by an Iron Age. In some variants there is a Bronze Age, an interim between the Iron Age and Silver Age.

In Japan, the traditional Sho Chiku Bai ranking system has a hierarchy of pine (松, matsu), bamboo (竹, take), and plum (梅, ume). This is commonly used by restaurants to indicate how elaborate (and expensive) set meals are.

== Modern adaptations ==
The measurement of sales of popular music starts high relative to the wedding anniversary scale, concentrating on gold and platinum (see gold album). Likewise, credit card companies usually have a "gold card" and a "platinum card" (many formerly had a "silver card" then followed by a "gold card", but due to similarity in appearance between silver and platinum these were often discontinued with the rise in popularity of platinum as a precious metal).

Sports events have a well-established convention (introduced into the Olympic tradition at the 1904 Summer Olympics), of a hierarchy of medals: bronze medal • silver medal • gold medal. This presumably echoes conventional coinage systems, in which cheap bronze or copper denominations could aggregate to intermediate silver coins, then to gold money. The archetypal British designations (penny, shilling and pound) parallel and reflect this hierarchy.

Events-sponsorship in sport or in the arts may involve (for example) silver, gold and/or platinum sponsors.

Fantasy role playing games often have a hierarchy of materials, following the relative strengths of pre-modern metals, bronze, iron and steel, for example, at the lower end, and moving up through fantastic or legendary materials such as mithril and adamant.

Some multiplayer video games feature a hierarchy of players that uses precious metal names to distinguish the various levels of skill, often progressing from Bronze to Silver, to Gold, to Platinum, then to Diamond.

== See also ==
- Wedding anniversary#Celebration and gifts
