= Ruby jubilee =

40th anniversary

A ruby jubilee marks a 40th anniversary.

== Ruby jubilees of monarchs in recent history ==
Monarch	Year of Ruby Jubilee
Günther Friedrich Karl II, Prince of Schwarzburg-Sondershausen	1875
Emperor Pedro II of Brazil	1881
Frederick Francis II, Grand Duke of Mecklenburg-Schwerin	1882
Ernest II, Duke of Saxe-Coburg and Gotha	1884
King George Tupou I of Tonga	1885
George Victor, Prince of Waldeck and Pyrmont	1885
Franz Joseph I, Emperor of Austria & King of Hungary	1888
William III, King of the Netherlands & Grand Duke of Luxembourg	1889
Peter II, Grand Duke of Oldenburg	1893
Charles Alexander, Grand Duke of Saxe-Weimar-Eisenach	1893
Ernst I, Duke of Saxe-Altenburg	1893
Johann II of Liechtenstein	1898
Frederick I, Grand Duke of Baden	1898
Heinrich XXII, Prince Reuss of Greiz	1899
Frederick William, Grand Duke of Mecklenburg-Strelitz	1900
King Norodom of Cambodia	1901
King George I of Greece	1903
King Christian IX of Denmark	1903
Emperor Gojong of Korea	21 Jan 1904
King Leopold II of Belgium	1905
King Carol I of Romania	10 May 1906
George II, Duke of Saxe-Meiningen	1906
King Chulalongkorn (Rama V) of Siam	1908
Emperor Meiji of Japan	1908
King Alfonso XIII of Spain	1926
Queen Wilhelmina of the Netherlands	1930
King Sobhuza II of Swaziland	1939
King Victor Emmanuel III of Italy	1940
King Haakon VII of Norway	1945
King Gustaf V of Sweden	1947
Queen Sālote Tupou III of Tonga	1958
Charlotte, Grand Duchess of Luxembourg	1959
Emperor Showa of Japan	Dec 1966
Emperor Haile Selassie of Ethiopia	1970
Franz Joseph II of Liechtenstein	1978
King Bhumibol Adulyadej (Rama IX) of Thailand	1986
Prince Rainier III of Monaco	1989
Queen Elizabeth II of the United Kingdom and the other Commonwealth Realms	6 February 1992
King Hussein of Jordan	11 August 1992
King Tāufaʻāhau Tupou IV of Tonga	16 December 2005
Sultan Hassanal Bolkiah of Brunei	5 October 2007
Sultan Qaboos bin Said of Oman	23 July 2010
Queen Margrethe II of Denmark	14 January 2012
King Carl XVI Gustaf of Sweden	15 September 2013

== Ruby jubilees of sovereign states or dependent territories in recent history ==
Sovereign state or dependent territory	Year of Ruby Jubilee
Japan	600 BC
Iran	490 BC
San Marino	3 September 341
France	10 August 883
Ethiopia	1310
Andorra	8 September 1318
Switzerland	1 August 1331
Spain	20 January 1519
Sweden	6 June 1563
Russia	16 January 1587
Portugal	1 December 1680
United States	4 July 1816
United Kingdom	1 January 1841
Haiti	1 January 1844
Serbia	15 February 1844
Ecuador	10 August 1849
Colombia	20 July 1850
Mexico	16 September 1850
Chile	18 September 1850
Paraguay	14 May 1851
Venezuela	5 July 1851
Luxembourg	9 June 1855
Argentina	9 July 1856
Greece	25 March 1861
Peru	28 July 1861
Costa Rica	15 September 1861
El Salvador	15 September 1861
Guatemala	15 September 1861
Honduras	15 September 1861
Nicaragua	15 September 1861
Brazil	7 September 1862
Bolivia	6 August 1865
Uruguay	25 August 1865
Belgium	21 July 1871
New Zealand	6 February 1880
Dominican Republic	27 February 1884
Liberia	26 July 1887
Denmark	5 June 1889
Italy	17 March 1901
Liechtenstein	15 August 1906
Canada	1 July 1906
Cuba	10 October 1907
Montenegro	13 July 1918
Qatar	18 December 1918
Philippines	12 June 1938
Guam, United States	10 December 1938
Puerto Rico, United States	10 December 1938
American Samoa, United States	2 December 1939
Australia	1 January 1941
North Macedonia	2 August 1943
Panama	3 November 1943
Norway	7 June 1945
Bulgaria	22 September 1948
South Africa	31 May 1950
Mongolia	29 December 1951
Taiwan	1 January 1952
Albania	28 November 1952
Ireland	24 April 1956
United States Virgin Islands, the United States	31 March 1957
Finland	6 December 1957
Lithuania	16 February 1958
Estonia	24 February 1958
Georgia	26 May 1958
Armenia	28 May 1958
Azerbaijan	28 May 1958
Czech Republic	28 October 1958
Slovakia	28 October 1958
Poland	11 November 1958
Latvia	18 November 1958
Romania	1 December 1958
Ukraine	22 January 1959
Afghanistan	19 August 1959
Åland, Finland	7 May 1950
Vatican City	11 February 1959
Iraq	3 October 1972
Lebanon	22 November 1983
Iceland	17 June 1984
Belarus	3 July 1984
North Korea	15 August 1985
South Korea	15 August 1985
Indonesia	17 August 1985
Vietnam	2 September 1985
Syria	17 April 1986
Jordan	25 May 1986
Pakistan	14 August 1987
India	15 August 1987
Myanmar	25 January 1988
Sri Lanka	4 February 1988
Faroe Islands, Denmark	23 March 1988
Israel	14 May 1988
China	1 October 1989
Libya	24 December 1991
Egypt	23 July 1992
Cambodia	9 November 1993
Morocco	18 November 1995
Cocos (Keeling) Islands, Australia	23 November 1995
Sudan	1 January 1996
Tunisia	20 March 1996
Ghana	6 March 1997
Malaysia	31 August 1997
Guinea	2 October 1998
Senegal	4 April 2000
Togo	27 April 2000
Madagascar	26 June 2000
Congo, Democratic Republic of the	30 June 2000
Somalia	1 July 2000
Benin	1 August 2000
Niger	3 August 2000
Burkina Faso	5 August 2000
Ivory Coast	7 August 2000
Chad	11 August 2000
Central African Republic	13 August 2000
Congo, Republic of the	15 August 2000
Gabon	17 August 2000
Mali	22 September 2000
Cyprus	1 October 2000
Nigeria	1 October 2000
Mauritania	28 November 2000
Kuwait	25 February 2001
Sierra Leone	27 April 2001
Tanzania	9 December 2001
Samoa	1 June 2002
Burundi	1 July 2002
Rwanda	1 July 2002
Algeria	5 July 2002
Jamaica	6 August 2002
Trinidad and Tobago	31 August 2002
Uganda	9 October 2002
Kenya	12 December 2003
Malawi	6 July 2004
Malta	21 September 2004
Zambia	24 October 2004
Gambia	18 February 2005
Maldives	26 July 2005
Singapore	9 August 2005
Guyana	26 May 2006
Botswana	30 September 2006
Lesotho	4 October 2006
Barbados	30 November 2006
Yemen	30 November 2007
Nauru	31 January 2008
Mauritius	12 March 2008
Eswatini	6 September 2008
Equatorial Guinea	12 October 2008
Tonga	4 June 2010
Fiji	10 October 2010
Bangladesh	26 March 2011
United Arab Emirates	2 December 2011
Bahrain	16 December 2011
Bahamas	10 July 2013
Guinea-Bissau	24 September 2013
Grenada	7 February 2014
Mozambique	25 June 2015
Cape Verde	5 July 2015
Comoros	6 July 2015
São Tomé and Príncipe	12 July 2015
Papua New Guinea	16 September 2015
Angola	11 November 2015
Suriname	25 November 2015
Timor-Leste	28 November 2015
Seychelles	29 June 2016
Djibouti	27 June 2017
Solomon Islands	7 July 2018
Tuvalu	1 October 2018
Dominica	3 November 2018
Saint Lucia	22 February 2019
Marshall Islands	1 May 2019
Kiribati	12 July 2019
Saint Vincent and the Grenadines	27 October 2019
Vanuatu	30 July 2020
Belize	21 September 2021
Antigua and Barbuda	1 November 2021
Saint Kitts and Nevis	19 September 2023
Brunei	23 February 2024
Micronesia	3 November 2026

== Ruby jubilees of organizations in recent history ==
Organization	Year of Ruby Jubilee
Disneyland Resort	17 July 1995
Universal Studios Hollywood	15 July 2004
Walt Disney World	1 October 2011
Epcot	1 October 2022
Tokyo Disney Resort	15 April 2023

== See also ==
- Hierarchy of precious substances
- List of longest-reigning monarchs
- List of current reigning monarchs by length of reign
- Wedding anniversary
