= Robert L. Chapman =

American professor of literature and thesaurus editor (1920–2002)

- Born: Robert Lundquist Chapman; December 28, 1920; Huntington, West Virginia
- Died: January 27, 2002 (aged 81); Morristown, New Jersey
- Occupations: Professor of English literature Dictionary editor Thesaurus editor
- Known for: being a wordsmith and an editor of Roget's Thesaurus

Robert Lundquist Chapman (December 28, 1920 – January 27, 2002) was an American professor of English literature who edited several dictionaries and thesauri.

Chapman was born in Huntington, West Virginia to Curtis W. Chapman, a typewriter mechanic, and Cecelia Lundquist Chapman, a homemaker. Chapman graduated from Cooley High School in Detroit, Michigan in 1939. As a young man, he worked in factories and drove a truck, then enrolled at the University of Michigan to study English literature. One of his teachers at Michigan was the poet W.H. Auden. Chapman's college career was interrupted by World War II, when he served in Europe with the United States Army. He returned to Michigan afterwards and received his bachelor's, master's and doctorate degrees.

Over the years, Chapman taught English at Cornell University, Oswego State Teachers College, Wilkes College, and Drew University, with whom he became a professor emeritus in 1986. He specialized in medieval literature, and was jokingly said to resemble Geoffrey Chaucer in appearance. Between his teaching jobs, Chapman held full-time editing positions. From 1960 to 1964, he worked for Funk & Wagnalls, where he served as a supervising editor for Funk & Wagnalls Standard College Dictionary. He also had a brief stint with Holt, Rinehart & Winston, for whom he helped edit the 1966 release of the Holt Intermediate Dictionary of American English.

Chapman edited the fourth and fifth editions of Roget's Thesaurus, published by HarperCollins in 1977 and 1992. Chapman chose to retain Roget's original system of numbered categories rather than use an alphabetical system, which he found "jejune". To the fifth edition, he added thirty new categories and over 50,000 new words, such as ecosystem and yuppie. Chapman also edited HarperCollins' New Dictionary of American Slang (1986), the Thesaurus of American Slang (1989), and Roget A to Z (1994). Barbara Ann Kipfer, who edited the sixth edition of Roget's Thesaurus, noted that Chapman was one of the first lexicographers to regularly use computer databases to study words as used in the popular press.

Chapman lived in Madison, New Jersey, and died in nearby Morristown in 2002 after battling a long illness. He was survived by his wife and three sons. In an obituary, Paul Farhi of The Washington Post wrote, "On behalf of blocked writers everywhere, we salute Mr. Chapman. We also doff our caps, raise a toast, sing his praises, acclaim, commend and laud him."
