= Gothra, Bhiwani =

Gothra
- Village
- Location in Haryana, India Gothra (India)
- Coordinates: 28.4809°N 75.7755°E
- Country: India
- State: Haryana
- District: Bhiwani
- Tehsil: Loharu

Government
  - Body: Bhai Manoj Kinha Garud Commando Sarpanch

Population (2011)
  - Total: 1,625

Languages
  - Official: Hindi
- Time zone: UTC+5:30 (IST)

Gothra is a village in the Bhiwani district of the Indian state of Haryana. Located in the Loharu tehsil, it lies approximately 57 kilometres (35 mi) south west of the district headquarters town of Bhiwani. As of the 2011 Census of India, the village had 556 households with a total population of 2,631 of which 1,391 were male and 1,240 female.For political representational purposes the village is part of Loharu Assembly constituency and the Bhiwani-Mahendragarh Lok Sabha constituency.
