= Zulfikar Ali Khan of Kamadhia =

Indian nobleman

Sayyid Mir Zulfikar Ali Khan
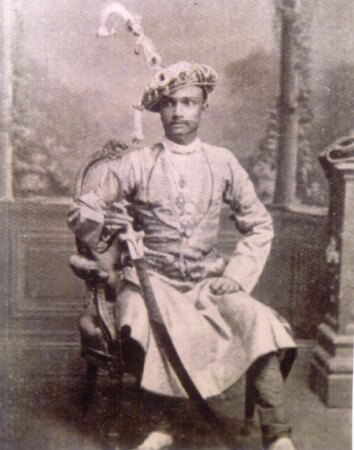

Darbar of Kamadhia
- Reign: 1863-1921
- Coronation: 1880
- Predecessor: Jufar Ali Khan
- Successor: Sarfaraz Ali Khan II
- Regent: Bakar Ali Khan (1863-1880; de facto until 1890)
- Born: 1859; Kamadhia, British Raj
- Died: 1921 (aged 61–62); Kamadhia, British Raj
- Burial: 1921
- Spouse: Khadija Begum Sahiba
- Issue: 3 (see below)
- House: Kamadhia Royal Family (Mir)
- Father: Jufar Ali Khan
- Mother: Basti Begum Sahiba
- Religion: Islam

Sayyid Mir Zulfikar Ali Khan (Gujarati: ઝુલ્ફીકાર અલી ખાન; 1859–1921) was the 3rd Darbar Sahaib of Kamadhia between 1863 and 1921.

== Reign ==
Zulfikar was born in 1859 as the second son of Jufar Ali Khan and Grandson of Sarfaraz Ali Khan I from a Muslim family lineage. He had an older brother, Amir ud-din Muhammad Khan Bahadur (b. 1841) who died as a minor, hence why he was selected as heir apparent to his father. When his father died in Surat in 1863 at the age of 46, he succeeded him as the ruler at the age of just 4, hence why a Regency was in place until 1880. He firstly went to England to study in 1873 and then studied at the Rajkumar College in Rajkot three years later. During his 58-year reign, Zulfikar experienced an influential and peaceful reign. He attended the Delhi Durbars of 1903 and 1911, and was granted medals on both occasions. His descendants are known as the Darbars of Kamadhia and Scions of the Nawabs of Surat. Eventually he died at the age of 62 in 1921 and was succeeded by his son Sarfaraz Ali Khan II. His 58-year reign was one of the longest reigns in Gujarati history.

== Issue ==
Firstly in 1879, in Ahmedabad, at the age of 20 he married Khadija Begum Sahiba, eldest daughter of Pirzada Bawa Miyan. His marriage gave him three children.

- Sarfaraz Ali Khan II (whom succeeded him in his title)
- Jafur Ali Khan (probably named after his grandfather)
- Ghulam Khwaja Moin-Uddin Khan (whom succeeded his brother in his titles in 1934)
