= Karansinhji II Vajirajji of Lakhtar =

Long–reigning Indian Monarch (1846–1924)

- Thakur Shri Karansinhji II Vajirajji CSI
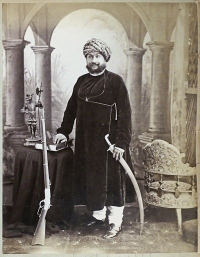
- Photo of Karansinhji II Vajirajji (early 20th century)

Thakur of Lakhtar
- Reign: 15 June 1846 – 8 August 1924
- Predecessor: Vajirajji Prithvirajji
- Successor: Balvirsinhji Karansinhji
- Born: 10 January 1846
- Died: 8 August 1924 (aged 78)
- Dynasty: Jhala Rajput
- Religion: Hinduism

Thakur Sahib Karansinhji II Vajirajji CSI (10 January 1846 – 8 August 1924) was the 12th ruler of the non-salute princely state of Lakhtar.

== Life ==
Karansinhji became ruler of Lakhtar on 15 June 1846, aged five months. He attended the 1911 Delhi Durbar, and in the 1911 Delhi Durbar Honours was appointed a Companion of the Order of the Star of India (CSI). He died on 8 August 1924 after a long reign of 78 years, 1 month and 24 days. His reign was one of the longest reigns in Indian history and the sixth longest of any verifiable ruler.
