= Gothra, Rewari =

- Vidhan sabha constituency-- Bawal Gothra, Rewari (India)
- Coordinates: 28.111900°N 76.265000°E
- Country: India
- State: Haryana
- District: Rewari district
- Look Sabha constituency- Gurgaon: Bawal/Khol
- Established: 01-November-1989

Government

Population (2011)
  - Total: 2,606
- Postal code: 123102
- ISO 3166 code: IN-HR
- Website: www.rewari.gov.in

Gothra is a village on the Rewari-Narnaul road (National Highway no. 11), 15 kilometres (9.3 mi) from Rewari in the Rewari, Haryana, India. It is also known as Gothra Pali. It is also part of the Delhi Mumbai Freight Corridor Project that is planned to be India's future trade corridor.

== Demographics ==
As of the 2011 India census, Gothra has a population of 2,606 in 549 households. Males constitute 50.8% of the population and females constitute 49.2%. Gothra has an average literacy rate of 68.6% (58.8% and 41.2% for males and females, respectively), less than the national average of 74%. In Gothra, 12.5% of the population is under 6 years of age. The main ethnic group of the village is Ahir; other ethnic groups include Darzi, Harijan, Khati, Parjapati, Valmiki, Saini, and Naai. The village has a Shiv temple at its entrance, two Johads (Ponds), and temples such as Hanuman Temple and Baba Manohar Das.

== Commerce ==
Adjacent to the village, there is a Kribhco Container Limited towards 11 No Railway Chowki. At the power house bus stand of this village, there are many shops, Restaurants, Chowdhary dhabas, a petrol pump, and a Power House (Bijli Ghar) Subdivision.

The Sakti Mata temple at the foot of village hill is one of the famous temples. A lot many devotees of Gothra Ahir Village and nearby villages i.e. Nandha, Balwari, Nangla, Mamria, and Pali visit the Sakti Mata temple especially on Saturdays. There is an upcoming Sainik School near this Temple.

People from this village work in various fields, including judicial, taxation, police, defense, para-military, finance, and teaching. Captain Ram Kunwar, who fought bravely against the enemy forces during the Sino-Indian War, was born in this village Gothra Ahir and was awarded the Vir Chakra medal for his bravery.

== Educational establishments ==
Haryana's second Sainik School is situated in Gothra. It was inaugurated in 2008 by the former CM Bhupender Singh Hooda. This school covers an area of 56 acres.

== Transportation ==
Rewari is about 95 kilometers from Delhi and is well connected by roadways and railways. More than 40 trains connect Rewari Junction station to New Delhi and amongst them Garib Rath (12215) is the fastest one that covers this distance in 1.5 hours. Regular bus service is also available with pick up points spread across different places in Delhi and Gurgaon. Taxis are fairly common and tend to be the most reliable source of transportation around. The nearest villages to Gothra are Nandha, Balwari, Nangla, Mamria, and Pali.
