= Gothra, Rajasthan =

Gothara
- Census town
- Location in Rajasthan, India Gothara (India)
- Coordinates: 25.83°N 75.6°E
- Country: India
- State: Rajasthan
- District: Jhunjhunu

Government
  - Type: Municipal corporation
- Elevation: 328 m (1,076 ft)

Population (2001)
  - Total: 21,819

Languages
  - Official: Hindi
- Time zone: UTC+5:30 (IST)
- ISO 3166 code: RJ-IN
- Vehicle registration: RJ-

Gothra is a census town in Jhunjhunu district in the Indian state of Rajasthan.

== Geography ==
Gothra is located at 25.83°N 75.6°E. It has an average elevation of 328 metres (1076 feet).

== Demographics ==
As of 2001 India census, Gothra had a population of 21,819. Males constitute 54% of the population and females 46%. Gothra has an average literacy rate of 77%, higher than the national average of 59.5%: male literacy is 86%, and female literacy is 67%. In Gothra, 10% of the population is under 6 years of age.
