= Tamilar marriage =

Tamil's Marriage customs and culture

Tamilar Marriage is regarded as an ethical institution within human life that fosters social progress. Norms and guidelines have been established to govern the marital union between men and women. The Tamils tradition of marriage embodies a unique culture and heritage that is passed down to future generations.

== History ==
Stone Age Tamils established codes of conduct regarding love and chastity, selected their partners, and lived by nurturing those relationships through various established norms. Individuals would choose their partners and, with the consent of both sets of parents, conduct a wedding ceremony—welcoming everyone to celebrate the occasion.

Marriage guidelines

- To avoid the practice of eloping with a woman, living with her for a short time, and subsequently abandoning her.
- This principle has also paved the way for preventing relationships with multiple women.

== Wedding ceremony ==
The ceremony typically takes place in a public venue or at the groom's residence. While there may be minor variations among different communities, the core customs remain consistent. Traditional practices include serving a feast on large banana leaves for the guests, Elders singing songs to bless the couple and organizing games—such as rolling a flower-ball or playing on a swing—to help the bride and groom feel at ease with each other.

== See also ==
- Marriage
