= Wedding anniversary =

Anniversary of the date on which a wedding took place

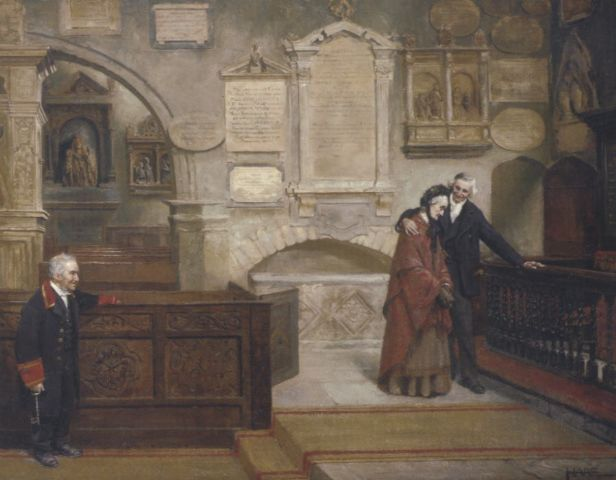
"Fifty years since our wedding day", sentimental painting by George Hare depicting an elderly couple in a church

A wedding anniversary is the anniversary of the date that a wedding took place. Couples often mark the occasion by celebrating their relationship, either privately or with a larger party. Special celebrations and gifts are often given for particular anniversary milestones (e.g., 25, 40, 50, 60, or 70 years). In some cultures, traditional names exist for milestone anniversaries; for instance, fifty years of marriage may be known variously as a "golden wedding anniversary", "golden anniversary" or "golden wedding". At these milestones, certain couples may choose to renew their marriage vows, which is often done through a church service offered in various Christian denominations (such as the Evangelical-Lutheran Churches or the Catholic Church).

== History, traditions and recognition ==
Associating a wedding anniversary with precious metals such as "gold" (50 years) or "silver" (25 years) has been documented in Germanic countries since the 1500s. In English-speaking countries, the tradition of associating gift-giving with wedding anniversaries became more prevalent in the nineteenth century. Additionally, the gifts associated with each anniversary expanded. Paper was recommended for the first anniversary, wood for the fifth anniversary and tin for the tenth anniversary.

In the twentieth century, increased commercialization led to the inclusion of more anniversaries to a list of predetermined gifts. By the early 1900s, gifts of straw for the second anniversary, candy for the third, leather for the fourth, flowers for the seventh, linen for the 12th, crystal for the 15th and china for the 20th were suggested. Today, lists cover every year up to the 50th anniversary and beyond.

In some parts of the world, couples can receive special recognition from government officials for particular milestones. In the Commonwealth realms, a couple can receive a message from the monarch for 60th, 65th and 70th wedding anniversaries and for any wedding anniversary thereafter. This is done by applying to Buckingham Palace in the United Kingdom or to the governor-general's office in the other Commonwealth realms.

In Australia, couples can receive a congratulatory letter from the governor-general on the 50th and all subsequent wedding anniversaries. The prime minister, the Leader of the Opposition, local members of both state and federal parliaments as well as state governors may also send salutations for the same anniversaries.

In Canada, couples can also receive a message from the governor-general for the 50th anniversary and every fifth anniversary after that.

In the United States, a couple can receive an anniversary greeting card from the president for the 50th and all subsequent anniversaries.

Catholics may apply for a papal blessing through their local diocese for wedding anniversaries of a special nature (25th, 50th, 60th, etc.).

== Commercial gifts ==
Some significant anniversaries have names that suggest appropriate or traditional gifts, such as a silver or platinum jubilee. Gifts may be exchanged by spouses or given by guests at parties; they may also influence an anniversary party's theme or decoration. These gifts vary in different countries, but some anniversary years now have well-established connections common to many nations; a popular analogy are the numerous jubilees thrown to celebrate anniversary milestones in the reigns of English and British monarchs, all of which are also associated with precious stones or metals.

- 25th anniversary: silver
- 40th anniversary: ruby
- 50th anniversary: gold
- 60th anniversary: diamond
- 70th anniversary: platinum

In English-speaking countries, the fifth-year gift (wood) was cut on the day of celebration and then presented to the wife as a finished item before the next two quarter days had passed.

In 1937, the American National Retail Jeweler Association (now known as Jewelers of America as a result of an organizational merger) introduced an expanded list of gifts. The revamped list gave a gift for each year up to the 20th and then for every fifth anniversary after that.

In South India, 60th and 80th wedding anniversaries are accompanied by large celebrations similar to weddings. In Tamil Nadu, there is a famous Thirukadaiyur Temple where special pujas are conducted for wedding anniversaries.

=== Traditional anniversary gifts ===
| Year | Traditional (US) | Traditional (UK) |
|---|---|---|
| 1st | Paper | Cotton or paper |
| 2nd | Cotton | Paper or cotton |
| 3rd | Leather | |
| 4th | Fruit and flowers | Linen, silk |
| 5th | Wood | |
| 6th | Iron | Sugar |
| 7th | Wool, copper | Wool |
| 8th | Bronze | Bronze, salt |
| 9th | Pottery | Copper |
| 10th | Tin, aluminum | Tin |
| 11th | Steel | |
| 12th | Silk | Silk and fine linen |
| 13th | Lace | |
| 14th | Ivory | |
| 15th | Crystal | |
| 20th | China | |
| 25th | Silver | |
| 30th | Pearl | |
| 35th | Coral | |
| 40th | Ruby | |
| 45th | Sapphire | |
| 50th | Gold | |
| 55th | Emerald | |
| 60th | Diamond | |
| 65th | | Blue sapphire |
| 70th | | Platinum |
| 75th | Diamond, gold | |
| 80th | | Oak |

=== Flower gifts ===
Flowers are also associated with wedding anniversaries up to and including the 50th anniversary.

| Year | Flower |
|---|---|
| 1st | Carnation |
| 2nd | Cosmos |
| 3rd | Sunflower |
| 4th | Geranium |
| 5th | Daisy |
| 10th | Daffodil |
| 15th | Rose |
| 20th | Aster |
| 25th | Iris |
| 30th | Lily |
| 40th | Gladiolus |
| 50th | Yellow rose with violets |

== See also ==
- Hierarchy of precious substances
