= Idris ibni Muhammad al-Qadri =

Tunku Besar of Tampin
- Reign: 31 May 1929 – 26 December 2005
- Crowning: 21 December 1945
- Successor: Razman al-Qadri
- Born: 21 December 1927
- Died: 26 December 2005 (aged 78)
- Issue: Razman al-Qadri

Idris ibni Muhammad al-Qadri (21 December 1927 – 26 December 2005) was Tunku Besar of Tampin from 1929 until his death in 2005.
