= Kamadhia =

Former small state in Gujarat, India

Coordinates: 21.8333°N 70.9333°E

Kamadhia is a town and former princely state in the western Indian state of Gujarat.

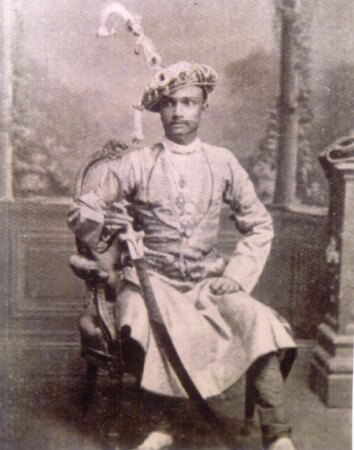
Photo taken of the ruler, Zulfikar Ali Khan around 1905.

== History ==
The small state in Gohelwar prant of Kathiawar, was ruled by Muslim Chieftains of a Mir family. It yielded a state revenue of 26,000 rupees (mainly from land), paying 377 Rupees tribute to the British.

Kamadhia was granted as princely state by the penultimate Mughal Emperor Akbar Shah to Sayyid Mir Sarfaraz Ali, an aristocratic descendant of Muhammad and of Maudud Chishti, one of the founders of the Chishti Sufi order in 1817.

The above first Darbar Sahib, Mir Sarfaraz Ali obtained a waiver of tribute to the colonial British government. This was received because of a successful rescue mission led by Mir Sarfaraz Ali commanding a garrison of 600 troops of the Gaekwad of Baroda to save the second Peshwa from a possible assassination attempt. Having successfully rescued the Peshwa in Malwa, Mir Sarfaraz Ali returned to Kamadhia.

The state came in the charge of the colonial Eastern Kathiawar Agency, like many tiny states in Saurashtra.

Still in his reign, the neighboring villages of Gothra (Gothda, later turned into a zamindari jagir), Walen (Vullun) and Vavdi (Dvaudee) were added to the state, which thus extended to 10.4 km2 and in 1948 reached a population of close to 2,000 souls.

In 1939 when famine and drought struck Kathiawar and Gujarat the first ruler to take necessary steps for the relief of his people was the Darbar of Kamadhia who issued orders reducing taxation and appointing a committee to bring to the notice of the Darbar any public grievances. It ceased to exist by accession to newly independent India's United State of Kathiawar on 15 February 1948. However the line of Darbars is nominally continued.

== Rulers ==
The Muslim princes of the Mir family held the title Darbar Sahib. Additional titles of address that accompanied the formal title of Darbar Sahib were: Meherban, Naamdar and Mir Saheb Sarkar.

- 1817 - 1860 Darbar Shree Sayyid Mir Sarfaraz `Ali I (d. 1860), grandfather of Kumar Shree Sayyid Mir Ibrahim Ali, ancestor of the Zamindars of Gothra jagir
- 1860 - 1863 Darbar Shree Nawab Sayyid Mir Ja`far (Jufar) `Ali Khan (b. 1817 - d. 1863), son of the above. He was also the Last Custodian of the Royal House of Surat.
- 1863 - 1921 Darbar Shree Nawab Sayyid Mir Zulfikar Ali Khan (b. 1859 - d. 1921), son of the above
- 1863 - 1890 Mir Bakar `Ali Khan (b. 1823 - d. 1890) - Regent to the infant Mir Zulfikar Ali, brother of Mir Ja'afar Ali
- 1921 - 1934 Darbar Shree Nawab Sayyid Mir Sarfaraz `Ali Khan II (b. 1880 - d. 1934), son of Zulfikar. He had only one daughter who died childless
- 1934 - 15 August 1947 Darbar Shree Nawab Sayyid Mir Ghulam Khwaja Mo`in- ud-Din Khan (b. 1887 - d. 1958), brother of Darbar Shree Nawab Sayyid Mir Sarfaraz Ali Khan II
- The dynastic line is nominally continued

Nominal title holders after 1958 were/are:

Darbar Shree Nawab Sayyid Mir Khairat Ali Khan (Khwaja Kutb-uddin), (b.1917-d.1998) eldest son of Darbar Shree Nawab Sayyid Mir Ghulam Khwaja Moin-ud-Din Khan (the last ruler of Kamadhia)

Darbar Shree Nawab Sayyid Mir Jaffar Ali Imam, (b.1942). Eldest son of Darbar Shree Nawab Sayyid Mir Khairat Ali Khan and Current Head of the Family. He has one son, Kumar Shree Nawabzada Sayyid Moin Mir (b.1974) who has two daughters Kunwarani Nawabzadi Sayida Aara Mir and Kunwarani Nawabzadi Sayida Zohaa Mir.
