= Ancient Rome =

Roman civilisation from the 8th century BC to the 5th century AD

Ancient Rome Roma
- 753 BC – 476/480^{1} AD
- Motto: Senatus Populusque Romanus
- Territories of the Roman civilisation: Roman Republic; Roman Empire; Western Roman Empire; Eastern Roman Empire
- Status: Kingdom (753‍–‍509 BC); Republic (509‍–‍27 BC); Empire (27 BC – 476 AD)
- Capital: Rome (others during the late Empire, notably Constantinople and Ravenna)
- Official languages: Latin
- Demonym: Roman
- Government: Elective absolute monarchy (753‍–‍509 BC); Mixed diarchic constitutional republic (509 BC – 476 AD, only de jure after 27 BC); semi-Elective absolute monarchy (27 BC – 476 AD, de facto)
- Legislature: Senate
- Historical era: Ancient history
  - Founding of Rome: 753 BC
  - Overthrow of Tarquin the Proud: 509 BC
  - Octavian proclaimed Augustus: 27 BC
  - Fall of the Western Roman Empire: 476/480^{1} AD
- 1. While the deposition of Emperor Romulus Augustulus in 476 is the most commonly cited end date for the Western Empire, the last Western Roman emperor Julius Nepos, was assassinated in 480, when the title and notion of a separate Western Empire were abolished. Another suggested end date is the reorganisation of the Italian peninsula and abolition of separate Western imperial institutions under Justinian during the latter half of the 6th century.

In modern historiography, ancient Rome is the Roman civilization from the founding of the Italian city of Rome in the 8th century BC to the collapse of the Western Roman Empire in the 5th century AD. It encompasses the Roman Kingdom (753–509 BC), the Roman Republic (509‍–‍27 BC), and the Roman Empire (27 BC – 476 AD) until the fall of the western empire. (Note: The specific dates vary, depending on whether one follows Roman tradition, modern archaeology, or competing views of which particular events mark endpoints.)

Ancient Rome began as an Italic settlement, traditionally dated to 753 BC, beside the River Tiber in the Italian Peninsula. The settlement grew into the city and polity of Rome, and came to control its neighbours through a combination of treaties and military strength. It eventually controlled the whole Italian Peninsula, assimilating the Greek culture of Magna Graecia (in southern Italy) and the Etruscan culture in north-central Italy, and then became the dominant power in the Mediterranean region and parts of Europe. At its height it controlled the North African coast, the Iberian and Balkan peninsulas and most of Southern and Western Europe, and much of the Middle East, including Anatolia, the Levant, Egypt, and parts of Mesopotamia and Arabia, and Crimea. That empire was among the largest empires in the ancient world, covering around 5 million square kilometres (1.9 million square miles) in AD 117, with an estimated 50 to 90 million inhabitants, roughly 20% of the world's population at the time. (Note: There are several different estimates for the population of the Roman Empire.: Scheidel, Saller & Morris 2007, p. 2 estimates 60 million.; Goldsmith, Raymond W. (September 1984). "An Estimate of the Size And Structure of the National Product of the Early Roman Empire". Review of Income and Wealth. 30 (3): 263. doi:10.1111/j.1475-4991.1984.tb00552.x. estimates 55.; Beloch, Karl Julius (1886). Bevölkerung der griechisch-römischen Welt (in German). Duncker. p. 507. estimates 54.; Maddison, Angus (2007). Contours of the World Economy, 1–2030 AD. Essays in Macro-Economic History. Oxford University Press. pp. 51, 120. ISBN 978-0-19-922721-1. estimates 48.; Roman Empire Population estimates 65 (while mentioning several other estimates between 55 and 120).; McLynn, Frank (2011). Marcus Aurelius: Warrior, Philosopher, Emperor. Random House. p. 3. ISBN 978-1-4464-4933-2. "[T]he most likely estimate for the reign of Marcus Aurelius is somewhere between seventy and eighty million."; McEvedy, Colin; Jones, Richard (1978). Atlas of world population history. New York: Penguin. ISBN 0-14-051076-1. OCLC 4150954. OL 4292284M.; An average of figures from different sources as listed at the US Census Bureau's Historical Estimates of World Population Archived 13 October 2013 at the Wayback Machine; Kremer, Michael (1993). "Population Growth and Technological Change: One Million B.C. to 1990". Quarterly Journal of Economics. 108 (3): 681–716. doi:10.2307/2118405. JSTOR 2118405.) The Roman state evolved from an elective monarchy to a classical republic and then to an increasingly autocratic military dictatorship during the Empire.

Ancient Rome is often grouped into classical antiquity together with ancient Greece, and their similar cultures and societies are known as the Greco-Roman world. Ancient Roman civilisation has contributed to modern language, religion, society, technology, law, politics, government, warfare, art, literature, architecture, and engineering. Rome professionalised and expanded its military and created a system of government called res publica, the inspiration for modern republics such as the United States and France. It achieved impressive technological and architectural feats, such as the empire-wide construction of aqueducts and roads, as well as more grandiose monuments and facilities.

== History ==
=== Early Italy and the founding of Rome ===
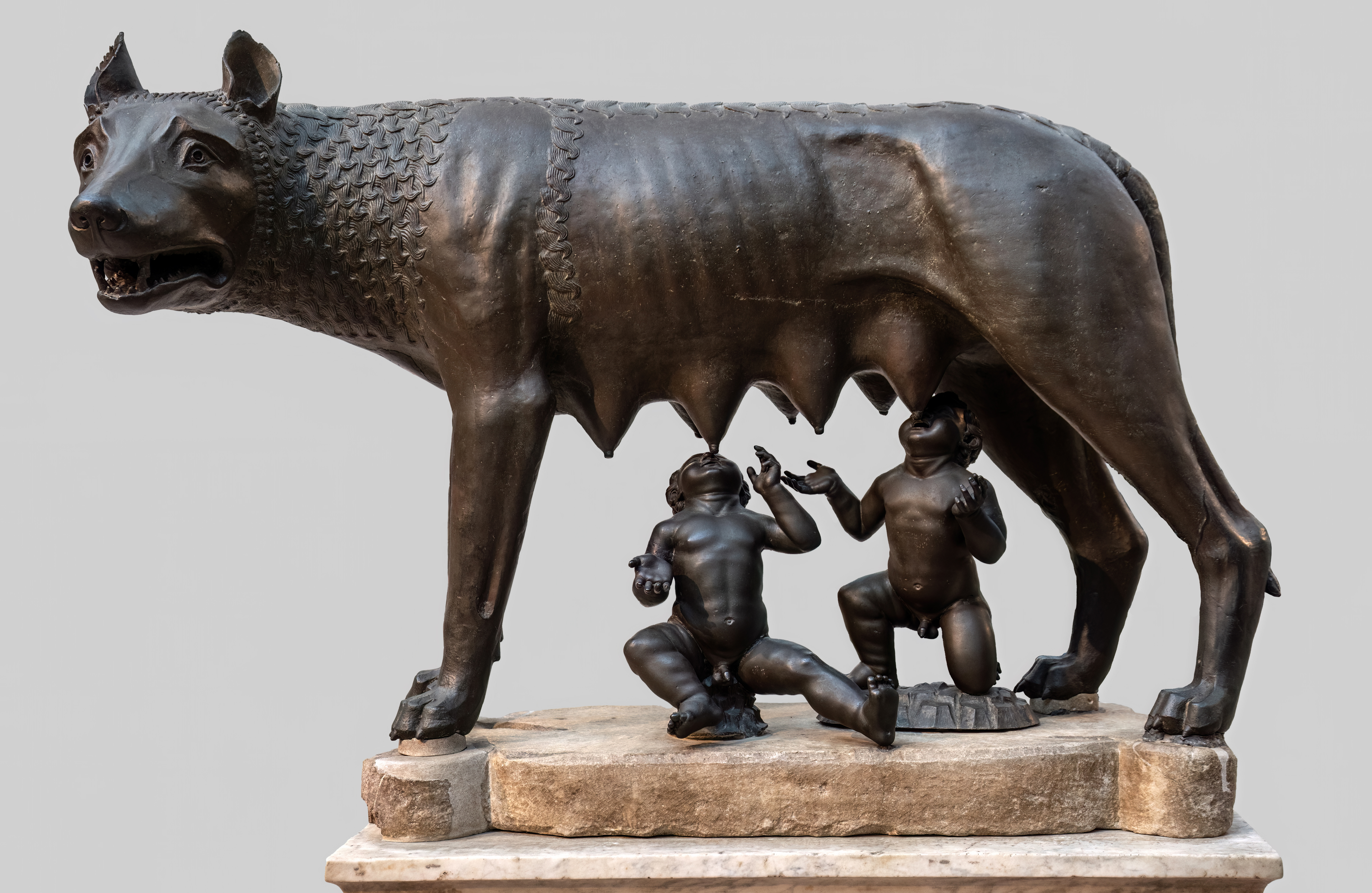
The Capitoline Wolf, now illustrating the legend that a she-wolf suckled Romulus and Remus after their mother's imprisonment in Alba Longa

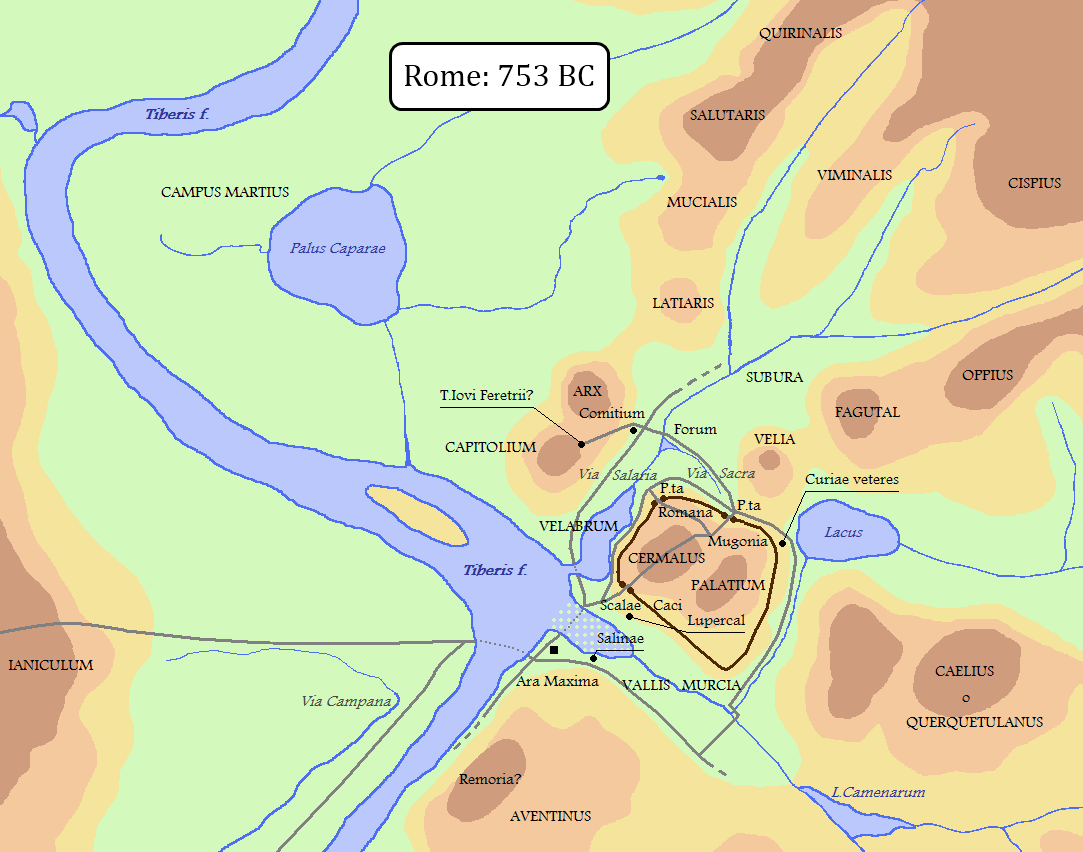
Modern reconstruction of the marshy conditions of early Rome, along with a conjectural placement of the early settlement and its fortifications

Archaeological evidence of settlement around Rome starts to emerge c. 1000 BC. Large-scale organisation appears only c. 800 BC, with the first graves in the Esquiline Hill's necropolis, along with a clay and timber wall on the bottom of the Palatine Hill dating to the middle of the 8th century BC. Starting from c. 650 BC, the Romans started to drain the valley between the Capitoline and Palatine Hills, where today sits the Roman Forum. By the 6th century BC, the Romans were constructing the Temple of Jupiter Optimus Maximus on the Capitoline and expanding to the Forum Boarium located between the Capitoline and Aventine Hills.

The Romans themselves had a founding myth, attributing their city to Romulus and Remus, offspring of Mars and a princess of the mythical city of Alba Longa. The sons, sentenced to death, were rescued by a wolf and returned to restore the Alban king and found a city. After a dispute, Romulus killed Remus and became the city's sole founder. The area of his initial settlement on the Palatine Hill was later known as Roma quadrata ('Square Rome'). The story dates at least to the 3rd century BC, and the later Roman antiquarian Marcus Terentius Varro placed the city's foundation to 753 BC. Another legend, recorded by Greek historian Dionysius of Halicarnassus, says that Prince Aeneas led a group of Trojans on a sea voyage to found a new Troy after the Trojan War. They landed on the banks of the Tiber River and a woman travelling with them, Roma, torched their ships to prevent them from leaving again. They named the settlement after her. The Roman poet Virgil recounted this legend in his classical epic poem the Aeneid.

=== Kingdom ===
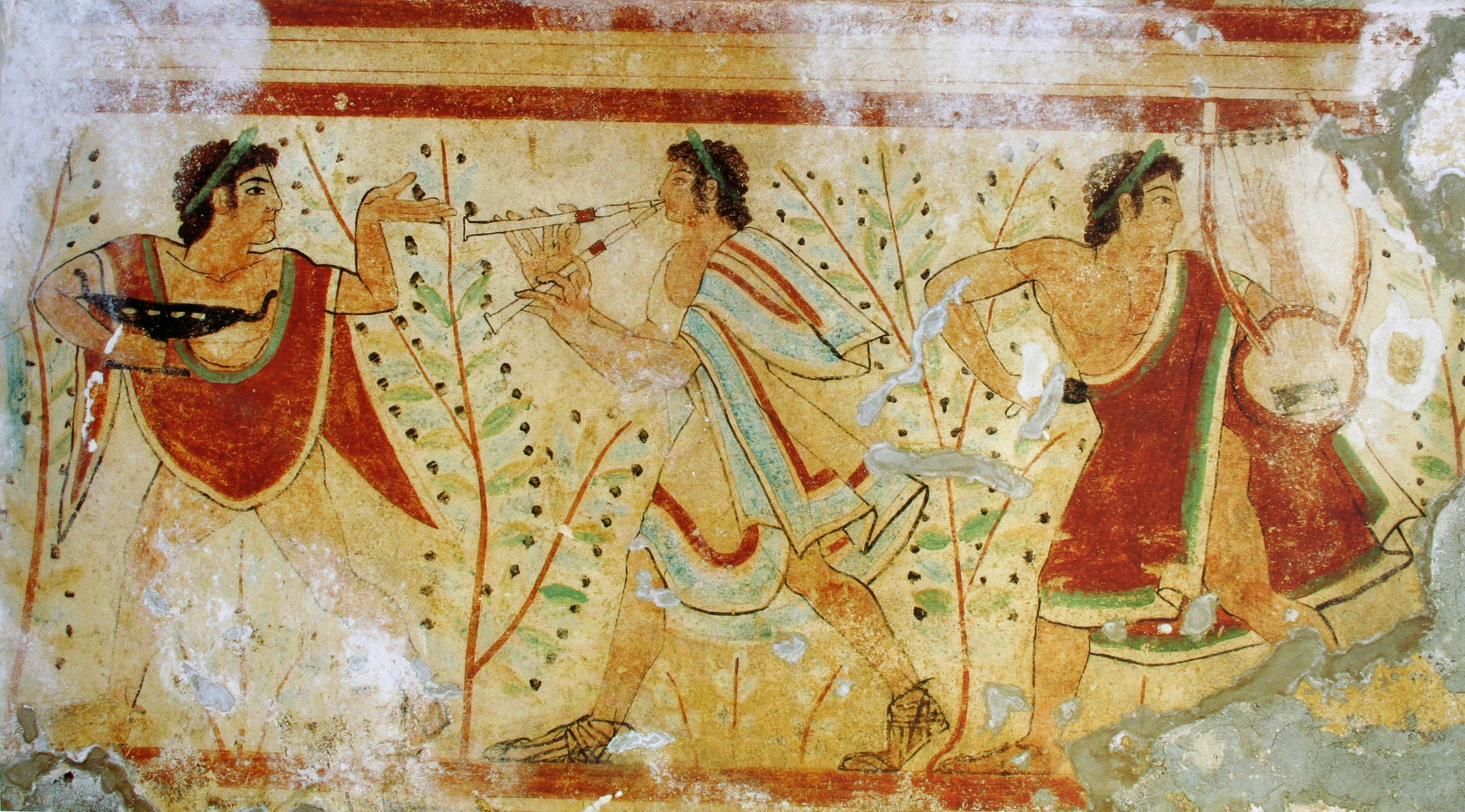
Etruscan painting of dancer and musicians from the Tomb of the Leopards in Tarquinia

Literary and archaeological evidence is clear on there having been kings in Rome, attested in fragmentary 6th-century BC texts. (Note: "Rex, the Latin word for king, appears in two fragmentary sixth-century texts, one an inscription from the shrine of Vulcan, and the other a potsherd found in the Regia".) Long after the abolition of the Roman monarchy, a vestigial rex sacrorum was retained to exercise the monarch's former priestly functions. The Romans believed that their monarchy was elective, with seven legendary kings who were largely unrelated by blood.

Evidence of Roman expansion is clear in the 6th century BC; by its end, Rome controlled a territory of some 780 square kilometres (300 square miles) with a population perhaps as high as 35,000. A palace, the Regia, was constructed c. 625 BC; the Romans attributed the creation of their first popular organisations and the Senate to the regal period as well. Rome also started to extend its control over its Latin neighbours. While later Roman stories like the Aeneid asserted that all Latins descended from the character Aeneas, a common culture is attested to archaeologically. Attested to reciprocal rights of marriage and citizenship between Latin cities—the Jus Latii—along with shared religious festivals, further indicate a shared culture. By the end of the 6th century, most of this area had become dominated by the Romans.

=== Republic ===
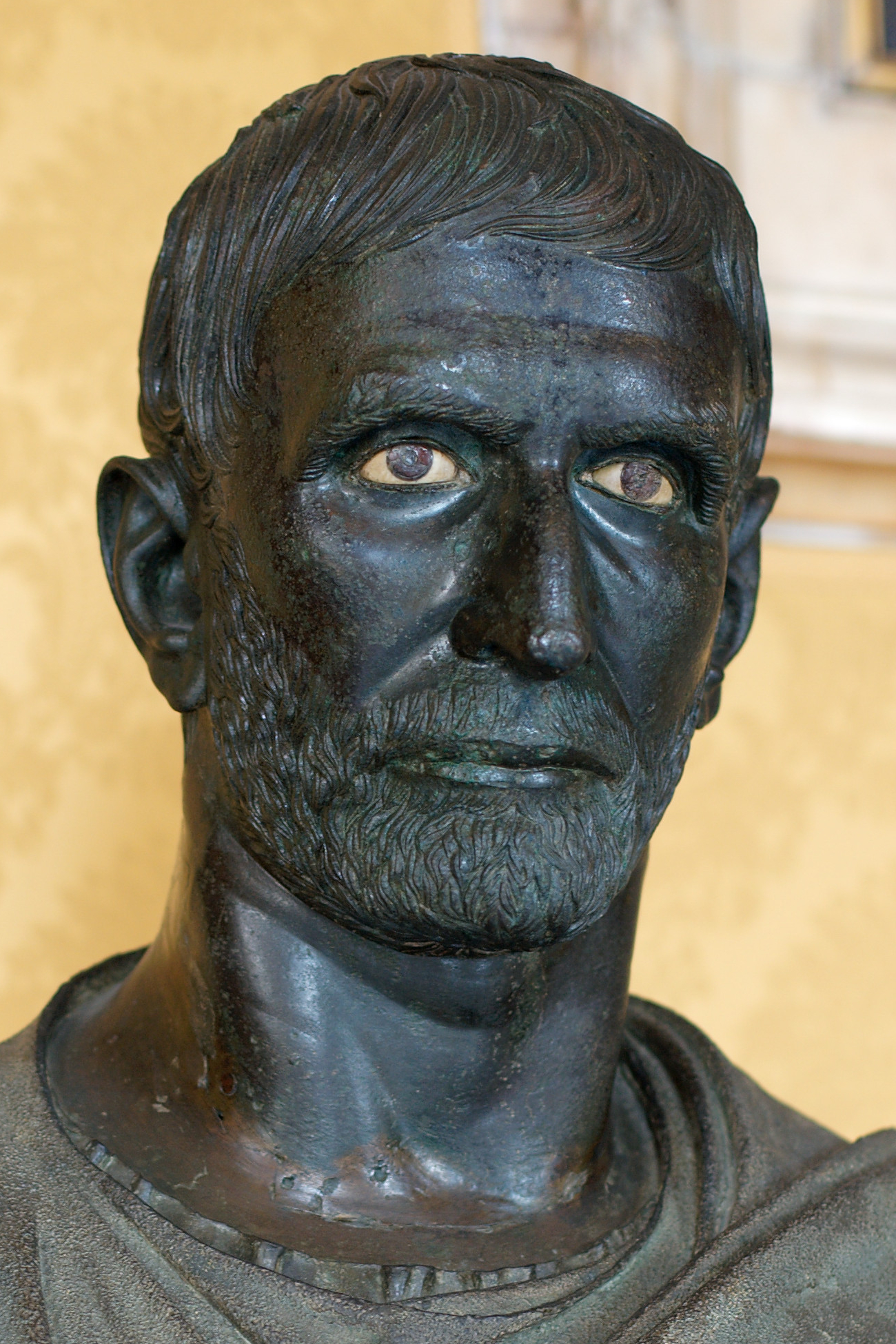
The Capitoline Brutus, a bust traditionally identified as L. Junius Brutus, one of the founders of the Republic

Italy in 400 BC, just prior to the Celtic invasion under Brennus

By the end of the 6th century BC, Rome and many of its Italian neighbours entered a period of turbulence. Archaeological evidence implies some degree of large-scale warfare. According to tradition and later writers such as Livy, the Roman Republic was established c. 509 BC, when the last of the seven kings of Rome, Tarquin the Proud, was deposed and a system based on annually elected magistrates and various representative assemblies was established. A constitution set a series of checks and balances, and a separation of powers. The most important magistrates were the two consuls, who together exercised executive authority such as imperium, or military command. The consuls had to work with the Senate, which was initially an advisory council of the ranking nobility, or patricians, but grew in size and power.

Other magistrates of the Republic include tribunes, quaestors, aediles, praetors and censors. The magistracies were originally restricted to patricians, but were later opened to common people, or plebeians. Republican voting assemblies included the comitia centuriata ('centuriate assembly'), which voted on matters of war and peace and elected men to the most important offices, and the comitia tributa ('tribal assembly'), which elected less important offices.

In the 4th century BC, Rome had come under attack by the Gauls, who now extended their power in the Italian peninsula beyond the Po Valley and through Etruria. On 16 July 390 BC, a Gallic army under the leadership of tribal chieftain Brennus, defeated the Romans at the Battle of the Allia and marched to Rome. The Gauls looted and burned the city, then laid siege to the Capitoline Hill, where some Romans had barricaded themselves, for seven months. The Gauls then agreed to give the Romans peace in exchange for 1000 pounds of gold. (Note: These are literally Roman librae, from which the pound is derived.) According to later legend, the Roman supervising the weighing noticed that the Gauls were using false scales. The Romans then took up arms and defeated the Gauls. Their victorious general Camillus remarked "With iron, not with gold, Rome buys her freedom."

The Romans gradually subdued the other peoples on the Italian peninsula, including the Etruscans. The last threat to Roman hegemony in Italy came when Tarentum, a major Greek colony, enlisted the aid of Pyrrhus of Epirus in 281 BC, but this effort failed as well. The Romans secured their conquests by founding Roman colonies in strategic areas, thereby establishing stable control over the region.

==== Punic Wars ====
Territorial changes over the course of the Punic Wars: Roman possessions and close allies Carthaginian Empire and close allies

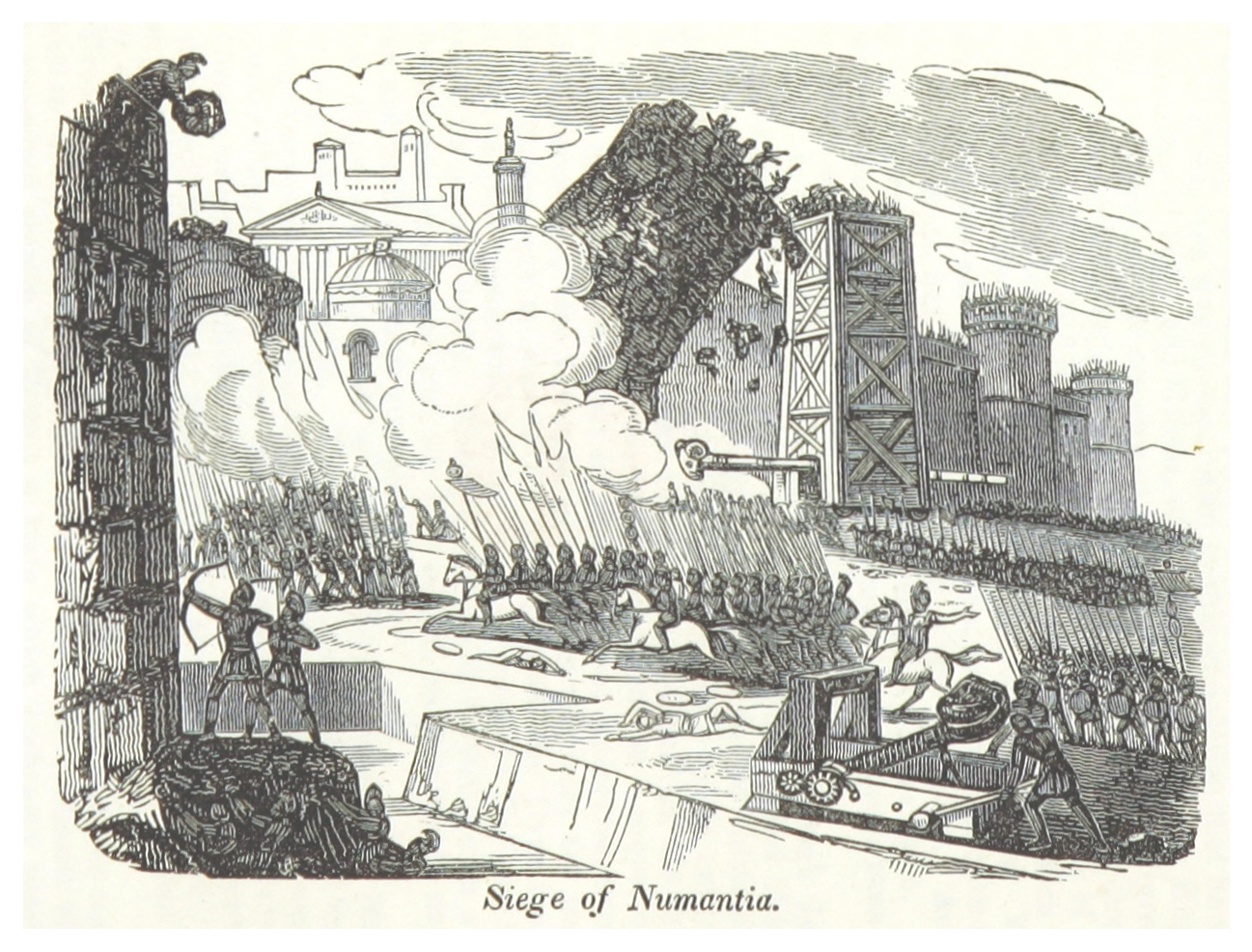
The Roman siege of the Celtiberian stronghold of Numantia in Spain in 133 BC

In the 3rd century BC Rome faced a new and formidable opponent: Carthage, the other major power in the Western Mediterranean. The First Punic War began in 264 BC, when the city of Messana asked for Carthage's help in their conflicts with Hiero II of Syracuse. After the Carthaginian intercession, Messana asked Rome to expel the Carthaginians. Rome entered this war because Syracuse and Messana were too close to the newly conquered Greek cities of Southern Italy and Carthage was now able to make an offensive through Roman territory; along with this, Rome could extend its domain over Sicily.

Carthage was a maritime power, and the Roman lack of ships and naval experience made the path to the victory a long and difficult one for the Roman Republic. Despite this, after more than 20 years of war, Rome defeated Carthage and a peace treaty was signed. Among the reasons for the Second Punic War was the subsequent war reparations Carthage acquiesced to at the end of the First Punic War. The war began with the audacious invasion of Hispania by Hannibal, who marched through Hispania to the Italian Alps. Hannibal's invasion lasted over 16 years, ravaging Italy, but ultimately Carthage was defeated in the decisive Battle of Zama in October 202 BC.

More than a half century after these events, Carthage was left humiliated and the Republic's focus was now directed towards the Hellenistic kingdoms of Greece and revolts in Hispania. However, Carthage, having paid the war indemnity, felt that its commitments and submission to Rome had ceased, a vision not shared by the Roman Senate. The Third Punic War began when Rome declared war against Carthage in 149 BC. Carthage resisted well at the first strike but could not withstand the attack of Scipio Aemilianus, who entirely destroyed the city, enslaved all the citizens and gained control of that region, which became the province of Africa. All these wars resulted in Rome's first overseas conquests (Sicily, Hispania and Africa) and the rise of Rome as a significant imperial power.

=== Late Republic ===
After defeating the Macedonian and Seleucid Empires in the 2nd century BC, the Romans became the dominant people of the Mediterranean Sea. The conquest of the Hellenistic kingdoms brought the Roman and Greek cultures in closer contact and the Roman elite, once rural, became cosmopolitan.

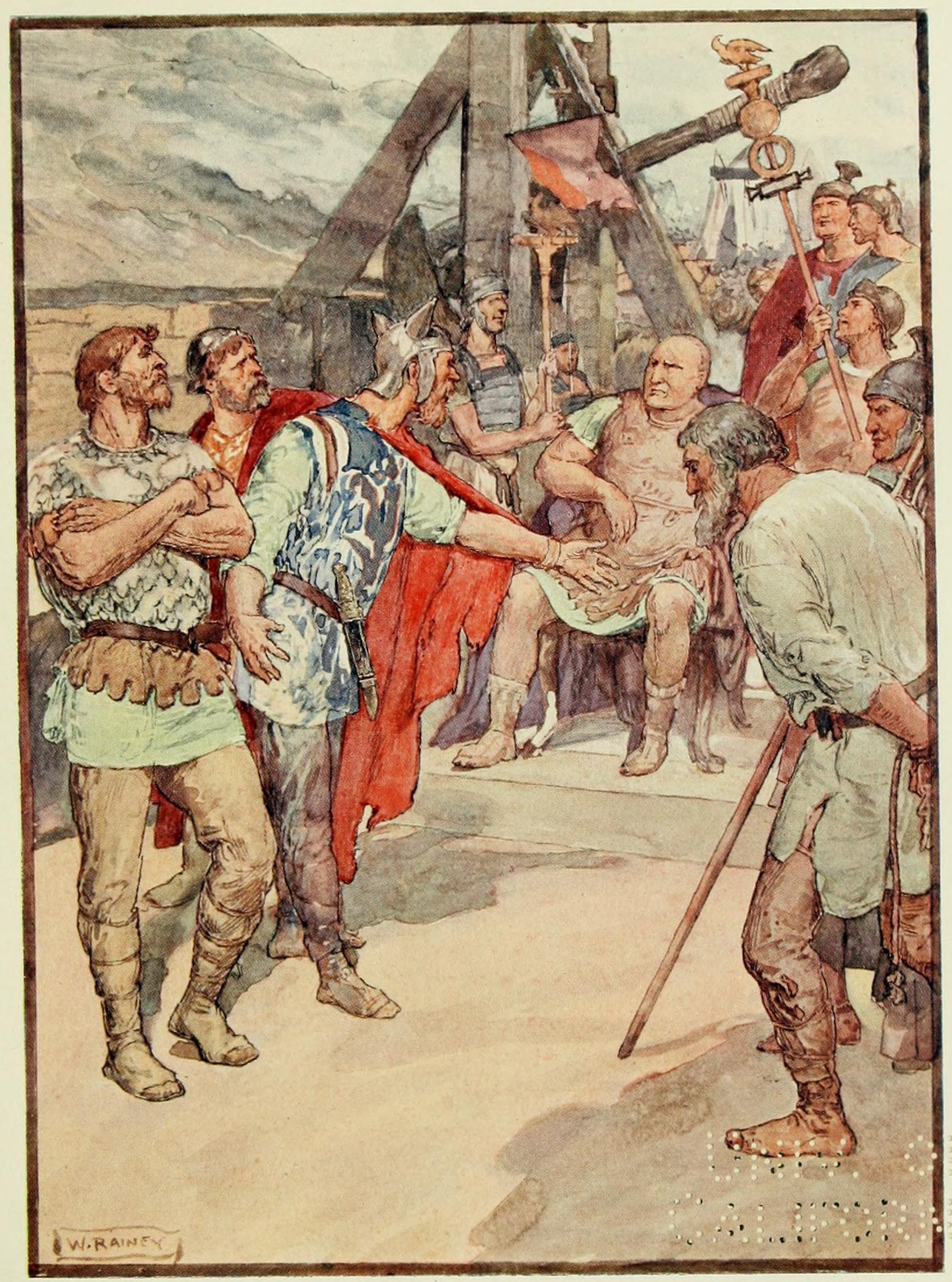
Gaius Marius, a general who dramatically reformed the Roman military and was repeatedly elected consul to handle invasions of the Cimbri and Teutones

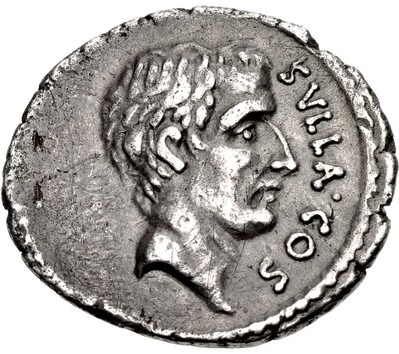
L. Cornelius Sulla, leader of the rival optimate party, who ultimately marched on Rome twice, established himself as dictator, massacring opponents and attempting to restore the prerogatives of the Patricians and Senate

Foreign dominance led to internal strife. Senators became rich at the provinces' expense; soldiers, who were mostly small-scale farmers, were away from home longer and could not maintain their land; and the increased reliance on foreign slaves and the growth of latifundia reduced the availability of paid work. Income from war booty, mercantilism in the new provinces, and tax farming created new economic opportunities for the wealthy, forming a new class of merchants, called the equestrians. The lex Claudia forbade members of the Senate from engaging in commerce, so while the equestrians could theoretically join the Senate, they were severely restricted in political power. The Senate squabbled perpetually, repeatedly blocked important land reforms and refused to give the equestrian class a larger say in the government.

Violent gangs of the urban unemployed, controlled by rival Senators, intimidated the electorate through violence. The situation came to a head in the late 2nd century BC under the Gracchi brothers, a pair of tribunes who attempted to pass land reform legislation that would redistribute the major patrician landholdings among the plebeians. Both brothers were killed and the Senate passed reforms reversing the Gracchi brother's actions. This led to the growing divide of the plebeian groups (populares) and equestrian classes (optimates).

Gaius Marius soon became a leader of the Republic, holding the first of his seven consulships (an unprecedented number) in 107 BC by arguing that his former patron Quintus Caecilius Metellus Numidicus was not able to defeat and capture the Numidian king Jugurtha. Marius then started his military reform: in his recruitment to fight Jugurtha, he levied the very poor (an innovation), and many landless men entered the army. Marius was elected for five consecutive consulships from 104 to 100 BC, as Rome needed a military leader to defeat the Cimbri and the Teutones, who were threatening Rome. After Marius's retirement, Rome had a brief peace, during which the Italian socii ('allies') requested Roman citizenship and voting rights. The reformist Marcus Livius Drusus supported their legal process but was assassinated, and the socii revolted against the Romans in the Social War. At one point both consuls were killed; Marius was appointed to command the army together with Lucius Julius Caesar and Lucius Cornelius Sulla.

By the end of the Social War, Marius and Sulla were the premier military men in Rome and their partisans were in conflict, both sides jostling for power. In 88 BC, Sulla was elected for his first consulship and his first assignment was to defeat Mithridates VI of Pontus, whose intentions were to conquer the Eastern part of the Roman territories. However, Marius's partisans managed his installation to the military command, defying Sulla and the Senate. To consolidate his own power, Sulla conducted a surprising and illegal action: he marched to Rome with his legions, killing all those who showed support to Marius's cause. In the following year, 87 BC, Marius, who had fled at Sulla's march, returned to Rome while Sulla was campaigning in Greece. He seized power along with the consul Lucius Cornelius Cinna and killed the other consul, Gnaeus Octavius, achieving his seventh consulship. Marius and Cinna revenged their partisans by conducting a massacre.

Marius died in 86 BC, due to age and poor health, just a few months after seizing power. Cinna exercised absolute power until his death in 84 BC. After returning from his Eastern campaigns, Sulla had a free path to reestablish his own power. In 83 BC he made his second march on Rome and began a time of terror: thousands of nobles, knights and senators were executed. Sulla held two dictatorships and one more consulship, which began the crisis and decline of Roman Republic.

==== Caesar and the First Triumvirate ====
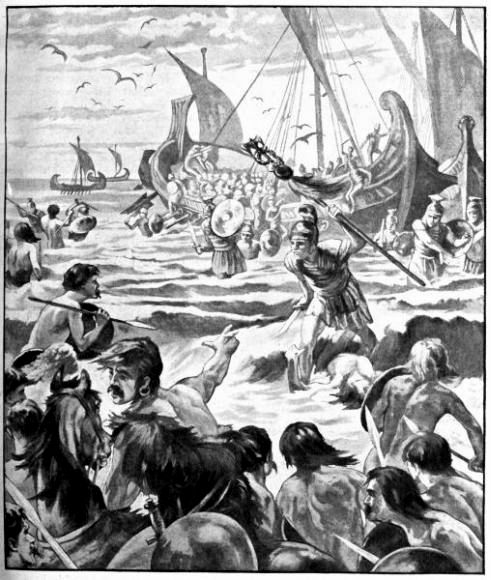
Landing of the Romans in Kent, 55 BC: Caesar with 100 ships and two legions made an opposed landing, probably near Deal. After pressing a little way inland against fierce opposition and losing ships in a storm, he retired back across the English Channel to Gaul from what was a reconnaissance in force, only to return the following year for a more serious invasion.

In the mid-1st century BC, Roman politics were restless. Political divisions in Rome split into one of two groups, populares (who hoped for the support of the people) and optimates (the 'best', who wanted to maintain exclusive aristocratic control). Sulla overthrew all populist leaders and his constitutional reforms removed powers (such as those of the tribune of the plebs) that had supported populist approaches. Meanwhile, social and economic stresses continued to build; Rome had become a metropolis with a super-rich aristocracy, debt-ridden aspirants, and a large proletariat often of impoverished farmers. The latter groups supported the Catilinarian conspiracy—a resounding failure since the consul Marcus Tullius Cicero quickly arrested and executed the main leaders.

Julius Caesar reconciled the two most powerful men in Rome: Marcus Licinius Crassus, who had financed much of his earlier career, and Crassus' rival, Gnaeus Pompeius Magnus (anglicised as Pompey), to whom he married his daughter. He formed them into a new informal alliance including himself, the First Triumvirate ('three men'). Caesar's daughter died in childbirth in 54 BC, and in 53 BC, Crassus invaded Parthia and was killed in the Battle of Carrhae; the Triumvirate disintegrated. Caesar conquered Gaul, obtained immense wealth, respect in Rome and the loyalty of battle-hardened legions. He became a threat to Pompey and was loathed by many optimates. Confident that Caesar could be stopped by legal means, Pompey's party tried to strip Caesar of his legions, a prelude to Caesar's trial, impoverishment, and exile.

To avoid this fate, Caesar crossed the Rubicon River and invaded Rome in 49 BC. The Battle of Pharsalus was a brilliant victory for Caesar and in this and other campaigns, he destroyed all of the optimates leaders: Metellus Scipio, Cato the Younger, and Pompey's son, Gnaeus Pompeius Magnus. Pompey was murdered in Egypt in 48 BC. Caesar was now pre-eminent over Rome: in five years he held four consulships, two ordinary dictatorships, and two special dictatorships, one for perpetuity. He was murdered in 44 BC, on the Ides of March by the Liberatores.

==== Octavian and the Second Triumvirate ====
Caesar's assassination caused political and social turmoil in Rome; the city was ruled by his friend and colleague, Mark Antony. Soon afterward, Octavian, whom Caesar adopted through his will, arrived in Rome. Octavian (historians regard Octavius as Octavian due to the Roman naming conventions) tried to align himself with the Caesarian faction. In 43 BC, along with Antony and Marcus Aemilius Lepidus, Caesar's best friend, he legally established the Second Triumvirate. Upon its formation, 130–300 senators were executed, and their property was confiscated, due to their supposed support for the Liberatores.

In 42 BC, the Senate deified Caesar as Divus Iulius; Octavian thus became Divi filius, the son of the deified. (Note: The reference presents two examples of coins bearing the inscription, one "Divi Iuli filius" (God Julius), and the other "Divi filius" (son of God).) In the same year, Octavian and Antony defeated both Caesar's assassins and the leaders of the Liberatores, Marcus Junius Brutus and Gaius Cassius Longinus, in the Battle of Philippi. The Second Triumvirate was marked by the proscriptions of many senators and equites: after a revolt led by Antony's brother Lucius Antonius, more than 300 senators and equites involved were executed, although Lucius was spared.

The Triumvirate divided the Empire among the triumvirs: Lepidus was given charge of Africa, Antony, the eastern provinces, and Octavian remained in Italia and controlled Hispania and Gaul. The Second Triumvirate expired in 38 BC but was renewed for five more years. However, the relationship between Octavian and Antony had deteriorated, and Lepidus was forced to retire in 36 BC after betraying Octavian in Sicily. By the end of the Triumvirate, Antony was living in Ptolemaic Egypt, ruled by his lover, Cleopatra VII. Antony's affair with Cleopatra was seen as an act of treason, since she was queen of another country. Additionally, Antony adopted a lifestyle considered too extravagant and Hellenistic for a Roman statesman. Following Antony's Donations of Alexandria, which gave to Cleopatra the title of "Queen of Kings", and to Antony's and Cleopatra's children the regal titles to the newly conquered Eastern territories, war between Octavian and Antony broke out. Octavian annihilated Egyptian forces in the Battle of Actium in 31 BC. Antony and Cleopatra committed suicide. Now Egypt was conquered by the Roman Empire.

=== Empire – the Principate ===
The Augustus of Prima Porta, 1st century AD, depicting Augustus, the first Roman emperor

In 27 BC and at the age of 36, Octavian was the sole Roman leader. In that year, he took the name Augustus. That event is usually taken by historians as the beginning of Roman Empire. Officially, the government was republican, but Augustus assumed absolute powers. His reform of the government brought about a two-century period colloquially referred to by Romans as the Pax Romana.

==== Julio-Claudian dynasty ====
The Julio-Claudian dynasty was established by Augustus. The emperors of this dynasty were Augustus, Tiberius, Caligula, Claudius and Nero. The Julio-Claudians started the destruction of republican values, but on the other hand, they boosted Rome's status as the central power in the Mediterranean region. While Caligula and Nero are usually remembered in popular culture as dysfunctional emperors, Augustus and Claudius are remembered as successful in politics and the military. This dynasty instituted imperial tradition in Rome and frustrated any attempt to reestablish a Republic.

Augustus (r. 27 BC – AD 14) gathered almost all the republican powers under his official title, princeps, and diminished the political influence of the senatorial class by boosting the equestrian class. The senators lost their right to rule certain provinces, like Egypt, since the governor of that province was directly nominated by the emperor. The creation of the Praetorian Guard and his reforms in the military, creating a standing army with a fixed size of 28 legions, ensured his total control over the army. Compared with the Second Triumvirate's epoch, Augustus' reign as princeps was very peaceful, which led the people and the nobles of Rome to support Augustus, increasing his strength in political affairs. His generals were responsible for the field command, gaining such commanders as Marcus Vipsanius Agrippa, Nero Claudius Drusus and Germanicus much respect from the populace and the legions. Augustus intended to extend the Roman Empire to the whole known world, and in his reign, Rome conquered Cantabria, Aquitania, Raetia, Dalmatia, Illyricum and Pannonia. Under Augustus' reign, Roman literature grew steadily in what is known as the Golden Age of Latin Literature. Poets like Virgil, Horace, Ovid and Rufus developed a rich literature, and were close friends of Augustus. Along with Maecenas, he sponsored patriotic poems, such as Virgil's epic Aeneid and historiographical works like those of Livy. Augustus continued the changes to the calendar promoted by Caesar, and the month of August is named after him. Augustus brought a peaceful and thriving era to Rome, known as Pax Romana.

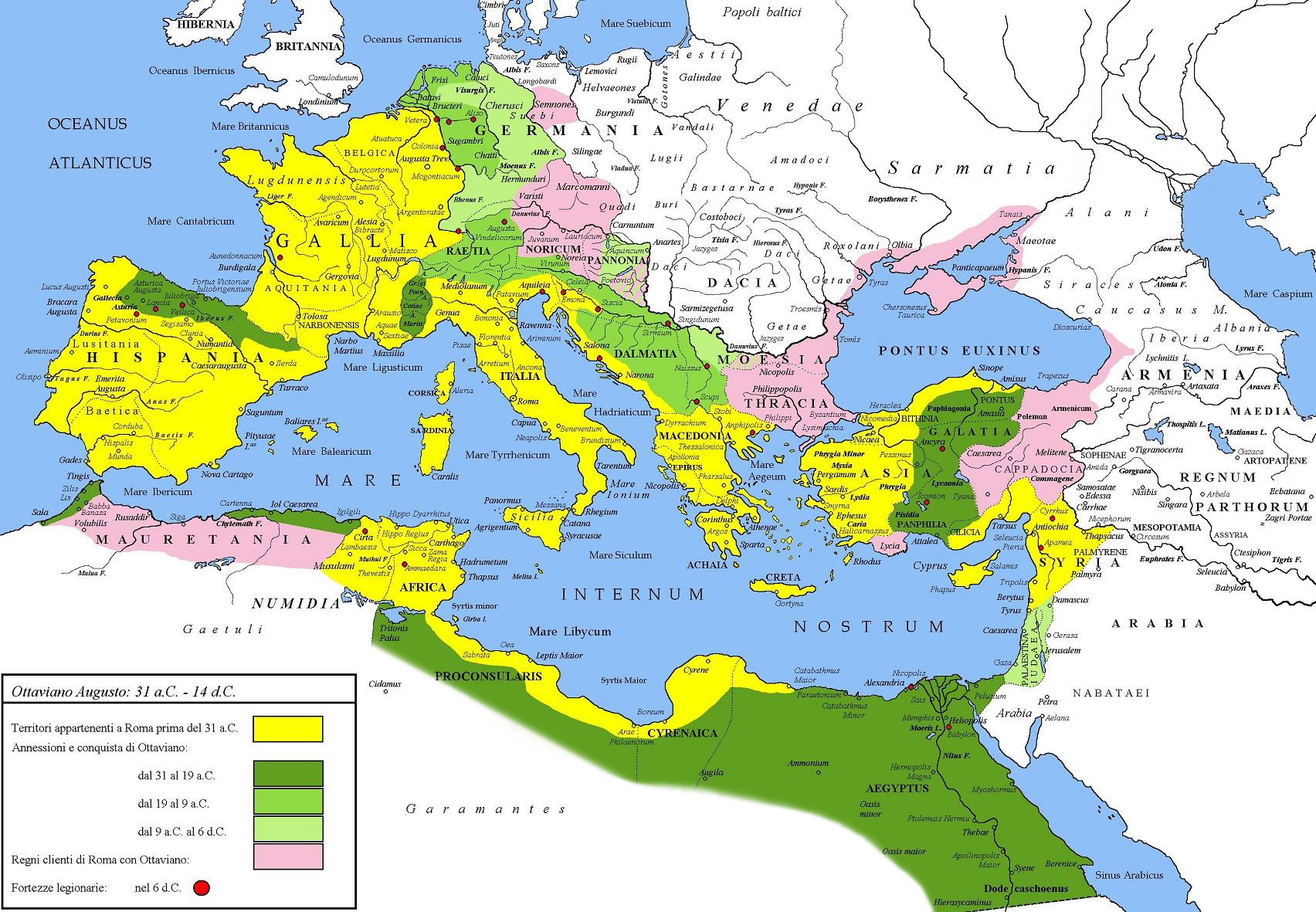
Extent of the Roman Empire under Augustus. The yellow legend represents the extent of the Republic in 31 BC, the shades of green represent gradually conquered territories under the reign of Augustus, and pink areas on the map represent client states; areas under Roman control shown here were subject to change even during Augustus' reign, especially in Germania.

The Julio-Claudians continued to rule Rome after Augustus' death in 14 AD and remained in power until the death of Nero in 68 AD. Influenced by his wife, Livia Drusilla, Augustus appointed her son from another marriage, Tiberius, as his heir. The Senate agreed with the succession, and granted to Tiberius the same titles and honours once granted to Augustus: the title of princeps and Pater patriae, and the Civic Crown. However, Tiberius was not an enthusiast for political affairs: after agreement with the Senate, he retired to Capri in 26 AD, and left control of the city of Rome in the hands of the praetorian prefect Sejanus (until 31 AD) and Macro (from 31 to 37 AD).

Tiberius died (or was killed) in 37 AD. The male line of the Julio-Claudians was limited to Tiberius' nephew Claudius, his grandson Tiberius Gemellus and his grand-nephew Caligula. As Gemellus was still a child, Caligula was chosen to rule the empire. He was a popular leader in the first half of his reign, but became a crude and insane tyrant in his years controlling government. The Praetorian Guard murdered Caligula four years after the death of Tiberius, and, with belated support from the senators, proclaimed his uncle Claudius as the new emperor. Claudius was not as authoritarian as Tiberius and Caligula. Claudius conquered Lycia and Thrace; his most important deed was the beginning of the conquest of Britannia. Claudius was poisoned by his wife, Agrippina the Younger in 54 AD. His heir was Nero, son of Agrippina and her former husband, since Claudius' son Britannicus had not reached manhood upon his father's death.

Nero sent his general, Suetonius Paulinus, to invade modern-day Wales, where he encountered stiff resistance. The Celts there were independent, tough, resistant to tax collectors, and fought Paulinus as he battled his way across from east to west. It took him a long time to reach the north-west coast, and in 60 AD he finally crossed the Menai Strait to the sacred island of Mona (Anglesey), the last stronghold of the druids. His soldiers attacked the island and massacred the druids: men, women and children, destroyed the shrine and the sacred groves and threw many of the sacred standing stones into the sea. While Paulinus and his troops were massacring druids in Mona, the tribes of modern-day East Anglia staged a revolt led by queen Boadicea of the Iceni. The rebels sacked and burned Camulodunum, Londinium and Verulamium (modern-day Colchester, London and St Albans respectively) before they were crushed by Paulinus. Boadicea, like Cleopatra before her, committed suicide to avoid the disgrace of being paraded in triumph in Rome. Nero is widely known as the first persecutor of Christians and for the Great Fire of Rome, rumoured to have been started by the emperor himself. A conspiracy against Nero in 65 AD under Calpurnius Piso failed, but in 68 AD the armies under Julius Vindex in Gaul and Servius Sulpicius Galba in modern-day Spain revolted. Deserted by the Praetorian Guards and condemned to death by the senate, Nero killed himself.

==== Flavian dynasty ====
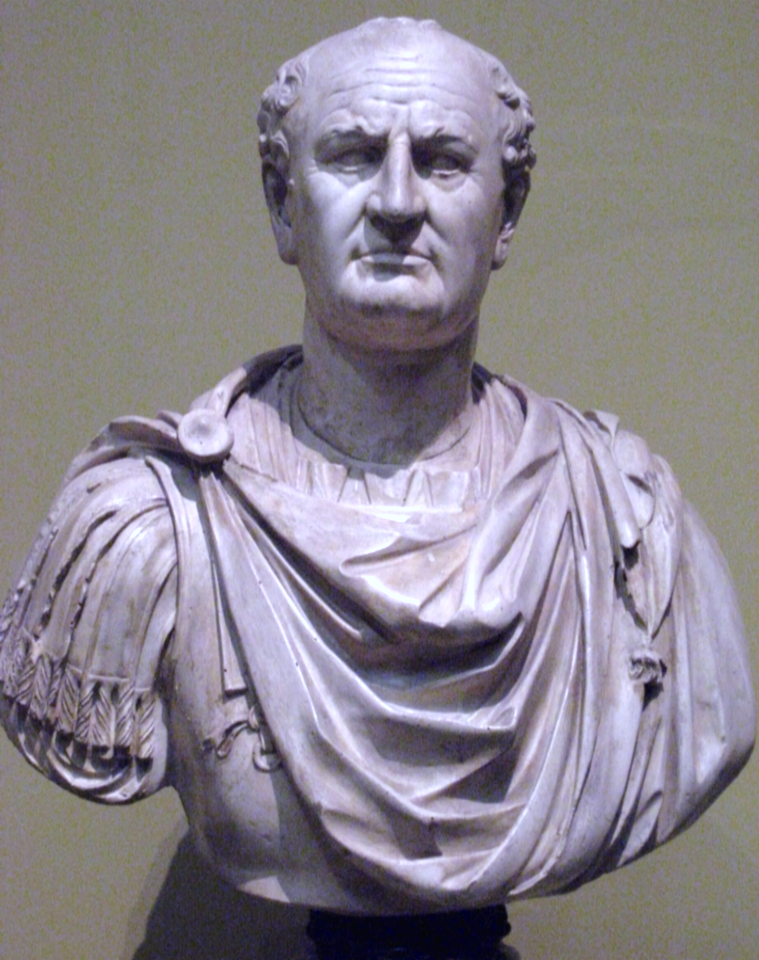
Bust of Vespasian, founder of the Flavian dynasty

The Flavians were the second dynasty to rule Rome. By 68 AD, the year of Nero's death, there was no chance of a return to the Republic, and so a new emperor had to arise. After the turmoil in the Year of the Four Emperors, Titus Flavius Vespasianus (anglicised as Vespasian) took control of the empire and established a new dynasty. Under the Flavians, Rome continued its expansion, and the state remained secure.

The most significant military campaign undertaken during the Flavian period was the siege and destruction of Jerusalem in 70 AD by Titus. The destruction of the city was the culmination of the Roman campaign in Judea following the Jewish uprising of 66 AD. The Second Temple was completely demolished, after which Titus' soldiers proclaimed him imperator in honour of the victory. Jerusalem was sacked and much of the population killed or dispersed. Josephus claims that 1,100,000 people were killed during the siege, of whom a majority were Jewish, and 97,000 were captured and enslaved. Many fled to areas around the Mediterranean.

Vespasian was a general under Claudius and Nero and fought as a commander in the First Jewish-Roman War. Following the turmoil of the Year of the Four Emperors, in 69 AD, four emperors were enthroned in turn: Galba, Otho, Vitellius, and, lastly, Vespasian, who crushed Vitellius' forces and became emperor. He reconstructed many buildings which were uncompleted, like a statue of Apollo and the temple of Divus Claudius ("the deified Claudius"), both initiated by Nero. Buildings destroyed by the Great Fire of Rome were rebuilt, and he revitalised the Capitol. Vespasian started the construction of the Flavian Amphitheater, commonly known as the Colosseum. The historians Josephus and Pliny the Elder wrote their works during Vespasian's reign. Vespasian was Josephus' sponsor and Pliny dedicated his Naturalis Historia to Titus, son of Vespasian. Vespasian sent legions to defend the eastern frontier in Cappadocia, extended the occupation in Britannia (modern-day England, Wales and southern Scotland) and reformed the tax system. He died in 79 AD.

Titus became emperor in 79. He finished the Flavian Amphitheater, using war spoils from the First Jewish-Roman War, and hosted victory games that lasted for a hundred days. These games included gladiatorial combats, horse races and a sensational mock naval battle on the flooded grounds of the Colosseum. Titus died of fever in 81 AD, and was succeeded by his brother Domitian. As emperor, Domitian showed the characteristics of a tyrant. He ruled for fifteen years, during which time he acquired a reputation for self-promotion as a living god. He constructed at least two temples in honour of Jupiter, the supreme deity in Roman religion. He was murdered following a plot within his own household.

==== Nerva–Antonine dynasty ====
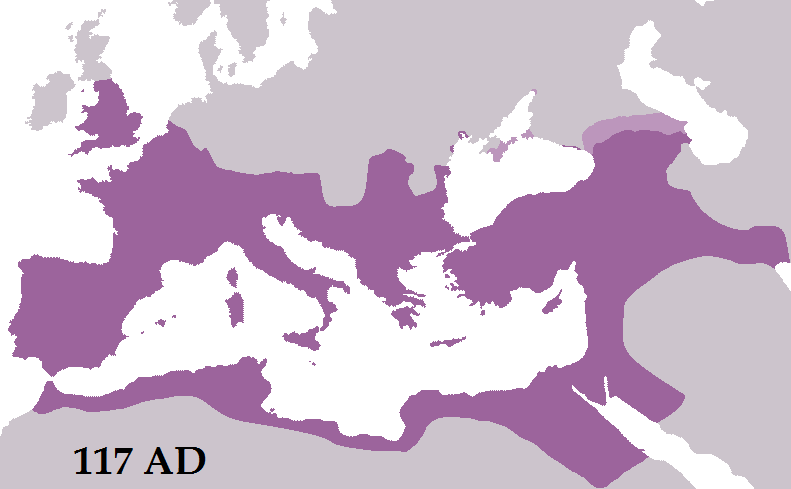
The Roman Empire reached its greatest extent under Trajan in AD 117

Following Domitian's murder, the Senate rapidly appointed Nerva as Emperor. Nerva had noble ancestry, and he had served as an advisor to Nero and the Flavians. His rule restored many of the traditional liberties of Rome's upper classes, which Domitian had over-ridden. The Nerva–Antonine dynasty from 96 AD to 192 AD included the "five good emperors" Nerva, Trajan, Hadrian, Antoninus Pius and Marcus Aurelius. Trajan, Hadrian, Antoninus Pius and Marcus Aurelius were part of Italic families settled in Roman colonies outside of Italy: the families of Trajan and Hadrian had settled in Italica (Hispania Baetica), that of Antoninus Pius in Colonia Agusta Nemausensis (Gallia Narbonensis), and that of Marcus Aurelius in Colonia Claritas Iulia Ucubi (Hispania Baetica). The Nerva-Antonine dynasty came to an end with Commodus, son of Marcus Aurelius.

Nerva abdicated and died in 98 AD, and was succeeded by the general Trajan. Trajan is credited with the restoration of traditional privileges and rights of commoner and senatorial classes, which later Roman historians claim to have been eroded during Domitian's autocracy. Trajan fought three Dacian wars, winning territories roughly equivalent to modern-day Romania and Moldova. He undertook an ambitious public building program in Rome, including Trajan's Forum, Trajan's Market and Trajan's Column, with the architect Apollodorus of Damascus. He remodelled the Pantheon and extended the Circus Maximus. When Parthia appointed a king for Armenia without consulting Rome, Trajan declared war on Parthia and deposed the king of Armenia. In 115 he took the Northern Mesopotamian cities of Nisibis and Batnae, organised a province of Mesopotamia (116), and issued coins that claimed Armenia and Mesopotamia were under the authority of the Roman people. In that same year, he captured Seleucia and the Parthian capital Ctesiphon (near modern Baghdad). After defeating a Parthian revolt and a Jewish revolt, he withdrew due to health issues, and in 117, he died of edema. Under Trajan, the Roman Empire had reached the peak of its territorial expansion. Rome's dominion now spanned 5.0 million square kilometres (1.9 million square miles).

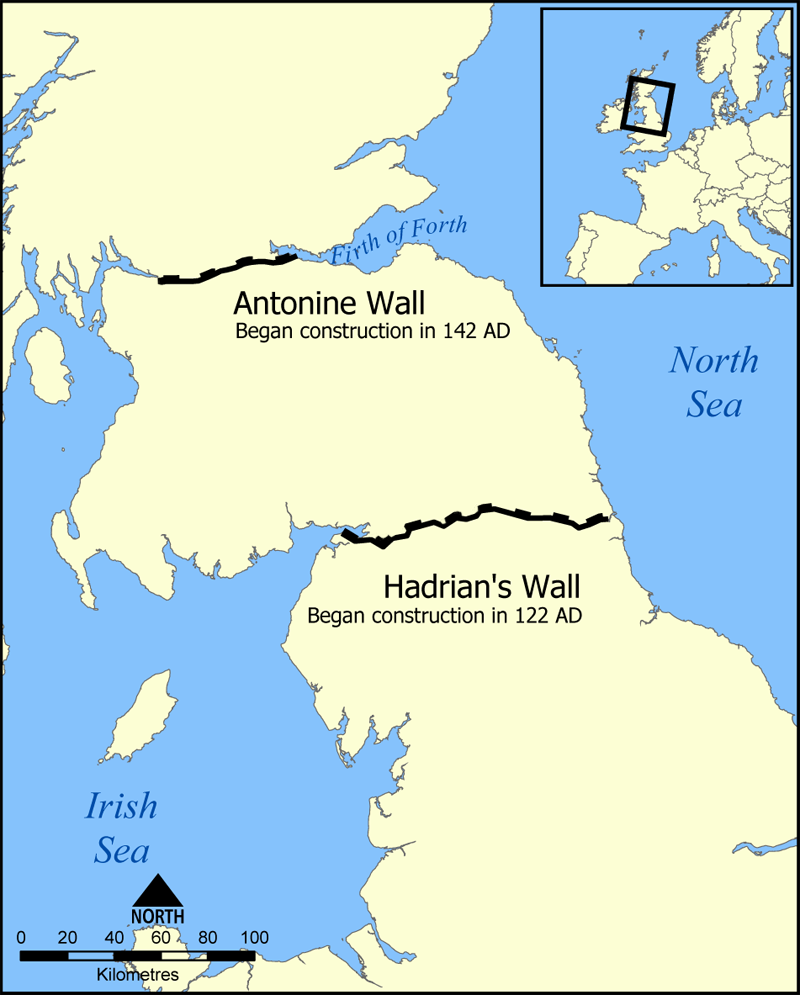
Map showing the location of Hadrian's Wall and the Antonine Wall in Scotland and Northern England

Trajan's successor Hadrian withdrew all the troops stationed in Parthia, Armenia and Mesopotamia (modern-day Iraq), abandoning Trajan's conquests. Hadrian's army crushed a revolt in Mauretania and the Bar Kokhba revolt in Judea. This was the last large-scale Jewish revolt against the Romans, and was suppressed with massive repercussions in Judea. Hundreds of thousands of Jews were killed. Hadrian renamed the province of Judea "Provincia Syria Palaestina", after one of Judea's most hated enemies. He constructed fortifications and walls, like the celebrated Hadrian's Wall which separated Roman Britannia and the tribes of modern-day Scotland. Hadrian promoted culture, especially the Greek. He forbade torture and humanised the laws. His many building projects included aqueducts, baths, libraries and theatres; additionally, he travelled nearly every province in the Empire to review military and infrastructural conditions.

Following Hadrian's death in 138 AD, his successor Antoninus Pius built temples, theatres, and mausoleums, promoted the arts and sciences, and bestowed honours and financial rewards upon the teachers of rhetoric and philosophy. On becoming emperor, Antoninus made few initial changes, leaving intact as far as possible the arrangements instituted by his predecessor. Antoninus expanded Roman Britannia by invading what is now southern Scotland and building the Antonine Wall. He also continued Hadrian's policy of humanising the laws. His reign was the most peaceful in the entire history of Roman Empire, he left "an empire in very fine shape. It was a height that, arguably, it would never reach again." He died in 161 AD.

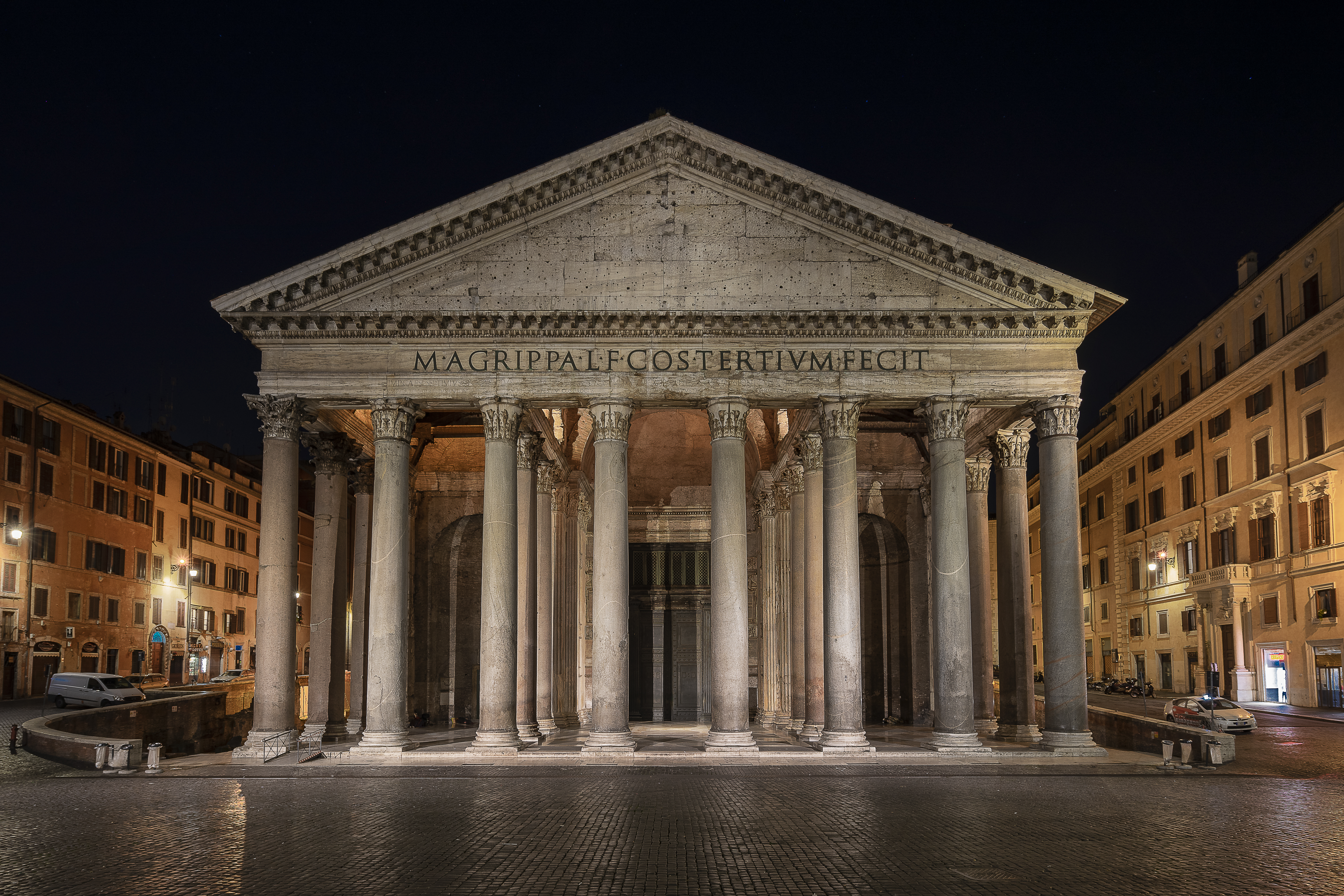
The Pantheon, Rome, built during the reign of Hadrian, which still contains the largest unreinforced concrete dome in the world

Marcus Aurelius, known as the Philosopher, was the last of the Five Good Emperors. He was a stoic philosopher and wrote the Meditations. He defeated barbarian tribes in the Marcomannic Wars as well as the Parthian Empire. His co-emperor, Lucius Verus, died in 169 AD, probably from the Antonine Plague, a pandemic that killed nearly five million people through the Empire in 165–180 AD.

From Nerva to Marcus Aurelius, the empire achieved an unprecedented status. The powerful influence of laws and manners had gradually cemented the union of the provinces. All the citizens enjoyed and abused the advantages of wealth. The image of a free constitution was preserved with decent reverence. The Roman senate appeared to possess the sovereign authority, and devolved on the emperors all the executive powers of government. Gibbon declared the rule of these "Five Good Emperors" the golden era of the Empire. During this time, Rome reached its greatest territorial extent.

Commodus, son of Marcus Aurelius, became emperor after his father's death. He is not counted as one of the Five Good Emperors, due to his direct kinship with the latter emperor; in addition, he was militarily passive. Cassius Dio identifies his reign as the beginning of Roman decadence: "(Rome has transformed) from a kingdom of gold to one of iron and rust."

==== Severan dynasty ====
Commodus was killed by a conspiracy involving Quintus Aemilius Laetus and his wife Marcia in late 192 AD. The following year is known as the Year of the Five Emperors, during which Helvius Pertinax, Didius Julianus, Pescennius Niger, Clodius Albinus and Septimius Severus held the imperial dignity. Pertinax, a member of the senate who had been one of Marcus Aurelius's right-hand men, was the choice of Laetus, and he ruled vigorously and judiciously. Laetus soon became jealous and instigated Pertinax's murder by the Praetorian Guard, who then auctioned the empire to the highest bidder, Didius Julianus, for 25,000 sesterces per man. The people of Rome were appalled and appealed to the frontier legions to save them. The legions of three frontier provinces—Britannia, Pannonia Superior, and Syria—resented being excluded from the "donative" and replied by declaring their individual generals to be emperor. Lucius Septimius Severus Geta, the Pannonian commander, bribed the opposing forces, pardoned the Praetorian Guards and installed himself as emperor. He and his successors governed with the legions' support. The changes on coinage and military expenditures were the root of the financial crisis that marked the Crisis of the Third Century.

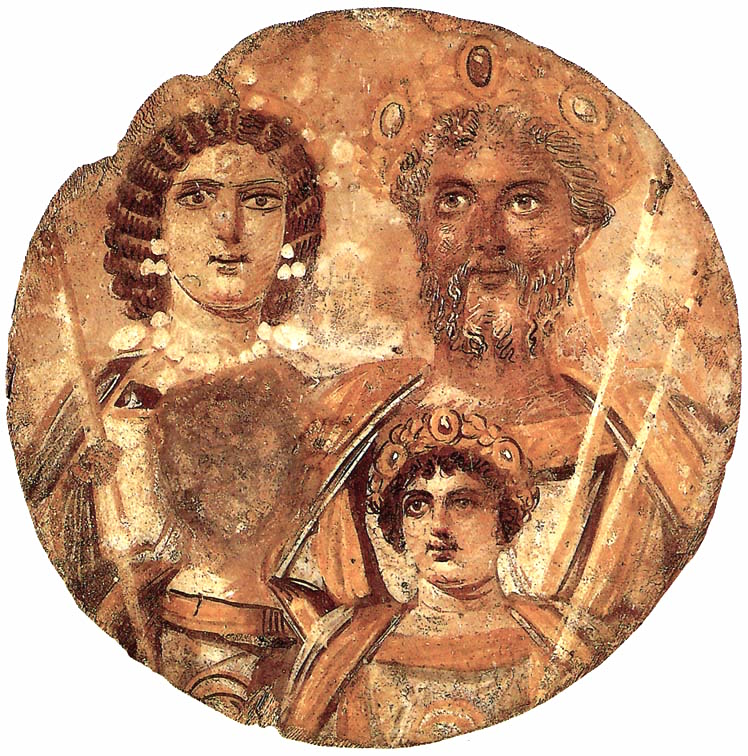
The Severan Tondo, c. 199, Severus, Julia Domna, Caracalla and Geta, whose face is erased

Severus was enthroned after invading Rome and having Didius Julianus killed. Severus attempted to revive totalitarianism and, addressing the Roman people and Senate, praised the severity and cruelty of Marius and Sulla, which worried the senators. When Parthia invaded Roman territory, Severus successfully waged war against that country. Notwithstanding this military success, Severus failed in invading Hatra, a rich Arabian city. Severus killed his legate, who was gaining respect from the legions; and his soldiers fell victim to famine. After this disastrous campaign, he withdrew. Severus also intended to vanquish the whole of Britannia. To achieve this, he waged war against the Caledonians. However, he became ill and died in 211 AD.

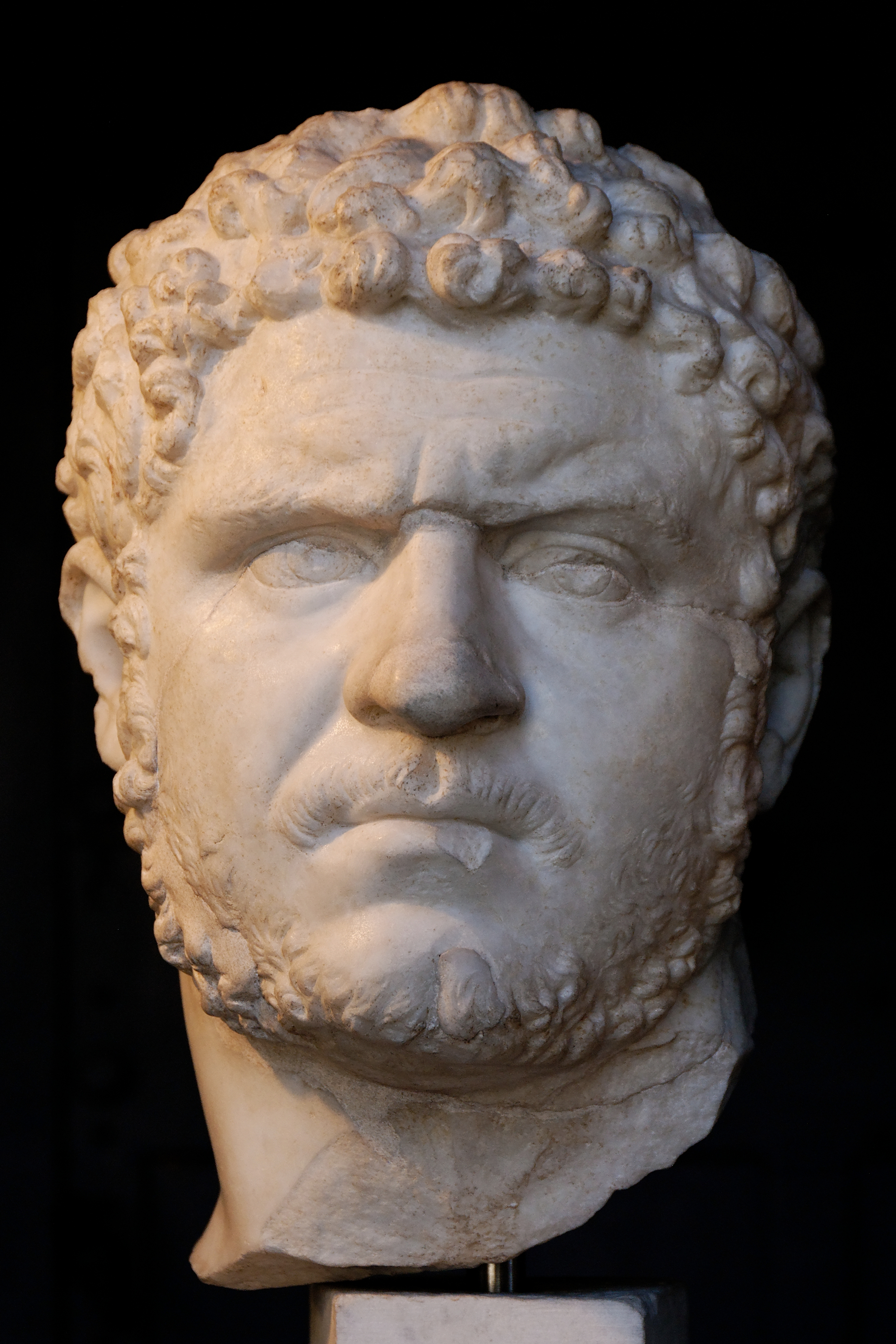
Bust of Caracalla from the Capitoline Museums, Rome

His sons Caracalla and Geta were made emperors. Caracalla had his brother, a youth, assassinated in his mother's arms, and may have murdered 20,000 of Geta's followers. Like his father, Caracalla was warlike. He continued Severus' policy and gained respect from the legions. Knowing that the citizens of Alexandria disliked him and were denigrating his character, Caracalla served a banquet for its notable citizens, after which his soldiers killed all the guests. From the security of the temple of Sarapis, he then directed an indiscriminate slaughter of Alexandria's people. In 212, he issued the Edict of Caracalla, giving full Roman citizenship to all free men living in the Empire, with the exception of the dediticii, people who had become subject to Rome through surrender in war, and freed slaves. (Note: "I grant to all the inhabitants of the Empire the Roman citizenship and no one remains outside a civitas, with the exception of the dediticii".)

Mary Beard points to the edict as a fundamental turning point, after which Rome was "effectively a new state masquerading under an old name".

Macrinus conspired to have Caracalla assassinated by one of his soldiers during a pilgrimage to the Temple of the Moon in Carrhae, in 217 AD. Macrinus assumed power, but soon removed himself from Rome to the east and Antioch. His brief reign ended in 218, when the youngster Bassianus, high priest of the temple of the Sun at Emesa, and supposedly illegitimate son of Caracalla, was declared Emperor by the disaffected soldiers of Macrinus. He adopted the name of Antoninus but history has named him after his Sun god Elagabalus, represented on Earth in the form of a large black stone. An incompetent and lascivious ruler, Elagabalus adopted his cousin Severus Alexander, as Caesar, but subsequently grew jealous and attempted to assassinate him. However, the Praetorian guard preferred Alexander, murdered Elagabalus, dragged his mutilated corpse through the streets of Rome, and threw it into the Tiber. Severus Alexander then succeeded him. Alexander waged war against many foes, including the revitalised Persia and also the Germanic peoples, who invaded Gaul. His losses generated dissatisfaction among his soldiers, and some of them murdered him during his Germanic campaign in 235 AD.

==== Crisis of the Third Century ====
The Roman Empire suffered internal schisms, forming the Palmyrene Empire and the Gallic Empire

A disastrous scenario emerged after the death of Alexander Severus: the Roman state was plagued by civil wars, external invasions, political chaos, pandemics and economic depression. The old Roman values had fallen, and Mithraism and Christianity had begun to spread through the populace. Emperors were no longer men linked with nobility; they usually were born in lower-classes of distant parts of the Empire. These men rose to prominence through military ranks, and became emperors through civil wars.

There were 26 emperors in a 49-year period, a signal of political instability. Maximinus Thrax was the first ruler of that time, governing for just three years. Others ruled just for a few months, like Gordian I, Gordian II, Balbinus and Hostilian. The population and the frontiers were abandoned, since the emperors were mostly concerned with defeating rivals and establishing their power. The economy also suffered: massive military expenditures from the Severi caused a devaluation of Roman coins. Hyperinflation came at this time as well. The Plague of Cyprian broke out in 250 and killed a huge portion of the population. In 260 AD, the provinces of Syria Palaestina, Asia Minor and Egypt separated from the rest of the Roman state to form the Palmyrene Empire, ruled by Queen Zenobia and centered on Palmyra. In that same year the Gallic Empire was created by Postumus, retaining Britannia and Gaul. These countries separated from Rome after the capture of emperor Valerian by the Sassanids of Persia, the first Roman ruler to be captured by his enemies; it was a humiliating fact for the Romans. The crisis began to recede during the reigns of Claudius Gothicus (268–270), who defeated the Gothic invaders, and Aurelian (271–275), who reconquered both the Gallic and Palmyrene Empires. The crisis was overcome during the reign of Diocletian.

=== Empire – The Tetrarchy ===
==== Diocletian ====
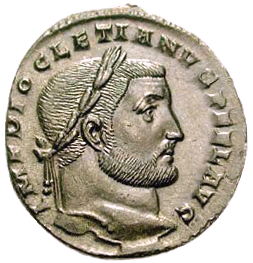
A Roman follis depicting the profile of Diocletian

In 284 AD, Diocletian was hailed as Imperator by the eastern army. Diocletian healed the empire from the crisis, by political and economic shifts. A new form of government was established: the Tetrarchy. The Empire was divided among four emperors, two in the West and two in the East. The first tetrarchs were Diocletian (in the East), Maximian (in the West), and two junior emperors, Galerius (in the East) and Flavius Constantius (in the West). To adjust the economy, Diocletian made several tax reforms.

Diocletian expelled the Persians who plundered Syria and conquered some barbarian tribes with Maximian. He adopted many behaviours of Eastern monarchs. Anyone in the presence of the emperor had now to prostrate himself—a common act in the East, but never practised in Rome before. Diocletian did not use a disguised form of Republic, as the other emperors since Augustus had done. Between 290 and 330, half a dozen new capitals had been established by the members of the Tetrarchy, officially or not: Antioch, Nicomedia, Thessalonike, Sirmium, Milan, and Trier. Diocletian was also responsible for a significant Christian persecution. In 303 he and Galerius started the persecution and ordered the destruction of all the Christian churches and scripts and forbade Christian worship. Diocletian abdicated in 305 AD together with Maximian, thus, he was the first Roman emperor to resign. His reign ended the traditional form of imperial rule, the Principate (from princeps) and started the Tetrarchy.

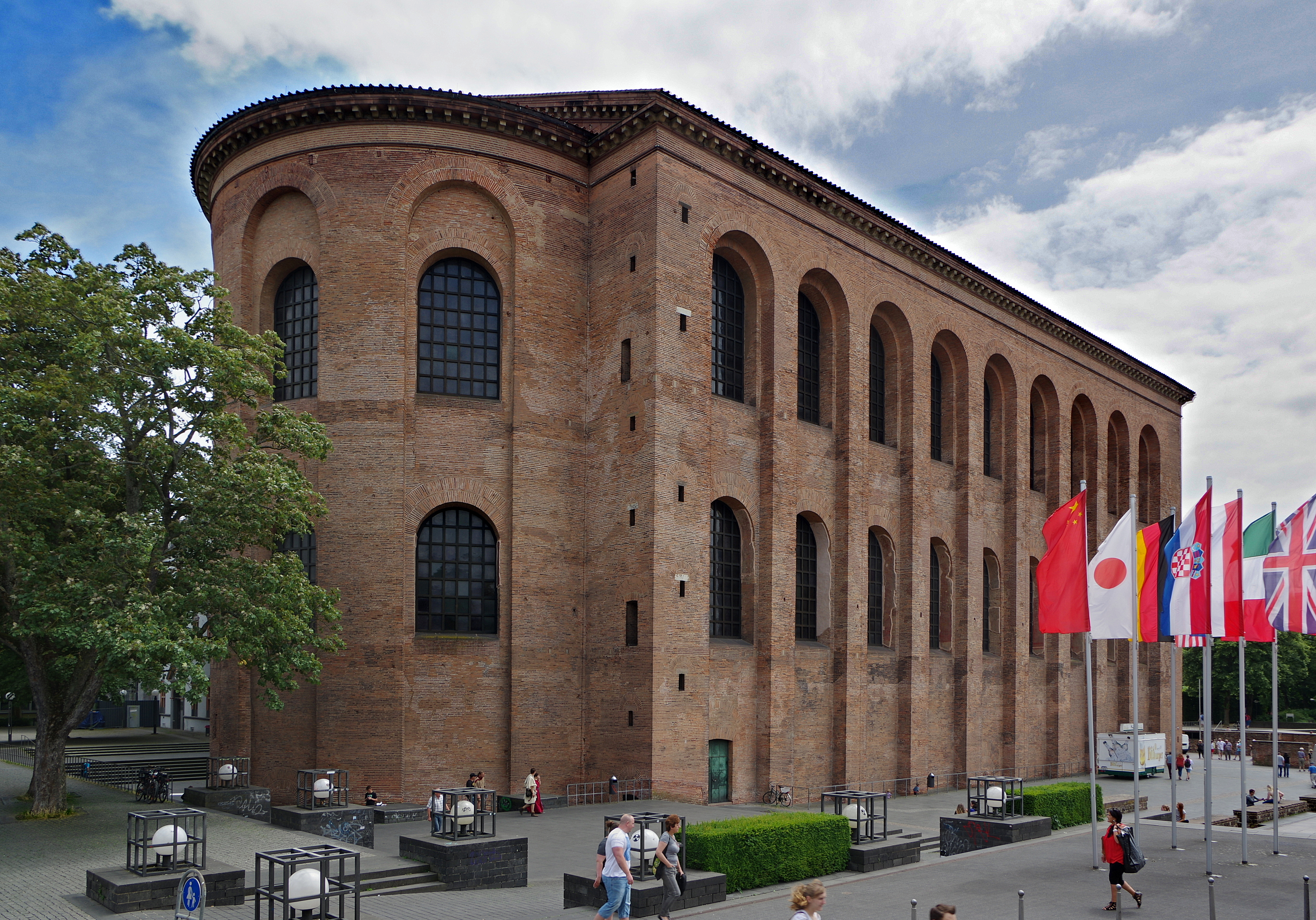
The Aula Palatina of Trier, Germany (then part of the Roman province of Gallia Belgica), a Christian basilica built during the reign of Constantine I (r. 306–337 AD)

==== Constantine and Christianity ====
Constantine assumed the empire as a tetrarch in 306. He conducted many wars against the other tetrarchs. Firstly he defeated Maxentius in 312. In 313, he issued the Edict of Milan, which granted liberty for Christians to profess their religion. Constantine was converted to Christianity, enforcing the Christian faith. He began the Christianization of the Empire and of Europe—a process concluded by the Catholic Church in the Middle Ages. He was defeated by the Franks and the Alamanni during 306–308. In 324 he defeated another tetrarch, Licinius, and controlled all the empire, as it was before Diocletian. To celebrate his victories and Christianity's relevance, he rebuilt Byzantium and renamed it Nova Roma ("New Rome"); but the city soon gained the informal name of Constantinople ("City of Constantine").

The reign of Julian, who under the influence of his adviser Mardonius attempted to restore Classical Roman and Hellenistic religion, only briefly interrupted the succession of Christian emperors. Constantinople served as a new capital for the Empire. In fact, Rome had lost its central importance since the Crisis of the Third Century—Mediolanum was the western capital from 286 to 330, until the reign of Honorius, when Ravenna was made capital, in the 5th century. Constantine's administrative and monetary reforms, that reunited the Empire under one emperor, and rebuilt the city of Byzantium, as Constantinopolis Nova Roma, changed the high period of the ancient world.

=== Fall of the Western Roman Empire ===
In the late 4th and 5th centuries the Western Empire entered a critical stage which terminated with the fall of the Western Roman Empire. Under the last emperors of the Constantinian dynasty and the Valentinianic dynasty, Rome lost decisive battles against the Sasanian Empire and Germanic barbarians: in 363, emperor Julian the Apostate was killed in the Battle of Samarra, against the Persians and the Battle of Adrianople cost the life of emperor Valens (364–378); the victorious Goths were never expelled from the Empire nor assimilated. The next emperor, Theodosius I (379–395), gave even more force to the Christian faith, and after his death, the Empire was divided into the Eastern Roman Empire, ruled by Arcadius and the Western Roman Empire, commanded by Honorius, both of which were Theodosius' sons.

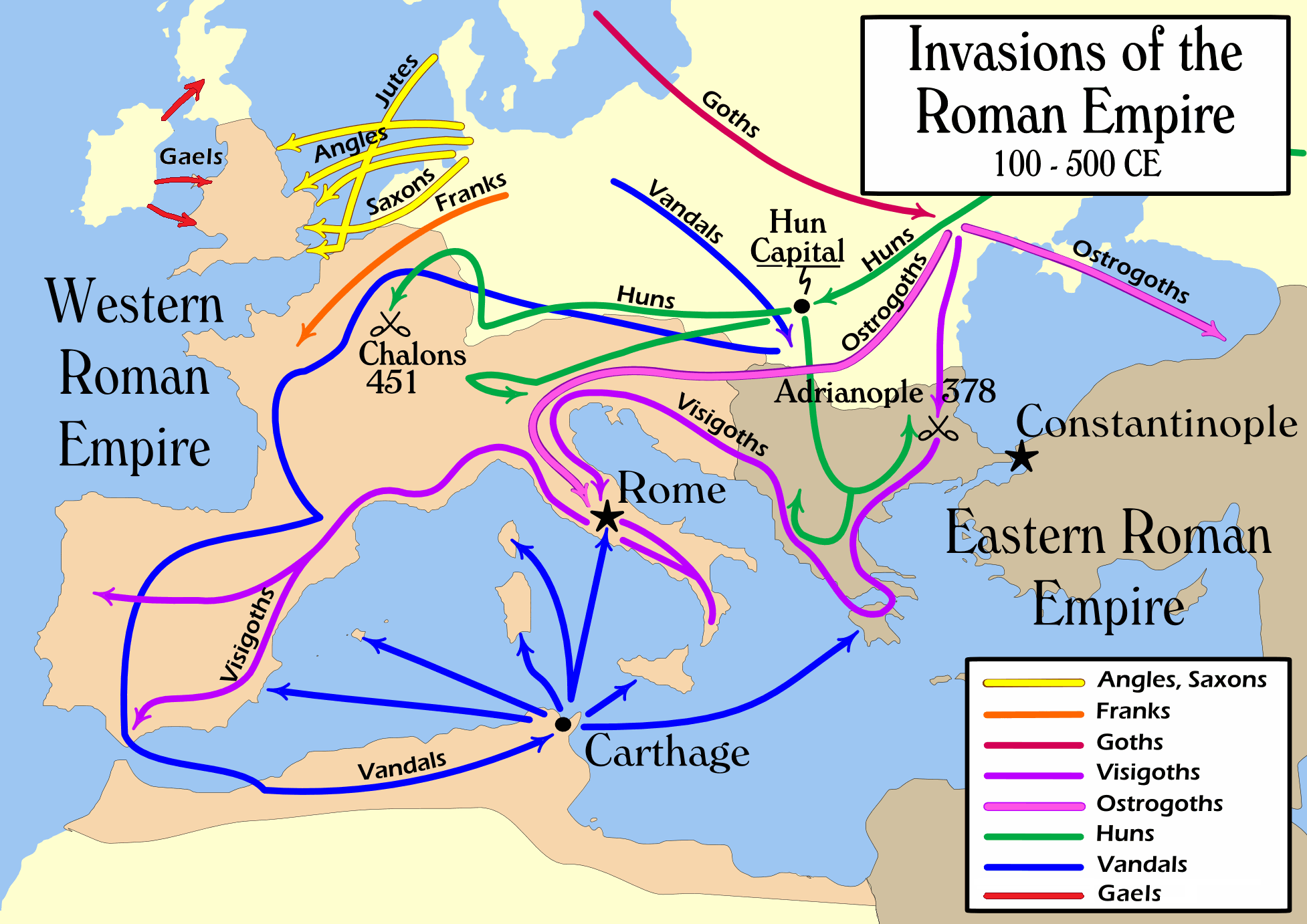
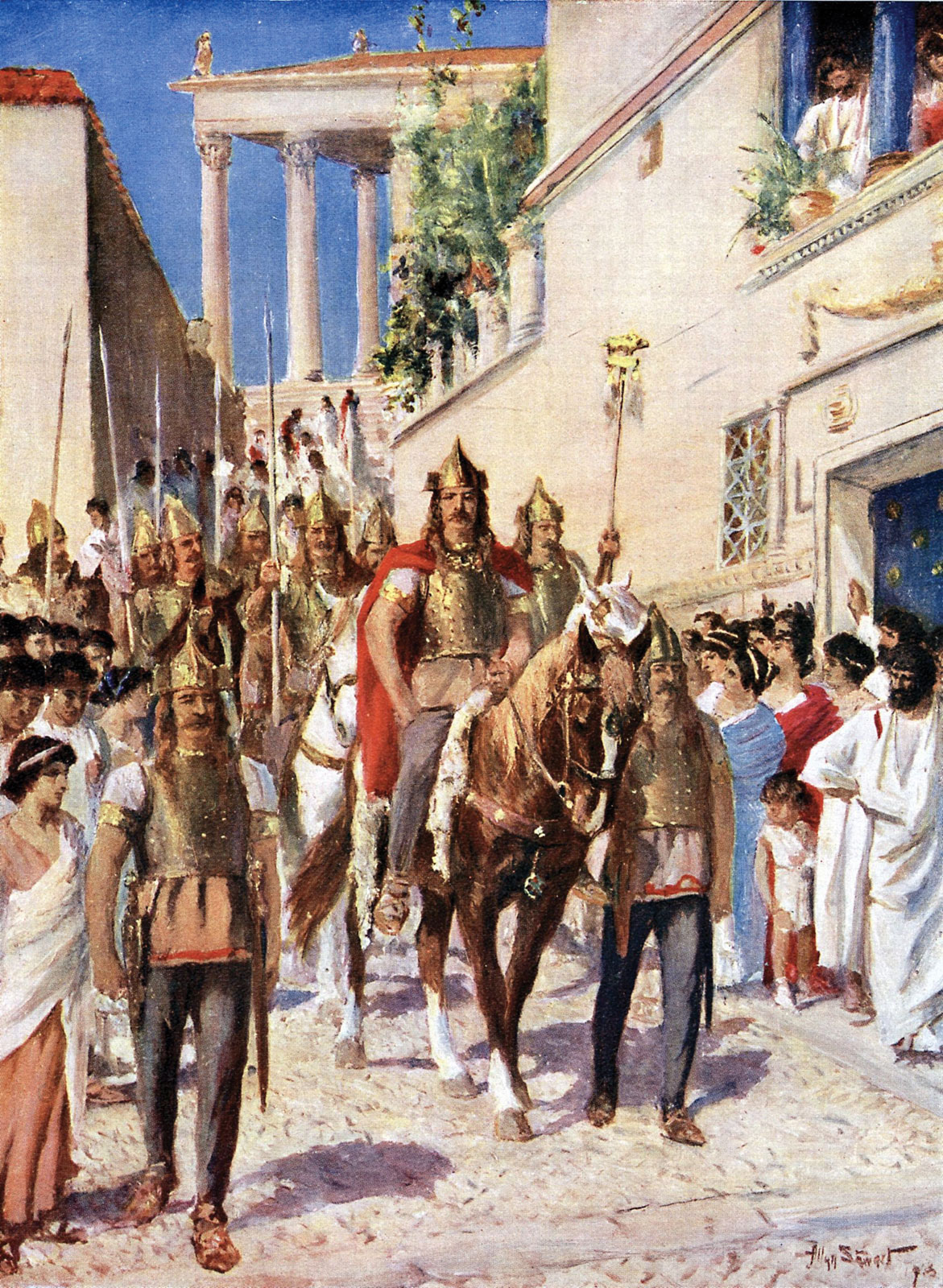
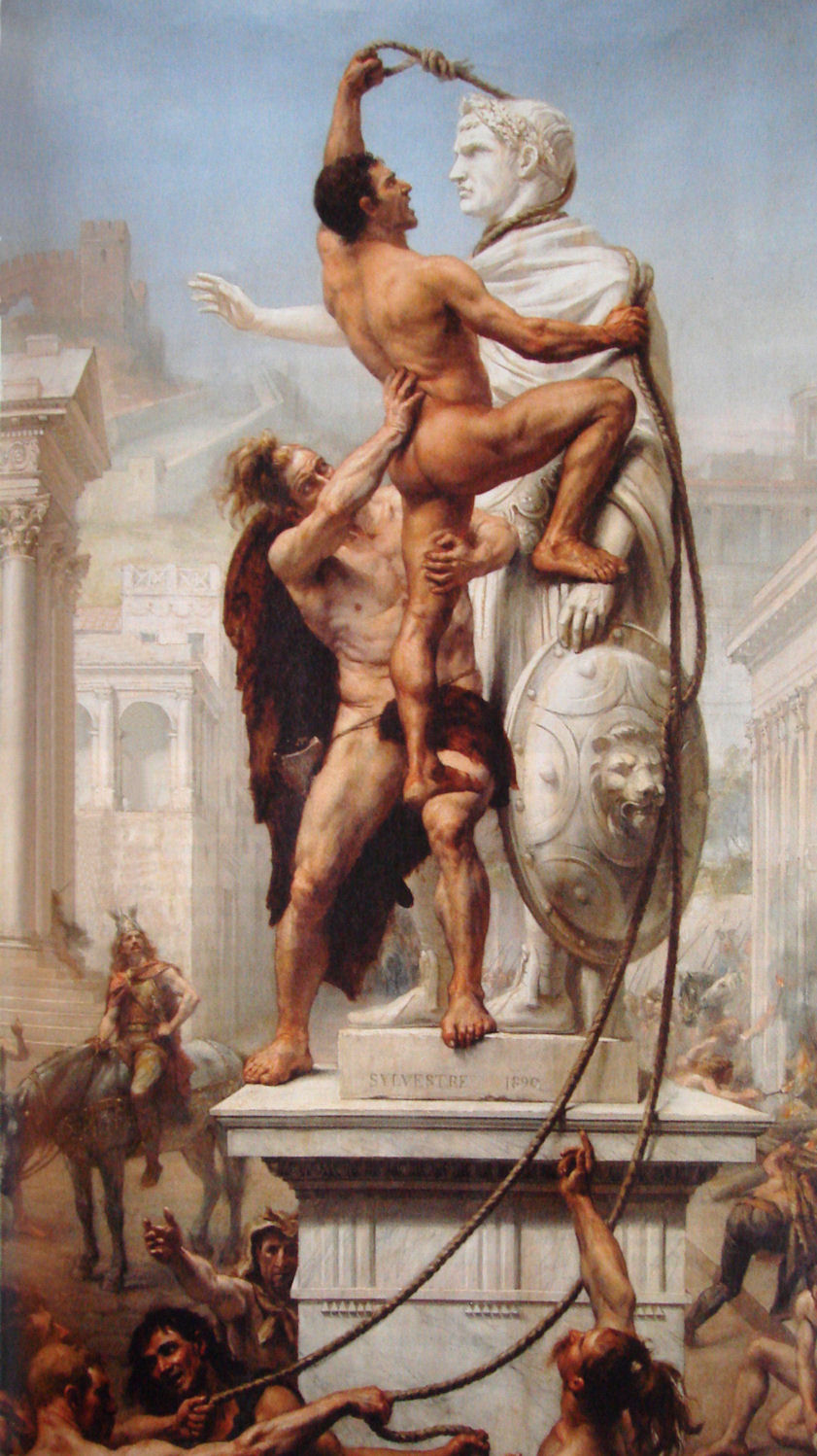
Ending invasions on Roman Empire between AD 100–500. Visigoths entering Athens. The Sack of Rome by the Barbarians in 410 by Joseph-Noël Sylvestre.

The situation became more critical in 408, after the death of Stilicho, a general who tried to reunite the Empire and repel barbarian invasion in the early years of the 5th century. The professional field army collapsed. In 410, the Theodosian dynasty saw the Visigoths sack Rome. During the 5th century, the Western Empire experienced a significant reduction of its territory. The Vandals conquered North Africa, the Visigoths claimed the southern part of Gaul, Gallaecia was taken by the Suebi, Britannia was abandoned by the central government, and the Empire suffered further from the invasions of Attila, chief of the Huns. General Orestes refused to meet the demands of the barbarian "allies" who now formed the army, and tried to expel them from Italy. Unhappy with this, their chieftain Odoacer defeated and killed Orestes, invaded Ravenna and dethroned Romulus Augustus, son of Orestes. This event of 476, usually marks the end of Classical antiquity and beginning of the Middle Ages. The Roman noble and former emperor Julius Nepos continued to rule as emperor from Dalmatia even after the deposition of Romulus Augustus until his death in 480. Some historians consider him to be the last emperor of the Western Empire instead of Romulus Augustus.

After 1200 years of independence and nearly 700 years as a great power, the rule of Rome in the West ended. Various reasons for Rome's fall have been proposed, including loss of Republicanism, moral decay, military tyranny, class war, slavery, economic stagnation, environmental change, disease, the decline of the Roman race, as well as the inevitable ebb and flow that all civilisations experience. The Eastern Empire survived for almost 1000 years after the fall of its Western counterpart and became the most stable Christian realm during the Middle Ages. During the 6th century, Justinian reconquered the Italian peninsula from the Ostrogoths, North Africa from the Vandals, and southern Hispania from the Visigoths. But within a few years of Justinian's death, Byzantine possessions in Italy were greatly reduced by the Lombards who settled in the peninsula. In the east, partially due to the weakening effect of the Plague of Justinian as well as a series of mutually destructive wars against the Persian Sassanian Empire, the Byzantines were threatened by the rise of Islam. Its followers rapidly brought about the conquest of the Levant, the conquest of North Africa and the conquest of Egypt during the Arab–Byzantine wars, and soon presented a direct threat to Constantinople. In the following century, the Arabs captured southern Italy and Sicily. In the west, Slavic populations penetrated deep into the Balkans.

The Byzantine Romans, however, managed to stop further Islamic expansion into their lands during the 8th century and, beginning in the 9th century, reclaimed parts of the conquered lands. In 1000 AD, the Eastern Empire was at its height: Basil II reconquered Bulgaria and Armenia, and culture and trade flourished. However, soon after, this expansion was abruptly stopped in 1071 with the Byzantine defeat in the Battle of Manzikert. The aftermath of this battle sent the empire into a protracted period of decline. Two decades of internal strife and Turkic invasions ultimately led Emperor Alexios I Komnenos to send a call for help to the Western European kingdoms in 1095. The West responded with the Crusades, eventually resulting in the Sack of Constantinople by participants of the Fourth Crusade. The conquest of Constantinople in 1204 fragmented what remained of the Empire into successor states; the ultimate victor was the Empire of Nicaea. After the recapture of Constantinople by Imperial forces, the Empire was little more than a Greek state confined to the Aegean coast. The Eastern Roman (Byzantine) Empire collapsed when Mehmed the Conqueror conquered Constantinople on 29 May 1453.

== Society ==
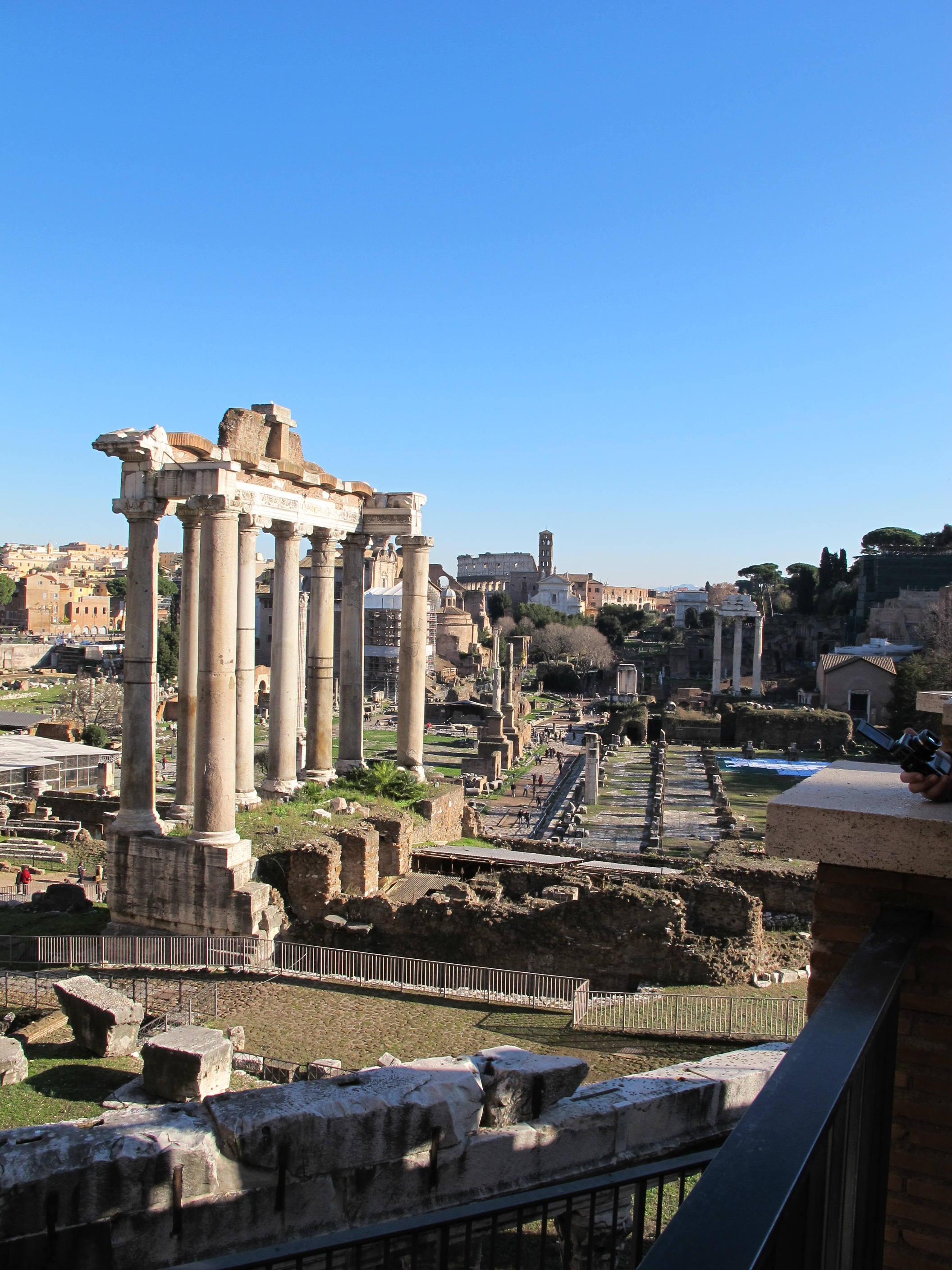
The Roman Forum, the political, economic, cultural, and religious centre of the city during the Republic and later Empire

The imperial city of Rome was the largest urban centre in the empire, with a population variously estimated from 450,000 to close to one million. Around 20% of the population under jurisdiction of ancient Rome (25–40%, depending on the standards used, in Roman Italy) lived in innumerable urban centres, with population of 10,000 and more and several military settlements, a very high rate of urbanisation by pre-industrial standards. Most of those centres had a forum, temples, and other buildings similar to Rome's. The average life expectancy in the Middle Empire was about 26–28 years.

=== Law ===
The roots of the legal principles and practices of the ancient Romans may be traced to the Law of the Twelve Tables promulgated in 449 BC and to the codification of law issued by order of Emperor Justinian I around 530 AD (see Corpus Juris Civilis). Roman law, as preserved in Justinian's codes, continued into the Byzantine Roman Empire and formed the basis of similar codifications in continental Western Europe. Roman law continued, in a broader sense, to be applied throughout most of Europe until the end of the 17th century.

The major divisions of the law of ancient Rome, as contained within the Justinian and Theodosian law codes, consisted of Jus civile, Jus gentium, and Jus naturale. The Jus civile ('citizen law') was the body of common laws that applied to Roman citizens. The praetores urbani (sing. Praetor Urbanus) were the people who had jurisdiction over cases involving citizens. The Jus gentium ('law of nations') was the body of common laws that applied to foreigners and their dealings with Roman citizens. The praetores peregrini (sing. Praetor Peregrinus) were the people who had jurisdiction over cases involving citizens and foreigners. Jus naturale encompassed natural law, the body of laws that were considered common to all beings.

=== Class structure ===
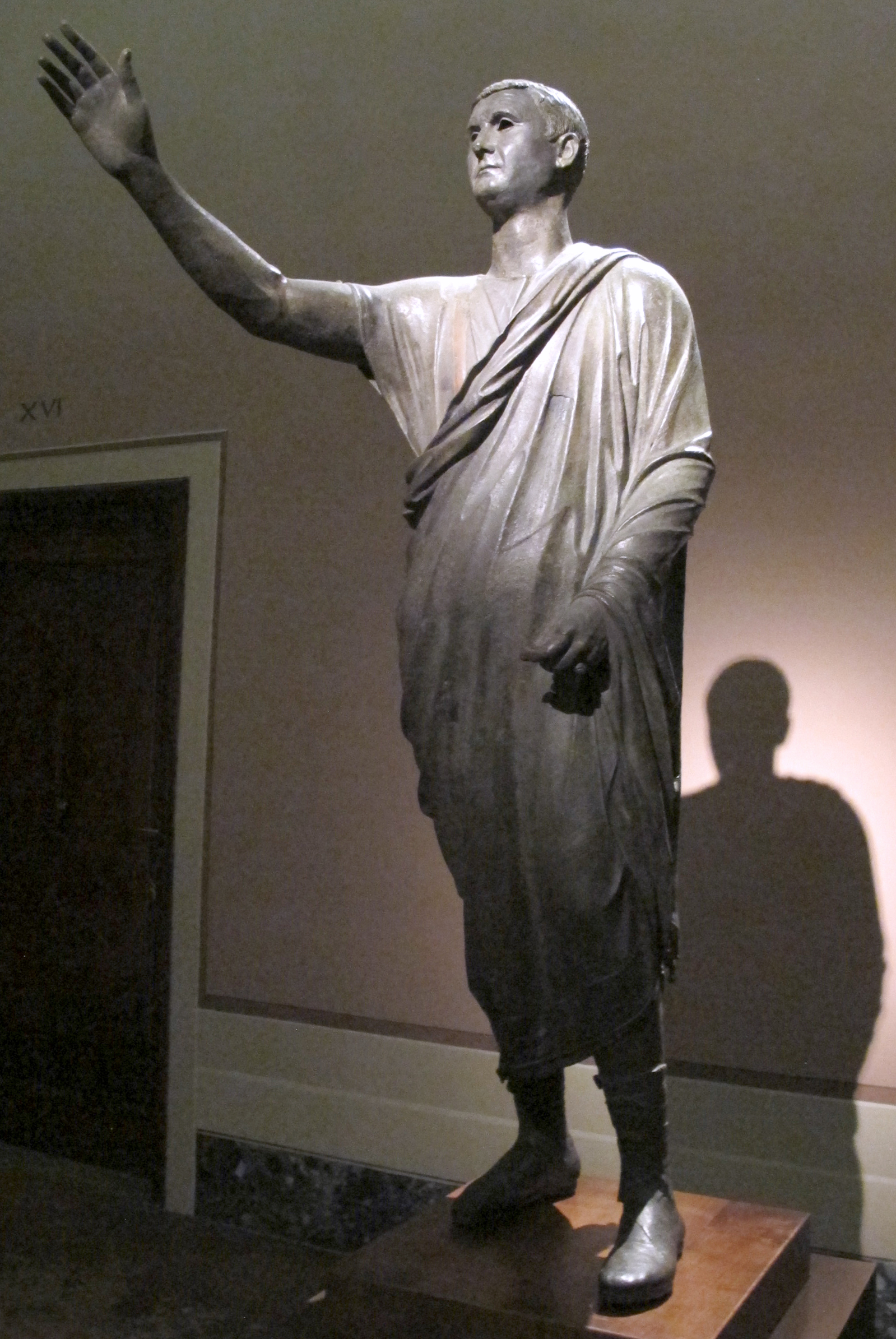
The Orator, c. 100 BC, from the National Archaeological Museum of Florence, Italy, an Etrusco-Roman bronze statue depicting Aule Metele (Latin: Aulus Metellus), an Etruscan man wearing a Roman toga while engaged in rhetoric; the statue features an inscription in the Etruscan language

Roman society is largely viewed as hierarchical, with slaves (servi) at the bottom, freedmen (liberti) above them, and free-born citizens (cives) at the top. Free citizens were subdivided by class. The broadest, and earliest, division was between the patricians, who could trace their ancestry to one of the 100 patriarchs at the founding of the city, and the plebeians, who could not. This became less important in the later Republic, as some plebeian families became wealthy and entered politics, and some patrician families fell economically. Anyone, patrician or plebeian, who could count a consul as his ancestor was a noble (nobilis); a man who was the first of his family to hold the consulship, such as Marius or Cicero, was known as a novus homo ('new man') and ennobled his descendants. Patrician ancestry, however, still conferred considerable prestige, and many religious offices remained restricted to patricians.

A class division originally based on military service became more important. Membership of these classes was determined periodically by the censors, according to property. The wealthiest were the Senatorial class, who dominated politics and command of the army. Next came the equestrians (equites, sometimes translated "knights"), originally those who could afford a warhorse, and who formed a powerful mercantile class. Several further classes, originally based on the military equipment their members could afford, followed, with the proletarii, citizens who had no property other than their children, at the bottom. Before the reforms of Marius they were ineligible for military service and are often described as being just above freed slaves in wealth and prestige.

Voting power in the Republic depended on class. Citizens were enrolled in voting "tribes", but the tribes of the richer classes had fewer members than the poorer ones, all the proletarii being enrolled in a single tribe. Voting was done in class order, from top down, and stopped as soon as most of the tribes had been reached, so the poorer classes were often unable to cast their votes.

Women in ancient Rome shared some basic rights with their male counterparts, but were not fully regarded as citizens and were thus not allowed to vote or take part in politics. At the same time the limited rights of women were gradually expanded (due to emancipation) and women reached freedom from pater familias, gained property rights and even had more juridical rights than their husbands, but still no voting rights, and were absent from politics.

Allied foreign cities were often given the Latin Rights, an intermediary level between full citizens and foreigners (peregrini), which gave their citizens rights under Roman law and allowed their leading magistrates to become full Roman citizens. While there were varying degrees of Latin rights, the main division was between those cum suffragio ('with vote'; enrolled in a Roman tribe and able to take part in the comitia tributa) and sine suffragio ('without vote'; could not take part in Roman politics). Most of Rome's Italian allies were given full citizenship after the Social War of 91–88 BC, and full Roman citizenship was extended to all free-born men in the Empire by Caracalla in 212, with the exception of the dediticii, people who had become subject to Rome through surrender in war, and freed slaves.

=== Education ===
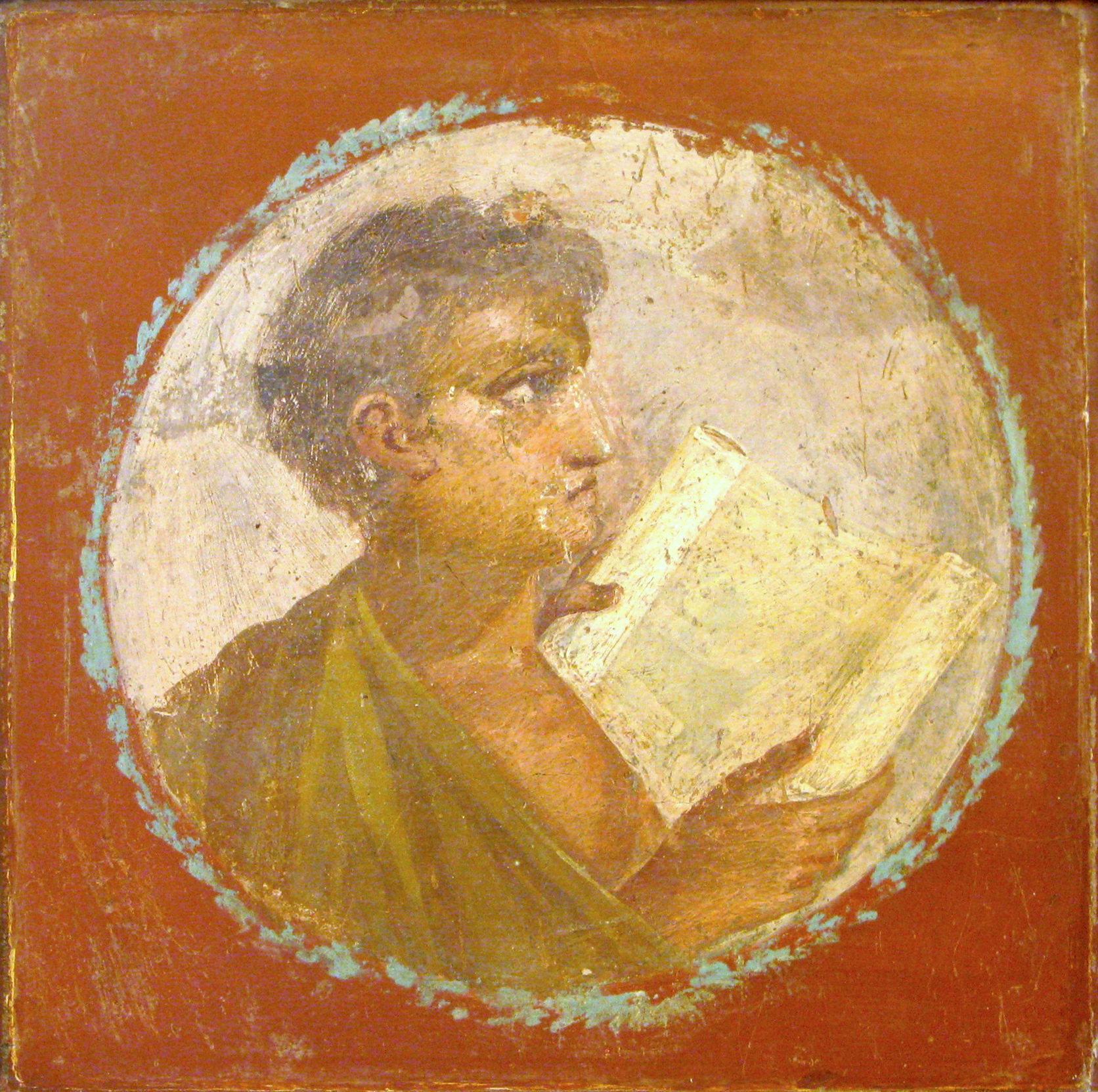
Roman portraiture fresco of a young man with a papyrus scroll, from Herculaneum, 1st century AD

In the early Republic, there were no public schools, so boys were taught to read and write by their parents, or by educated slaves, called paedagogi, usually of Greek origin. The primary aim of education during this period was to train young men in agriculture, warfare, Roman traditions, and public affairs. Young boys learned much about civic life by accompanying their fathers to religious and political functions, including the Senate for the sons of nobles. The sons of nobles were apprenticed to a prominent political figure at the age of 16, and campaigned with the army from the age of 17. Educational practices were modified after the conquest of the Hellenistic kingdoms in the 3rd century BC and the resulting Greek influence, although Roman educational practices were still much different from Greek ones. If their parents could afford it, boys and some girls at the age of 7 were sent to a private school outside the home called a ludus, where a teacher (called a litterator or a magister ludi, and often of Greek origin) taught them basic reading, writing, arithmetic, and sometimes Greek, until the age of 11.

Beginning at age 12, students went to secondary schools, where the teacher (now called a grammaticus) taught them about Greek and Roman literature. At the age of 16, some students went on to rhetoric school (where the teacher, usually Greek, was called a rhetor). Education at this level prepared students for legal careers, and required that the students memorise the laws of Rome.

=== Government ===
Initially, Rome was ruled by kings, who were elected from each of Rome's major tribes in turn. The exact nature of the king's power is uncertain. He may have held near-absolute power, or may have merely been the chief executive of the Senate and the people. In military matters, the king's authority (Imperium) was likely absolute. He was also the head of the state religion. In addition to the authority of the King, there were three administrative assemblies: the Senate, which acted as an advisory body for the King; the Comitia Curiata, which could endorse and ratify laws suggested by the King; and the Comitia Calata, which was an assembly of the priestly college that could assemble the people to bear witness to certain acts, hear proclamations, and declare the feast and holiday schedule for the next month.

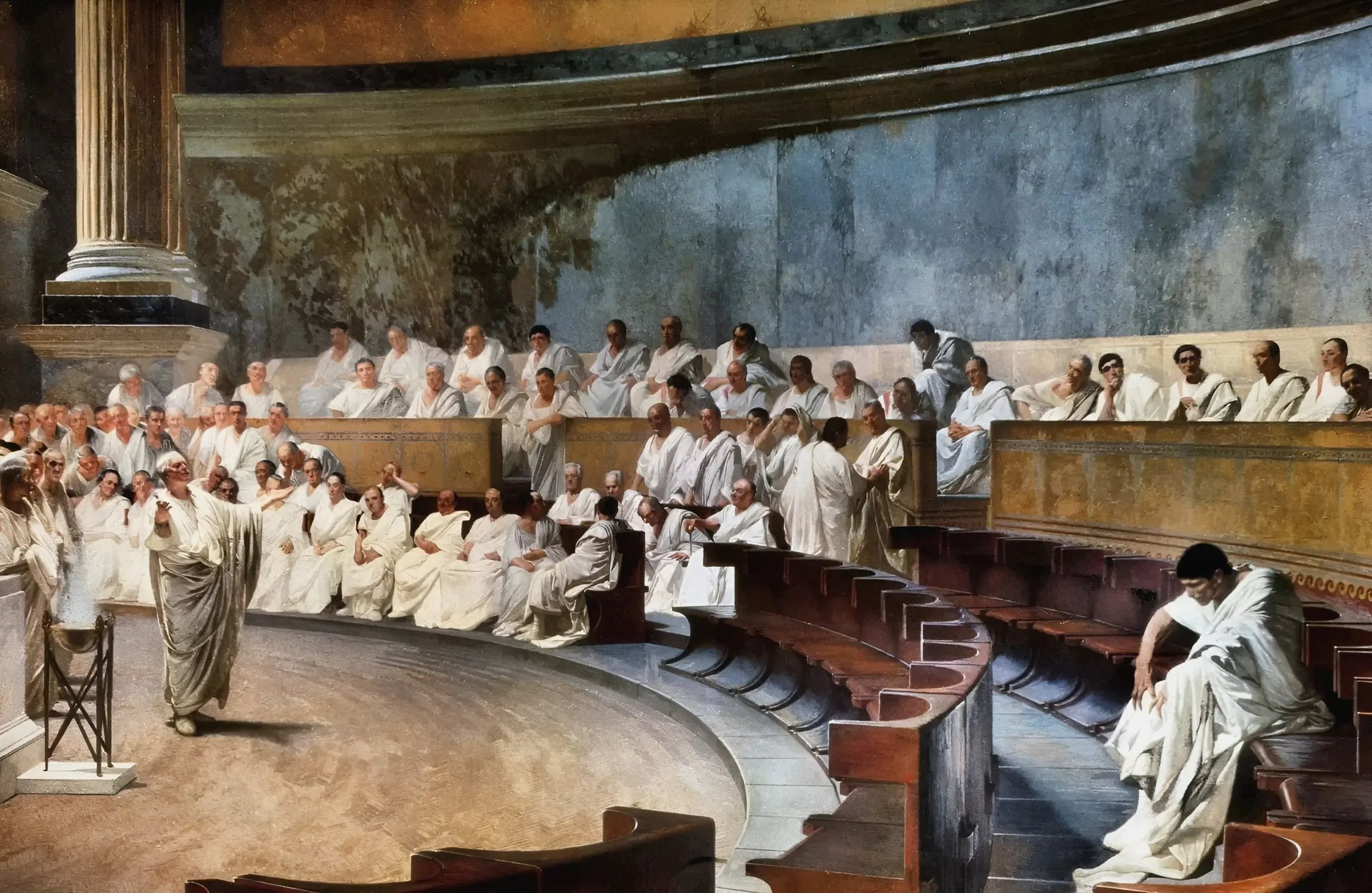
Representation of a sitting of the Roman Senate: Cicero attacks Catilina, from a 19th-century fresco by Cesare Maccari, in Palazzo Madama, home to Italy's Senate

The class struggles of the Roman Republic resulted in an unusual mixture of democracy and oligarchy. The word republic comes from the Latin res publica, which literally translates to 'public business'. Roman laws traditionally could only be passed by a vote of the Popular assembly (Comitia Tributa). Likewise, candidates for public positions had to run for election by the people. However, the Roman Senate represented an oligarchic institution, which acted as an advisory body.

In the Republic, the Senate held actual authority (auctoritas), but no real legislative power; it was technically only an advisory council. However, as the Senators were individually very influential, it was difficult to accomplish anything against the collective will of the Senate. New senators were chosen from among the most accomplished patricians by censors (Censura), who could also remove a senator from his office if he was found "morally corrupt". Later, under the reforms of the dictator Sulla, quaestors were made automatic members of the Senate, though most of his reforms did not survive.

The Republic had no fixed bureaucracy, and collected taxes through the practice of tax farming. Government positions such as quaestor, aedile, or praefect were funded by the office-holder. To prevent any citizen from gaining too much power, new magistrates were elected annually and had to share power with a colleague. For example, under normal conditions, the highest authority was held by two consuls. In an emergency, a temporary dictator could be appointed. Throughout the Republic, the administrative system was revised several times to comply with new demands. In the end, it proved inefficient for controlling the ever-expanding dominion of Rome, contributing to the establishment of the Roman Empire.

In the early Empire, the pretence of a republican form of government was maintained. The Roman emperor was portrayed as only a princeps, or 'first citizen', and the Senate gained legislative power and all legal authority previously held by the popular assemblies. However, the rule of the Emperors became increasingly autocratic, and the Senate was reduced to an advisory body appointed by the Emperor. The Empire did not inherit a set bureaucracy from the Republic, since the Republic did not have any permanent governmental structures apart from the Senate. The Emperor appointed assistants and advisers, but the state lacked many institutions, such as a centrally planned budget. Some historians have cited this as a significant reason for the decline of the Roman Empire.

=== Military ===
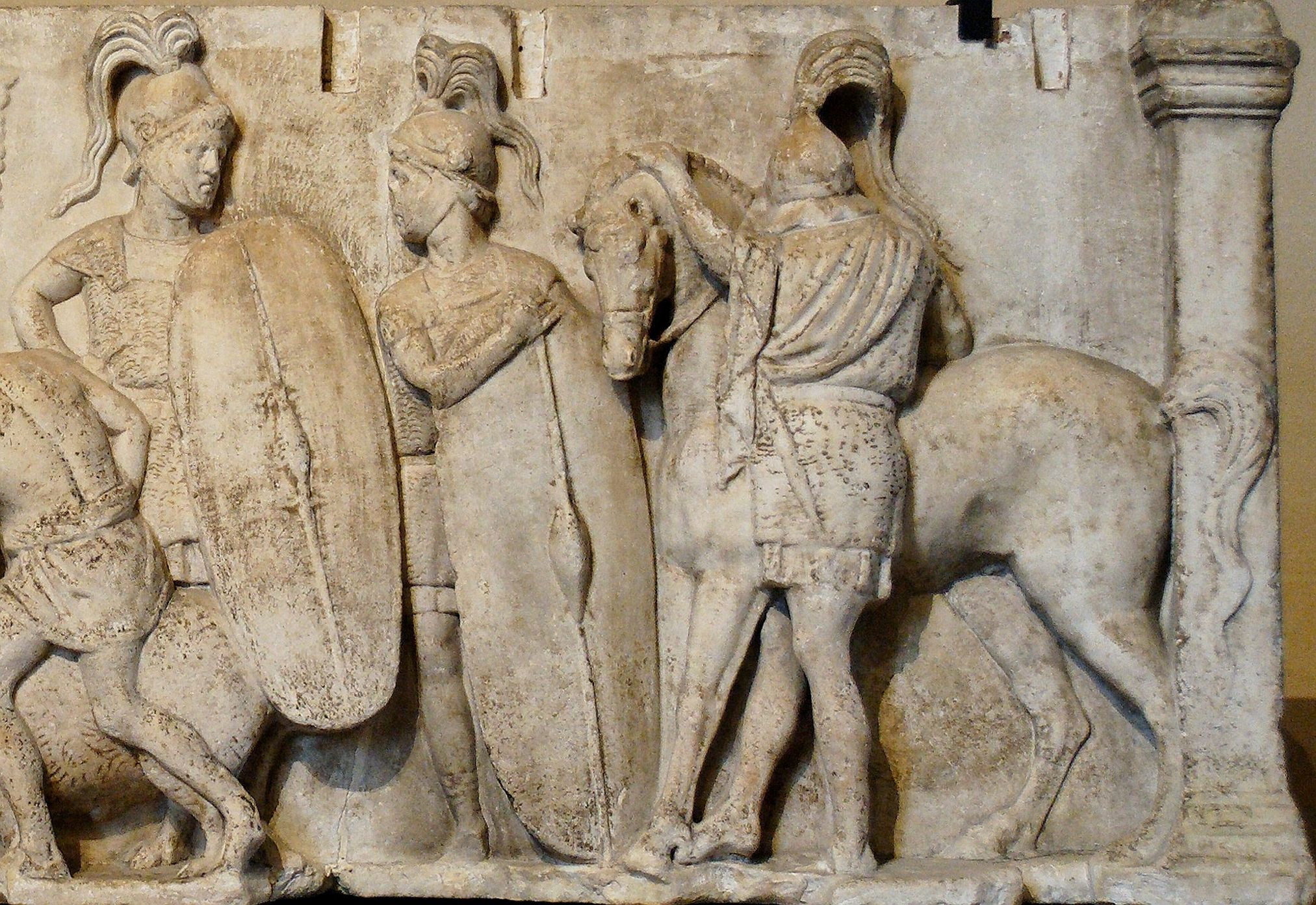
Altar of Domitius Ahenobarbus, c. 122 BC; the altar shows two Roman infantrymen equipped with long scuta and a cavalryman with his horse. All are shown wearing chain mail armour.

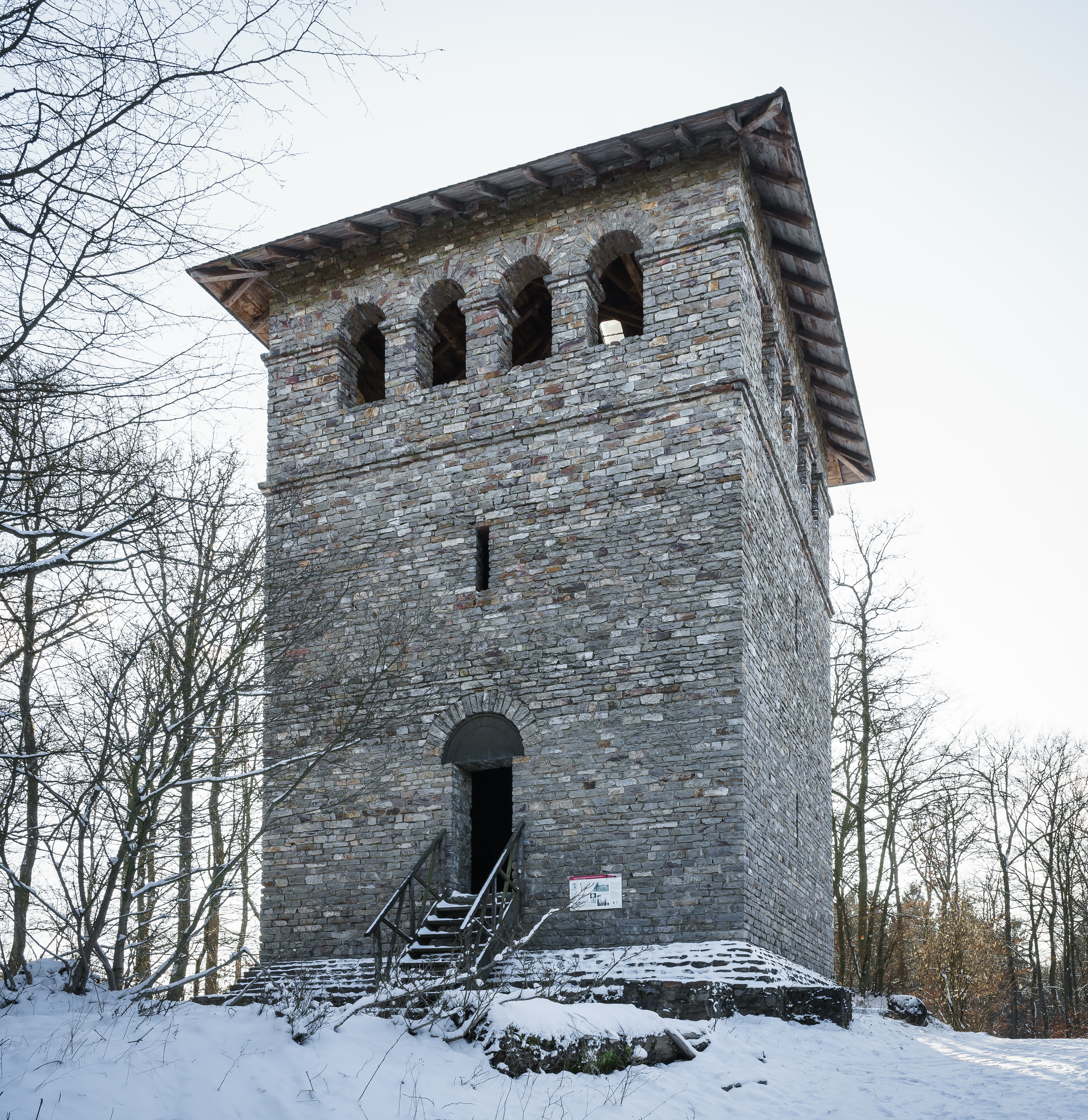
Roman tower (reconstruction) at Limes – Taunus / Germany

The early Roman army (c. 500 BC) was, like those of other contemporary city-states influenced by Greek civilisation, a citizen militia that practised hoplite tactics. It was small and organised in five classes (in parallel to the comitia centuriata, the body of citizens organised politically), with three providing hoplites and two providing light infantry. The early Roman army was tactically limited and its stance during this period was essentially defensive. (Note: For a discussion of hoplite tactics and their sociocultural setting, see Victor Hanson's 1989 work.)

By the 3rd century BC, the Romans abandoned the hoplite formation in favour of a more flexible system in which smaller groups of 120 (or sometimes 60) men called 'maniples could manoeuvre more independently on the battlefield. Thirty maniples arranged in three lines with supporting troops constituted a legion, totalling between 4,000 and 5,000 men. The early Republican legion consisted of five sections: manipular heavy infantry (hastati, principes and triarii), a force of light infantry (velites), and the cavalry (equites). With the new organisation came a new orientation toward the offensive and a much more aggressive posture toward adjoining city-states.

Until the late Republican period, the typical legionary was a property-owning citizen farmer from a rural area (an adsiduus) who served for particular (often annual) campaigns, (Note: Between 343 and 241 BC, the Roman army fought in every year but five.) and who supplied his own equipment. After 200 BC, economic conditions in rural areas deteriorated as manpower needs increased, so that the property qualifications for compulsory service were gradually reduced. Beginning in the 3rd century BC, legionaries were paid a stipend. By the time of Augustus, the ideal of the citizen-soldier had been abandoned and the legions had become fully professional. At the end of the Civil War, Augustus reorganised Roman military forces, discharging soldiers and disbanding legions. He retained 28 legions, distributed through the provinces of the Empire. (Note: The historian Mackay points out that the number of legions grew to 30 by 125 AD and 33 during the Severan period (200–235 AD).)

During the Principate, the tactical organisation of the Army continued to evolve. The auxilia remained independent cohorts, and legionary troops often operated as groups of cohorts rather than as full legions. A new and versatile type of unit, the cohortes equitatae, combined cavalry and legionaries in a single formation. They could be stationed at garrisons or outposts and could fight on their own as balanced small forces or combine with similar units as a larger, legion-sized force. This increase in organizational flexibility helped ensure the long-term success of Roman military forces. The Emperor Gallienus (253–268 AD) began a reorganisation that created the last military structure of the late Empire. Withdrawing some legionaries from the fixed bases on the border, Gallienus created mobile forces (the comitatenses, or field armies) and stationed them behind and at some distance from the borders as a strategic reserve. The border troops (limitanei) stationed at fixed bases continued to be the first line of defence. The basic units of the field army were regimental; legiones or auxilia for infantry and vexillationes for cavalry. Nominal strengths may have been 1,200 men for infantry regiments and 600 for cavalry, but actual troop levels could have been much lower—800 infantry and 400 cavalry. Many infantry and cavalry regiments operated in pairs under the command of a comes. Field armies included regiments recruited from allied tribes and known as foederati. By 400 AD, foederati regiments had become permanently established units of the Roman army, paid and equipped by the Empire, led by a Roman tribune and used just as Roman units were used. The Empire also used groups of barbarians to fight along with the legions as allies without integration into the field armies, under overall command of a Roman general, but led by their own officers.

Military leadership evolved over the course of the history of Rome. Under the monarchy, the hoplite armies were led by the kings. During the early and middle Roman Republic, military forces were under the command of one of the two elected consuls for the year. During the later Republic, members of the Roman Senatorial elite, as part of the normal sequence of elected public offices known as the cursus honorum, would have served first as quaestor (often posted as deputies to field commanders), then as praetor. Following the end of a term as praetor or consul, a Senator might be appointed by the Senate as a propraetor or proconsul (depending on the highest office held before) to govern a foreign province. Under Augustus, whose most important political priority was to place the military under a permanent and unitary command, the Emperor was the legal commander of each legion but exercised that command through a legatus (legate) he appointed from the Senatorial elite. In a province with a single legion, the legate commanded the legion (legatus legionis) and served as provincial governor, while in a province with more than one legion, each legion was commanded by a legate and the legates were commanded by the provincial governor (also a legate but of higher rank).

During the later stages of the Imperial period (beginning perhaps with Diocletian), the Augustan model was abandoned. Provincial governors were stripped of military authority, and command of the armies in a group of provinces was given to generals (duces) appointed by the Emperor. These were no longer members of the Roman elite but men who came up through the ranks and had seen much practical soldiering. With increasing frequency, these men attempted (sometimes successfully) to usurp the positions of the Emperors. Decreased resources, increasing political chaos and civil war eventually left the Western Empire vulnerable to attack and takeover by neighbouring barbarian peoples.

==== Roman navy ====
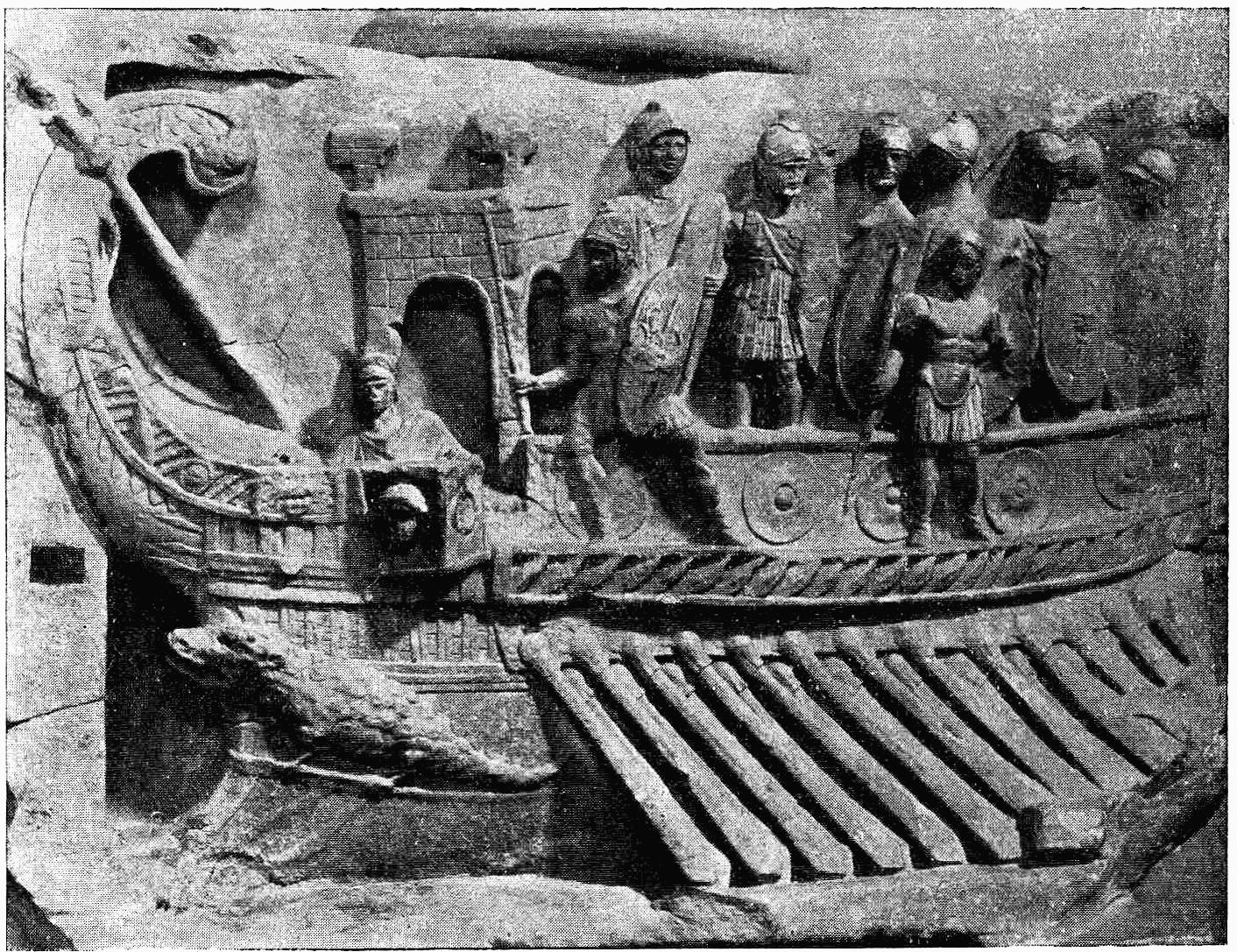
A Roman naval bireme depicted in a relief from the Temple of Fortuna Primigenia in Praeneste (Palastrina), which was built c. 120 BC; exhibited in the Pius-Clementine Museum (Museo Pio-Clementino) in the Vatican Museums.

Less is known about the Roman navy than the Roman army. Prior to the middle of the 3rd century BC, officials known as duumviri navales commanded a fleet of twenty ships used mainly to control piracy. This fleet was given up in 278 AD and replaced by allied forces. The First Punic War required that Rome build large fleets, and it did so largely with the assistance of and financing from allies. This reliance on allies continued to the end of the Roman Republic. The quinquereme was the main warship on both sides of the Punic Wars and remained the mainstay of Roman naval forces until replaced by the time of Caesar Augustus by lighter and more manoeuvrable vessels.

As compared with a trireme, the quinquereme permitted the use of a mix of experienced and inexperienced crewmen (an advantage for a primarily land-based power), and its lesser manoeuvrability permitted the Romans to adopt and perfect boarding tactics using a troop of about 40 marines in lieu of the ram. Ships were commanded by a navarch, a rank equal to a centurion, who was usually not a citizen. Potter suggests that because the fleet was dominated by non-Romans, the navy was considered non-Roman and allowed to atrophy in times of peace.

Information suggests that by the time of the late Empire (350 AD), the Roman navy comprised several fleets including warships and merchant vessels for transportation and supply. Warships were oared sailing galleys with three to five banks of oarsmen. Fleet bases included such ports as Ravenna, Arles, Aquilea, Misenum and the mouth of the Somme River in the West and Alexandria and Rhodes in the East. Flotillas of small river craft (classes) were part of the limitanei (border troops) during this period, based at fortified river harbours along the Rhine and the Danube. That prominent generals commanded both armies and fleets suggests that naval forces were treated as auxiliaries to the army and not as an independent service. The details of command structure and fleet strengths during this period are not well known, although fleets were commanded by prefects.

=== Economy ===
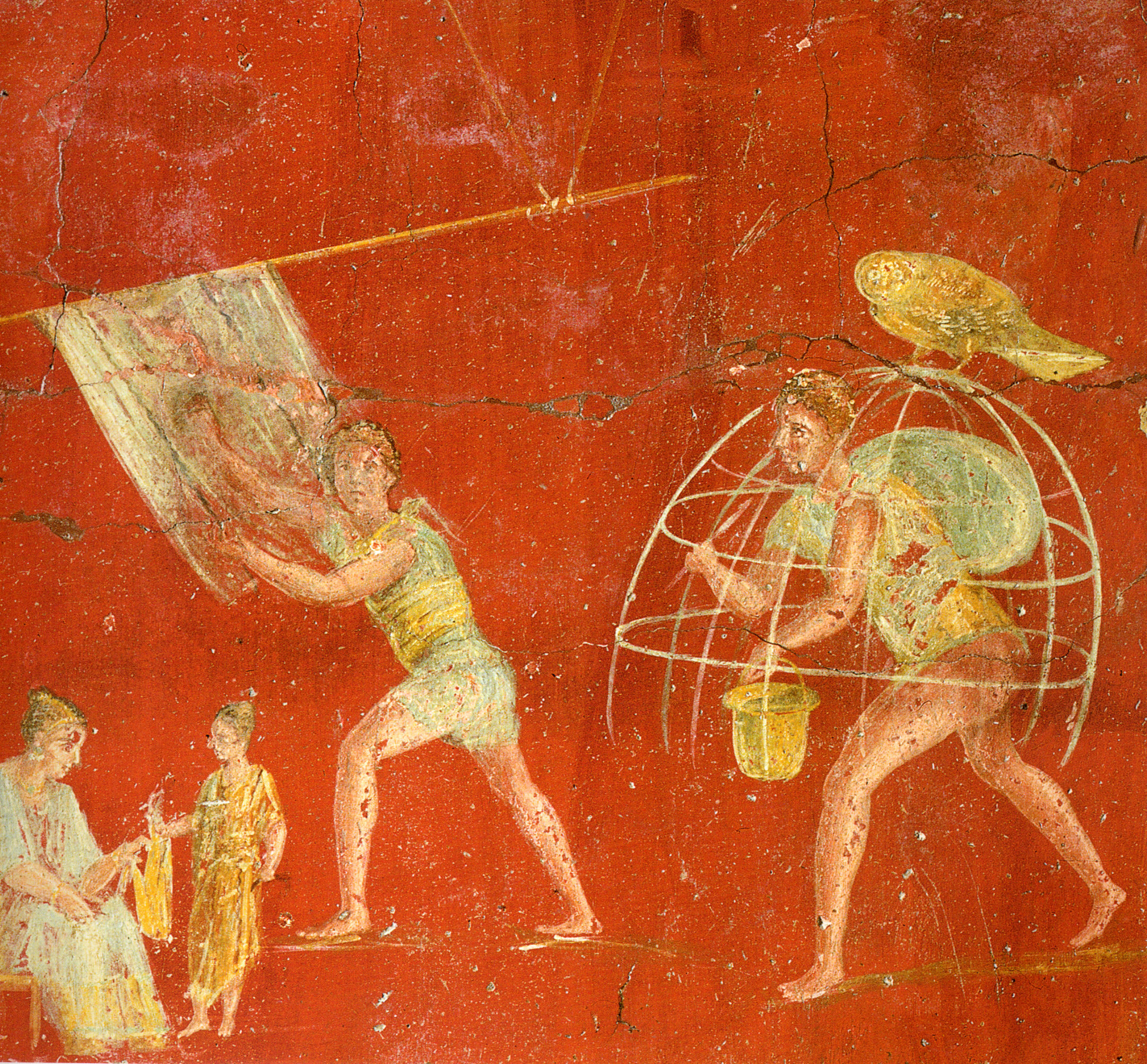
Workers at a cloth-processing shop, in a painting from the 'fullonica of Veranius Hypsaeus in Pompeii

Ancient Rome commanded a vast area of land, with tremendous natural and human resources. As such, Rome's economy remained focused on farming and trade. Agricultural free trade changed the Italian landscape, and by the 1st century BC, vast grape and olive estates had supplanted the yeoman farmers, who were unable to match the imported grain price. The annexation of Egypt, Sicily and Tunisia in North Africa provided a continuous supply of grains. In turn, olive oil and wine were Italy's main exports. Two-tier crop rotation was practised, but farm productivity was low.

Industrial and manufacturing activities were small. The largest such activities were the mining and quarrying of stones, which provided basic construction materials for the buildings of that period. In manufacturing, production was on a relatively small scale, and generally consisted of workshops and small factories that employed at most dozens of workers. However, some brick factories employed hundreds of workers.

The economy of the early Republic was largely based on smallholding and paid labour. However, foreign wars and conquests made slaves increasingly cheap and plentiful, and by the late Republic, the economy was largely dependent on slave labour for both skilled and unskilled work. Slaves are estimated to have constituted around 20% of the Roman Empire's population at this time and 40% in the city of Rome. Only in the Roman Empire, when the conquests stopped and the prices of slaves increased, did hired labour become more economical than slave ownership.

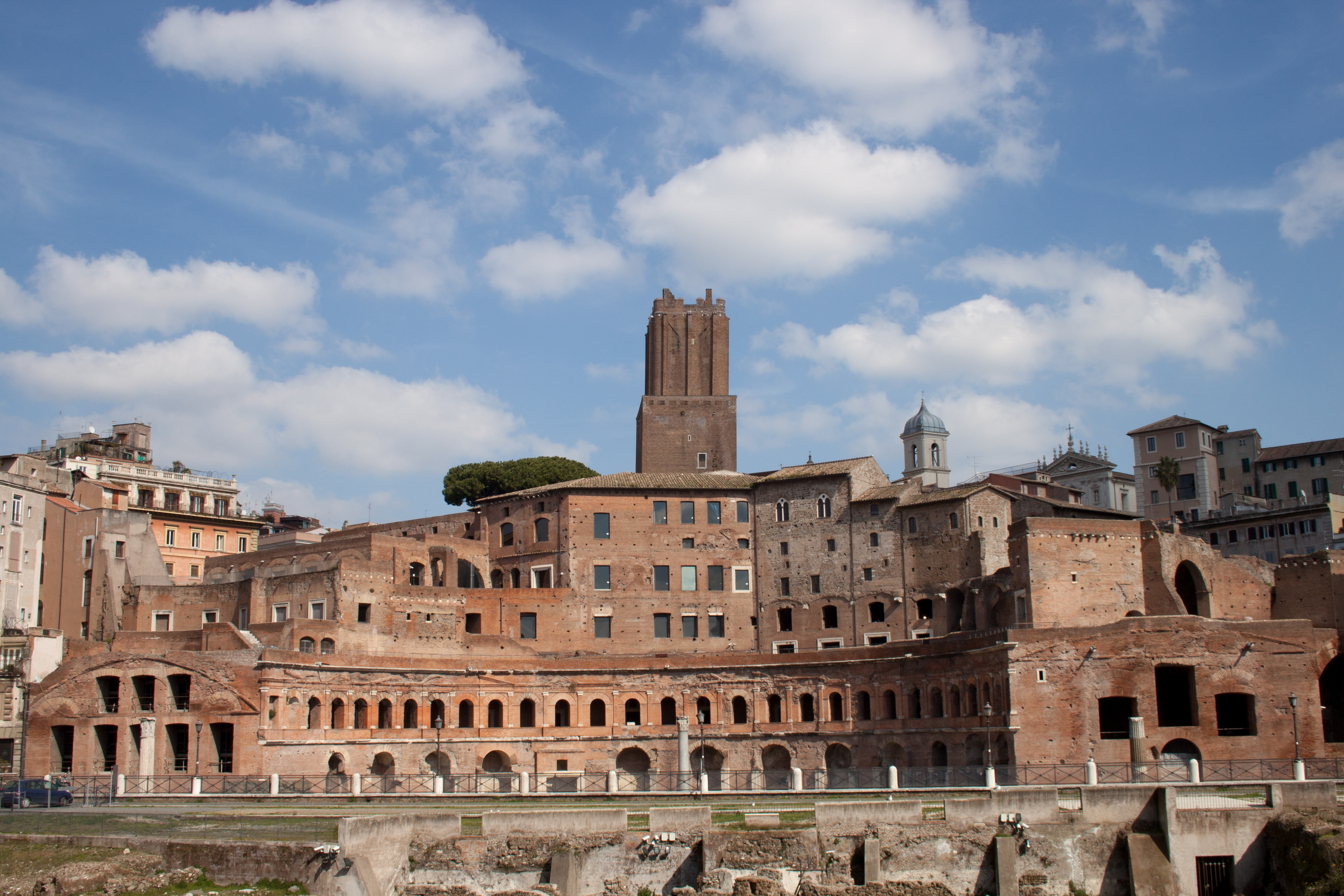
View of Trajan's Market, built by Apollodorus of Damascus

Although barter was used in ancient Rome, and often used in tax collection, Rome had a very developed coinage system, with brass, bronze, and precious metal coins in circulation throughout the Empire and beyond—some have even been discovered in India. Before the 3rd century BC, copper was traded by weight, measured in unmarked lumps, across central Italy. The original copper coins (as) had a face value of one Roman pound of copper, but weighed less. Thus, Roman money's utility as a unit of exchange consistently exceeded its intrinsic value as metal. After Nero began debasing the silver denarius, its legal value was an estimated one-third greater than its intrinsic value.

Horses were expensive and other pack animals were slower. Mass trade on the Roman roads connected military posts, where Roman markets were centered. These roads were designed for wheels. As a result, there was transport of commodities between Roman regions, but increased with the rise of Roman maritime trade in the 2nd century BC. During that period, a trading vessel took less than a month to complete a trip from Gades to Alexandria via Ostia, spanning the entire length of the Mediterranean. Transport by sea was around 60 times cheaper than by land, so the volume for such trips was much larger.

Some economists consider the Roman Empire a market economy, similar in its degree of capitalistic practices to the 17th-century Netherlands and 18th-century England.

=== Family ===
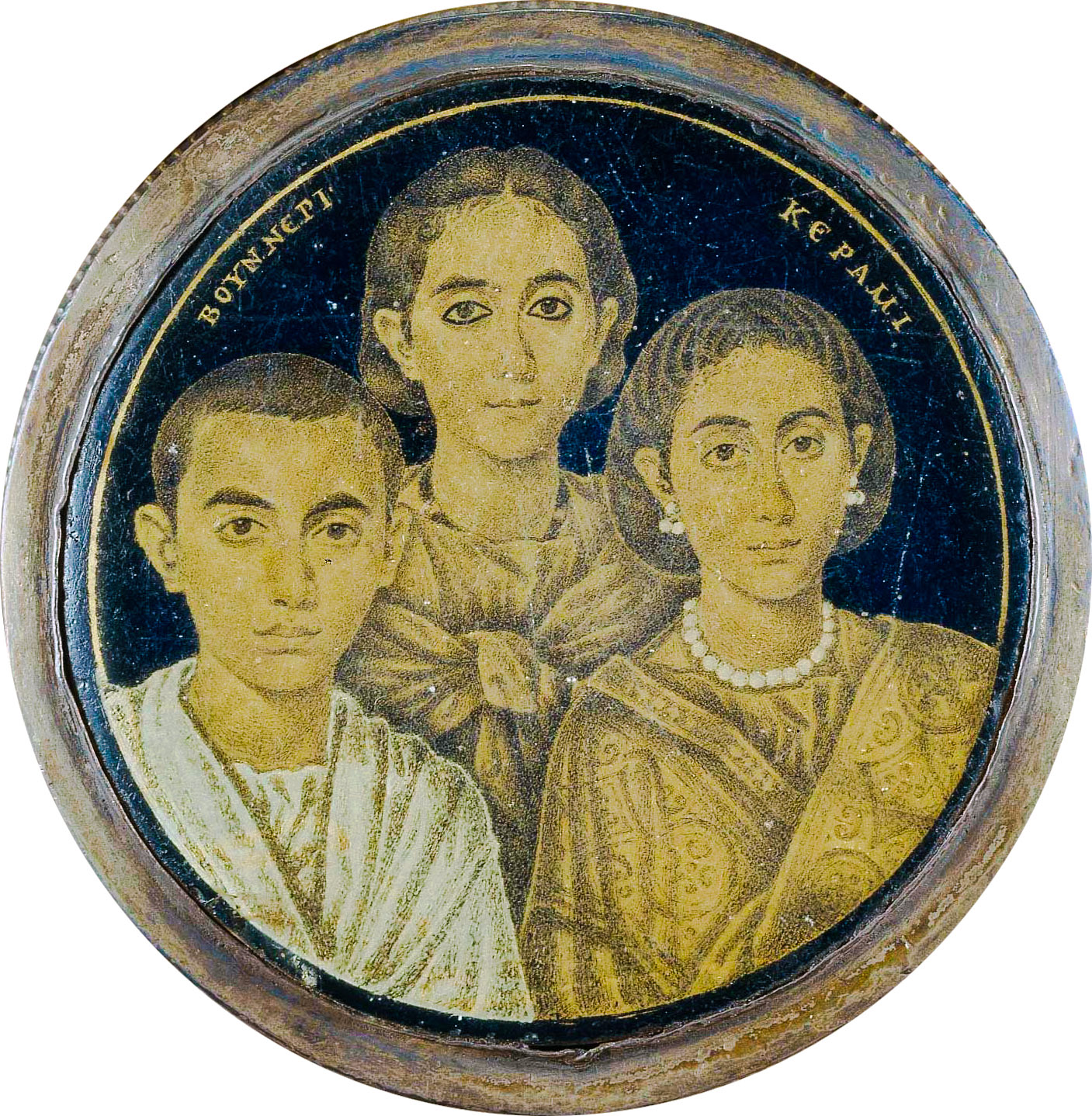
A gold glass portrait of a family from Roman Egypt. The Greek inscription on the medallion may indicate either the name of the artist or the pater familias who is absent in the portrait. (Note: The Brescia Medallion, a gold glass portrait, was most likely crafted by Alexandrian Greek artisans, due to the Egyptian dialect of the inscription, in the 3rd century, although others propend for craftmen with Alexandrian influence working in Italy; "since there is no doubt that all kind of Greek might have been written in the [Roman] metropolis, the main sequences suggest a Roman origin".)

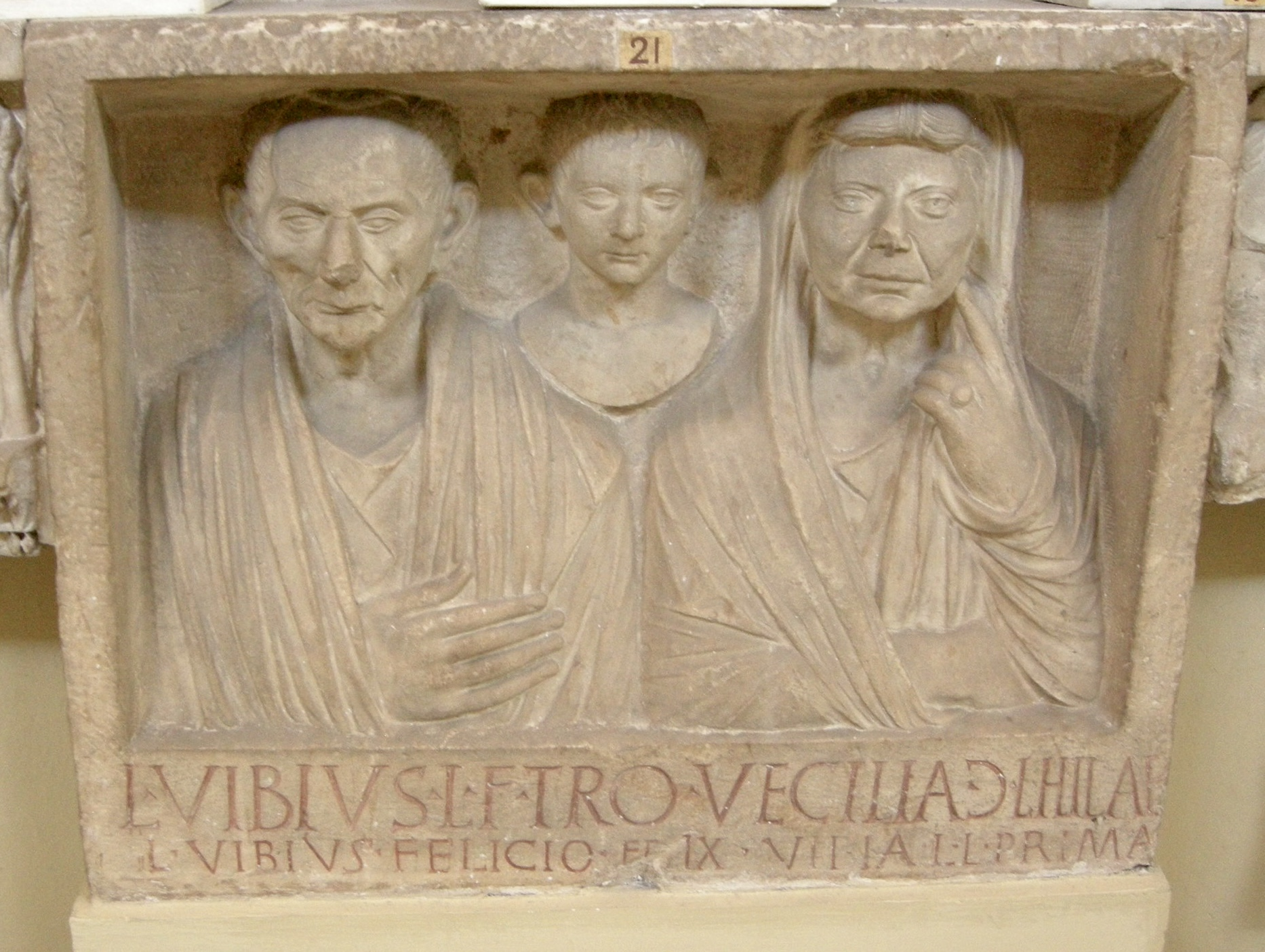
A funerary relief with members of the gens Vibia, late 1st century BC, Vatican Museums

The basic units of Roman society were households and families. Groups of households connected through the male line formed a family (gens), based on blood ties, a common ancestry or adoption. During the Republic, some powerful families, or Gentes Maiores, came to dominate political life. Families were headed by their oldest male citizen, the pater familias (father of the family), who held lawful authority (patria potestas, 'father's power') over wives, sons, daughters, and slaves of the household, and the family's wealth.

The extreme expressions of this power—the selling or killing of family members for moral or civil offences, including simple disobedience—were very rarely exercised, and were forbidden in the Imperial era. A pater familias had moral and legal duties towards all family members. Even the most despotic pater familias was expected to consult senior members of his household and gens over matters that affected the family's well-being and reputation. Traditionally, such matters were regarded as outside the purview of the state and its magistrates; under the emperors, they were increasingly subject to state interference and legislation.

Once accepted into their birth family by their fathers, children were potential heirs. They could not be lawfully given away, or sold into slavery. If parents were unable to care for their child, or if its paternity was in doubt, they could resort to infant exposure (Boswell translates this as being "offered" up to care by the gods or strangers). If a deformed or sickly newborn was patently "unfit to live", killing it was a duty of the pater familias. A citizen father who exposed a healthy freeborn child was not punished, but automatically lost his potestas over that child. Abandoned children were sometimes adopted; some would have been sold into slavery. Slavery was near-ubiquitous and almost universally accepted. In the early Republic, citizens in debt were allowed to sell their labour, and perhaps their sons, to their debtor in a limited form of slavery called nexum but this was abolished in the middle Republic. Freedom was considered a natural and proper state for citizens; slaves could be lawfully freed, with consent and support of their owners, and still serve their owners' family and financial interests, as freedmen or freed women. This was the basis of the client-patron relationship, one of the most important features of Rome's economy and society.

In law, a pater familias held potestas over his adult sons with their own households. This could give rise to legal anomalies, such as adult sons also having the status of minors. No man could be considered a pater familias, nor could he truly hold property under law, while his own father lived. During Rome's early history, married daughters came under the control (manus) of their husbands' pater familias. By the late Republic, most married women retained lawful connection to their birth family, though any children from the marriage belonged to her husband's family. The mother or an elderly relative often raised both boys and girls. Roman moralists held that marriage and child-raising fulfilled a basic duty to family, gens, and the state. Multiple remarriages were not uncommon. Fathers usually began seeking husbands for their daughters when these reached an age between twelve and fourteen, but most commoner-class women stayed single until their twenties, and in general seem to have been far more independent than wives of the elite. Divorce required the consent of one party, along with the return of any dowry. Both parents had power over their children during their minority and adulthood, but husbands had much less control over their wives.

Roman citizen women held a restricted form of citizenship; they could not vote but were protected by law. They ran families, could own and run businesses, own and cultivate land, write their own wills, and plead in court on their own behalf, or on behalf of others, all under dispensation of the courts and the nominal supervision of a senior male relative. Throughout the late Republican and Imperial eras, a declining birthrate among the elite, and a corresponding increase among commoners was cause of concern for many gentes; Augustus tried to address this through state intervention, offering rewards to any woman who gave birth to three or more children, and penalising the childless. The latter was much resented, and the former had seemingly negligible results. Aristocratic women seem to have been increasingly disinclined to childbearing.

=== Time and dates ===
Roman hours were counted ordinally from dawn to dawn. Thus, if sunrise was at 6 am, then 6 to 7 am was called the 'first hour'. Midday was called meridies, and it is from this word that the terms am (ante meridiem) and pm (post meridiem) stem. The English word "noon" comes from nona ('ninth (hour)'), which referred to 3 pm in ancient Rome. (Note: Later in Christian liturgy, "noon" came to describe the nones, a time of prayer originally at 3 pm but later at midday, so "noon" became synonymous with midday.) The Romans had clocks (horologia), which included giant public sundials (solaria) and water clocks (clepsydrae).

The ancient Roman week originally had eight days, which were identified by letters A to H, with the eighth day being the nundinum, or market day, a kind of weekend when farmers sold their produce on the streets. The seven-day week, introduced from the East during the early Empire, was officially adopted during the reign of Constantine. Romans named week days after celestial bodies from at least the 1st century AD.

The Roman year originally had ten months from Martius (March) to December, with the winter period not included in the calendar. The first four months were named after gods (Martius, Aprilis, Maius, Junius) and the others were numbered (Quintilis, Sextilis, September, October, November, and December). Numa Pompilius, the second king of Rome (716–673 BC), is said to have introduced the months of January and February, both also named after gods, beginning the 12-month calendar still in use today. In 44 BC, the month Quintilis was renamed to Julius (July) after Julius Caesar and in 8 BC, Sextilis was renamed to Augustus (August) after Augustus.

The Romans had several ways of tracking years. One widespread way was the consular dating, which identified years by the two consuls who ruled each year. Another way, introduced in the late 3rd century AD, was counting years from the indictio, a 15-year period based on the announcement of the delivery of food and other goods to the government. Another way, less popular but more similar to present day, was ab urbe condita, which counted years from the mythical foundation of Rome in 753 BC.

== Culture ==
The seven hills of Rome

Life in ancient Rome revolved around the city of Rome, located on seven hills. The city had a vast number of monumental structures like the Colosseum, the Trajan's Forum and the Pantheon. It had theatres, gymnasiums, marketplaces, functional sewers, bath complexes complete with libraries and shops, and fountains with fresh drinking water supplied by hundreds of miles of aqueducts. Throughout the territory under the control of ancient Rome, residential architecture ranged from modest houses to country villas.

In Rome, there were imperial residences on Palatine Hill. The low plebeian and middle equestrian classes lived in the city centre, packed into apartments, or insulae, which were almost like modern ghettos. These areas, often built by upper class property owners to rent, were often centred upon collegia or taberna. These people, provided with a free supply of grain, and entertained by gladiatorial games, were enrolled as clients of patrons among the upper class patricians, whose assistance they sought and whose interests they upheld.

=== Language ===
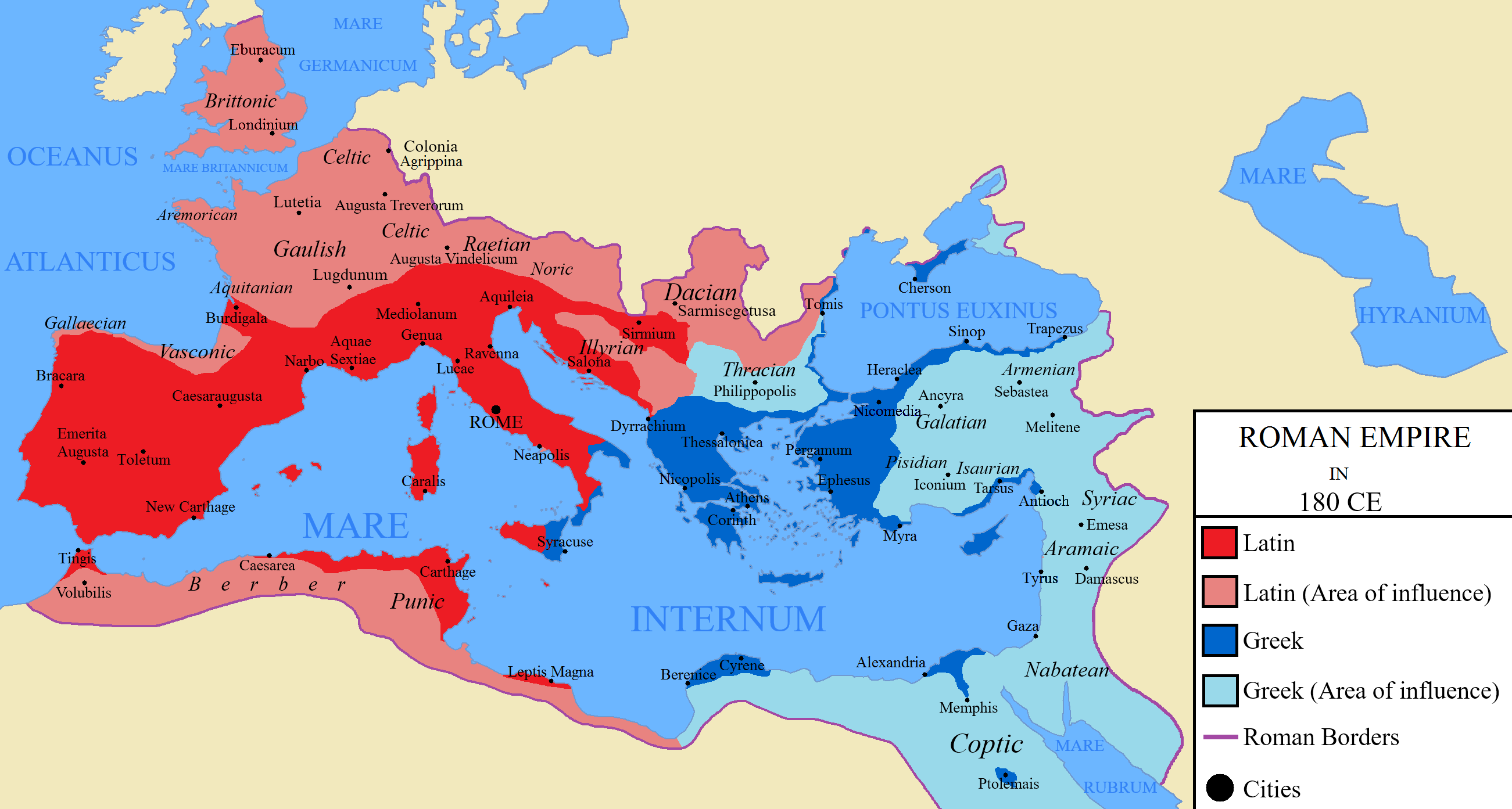
The Roman Empire in 180 AD. Latin had a great influence in the western part of the empire, both as a native language and as an administrative language. In the eastern part, the Greek language was predominant.

The native language of the Romans was Latin, an Italic language the grammar of which relies little on word order, conveying meaning through a system of affixes attached to word stems. Its alphabet was based on the Etruscan alphabet, which was in turn based on the Greek alphabet. Although surviving Latin literature consists almost entirely of Classical Latin, an artificial and highly stylised and polished literary language from the 1st century BC, the spoken language of the Roman Empire was Vulgar Latin, which significantly differed from Classical Latin in grammar and vocabulary, and eventually in pronunciation. Speakers of Latin could understand both until the 7th century when spoken Latin began to diverge so much that 'Classical' or 'Good Latin' had to be learned as a second language.

While Latin remained the main written language of the Roman Empire, Greek came to be the language spoken by the well-educated elite, as most of the literature studied by Romans was written in Greek. Most of the emperors were bilingual but had a preference for Latin in the public sphere for political reasons, a practice that first started during the Punic wars. In the eastern part of the Roman Empire (and later the Eastern Roman Empire), Latin was never able to replace Greek, a legacy of the Hellenistic period. Justinian would be the last emperor to use Latin in government and marks when Greek officially took over. The expansion of the Roman Empire spread Latin throughout Europe, and Vulgar Latin evolved into many distinct Romance languages.

=== Religion ===
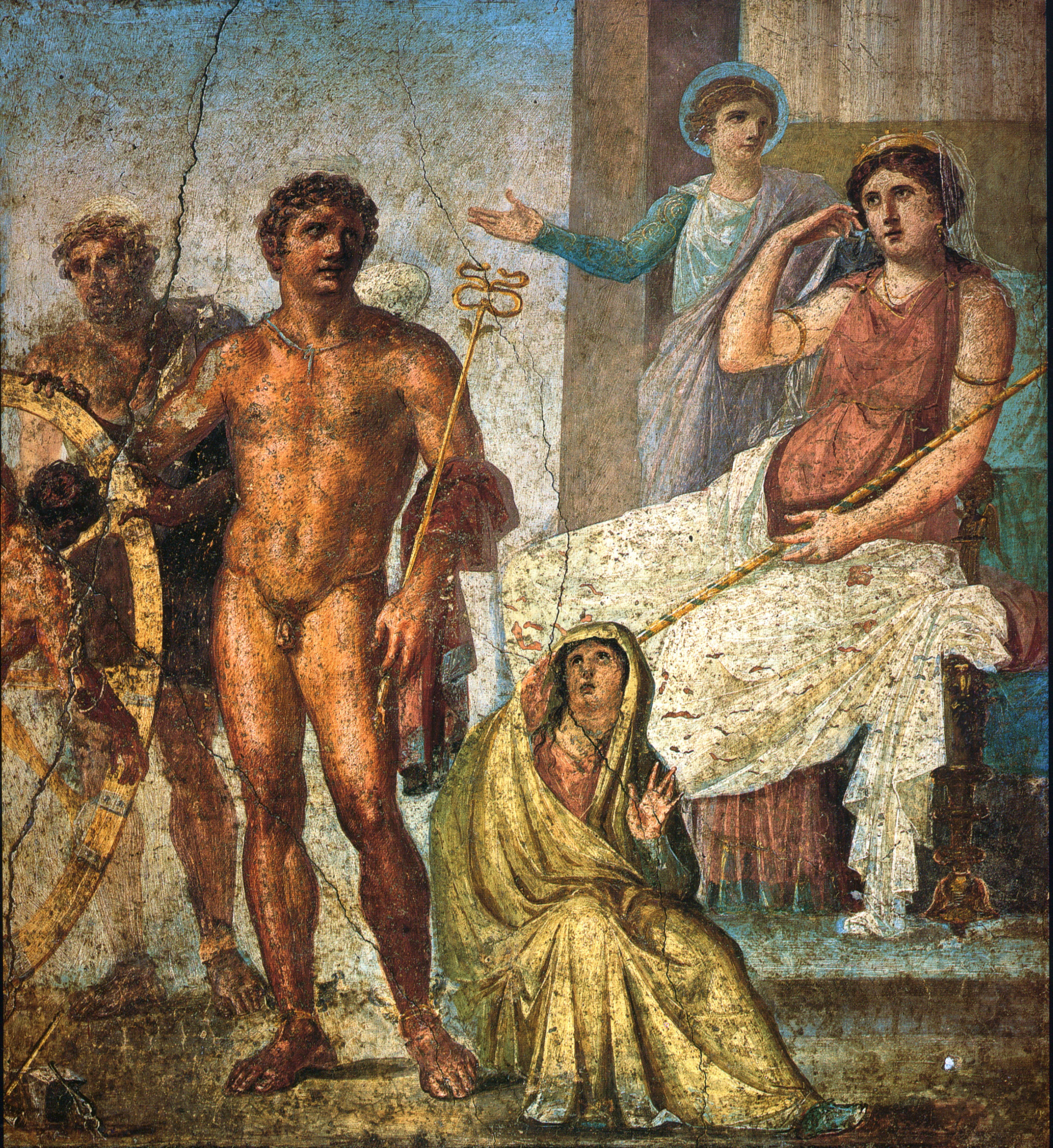
Punishment of Ixion: in the centre is Mercury holding the caduceus and on the right Juno sits on her throne. Behind her Iris stands and gestures. On the left is Vulcan (blond figure) standing behind the wheel, manning it, with Ixion already tied to it. Nephele sits at Mercury's feet; a Roman fresco from the eastern wall of the triclinium in the House of the Vettii, Pompeii, Fourth Style (60–79 AD).

Archaic Roman religion, at least concerning the gods, was made up not of written narratives, but rather of complex interrelations between gods and humans. Unlike in Greek mythology, the gods were not personified, but were vaguely defined sacred spirits called numina. Romans also believed that every person, place or thing had its own genius, or divine soul. During the Roman Republic, Roman religion was organised under a strict system of priestly offices, which were held by men of senatorial rank. The College of Pontifices was uppermost body in this hierarchy, and its chief priest, the Pontifex Maximus, was the head of the state religion. Flamens took care of the cults of various gods, while augurs were trusted with taking the auspices. The sacred king took on the religious responsibilities of the deposed kings. In the Roman Empire, deceased emperors who had ruled well were deified by their successors and the Senate. and the formalised imperial cult became increasingly prominent.

As contact with the Greeks increased, the old Roman gods became increasingly associated with Greek gods. Under the Empire, the Romans absorbed the mythologies of their conquered subjects, often leading to situations in which the temples and priests of traditional Italian deities existed side by side with those of foreign gods.

Beginning with Emperor Nero in the 1st century AD, Roman official policy towards Christianity was negative, and at some point, being a Christian could be punishable by death. Under Emperor Diocletian, the persecution of Christians reached its peak. However, it became an officially supported religion in the Roman state under Diocletian's successor, Constantine I, with the signing of the Edict of Milan in 313, and quickly became dominant. All religions except Christianity were prohibited in 391 AD by an edict of Emperor Theodosius I.

=== Ethics and morality ===
Like many ancient cultures, concepts of ethics and morality, while sharing some commonalities with modern society, differed greatly in several important ways. Because ancient civilisations like Rome were under constant threat of attack from marauding tribes, their culture was necessarily militaristic with martial skills being a prized attribute. Whereas modern societies consider compassion a virtue, Roman society considered it a vice, a moral defect. One of the primary purposes of the gladiatorial games was to inoculate Roman citizens from this weakness. (Note: "... where compassion was regarded as a moral defect ...".^ "Gladatorial games were popular because the Romans actually believed that compassion was a vice and a weakness.") Romans instead prized virtues such as courage and conviction (virtus), a sense of duty to one's people, moderation and avoiding excess (moderatio), forgiveness and understanding (clementia), fairness (severitas), and loyalty (pietas).

Roman society had well-established and restrictive norms related to sexuality, though as with many societies, the lion's share of the responsibilities fell on women. Women were generally expected to be monogamous having only a single husband during their life (univira), though this was much less regarded by the elite, especially under the empire. Women were expected to be modest in public avoiding any provocative appearance and to demonstrate absolute fidelity to their husbands (pudicitia). Wearing a veil was a common expectation to preserve modesty. Sex outside of marriage was generally frowned upon for men and women and was made illegal during the imperial period. Nevertheless, prostitution was an accepted and regulated practice.

Public demonstrations of death, violence, and brutality were used as a source of entertainment in Roman communities; however it was also a way to maintain social order, demonstrate power, and signify communal unity.

=== Art, music and literature ===
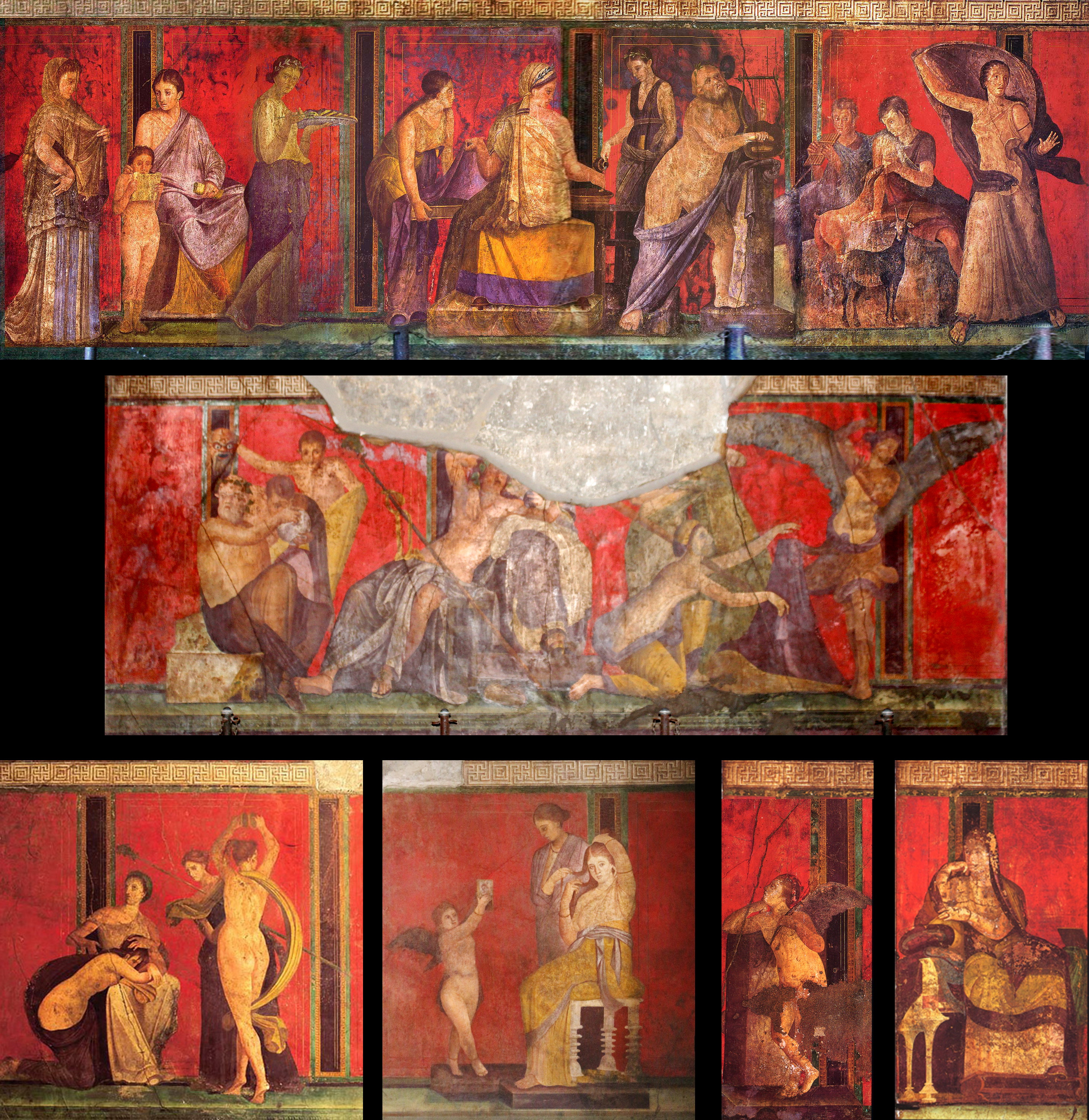
Frescoes from the Villa of the Mysteries in Pompeii, Italy, Roman artwork dated to the mid-1st century BC

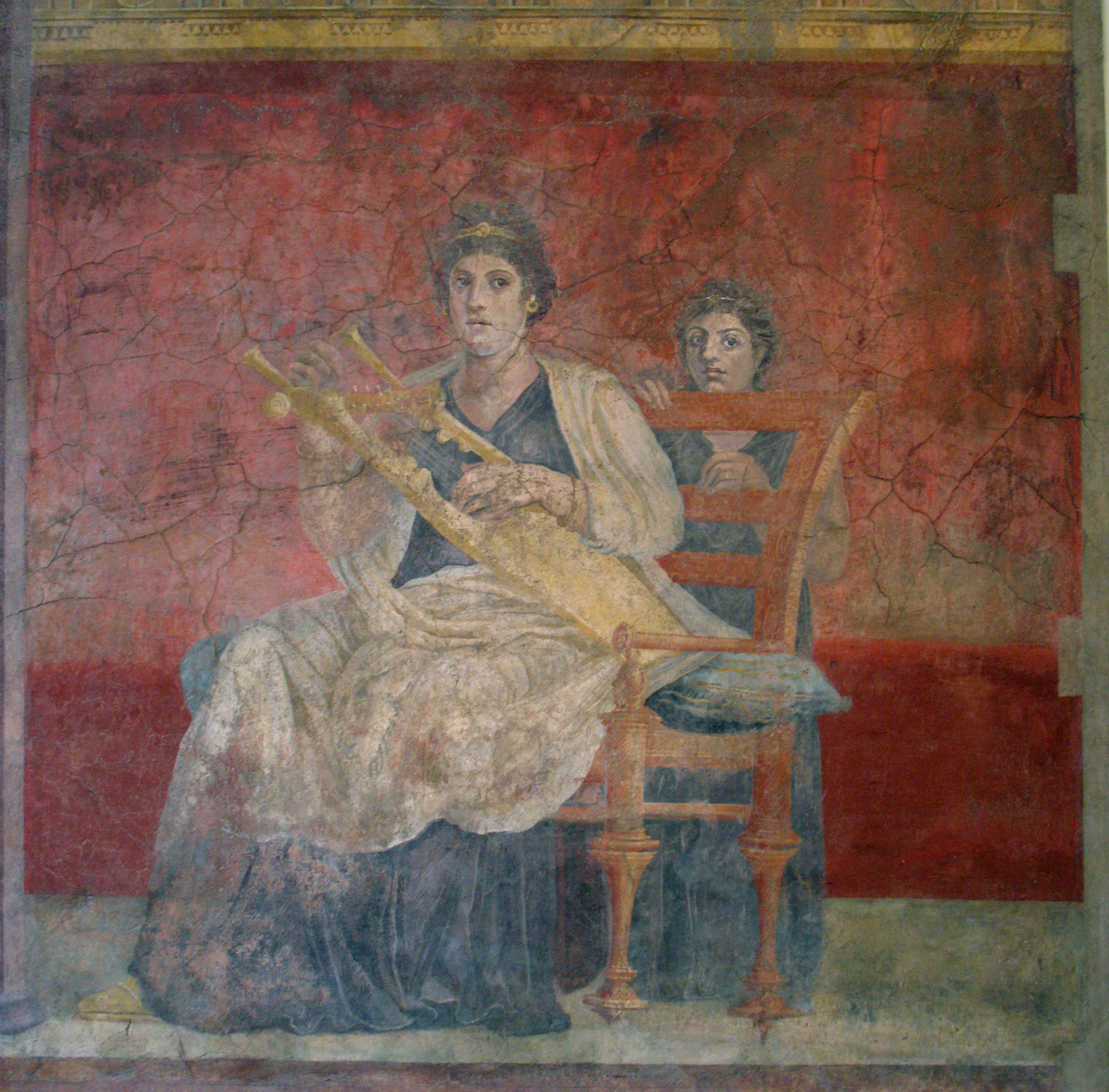
Woman playing a kithara, from the Villa Boscoreale, Italy, circa 40–30 BC

Roman painting styles show Greek influences, and surviving examples are primarily frescoes used to adorn the walls and ceilings of country villas, though Roman literature includes mentions of paintings on wood, ivory, and other materials. Several examples of Roman painting have been found at Pompeii, and from these art historians divide the history of Roman painting into four periods.

The first style of Roman painting was practised from the early 2nd century BC to the early- or mid-1st century BC. It was mainly composed of imitations of marble and masonry, though sometimes including depictions of mythological characters. The second style began during the early 1st century BC and attempted to depict realistically three-dimensional architectural features and landscapes. The third style occurred during the reign of Augustus (27 BC – 14 AD), and rejected the realism of the second style in favour of simple ornamentation. A small architectural scene, landscape, or abstract design was placed in the centre with a monochrome background. The fourth style, which began in the 1st century AD, depicted scenes from mythology, while retaining architectural details and abstract patterns.

Portrait sculpture used youthful and classical proportions, evolving later into a mixture of realism and idealism. During the Antonine and Severan periods, ornate hair and bearding, with deep cutting and drilling, became popular. Advancements were also made in relief sculptures, usually depicting Roman victories.

Roman music was largely based on Greek music, and played an important part in many aspects of Roman life. In the Roman military, musical instruments such as the tuba (a long trumpet) or the cornu were used to give various commands, while the buccina (possibly a trumpet or horn) and the lituus (probably an elongated J-shaped instrument), were used in ceremonial capacities. Music was used in the Roman amphitheatres between fights and in the odea, and in these settings is known to have featured the cornu and the hydraulis (a type of water organ). Most religious rituals featured musical performances. Some music historians believe that music was used at almost all public ceremonies.

The graffiti, brothels, paintings, and sculptures found in Pompeii and Herculaneum suggest that the Romans had a sex-saturated culture.

==== Literature and libraries ====
Latin literature was, from its start, influenced heavily by Greek authors. Some of the earliest extant works are of historical epics telling the early military history of Rome. As the Republic expanded, authors began to produce poetry, comedy, history, and tragedy.

Ancient Rome's literary contributions are still recognised today and the works by ancient Roman authors were available in bookshops as well as in public and private libraries. Many scholars and statesmen of ancient Rome cultivated private libraries that were used both as demonstrations of knowledge and displays of wealth and power.

Although Julius Caesar had intended to establish public libraries to further establish Rome as a great cultural centre like Athens and Alexandria, he died before this was accomplished. Caesar's former lieutenant, Gaius Asinius Pollio, took up the project and opened the first public library in Rome in the Atrium Libertatis. Emperors Augustus, Tiberius, Vespasian, Domitian, and Trajan also founded or expanded public libraries in Rome during their reigns. These included the Ulpian Library in Trajan's Forum and libraries in the Temple of Apollo Palatinus, the Temple of Peace in the Roman Forum, the Temple of Divus Augustus, which was dedicated to Minerva when it was rebuilt under Emperor Domitian's orders. By the fall of the Western Roman Empire, the city of Rome had more than two dozen public libraries. As the Roman Empire spread, public libraries were established in other major cities and cultural centres including Ephesos, Athens, and Timgad.

=== Cuisine ===
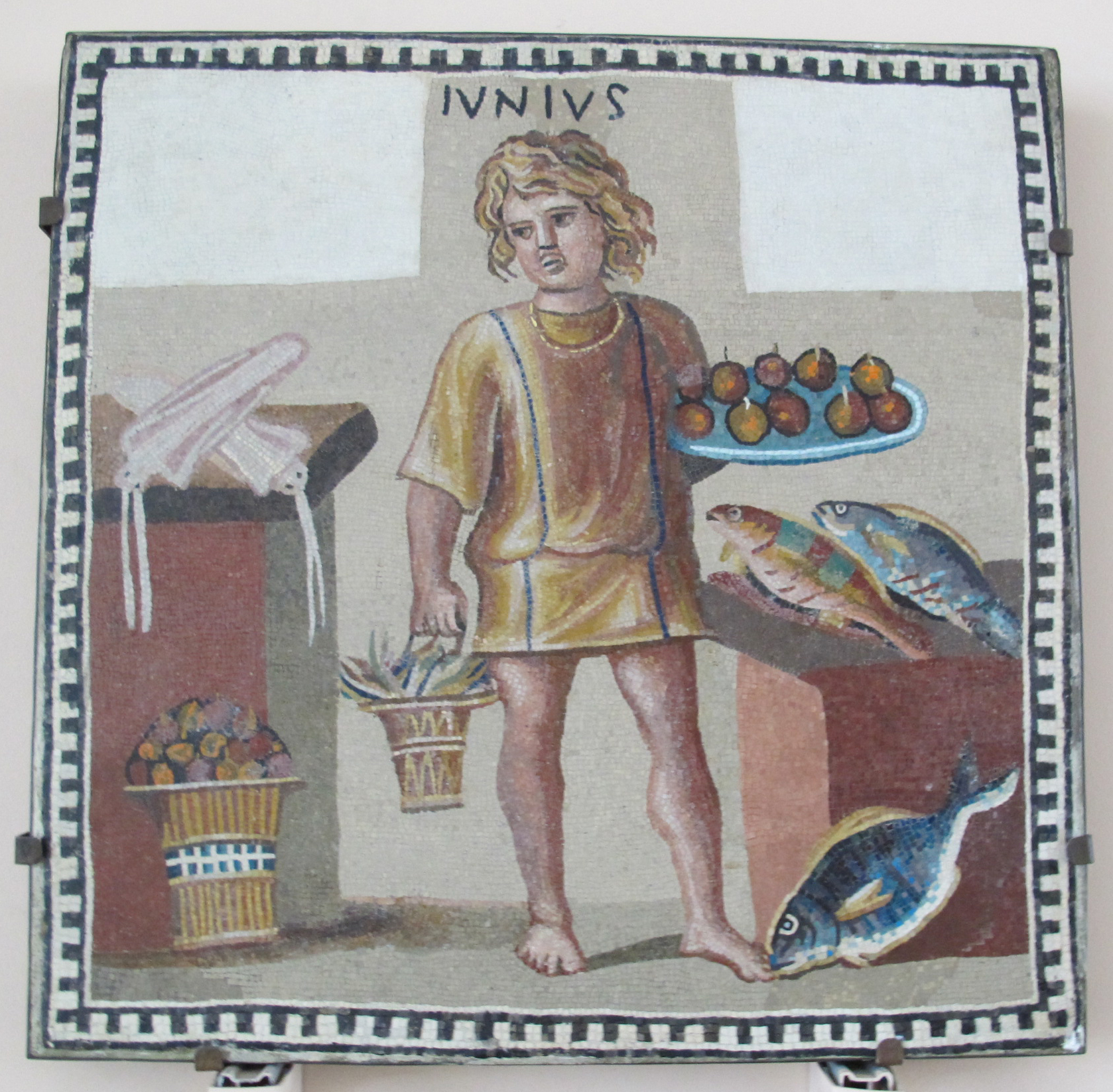
A boy with a platter of fruits and what may be a bucket of crabs, in a kitchen with fish and squid, on the June panel from a 3rd-century mosaic depicting the months, in the Hermitage Museum, Antiquity Collection, room 101 in St Petersburg, Russia

Ancient Roman cuisine changed over the long duration of this ancient civilisation. Dietary habits were affected by the influence of Greek culture, the political changes from Kingdom to Republic to Empire, and the Empire's enormous expansion, which exposed Romans to many new, provincial culinary habits and cooking techniques. In the beginning the differences between social classes were relatively small, but disparities evolved with the Empire's growth. Men and women drank wine with their meals.

The ancient Roman diet included many items that are staples of modern Italian cooking. Pliny the Elder discussed more than 30 varieties of olive, 40 kinds of pear, figs (native and imported from Africa and the eastern provinces), and a wide variety of vegetables, including carrots (of different colours, but not orange) as well as celery, garlic, some flower bulbs, cabbage and other brassicas (such as kale and broccoli), lettuce, endive, onion, leek, asparagus, radishes, turnips, parsnips, beets, green peas, chard, cardoons, olives, and cucumber.

However, some foods now considered characteristic of modern Italian cuisine were not used. In particular, spinach and eggplant (aubergine) were introduced later from the Arab world, and tomatoes, potatoes, capsicum peppers, and maize (the modern source of polenta) only appeared in Europe following the discovery of the New World and the Columbian Exchange. The Romans knew of rice, but it was very rarely available to them. There were also few citrus fruits.

Butcher's meat such as beef was an uncommon luxury. The most popular meat was pork, especially sausages. Fish was more common than meat, with a sophisticated aquaculture and large-scale industries devoted to oyster farming. The Romans also engaged in snail farming and oak grub farming. Some fish were greatly esteemed and fetched high prices, such as mullet raised in the fishery at Cosa, and "elaborate means were invented to assure its freshness".

Traditionally, a breakfast called ientaculum was served at dawn. At mid-day to early afternoon, Romans ate cena, the main meal of the day, and at nightfall a light supper called vesperna. With the increased importation of foreign foods, the cena grew larger in size and included a wider range of foods. Thus, it gradually shifted to the evening, while the vesperna was abandoned completely over the course of the years. The mid-day meal prandium became a light meal to hold one over until cena.

=== Fashion ===
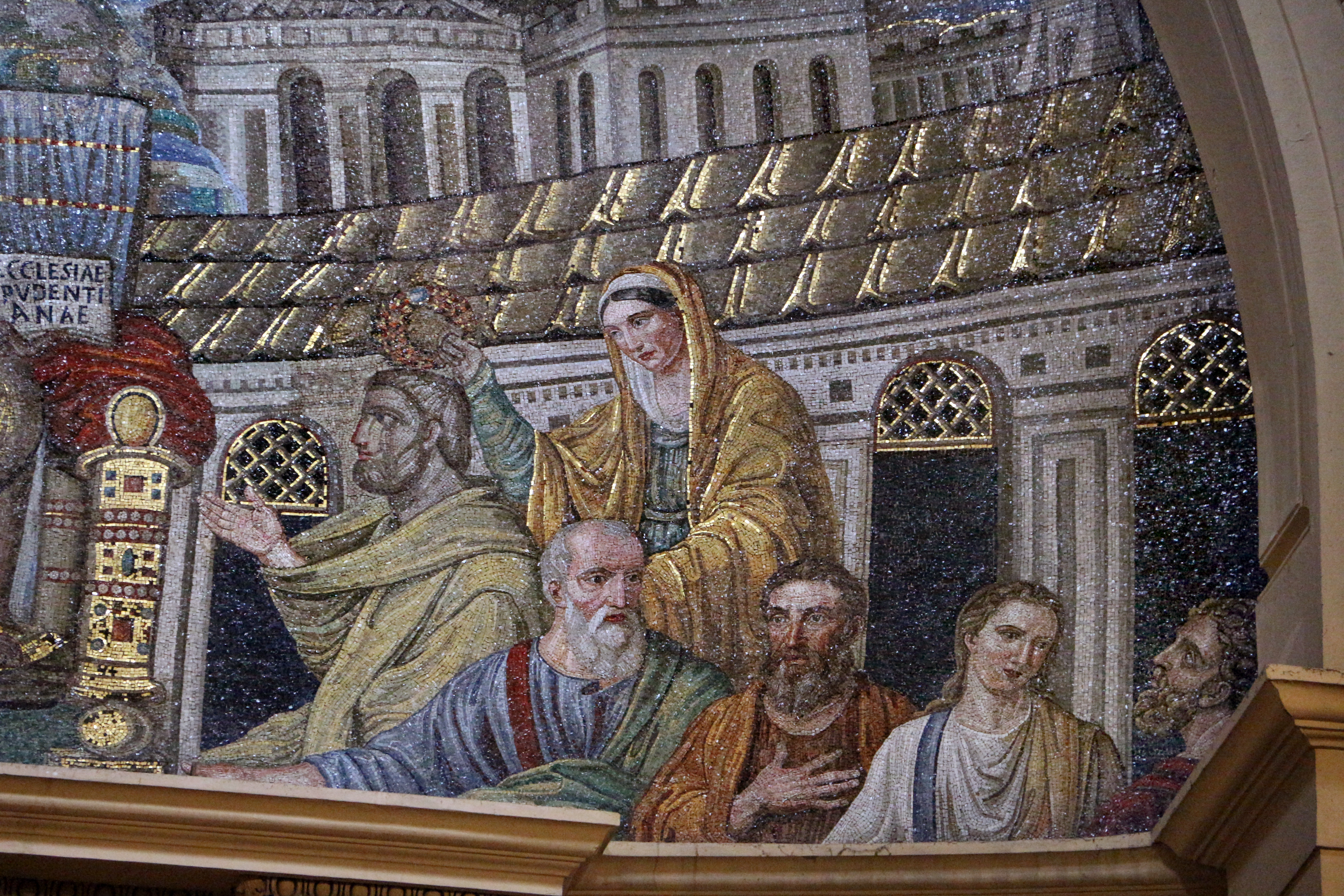
Detail of a Paleochristian Roman mosaic from the basilica of Santa Pudenziana in Rome, c. 410 AD, depicting Saint Pudentiana

The toga, a common garment during the era of Julius Caesar, was gradually abandoned by all social classes of the Empire. At the early 4th century, the toga had become just a garment worn by senators in Senate and ceremonial events. At the 4th century, the toga was replaced by the paenula (a garment similar to a poncho) as the everyday garment of the Romans, from the lower classes to the upper classes. Another garment that was popular among the Romans in the later years of the Western Roman Empire was the pallium, which was mostly worn by philosophers and scholars in general. Due to external influences, mainly from the Germanic peoples, the Romans adopted tunics very similar to those used by the Germanic peoples with whom they interacted in the final years of the Western Empire, also adopted trousers and hats like the pileus pannonicus. During the Late Empire, the paludamentum (a type of military clothing) was used only by the Emperor of Rome (since the reign of Augustus, the first emperor) while the dalmatic (also used by the Christian clergy) began to spread throughout the empire.

=== Games and recreation ===
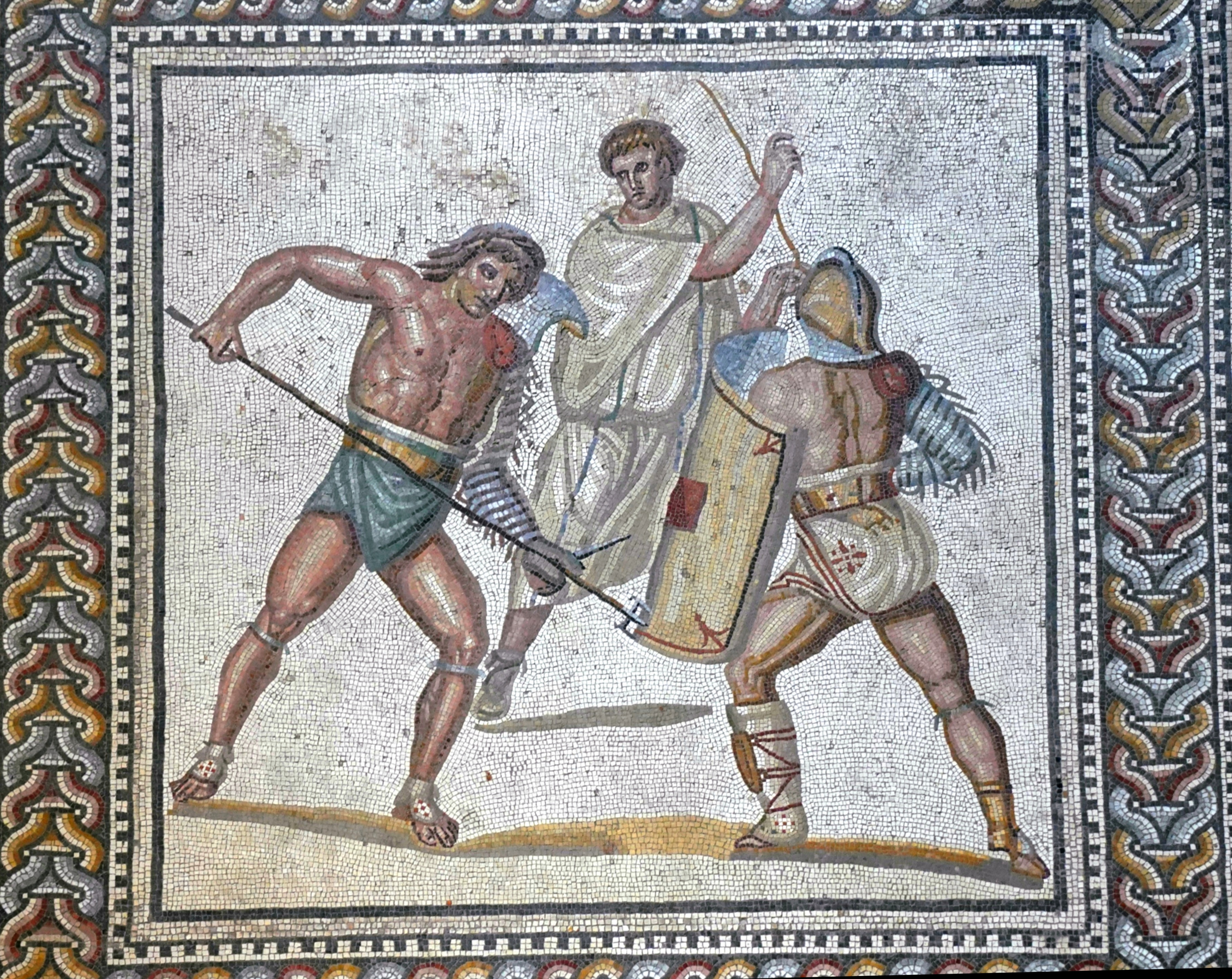
Gladiator combat was strictly a spectator sport. This mosaic shows combatants and referee, from the villa at Nennig, Germany, c. 2nd–3rd century AD.

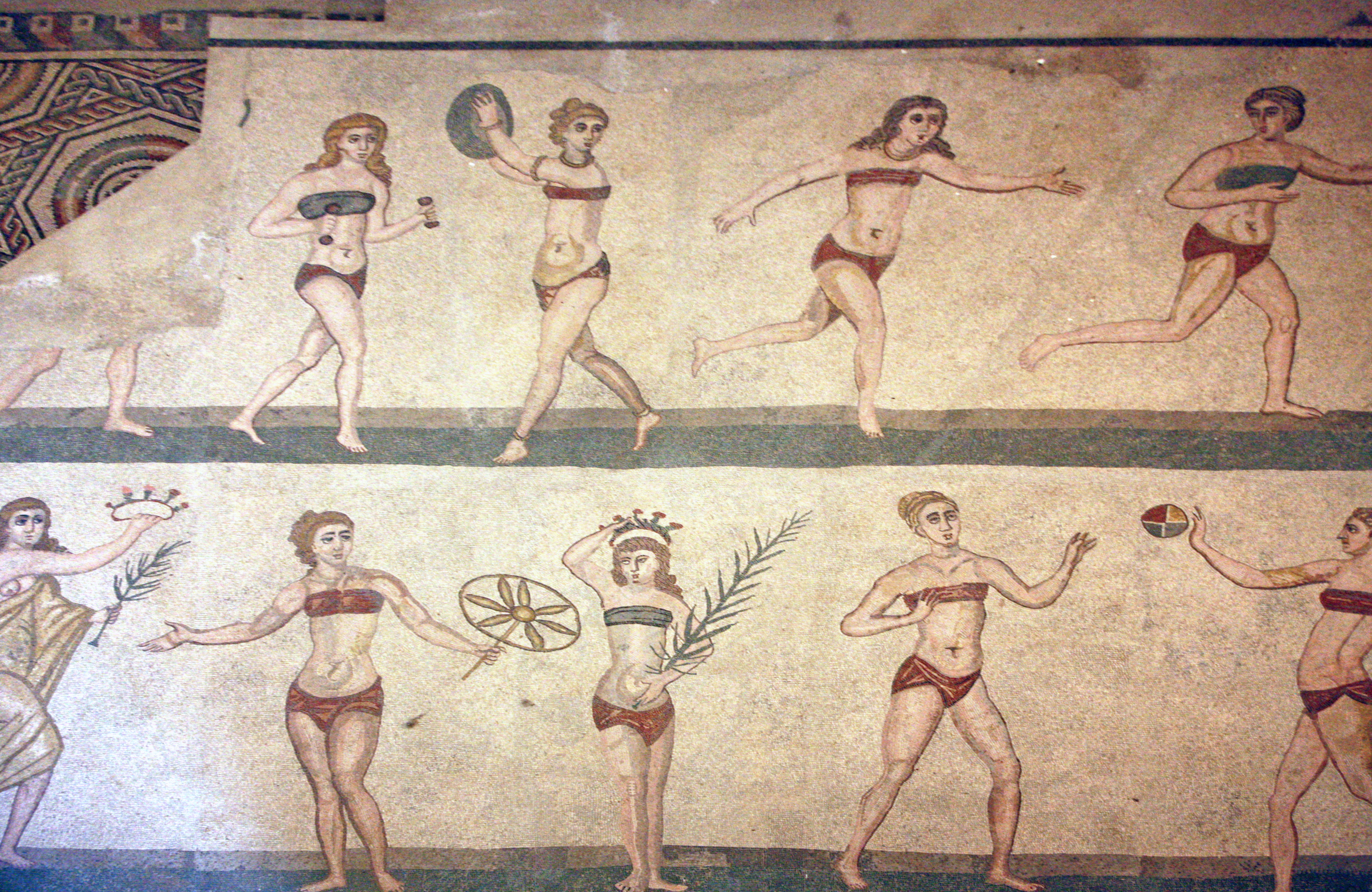
The "bikini girls" mosaic, showing women playing sports, from the Villa Romana del Casale, Italy, Roman province of Sicilia, 4th century AD

The youth of Rome had several forms of athletic play and exercise. Play for boys was supposed to prepare them for active military service, such as jumping, wrestling, boxing, and racing. In the countryside, pastimes for the wealthy also included fishing and hunting. The Romans also had several forms of ball playing, including one resembling handball. Dice games, board games, and gamble games were popular pastimes. For the wealthy, dinner parties presented an opportunity for entertainment, sometimes featuring music, dancing, and poetry readings. The majority, less well-off, sometimes enjoyed similar parties through clubs or associations, but for most Romans, recreational dining usually meant patronising taverns. Children entertained themselves with toys and such games as leapfrog.

Public games and spectacles were sponsored by leading Romans who wished to advertise their generosity and court popular approval; in Rome or its provinces, this usually meant the emperor or his governors. Venues in Rome and the provinces were developed specifically for public games. Rome's Colosseum was built in 70 AD under the Roman emperor Vespasian and opened in 80 AD to host other events and gladiatorial combats. Gladiators sometimes fought to the death, but more often to an adjudicated victory, usually in keeping with the mood of the watching crowd. Shows of exotic animals were popular in their own right; but sometimes animals were pitted against human beings, either armed professionals or unarmed criminals who had been condemned to public death.

Chariot racing was extremely popular among all classes. In Rome, these races were usually held at the Circus Maximus, which had been purpose-built for chariot and horse-racing and, as Rome's largest public place, was also used for festivals and animal shows. It could seat around 150,000 people.

== Technology ==
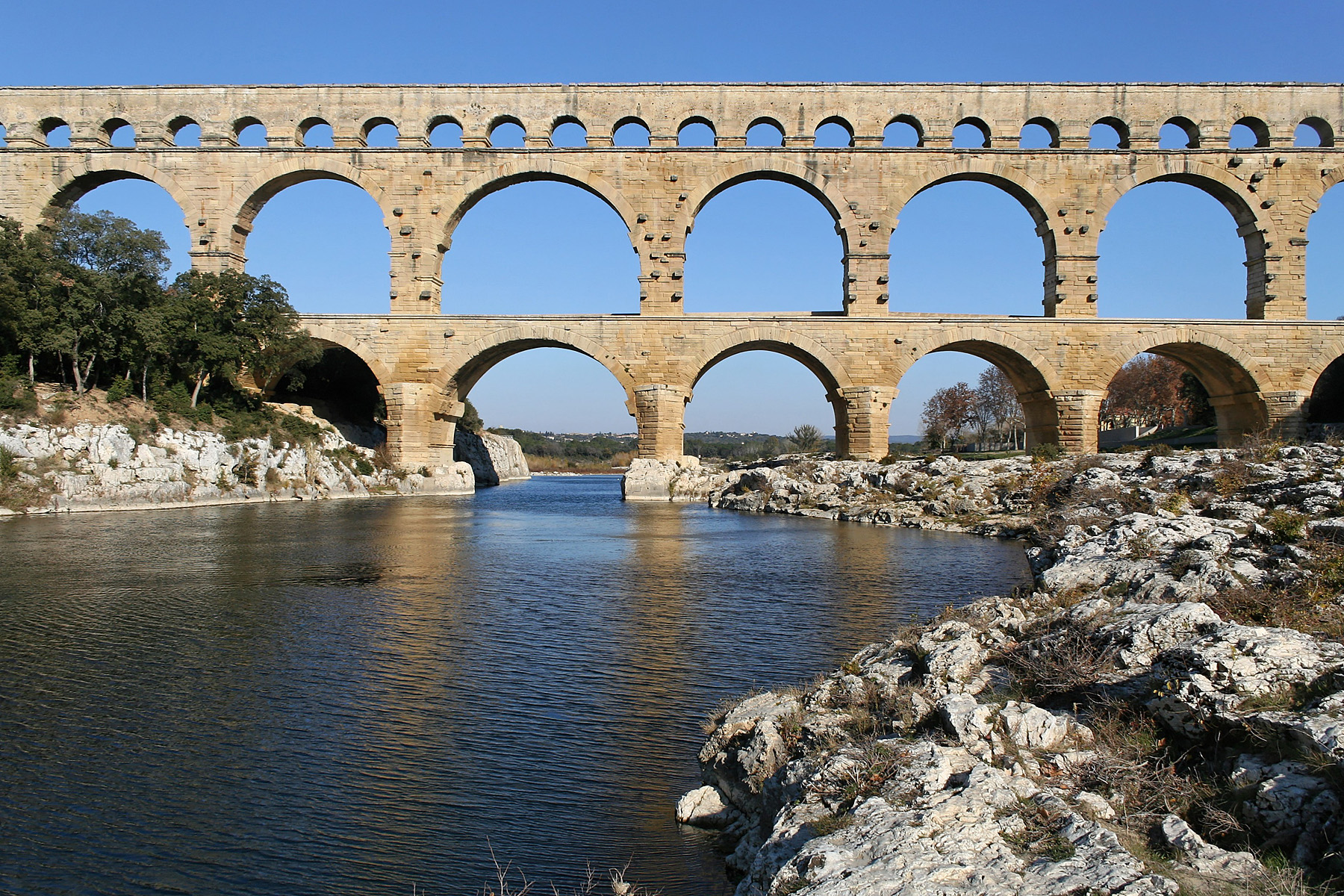
Pont du Gard in France is a Roman aqueduct built in c. 19 BC. It is a World Heritage Site.

Ancient Rome boasted impressive technological feats, using many advancements that were lost in the Middle Ages and not rivalled again until the 19th and 20th centuries. An example of this is insulated glazing, which was not invented again until the 1930s. Many practical Roman innovations were adopted from earlier Greek designs. Advancements were often divided and based on craft. Artisans guarded technologies as trade secrets. (Note: Ancient Roman laws protected against a person corrupting slaves to obtain secrets about the master's arts.)

Roman civil engineering and military engineering constituted a large part of Rome's technological superiority and legacy, and contributed to the construction of hundreds of roads, bridges, aqueducts, public baths, theatres and arenas. Many monuments, such as the Colosseum, Pont du Gard, and Pantheon, remain as testaments to Roman engineering and culture.

The Romans were renowned for their architecture, which is grouped with Greek traditions into "Classical architecture". Although there were many differences from Greek architecture, Rome borrowed heavily from Greece in adhering to strict, formulaic building designs and proportions. Aside from two new orders of columns, composite and Tuscan, and from the dome, which was derived from the Etruscan arch, Rome had relatively few architectural innovations until the end of the Republic.

In the 1st century BC, Romans started to use Roman concrete widely. Concrete was invented in the late 3rd century BC. It was a powerful cement derived from pozzolana, and soon supplanted marble as the chief Roman building material and allowed many daring architectural forms. Also in the 1st century BC, Vitruvius wrote De architectura, possibly the first complete treatise on architecture in history.

The Romans also largely built using timber, causing a rapid decline of the woodlands surrounding Rome. The first evidence of long-distance wood trading come from the discovery of wood planks, felled between AD 40 and 60, coming from the Jura mountains in northeastern France and ending up more than 1,055 miles (1,700 km) away, in the foundations of a lavish portico that was part of a vast wealthy patrician villa, in Central Rome. It is suggested that timber, around 4 metres (13 ft) long, came up to Rome via the Tiber River on ships travelling across the Mediterranean Sea from the confluence of the Saône and Rhône rivers in what is now the city of Lyon in present-day France.

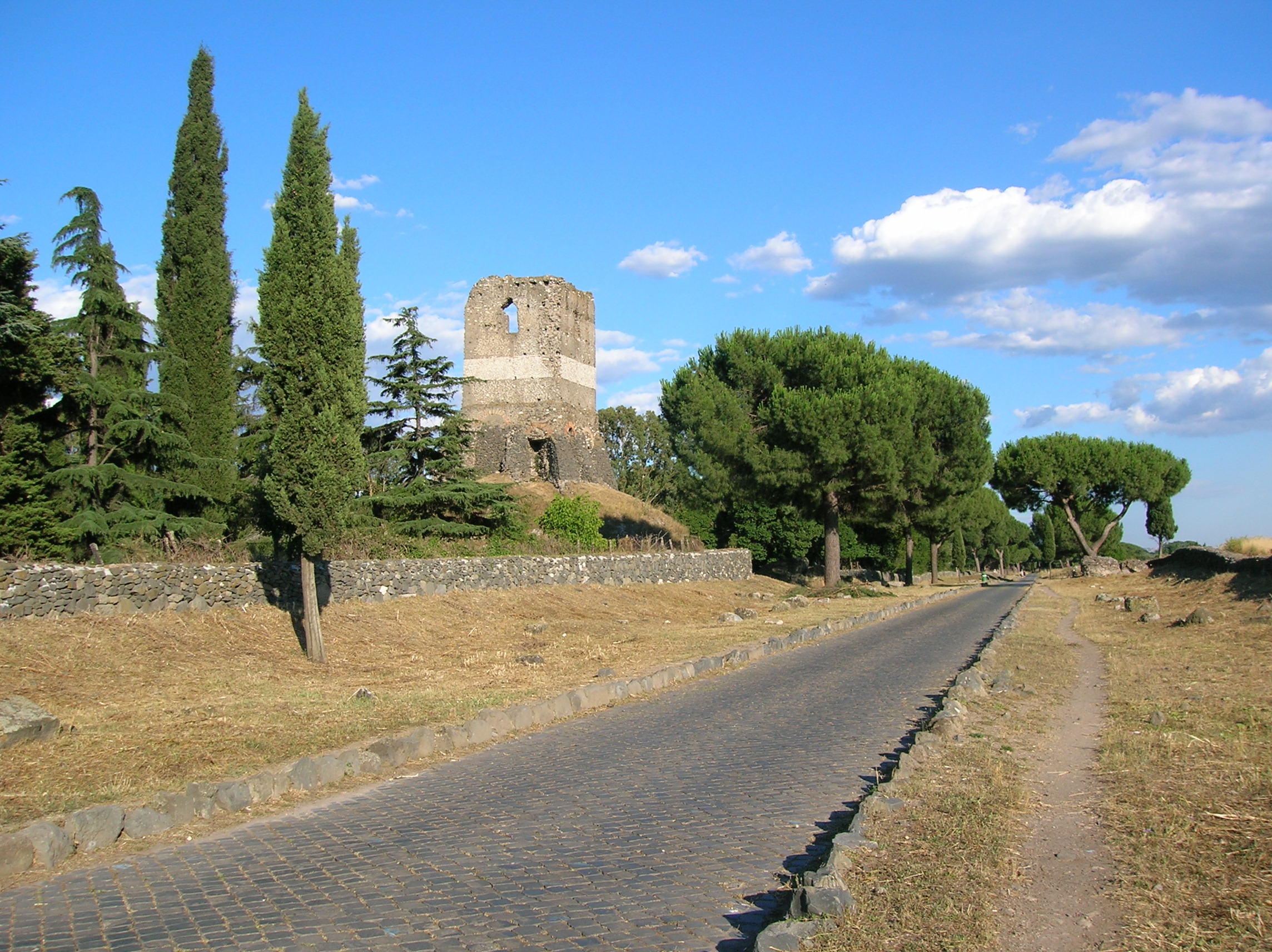
The Appian Way (Via Appia), a road connecting the city of Rome to the southern parts of Italy, remains usable even today

With solid foundations and good drainage, Roman roads were known for their durability and many segments of the Roman road system were still in use a thousand years after the fall of Rome. The construction of a vast and efficient travel network throughout the Empire dramatically increased Rome's power and influence. They allowed Roman legions to be deployed rapidly, with predictable marching times between key points of the empire, no matter the season. These highways also had enormous economic significance, solidifying Rome's role as a trading crossroads—the origin of the saying "all roads lead to Rome". The Roman government maintained a system of way stations, known as the cursus publicus, and established a system of horse relays allowing a dispatch to travel up to 80 km (50 mi) a day.

The Romans constructed numerous aqueducts to supply water to cities and industrial sites and to aid in their agriculture. By the third century, the city of Rome was supplied by 11 aqueducts with a combined length of 450 km (280 mi). The Romans also made major advancements in sanitation. Romans were particularly famous for their public baths, called thermae, which were used for both hygienic and social purposes. Many Roman houses had flush toilets and indoor plumbing, and a complex sewer system, the Cloaca Maxima, was used to drain the local marshes and carry waste into the Tiber. Some historians have speculated that lead pipes in the sewer and plumbing systems led to widespread lead poisoning, which contributed to fall of Rome; however, lead content would have been minimised.

== Legacy ==
Ancient Rome is the progenitor of Western civilisation. The customs, religion, law, technology, architecture, political system, military, literature, languages, alphabet, government and many factors and aspects of western civilisation are all inherited from Roman advancements. The rediscovery of Roman culture revitalised Western civilisation, playing a role in the Renaissance and the Age of Enlightenment.

== Historiography ==
=== Primary and secondary sources ===
The two longest ancient accounts of the Roman history, the histories of Livy and Dionysius of Halicarnassus, were composed 500 years later than the date for the founding of the republic and 200 years from the defeat of Hannibal. Although there has been a diversity of works on ancient Roman history, many of them are lost. As a result of this loss, there are gaps in Roman history, which are filled by unreliable works, such as the Historia Augusta. Caesar wrote his own accounts of his military campaigns in Gaul and during the Civil War in part to impress his contemporaries.

In the Empire, the biographies of famous men and early emperors flourished, examples being The Twelve Caesars of Suetonius, and Plutarch's Parallel Lives. Other major works of Imperial times were that of Livy and Tacitus.

- Polybius – The Histories
- Sallust – Bellum Catilinae and Bellum Jugurthinum
- Julius Caesar – De Bello Gallico and De Bello Civili
- Livy – Ab urbe condita
- Dionysius of Halicarnassus – Roman Antiquities
- Pliny the Elder – Naturalis Historia
- Josephus – The Jewish War
- Suetonius – The Twelve Caesars (De Vita Caesarum)
- Tacitus – Annales and Histories
- Plutarch – Parallel Lives (a series of biographies of famous Roman and Greek men)
- Cassius Dio – Historia Romana
- Herodian – History of the Roman Empire since Marcus Aurelius
- Ammianus Marcellinus – Res Gestae

Interest in studying, and idealising, ancient Rome became prevalent during the Italian Renaissance. Edward Gibbon's The History of the Decline and Fall of the Roman Empire "began the modern study of Roman history in the English-speaking world". Barthold Georg Niebuhr was a founder of the examination of ancient Roman history and wrote The Roman History, tracing the period until the First Punic War. During the Napoleonic, The History of Romans by Victor Duruy highlighted the Caesarean period popular at the time. History of Rome, Roman constitutional law and Corpus Inscriptionum Latinarum, all by Theodor Mommsen, became milestones.

- Edward Gibbon – The History of the Decline and Fall of the Roman Empire
- John Bagnall Bury – History of the Later Roman Empire
- Michael Grant – The Roman World
- Barbara Levick – Claudius
- Barthold Georg Niebuhr
- Michael Rostovtzeff
- Howard Hayes Scullard – A History of the Roman World
- Ronald Syme – The Roman Revolution
- Adrian Goldsworthy – Caesar: The Life of a Colossus and How Rome fell
- Mary Beard – SPQR: A History of Ancient Rome

== See also ==
- Outline of classical studies
  - Outline of ancient Rome
  - Timeline of Roman history
  - Index of ancient Rome–related articles
- Regions in Greco-Roman antiquity
- List of ancient Romans
- List of Roman emperors
- List of Roman civil wars and revolts
- Byzantine Empire
- History of the Roman Empire
- Roman army
- List of archaeologically attested women from the ancient Mediterranean region
- Ancient Roman symbols of monetary and weight units

== Bibliography ==
=== Primary Sources ===
- Ammianus Marcellinus (1894) [c. 392]. Roman History. Translated by Yonge, Charles Duke. George Bell & Sons.
- Caesar, Gaius Julius (1982) [58–49 BCE]. The Conquest of Gaul. Translated by S.A. Handford. Revised and with a new introduction by Jane F. Gardner. Penguin Books. ISBN 9780140444339.
- Caesar, Gaius Julius (1957) [c. 46 BCE]. The Civil Wars (PDF) (in Latin and English). Translated by A.G. Peskett. William Heinemann.
- Cassius Dio (1914–1927) [c. 230 CE]. Dio's Roman History in nine volumes (in Greek and English). Translated by Cary, Earnest; Foster, Herbert B. William Heinemann / Macmillan / G. P. Putnam's Sons / Harvard University Press. Online text at penelope.uchicago.edu.
- Dionysius of Halicarnassus (1937–1960) [7 BCE]. Roman Antiquities (PDF). (7 volumes) (in Greek and English). Vol. 1 - Books I and II. Translated by Cary, Earnest. Harvard University Press / William Heinemann. Online text of Book IV at The Claremont Colleges Library.
- Disputed Authorship (1921–1932) [late 4th century CE]. Historia Augusta. LCL # 139, 140, 263 (in Latin and English). Translated by David Magie. Heinemann / Putnam. Online text at Internet Archive and penelope.uchicago.edu.
- Herodian of Antioch (1961) [c. 244 CE]. History of the Roman Empire From the Death of Marcus Aurelius to the Accession of Gordian III. Translated by Edward C. Echols. University of California Press. Online text at livius.org.
- Flavius Josephus (2009). Wars of the Jews. Translated by William Whiston. Project Gutenberg EBook #2850.
- Lactantius (1885–2009) [c. 316 CE]. "De Mortibus Persecutorum (Of the Manner in Which the Persecutors Died)". In Schaff, Philip (ed.). Ante-Nicene Father (PDF). Vol. VII (American ed.). Eerdmans.
- Livy (1998) [c. 27 BCE]. The Rise of Rome. (Books 1–5). Translated by Luce, T.J. Oxford University Press. ISBN 9780192822963.
- Pliny the Elder (1857) [c. 77–79 CE]. Natural History. In six volumes. Translated by John Bostock; Henry Thomas Riley. Henry George Bohn. Volume 6. See also online text at perseus.tufts.edu.
- Plutarch (1920) [c. 100 CE]. Lives. Loeb Classical Library. Translated by Bernadotte Perrin. Harvard University Press.
- C. Suetonius Tranquillus (1914) [121 CE]. The Lives of the Caesars. Two volumes. Translated by John C. Rolfe. William Heinemann / Macmillan. Volume 1, Volume 2. Online text at penelope.uchicago.edu.
- Tacitus (1937) [c. 120 CE]. Annals - Book 13-16. Loeb Classical Library. Translated by John Jackson. Harvard University Press – via penelope.uchicago.edu.

=== Secondary Sources ===
- Adkins, Lesley; Adkins, Roy A. (1998). Handbook to Life in Ancient Rome. Oxford University Press. ISBN 9780195123326.
- Artman, John H. (1991). Ancient Rome - Independent Learning Unit. Illustrations by Susan Kropa. Parsippany: Good Apple. ISBN 9780866536387.
- Beard, Mary (2015). SPQR: A History of Ancient Rome. Profile Books. ISBN 9781847654410.
- Boatwright, Mary T.; Gargola, Daniel J.; Talbert, Richard J.A. (2012). The Romans: From Village to Empire (2nd ed.). Oxford University Press. ISBN 9780199730575.
- Brennan, T. Corey (2004). "Power and Process Under the Republican 'Constitution". In Flower, Harriet I. (ed.). The Cambridge Companion to the Roman Republic. Cambridge University Press. ISBN 9780521003902.
- Bury, John Bagnell (1923) [1889]. A History of the Later Roman Empire - From Arcadius to Irene (395 AD to 800 AD). MacMillan and Co. Se also online text at penelope.uchicago.edu.
- Cary, Max (1967). A History of Rome Down to the Reign of Constantine (2nd ed.). St. Martin's Press.
- Casson, Lionel (1998). Everyday Life in Ancient Rome. JHU Press. ISBN 9780801859922.
- Cornell, Tim J. (1995). The beginnings of Rome: Italy and Rome from the Bronze Age to the Punic Wars (c. 1000–264 BC). Routledge. ISBN 0415015960. OCLC 31515793.
- Duiker, William; Spielvogel, Jackson (2001). World History (3rd ed.). Wadsworth. ISBN 9780534571689. OL 6786176M.
- Durant, Will; Durant, Ariel (1993) [1944]. The Story of Civilization. Vol. III - Caesar and Christ. Fine Communications. ISBN 9781567310238.
- Elton, Hugh (1996). Warfare in Roman Europe AD 350–425. Clarendon Press. ISBN 9780198150077.
- Furet, François; Ozouf, Mona, eds. (1989). A Critical Dictionary of the French Revolution. Harvard University Press. ISBN 9780674177284.
- Gibbon, Edward (1836) [1776–1789]. The History of the Decline and Fall of the Roman Empire. London: Frederick Westley and A.H. Davis. See also 1906 edition at Project Gutenberg.
- Goldsworthy, Adrian Keith (1996). The Roman Army at War: 100 BC – AD 200. Oxford University Press. ISBN 9780198150572.
- Goldsworthy, Adrian Keith (2006a). Caesar: Life of a Colossus. Yale University Press. ISBN 9780300120486.
- Goldsworthy, Adrian Keith (2006). The Fall of Carthage: The Punic Wars 265–146 BC. Phoenix. ISBN 9780304366422.
- Grant, Michael (2001) [1971]. Cities of Vesuvius: Pompeii and Herculaneum. Phoenix press. ISBN 9781842122198.
- Haywood, Richard (1971). The Ancient World. David McKay Company.
- Kaldellis, Anthony (2023). The New Roman Empire: A History of Byzantium. New York: Oxford University Press. doi:10.1093/oso/9780197549322.001.0001. ISBN 978-0-19-754932-2.
- Keegan, John (1993). A History of Warfare. Alfred A. Knopf. ISBN 9780394588018.
- Hawthorn, Geoffrey (1996). "Constitutional Democracy in the South". In Luckham, Robin; White, Gordon (eds.). Democratization in the South: The Jagged Wave. Manchester University Press. ISBN 9780719049422.
- Levick, Barbara (2001) [1990]. Claudius. Routledge. ISBN 9780415166195.
- Mackay, Christopher S. (2004). Ancient Rome: A Military and Political History. Cambridge University Press. ISBN 9780521809184.
- Matyszak, Philip (2003). Chronicle of the Roman Republic. Thames & Hudson. ISBN 9780500051214.
- Miles, Richard (2010). Carthage Must be Destroyed. The Rise and Fall of an Ancient Civilization. Viking. ISBN 9780670022663.
- O'Connell, Robert (1989). Of Arms and Men: A History of War, Weapons, and Aggression. Oxford University Press. ISBN 978-0-19-505359-3.
- Oakley, Stephen (2004). "The Early Republic". In Flower, Harriet I. (ed.). The Cambridge Companion to the Roman Republic. Cambridge University Press. ISBN 9780521003902.
- Potter, David S. (2004). "The Roman Army and Navy". In Flower, Harriet I. (ed.). The Cambridge Companion to the Roman Republic. Cambridge University Press. ISBN 9780521003902.
- Pray Bober, Phyllis B. (1999). Art, Culture, and Cuisine: Ancient and Medieval Gastronomy. University of Chicago Press. ISBN 0226062538.
- Rawson, Beryl (1987). The Family in Ancient Rome: New Perspectives. Cornell University Press. ISBN 9780801494604.
- Rochette, Bruno (2011). "Language Policies in the Roman Republic and Empire". A Companion to the Latin Language. Wiley. pp. 549–563. doi:10.1002/9781444343397.ch30. hdl:2268/35932. ISBN 9781405186056.
- Rochette, Bruno (2018). "Was there a Roman linguistic imperialism during the Republic and the early Principate?". Lingue e Linguaggio (1 - gennaio-giugno): 107–128. doi:10.1418/90426. ISSN 1720-9331.
- Rochette, Bruno (2023). "The Attitude of the Roman Emperors towards Language Practices". In Mullen, Alex (ed.). Social Factors in the Latinization of the Roman West (1st ed.). Oxford University Press. pp. 258–285. ISBN 9780198887294.
- Scarre, Christopher J. (1995). The Penguin Historical Atlas of Ancient Rome. Penguin Books. ISBN 9780140513295.
- Scheidel, Walter; Saller, Richard P.; Morris, Ian (2007). The Cambridge Economic History of the Greco-Roman World. Cambridge University Press. ISBN 978-0-521-78053-7. OL 16929915W.
- Sellers, Mortimer N. (1994). American Republicanism: Roman Ideology in the United States Constitution. NYU Press. ISBN 9780814780053.
- Taagepera, Rein (1979). "Size and Duration of Empires: Growth-Decline Curves, 600 B.C. to 600 A.D." Social Science History. 3 (3/4): 115–138. doi:10.2307/1170959. JSTOR 1170959.
- Turchin, Peter; Adams, Jonathan M.; Hall, Thomas D. (December 2006). "East-West Orientation of Historical Empires" (PDF). Journal of World-Systems Research. 12 (2): 222. doi:10.5195/JWSR.2006.369. ISSN 1076-156X.
- Ward-Perkins, John Bryan (1994) [1970]. Roman Imperial Architecture. Yale University Press. ISBN 9780300052923.
- Werner, Paul (1978). Life in Rome in Ancient Times. Translated by David Macrae. Editions Minerva S.A.
- Willis, Roy G. (1996). World Mythology: The Illustrated Guide. London: Duncan Baird Publishers. ISBN 9781900131506.
