= Ancient Roman symbols of monetary and weight units =

Brief history of the ancient Roman monetary and weight unit symbols

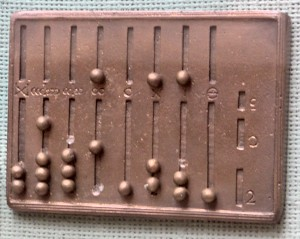
Ancient Roman abacus (reconstruction). Along the edge, symbols of the semuncia, sicilicus, and sextula (or duella)

Symbols of ancient Roman monetary and weight units are brief designations of such ancient Roman coins as the denarius, quinarius, sestertius, as, as well as some other monetary, accounting, and weight units of Ancient Rome. They appeared during the late Roman Republic (264–27 BC) both on the coins themselves and in written documents; some were used until the 20th century, for example, the symbol of the scruple in the apothecaries' system of weights. In most cases, they consist of:

- Roman numerals, crossed out or uncrossed with a horizontal stroke (equivalent value in asses or sesterces);
- Greek letter-numerals (equivalent value in nummia);
- counting dots or strokes (equivalent value in unciae), in some cases with the addition of the letter S—abbreviation of the word "semis" (Latin: semis —half);
- abbreviations of the names of the corresponding accounting and weight units in Latin, ancient Greek, or ancient Egyptian languages.

In the case of monetary units, the symbols are, as a rule, no more than nominals, denoting the value of the corresponding unit in asses, nummia, etc. In some cases, one can speak of the emergence of an independent symbol of the monetary unit itself — for example, the denarius symbol, which represents a crossed-out Roman numeral "ten" (𐆖, ~~X~~).

== Symbols of weight units ==
=== Ancient symbols ===
The basis of the ancient Roman monetary system, like any other ancient monetary system, lay in units of weight. Most of them derive from ancient Roman names of duodecimal fractions — the minutiae (sextans, uncia, semuncia, sextula, etc.), but some have original names: "libra", "sicilicus", "scruple", "siliqua", "grain".

Thus, the "sicilicus" (Latin: sicilicus), like the name of the ancient Roman province of Sicily (Latin: Sicilia), which was the granary of ancient Rome, derives from the word "sickle" (Latin: sicilis); sicilicus was the name of the sickle-shaped diacritic mark used in writing. Another version states that the symbol of the sicilicus, which was equivalent to a quarter of an uncia and sometimes called "quartuncia" (Latin: quartuncia), derives from the ancient Greek symbol, meaning a quarter in the Attic numeral system.

The siliqua derives from the name of the seeds of the carob tree (Latin: Ceratonia siliqua); the grain (Latin: granum) is simply a grain, a speck (as a unit of weight, equivalent, according to various sources, to the mass of a barley or wheat grain); the meaning of the word "scruple" (Latin: scrupulum, scripulus) is a small sharp pebble.

Libra (Latin: libra) is weight, scales, balance, equilibrium. The ancient Romans abbreviated the word libra to libr, lib, L or lb, placing the last sign, for example, on a weight of 327.45 grams. This weight standard received the name libral (Roman) weight (pound)—libra pondo (from Latin: pondus—weight, heaviness).

Along with the libra, the key weight units of ancient Rome were such fractions of it as:

- the uncia, equal to 1/12 of a libra and equivalent to 27.29 grams;
- the scruple, equal to 1/24 of an uncia or 1/288 of a libra and equivalent to 1.14 grams.

The weight and nominals of copper (bronze) coins were tied to the uncia, and those of silver and gold to the scruple.

Weight units had their own symbols. Those included in the Unicode standard are presented in the table. Other variants of the script can be found in the sources listed in the section "Additional illustrations".

Name of the weight unit		Symbol of the weight unit			Image of the symbol	Equivalent of the unit of weight in grams	Ratio of weight units		
in Latin	literal meaning	grapheme and position in Unicode		HTML	Image of the symbol	Equivalent of the unit of weight in grams	to libra	to uncia	to scruple
Libra	Weight	—		lb, L, Ɫ		≈ 327.45	1	12	288
Sextans	Sixth [part] of the as	𐆐	U+10190	=, z		≈ 54.58	1/6	2	48
Uncia	Twelfth [part]	𐆑	U+10191	-, ~, ^{‿}		≈ 27.29	1/12	1	24
Semuncia	Half of the twelfth [part] (half-uncia)	𐆒	U+10192	Σ, Є, £		≈ 13.64	1/24	1/2	12
Binae sextulae, duella	Two sixths [parts] of the twelfth [part] (third of uncia)	𐆓𐆓	U+10193+10193	ƧƧ		≈ 9.10	1/36	1/3	8
Quartuncia (sicilicus)	Quarter of the twelfth [part] (quarter of uncia)	𐅀	U+10140	Ɔ or)		≈ 6.82	1/48	1/4	6
Sextula	Sixth [part] of the twelfth [part] (sixth part of uncia)	𐆓	U+10193	Ƨ, ς		≈ 4.55	1/72	1/6	4
Dimidia sextula	Half of the sixth [part] of the twelfth [part] (twelfth part of uncia)	𐆔	U+10194	~~Ƨ~~		≈ 2.28	1/144	1/12	2
Scrupulum (scripulum, scripulis)	Small sharp pebble	℈	U+2108	Э		≈ 1.14	1/288	1/24	1
Siliqua	Pod; fruit, seed of the carob tree	𐆕	U+10195	)) or »		≈ 0.19	1/1728	1/144	1/6
Granum	Grain [barley or wheat], speck	—				≈ 0.06	1/5760	1/480	1/20

=== Modern symbols ===
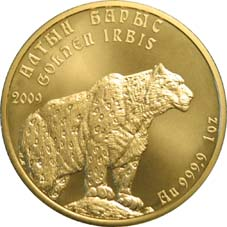
Modern, 2009, coin of 100 tenge with gold content of 1 troy ounce (oz)

Some ancient Roman weight units, as well as the Greek dram included in the Roman system of measures, were used until the introduction of the metric system and had their own symbols. Below are the symbols of the apothecaries' system of weights. Two of them—the symbols of the dram and uncia—derive from ancient Egyptian numerals (a variety of hieratic script) and became a pan-European standard with the publication in 1140 of the pharmacopoeia "Antidotarium", compiled by the rector of the Medical School of Salerno Nicholas. As the symbol of the grain, its abbreviation was usually used—gr. The symbol of the libra, which was increasingly called the pound, remained practically the same as in ancient Rome—lb, but in medieval German states it began to be crossed out: ℔. At the same time, the meaning of such crossing out is not fully understood.

One of the few countries where ancient weight units and their ancient symbols are still used is the United States. The American weight system is thereby divided into three subsystems:

- commercial, sometimes called avoirdupois (English: avoirdupois from French avoirdupois — "goods sold by weight");
- troy, coin, or assay (English: troy—from the French city of Troyes, one of the centers of medieval trade);
- apothecary (English: apothecary).

The second and third are almost identical in ratios and mass values of weight units, but differ slightly in the units of weight used themselves (for example, the dram and scruple are not included in the troy system). But the commercial one differs substantially from them: one commercial pound is equivalent not to 373.24 grams, as in the modern Anglo-American troy and apothecary systems, but to 453.59 grams; a pound includes not 12 ounces, but 16. Finally, ancient symbols are not used in the commercial and troy systems.

To identify the system to which the used weight unit belongs, the following extension follows its abbreviation:

- avdp—for the commercial system (e.g., commercial ounce—oz avdp);
- ap—for the apothecary (oz ap);
- t—for the troy (oz t).

However, these extensions may be omitted if it is clear from the context which system the unit of weight belongs to.

Weight unit	Symbol of the weight unit in Unicode		Symbol of the weight unit in the American system of measures			Equivalent of the weight unit in various weight systems			Ratio of weight units			
Weight unit	Grapheme	Position	Apothecary	Troy	Commercial	Russian until the 20th century	Modern troy	Modern commercial	to libra	to uncia	to dram	to scruple
Pound (libra)	℔	U+2114	lb ap	lb t	lb, lb avdp, #	358.32 g	373.24 g	453.59 g	1 (1)	12 (16)	96 (256)	288 (—)
Ounce	℥	U+2125	℥, oz ap	oz t	oz, oz avdp	29.86 g	31.10 g	28.35 g	1/12 (1/16)	1 (1)	8 (16)	24 (—)
Dram	ʒ	U+0292	ʒ, dr ap	—	dr, dr avdp	3.73 g	3.89 g	1.77 g	1/96 (1/256)	1/8 (1/16)	1 (1)	3 (—)
Scruple	℈	U+2108	℈, s ap	—	—	1.24 g	1.30 g	—	1/288 (—)	1/24 (—)	1/3 (—)	1 (—)
Grain	—		gr.			62.209 mg	64.799 mg		1/5760 (1/7000)	1/480 (2/875)	1/60 (32/875)	1/20 (—)

== Symbols (denominations) of currency units of the Roman Republic ==
=== Brief history of the coinage system ===
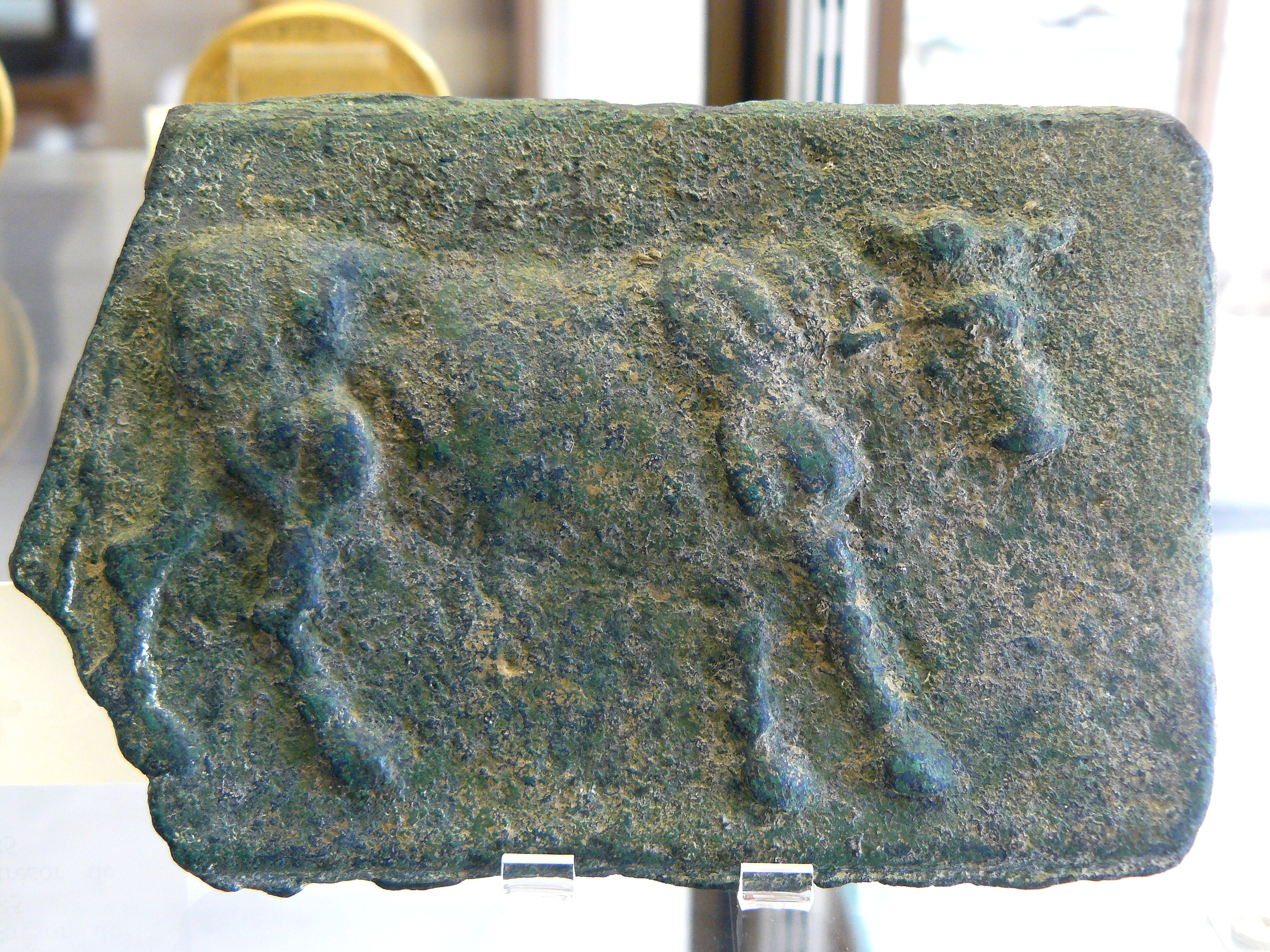
Aes signatum – ingots of unprocessed copper with images or ornaments that performed the functions of money in ancient Rome

Sometimes the first Roman coins' appearance is associated with the name of the reformer king Servius Tullius (578–535 BC), but according to the author of the book Roman Coins Harold Mattingly, coins in Rome began to be minted shortly before 289 BC, when the institution of monetarii, officials in charge of minting, was introduced, and more precisely, around 312 BC (hereinafter the chronology of Roman coin minting is given according to Mattingly). These coins, which received the general name "heavy bronze" (Latin: Aes grave), were the bronze as (Latin: as from Latin: aes – copper, bronze; or from Latin: assula – unit, whole, ingot), as well as its derivatives: Semis (1/2 as), Triens (1/3), Quadrans (1/4), Sextans (1/6), uncia (1/12) and others. Initially, the as weighed 1 libra (As libralis), but then its mass steadily decreased: in 289 BC – to 1/2 libra, in 268 – to 1/6, in 217 – to 1/12, finally, in 89 – to 1/24 libra. In 268 BC, in addition to copper (bronze) coins, Rome began to mint silver denarii, weighing 4 scruples (4.55 g). Based on the ratio of prices for copper and silver established by that time (120:1), 1 denarius was equated to 10 asses. In 217 BC, simultaneously with the reduction of the as weight to 1/12 libra, Rome devalued the denarius – to 3 1/2 scruples. As a result, its value was equated to 16 asses, and this ratio (1:16) was preserved until the reforms of Augustus. A little later (in 209 BC), gold coins weighing 6, 3, 2, and 1 scruple were first, but briefly, put into circulation. The last monetary reform of the Roman Republic was carried out in 89 BC in accordance with the law of Plautius–Papirius. Having reduced the weight of the as to 1/24 libra, but keeping the weight of silver coins unchanged, as well as the ratio of the denarius to the as (1:16), Rome essentially turned copper coins into fiat money.

=== Copper uncia, Semis, as, dupondius and others ===
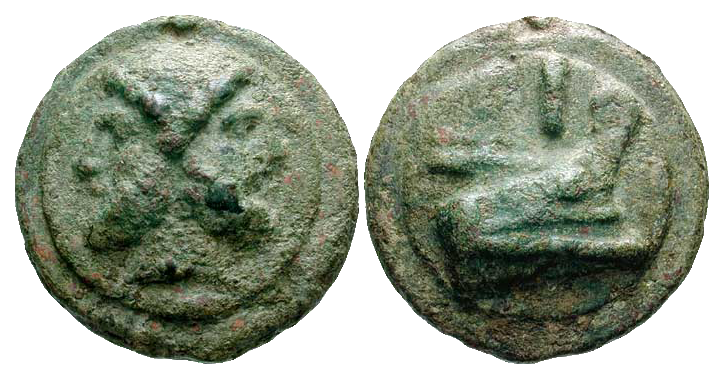
As

The as was the key currency unit of the Roman Republic, from which all other denominations of both copper (bronze) and silver coins were derived for a long time. The second important currency unit was the uncia (Latin: uncia, which means "twelfth part"). As noted above, the initial weight of the as was 1 libra or 12 unciae. At the same time, the uncia was also the name of a coin equal to 1/12 as. Over time, the weight of the as decreased, so starting from 289 BC, the concepts of "uncia as a weight unit" and "uncia as a monetary (or accounting) unit" began to diverge. In both cases, it was 1/12 of the whole, but in the first case – of the libra, in the second – of the as. In 217 BC, the weight of the as was reduced to 1/12 libra. As a result, it itself became equal to the weight uncia, while having the accounting uncia as a derivative. The first retained its meaning in the system of measures and weights to this day, the second disappeared along with the cessation of minting the corresponding coin. Roman numerals I were minted on asses, the denomination of the coin. Larger copper coins were the Dupondius, trioondius (tressis), Quincussis and Decussis. Their denominations corresponded to the value in asses and were designated by Roman numerals II, III, V and X respectively. In addition, a coin of 4 asses denomination – the Quadrussis – was issued, but its denomination was not marked. The denominations of smaller currency units had a slightly different system of construction – from the uncia and from the Semis. The traditional designation of the uncia denomination (1/12 as) is a dot (•), semiss (1/2 as) – the letter S. Denominations from 2/12 to 5/12 as were designated by the corresponding number of dots from two to five, denominations from 7/12 to 11/12 as – by the letter S and the same dots. The dot could be replaced by a symbol similar to a hyphen (-), and several dots or "hyphens" could be arranged in two rows (for example, =-= or :·:).

=== Silver sestertius, quinarius and denarius ===
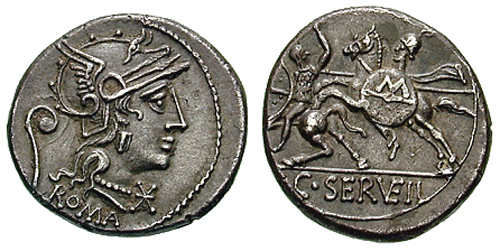
Silver denarius with the symbol 𐆖

The Denarius (Latin: denarius) first appeared in 268 BC and for a long time became the most common silver coin of ancient Rome, and then of the Western European states of the Middle Ages. Its weight was set at 4 scruples (4.55 g), and its denomination – at 10 asses. Hence the name of the coin, which literally means "consisting of ten", and its symbol – the Roman numeral X. As noted in the brief overview of the history of the ancient Roman coinage system, in 217 BC the denarius became equal not to ten, but to sixteen asses – "consisting of ten" turned into "consisting of sixteen", but retained its former name (it should be clarified that the payment of salaries to legionaries stationed in the provinces, even after the reform, continued in denarii at the rate of not 1:16, but 1:10 until the reform of Augustus). The unit symbol also remained unchanged – X, which appears on almost all denarii until 150 BC. Only on a small group of coins from 150 to 145 BC is the sign XVI minted. Then the symbol X appears again and in parallel – ~~X.~~ After 110 BC, value marks on denarii are not found except for very rare exceptions (the last denarius with the symbol 𐆖 from Mattingly's catalog is dated to 81 BC). Harold Mattingly believed that coins with the sign 𐆖 were minted for the provinces, while denarii with the sign X – for Rome itself. According to Karl Menninger, the symbol X began to be crossed out in order to distinguish the old denarius, which consisted of 10 asses, from the new one, consisting of 16. Thus, the symbol 𐆖 became not a denomination designation, but a symbol of the currency unit itself – the denarius as an independent, and not derivative from the as denomination. The same conclusion is drawn by researchers of tablets from the British fort Vindolanda, written ancient Roman documents of the 1st–2nd centuries AD. The Quinarius (Latin: quinarius) is a silver coin weighing 2 scruples and equal to 1/2 denarius. Literally means "consisting of five", since in the period from 268 to 217 BC the quinarius was equal to 5 asses. Hence the symbol – the Roman numeral V (or ~~V~~).

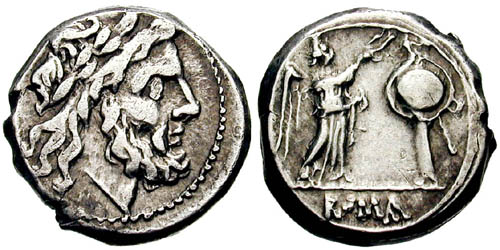
Silver victoriatus

The Sestertius (Latin: sestertius) is a silver coin, initially weighing 1 scruple and equal to ¼ denarius. Literally means "half of the third" (Latin: semis + tertius), that is, two and a half (by analogy with the Russian language: "half past two" – two hours thirty minutes), since in the period from 268 to 217 BC the sestertius was equal to 2 asses and 1 semis (1/2 as). Hence the origin of the symbol – IIS, that is "two asses (II) and semis (S)". In 217 BC, the reduction in the weight of the denarius had almost no effect on the sestertius – its weight also decreased, but remained close to 1 scruple. Probably, therefore, it was in sestertii that the denominations of gold coins were indicated, the minting of which began in 209 BC (from 89 BC, the sestertius, due to its proximity to 1 scruple, generally became the main unit of monetary accounting in the ancient Roman coinage system, replacing the as in this capacity). It is also worth mentioning such a basic currency unit of ancient Rome as the Victoriatus (Latin: victoriatus – from the image of the goddess Victoria on one side of the coin), which did not have its own symbol. The minting of this silver coin began simultaneously with the denarius and continued approximately until the beginning of the 2nd century AD. Its initial weight was 3.41 g, and the value 3/4 denarius (7 1/2 asses), eventually decreasing to 1/2 denarius (5 asses). The victoriatus is notable in that it was intended not for the metropolis, but for the provinces and conquered territories. Only occasionally was a half-victoriatus issued with the letter S minted (from Latin: semis – half).

=== Gold coins ===
In 209 BC, the Roman Republic first issued a limited issue of gold coins weighing 1, 2, 3, and 6 scruples. Their denominations are designated by Roman numerals XX, XXXX, and LX (the 6-scruple coin without denomination indication). In Michael Crawford's catalog Roman Republican Coinage (RRC) these numerals are deciphered as the denomination of the coin in asses. Harold Mattingly believes that the denominations are expressed in sestertii, which gradually became the basic accounting unit. Similar denominations (for example, X or XXV) also appeared on gold coins of some Roman provinces.

=== Table of symbols (denominations) of republican coins ===
This section presents all key and some secondary coins of the Roman Republic. The symbols used on them are, as a rule, no more than denominations indicating the value of the corresponding unit in asses and/or sestertii.

Name of the currency unit			Ratio to the as	Designation of the denomination of the currency unit		
in English	in Latin	literal meaning	Ratio to the as	HTML code	Symbol in Unicode (position)	Example of use
Gold coins
Gold coin weighing 3 scruples	—		150 (240) / 60 (96)	LX	ↆX (2186 + 2169)	
Gold coin weighing 2 scruples	—		100 (160) / 40 (64)	XXXX	—	
Gold coin weighing 1/4 scruples	—		— (100) / 25 (40)	XXV	—	
Gold coin weighing 1 scruple	—		50 (80) / 20 (32)	XX	—	
Gold coin weighing 1/2 scruples	—		25 (40) / 10 (16)	X	—	
Silver coins
2 denarii	—		20 (32)	XX	—	
Denarius	Denarius	Consisting of ten	10 (16)	X, 𐆖, XVI	𐆖 (10196)	
Quinarius	Quinarius	Consisting of five	5 (8)	V, ~~V~~, S	𐆗 (10197)	
Sestertius	Sestertius	"Half third" (two and a half)	2 1/2 (4)	IIS, ~~IIS~~, ~~IS~~, ~~SS~~, ~~S~~, ~~Σ~~, HS	𐆘 (10198)	
Copper (bronze) coins
Decussis	Decussis	Ten asses	10	X	—	
Quincussis	Quincussis	Five asses	5	V	—	
Tressis (tripondius)	Tressis (tripondius)	Three asses (triple weight)	3	III	—	
Dupondius	Dupondius	Double weight	2	II, ~~II~~, B	𐆙 (10199)	
As	As, ass, assis	Copper (bronze), unit (whole)	1	I, ~~I~~, 𐌋 (1030B), 𐌝 (1031D)	𐆚 (1019A)	
Deunx	Deunx	As without uncia	11/12	S••••• (S=-=, S:·:)	—	Coins of the corresponding denomination were not minted. The currency unit was used exclusively as an accounting unit
Dextans	Dextans	As without sixth part	10/12	S•••• (S==, S::)	—	
Dodrans	Dodrans	As without quarter	9/12	S••• (S=-, S:·)	—	
Bes	Bes	Double triens (third)	8/12	S•• (S=, S:)	—	
Septunx	Septunx	Seven twelfths	7/12	S• (S-)	—	Coins of the corresponding denomination were not minted. The currency unit was used exclusively as an accounting unit
Semis (semissis)	Semis (semissis)	Half (half-as)	6/12	S, )	—	
Quincunx	Quincunx	Five twelfths	5/12	••••• (=-=, :·:)	—	
Triens	Triens	Third	4/12	•••• (==, ::)	—	
Quadrans (teruncia)	Quadrans (teruncia)	Quarter (three unciae)	3/12	••• (=-, :·)	—	
Sextans	Sextans	Sixth	2/12	•• (=, z)	—	
Sescuncia	Sescuncia	Half with uncia (one and a half unciae)	1/8(1/2 uncia)	Σ• (Σ-)	𐆒• (10192 + "dot")	
Uncia	Uncia	Twelfth	1/12	• (-)	—	
Semuncia	Semuncia	Half-uncia	1/24(1/2 uncia)	Σ, (, ^{‿}	𐆒 (10192)	
Quartuncia	Quartuncia	Quarter uncia	1/48(1/4 uncia)	—		

== Symbols (denominations) of monetary units of the Roman Empire ==
=== Brief characteristics of the period ===
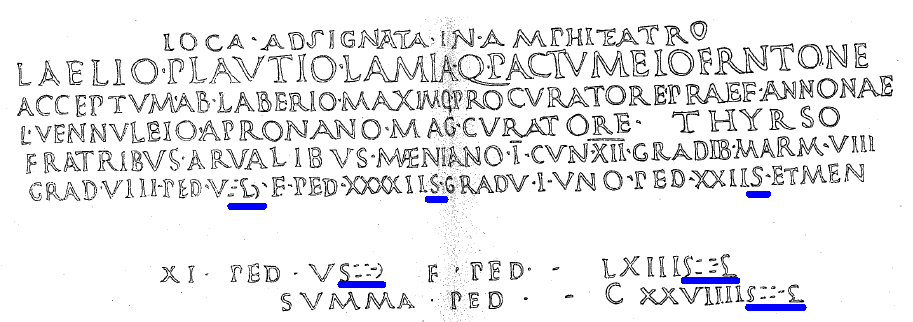
Document from 80 AD with symbols of monetary units:line 6 — :·Σ) (quadrans, semuncia and sicilicus), S and S (semissis);line 7 — S::·) (deunx and sicilicus), S::·Σ (deunx and semuncia); line 8 — S::·Σ (deunx and semuncia)

If in the republican period the indication of the denomination of a monetary unit was more of a rule, then in the imperial period (27BC – 476AD) it became more of an exception. The denomination of a coin was determined based on its metal and weight. Symbols continued to be used, but in documents, not on coins (see the section Symbols of monetary units in written sources). On coins, the denomination, if indicated at all, was:

- as a rule, on coins of Roman provinces, not the metropolis;
- not on large (gold and silver) coins, but on small — copper (bronze) or low-grade silver ones.

Denominations appeared on local coins at the end of the 2nd century AD, which, apparently, was associated with the unification of monetary circulation in the Empire and the beginning of the transition from local to the general imperial monetary system. A characteristic feature of the provincial coins of the Roman Empire is that denominations were often indicated not with Roman, but with Greek numerals. This is typical for coins of Greece, Asia Minor, the Black Sea region, that is, provinces with strong Greek influence. The meaning of many symbols, which are obviously denominations, has not yet been deciphered. Often, modern researchers do not even know the names of most provincial monetary signs and in descriptions in catalogs indicate only the metal from which the coin is made, as well as its diameter. For example, a bronze coin with a diameter of 25 millimeters is designated as Æ 25. The tradition of regular minting of denominations on general imperial coins was revived only in the Byzantine Empire at the end of the 5th century under Anastasius I on follises, whose value was expressed in nummi.

=== Examples of denomination designations on follises of the 5th–6th centuries ===
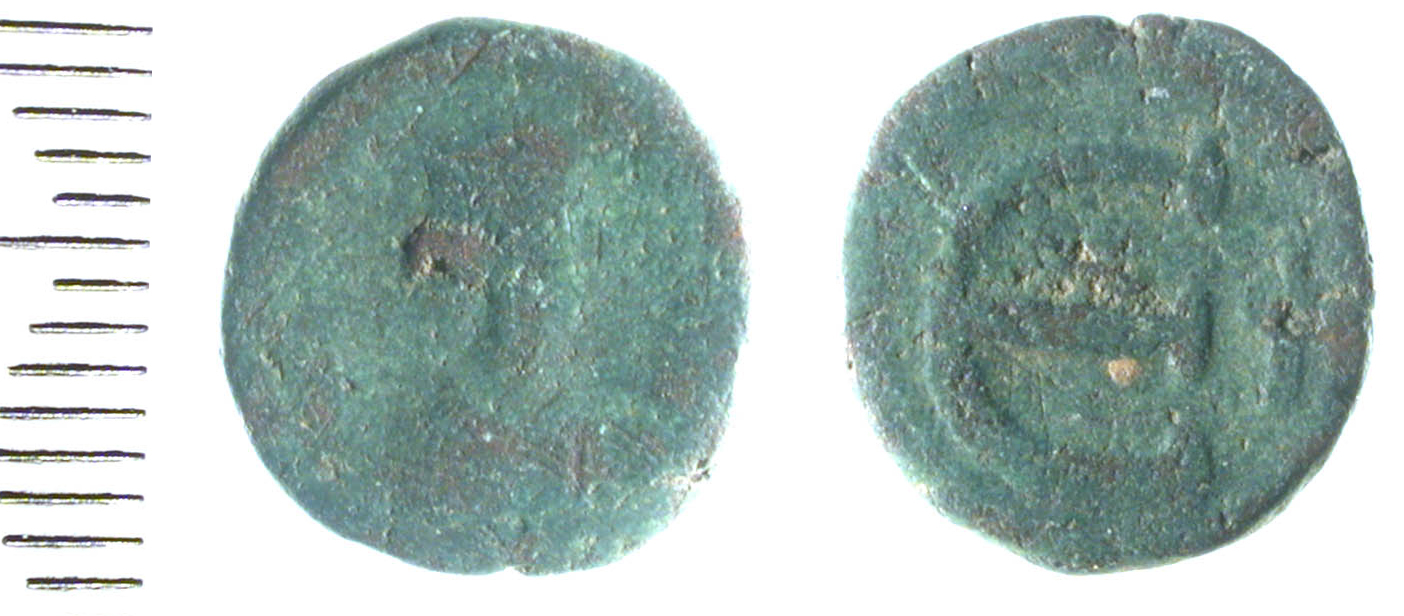
Ε, ε = 5 nummi

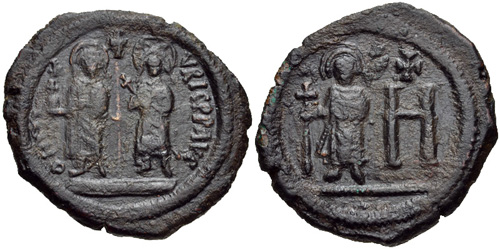
Η, η = 8 nummi

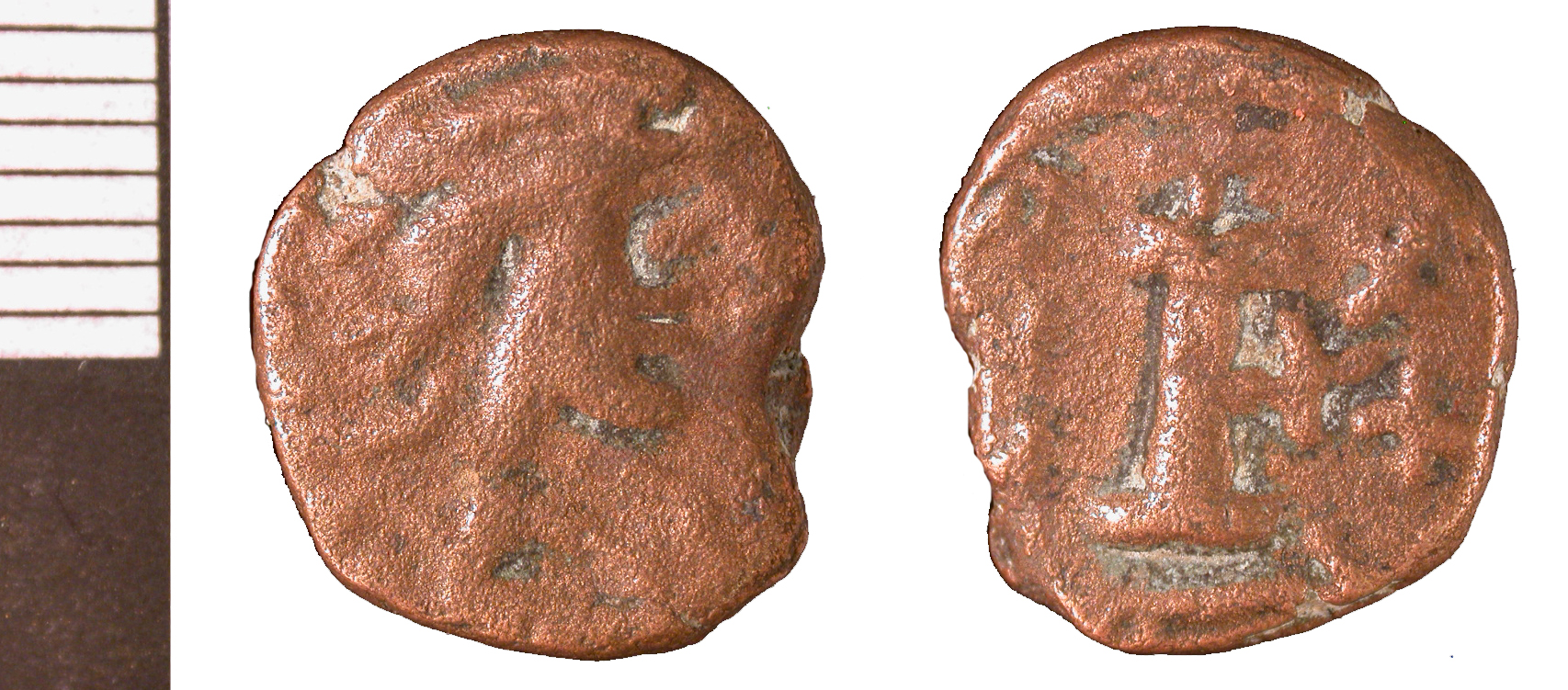
Ι, ι = 10 nummi

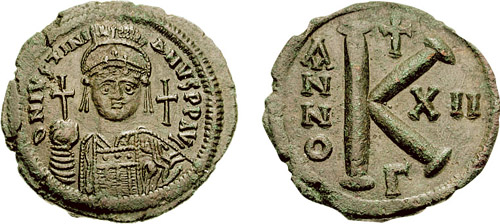
Κ, κ = 20 nummi

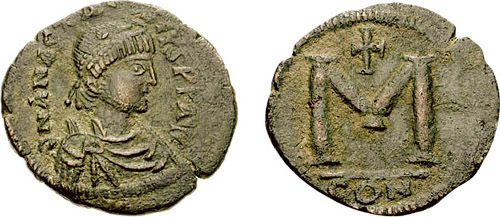
Μ, μ = 40 nummi

== Symbols of monetary units in written sources ==
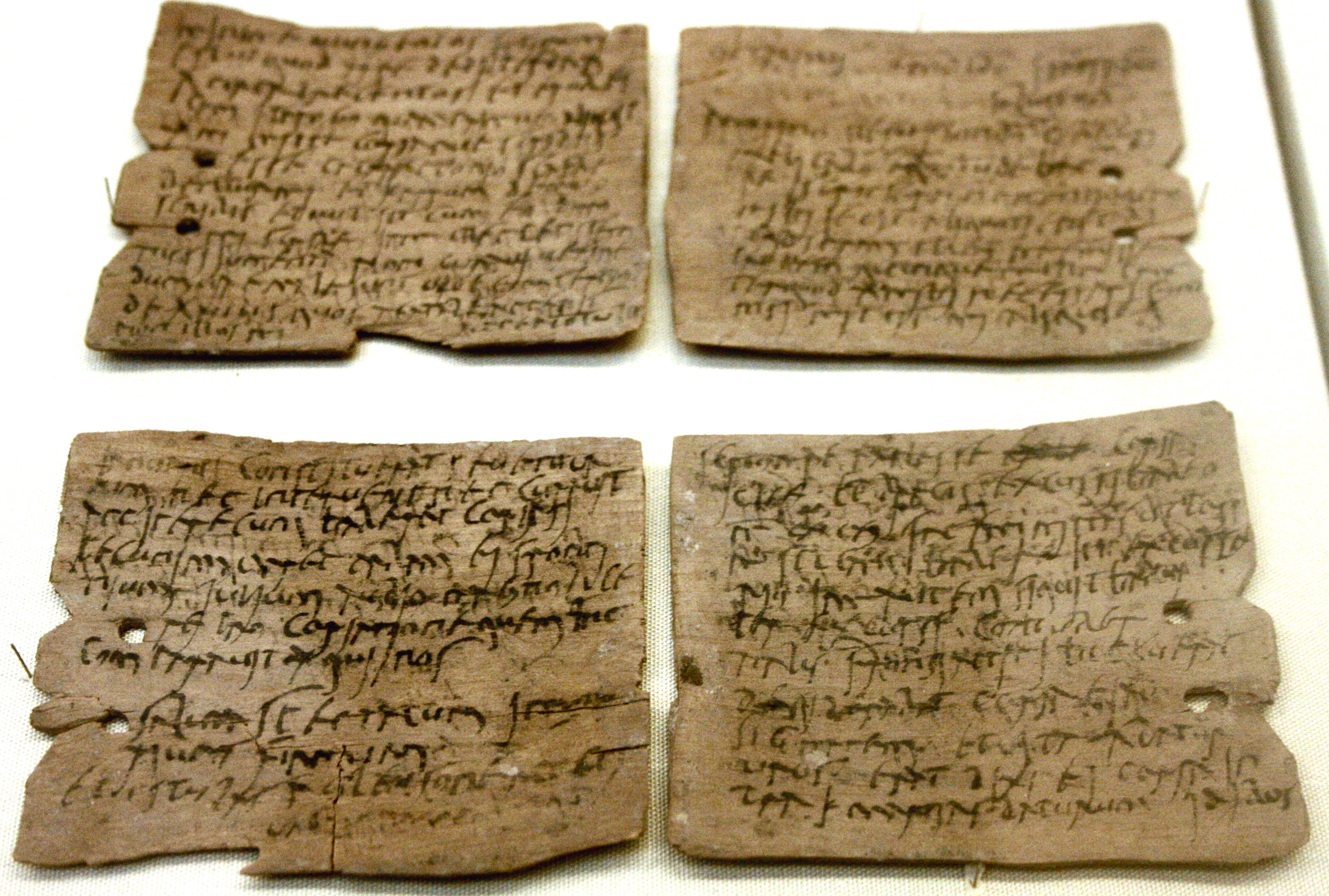
Wooden tablets from Vindolanda

Symbols of ancient Roman monetary units were actively used not only on coins, but also in written sources—for example, on wooden tablets of the 1st–2nd centuries AD, which were found in 1973 during excavations of Vindolanda, a Roman fort in the territory of Roman Britain, and are the oldest group of historical documents in Great Britain. These tablets in most cases consist of wooden spalt with ink records in Latin (analog—Russian birch bark letters) and provide rich material for studying many spheres of the daily life of ancient Romans, including monetary circulation. Their main value lies in the fact that they represent samples primarily of everyday business and personal correspondence, not official documents. These are lists of purchased food (local beer, aged wine, fish sauce, lard), duty rosters (who is plastering walls, who is on duty in the bakery), requests for leave, letters of recommendation, thanks for a sent gift in the form of half a hundred oysters, a report on the whereabouts of 752 soldiers, a mass of bills and receipts for receiving food, clothing, and household utensils In terms of symbols, from the already studied and deciphered material, the following conclusions can be drawn:

- the main weight unit is the libra (written as libr or librae), in the texts of the tablets more often called the pound (written as pondo or 'p);
- the main units of monetary account are denarii, victoriati, dupondii, and asses;
- as a rule, the monetary unit is represented not by the full or abbreviated name, but by its symbol (X or 𐆖 for denarius; I or ~~I~~ for as);
- to indicate monetary amounts, Roman numerals are used, which are placed after the symbol of the corresponding monetary unit, not before it.

After the monetary reform of Aurelian (Roman emperor in 270–275) the minting of denarii in Rome was discontinued and never resumed, however, the term "denarius" was retained for a long time as a unit of account—in particular, the common denarius (Latin: denarius communis), which arose as a result of the monetary reform of Diocletian (Roman emperor in 284–305). It is this monetary unit that is used, for example, to express prices in the Edict on Maximum Prices.

== Influence of ancient Roman symbols on modern currency symbols ==
=== Use of the currency sign before the nominal ===
Today, many currency symbols are written before the numerical expression of the monetary amount. This is primarily characteristic of the symbols of the dollar and pound — respectively, $7.40 ("7 dollars and 40 cents") and £7.40 ("7 pounds and 40 pence"). Curiously, this tradition is gradually spreading even to countries where writing is traditionally based on the Cyrillic script, such as Ukraine and Belarus. In particular, the central banks of these states, in their press releases dedicated to the approval of the graphical symbols of national currencies, officially indicate the possibility of using the signs (respectively ₴ and Br) "both before and after the nominal". The tradition of placing the symbol of the monetary unit before the nominal dates back to Ancient Rome. Thus, the typical form of recording monetary amounts encountered on tablets from Vindolanda, for example in the second line of tablet No. 182, looks as follows — 𐆖Xii, which means "12 denarii".

=== Modern currencies originating from ancient Roman ===
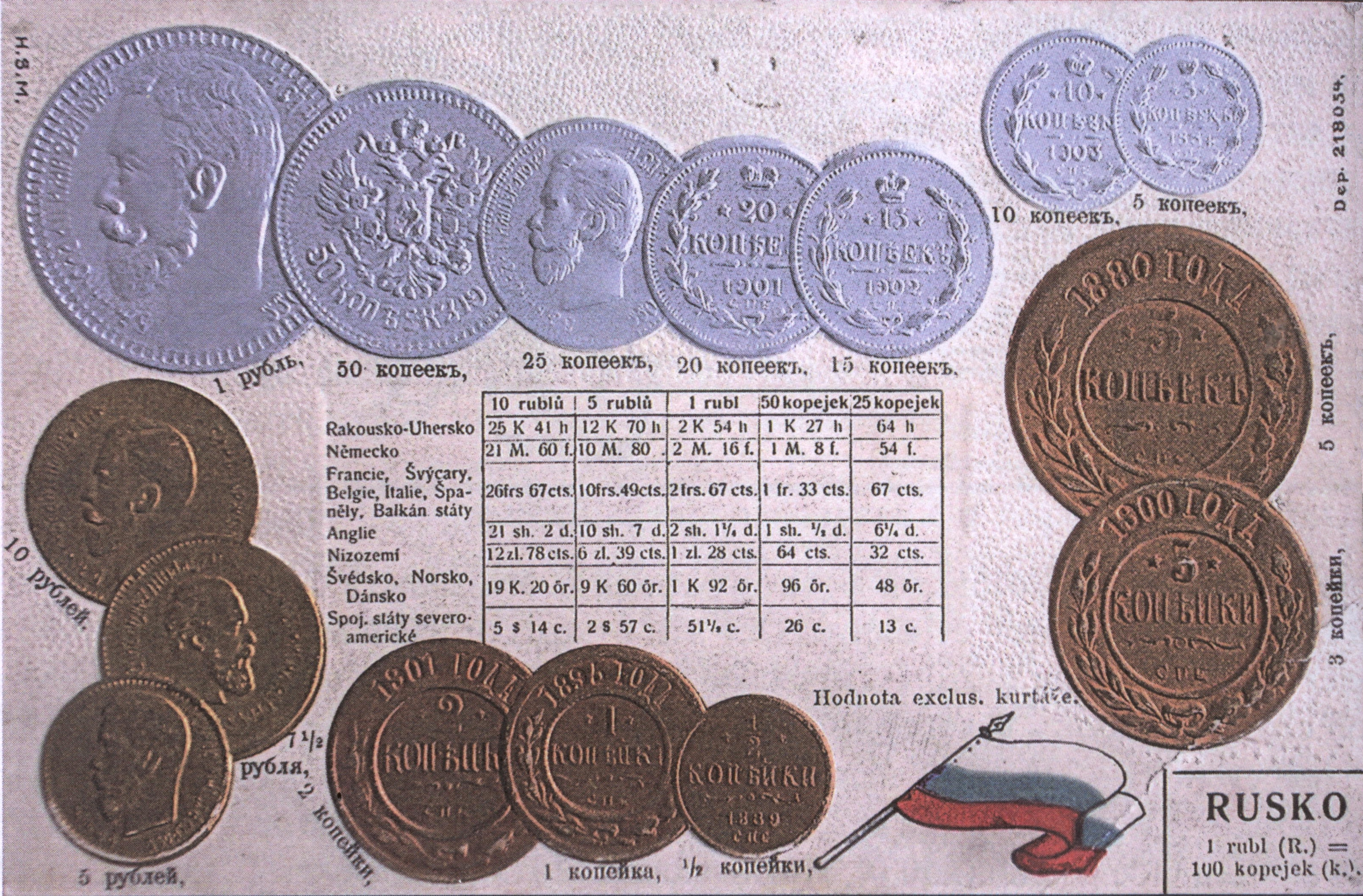
A postcard from the early 20th century with coins of the Russian Empire. It shows abbreviations for a number of European monetary units, including the shilling (sh.), penny (d.), and öre (ör.)

Many monetary and weight units of Ancient Rome exerted significant influence on the formation of the monetary systems of countries in Europe, Asia, and Africa. Primarily, this includes the libra, which retained its significance as a basic unit of weight in Byzantium and medieval European states, as well as the solidus and denarius; to a lesser extent — the num mia, follis, and aureus. The libra gave its name to the French livre, the Italian lira, and also the modern (Turkish lira). The minting of denarii in Rome ceased with the fall of the empire in the 5th century; however, imitations appeared very quickly: the pfennig (Pfennig or Pfenning) in Germany, the penny (penny) in England, the denier (denier) in France, and the pieniądz (pieniądz) in Poland and Lithuania. Modern monetary units whose names derive from the ancient Roman denarius include the Macedonian denar, the dinars of the Algerian, Bahraini, Jordanian, Iraqi, Kuwaiti, Libyan, Serbian, and Tunisian, as well as the exchange Iranian dinar equal to 1/100 of the rial.

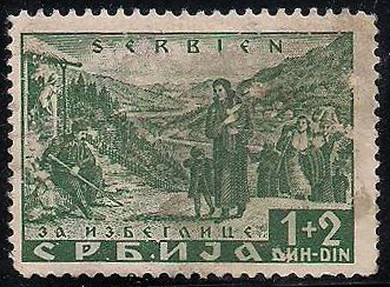
A 1941 stamp with abbreviations of the Serbian dinar in Latin script (din) and Cyrillic script (дин)

Although the solidus (solidus — solid, sturdy, massive) is considered primarily a Byzantine coin, its first issue was produced in 309 CE by the then still Roman emperor Constantine I. For a long time, solidi served as the main gold monetary unit of the Roman Empire, then of Byzantium, and then of the barbarian states of Europe. In France, it gave rise to the name sol (later — sou), in Italy — soldo, in Spain — sueldo. The Germanized name of the solidus is the shilling. Modern "solidi" include the exchange Vietnamese sũ (1/100 of the đồng) and the shillings of the Kenyan, Somali, Tanzanian, and Ugandan. The names of the following modern exchange monetary units also derive from ancient Roman ones:

- luma (1/100 of the Armenian dram) — via Syriac ܠܘܡܐ from the name of the Byzantine coin "nummia" (nummus or νοῦμμος);
- fils (1/100 of the UAE dirham, 1/100 of the Yemeni rial, 1/1000 of the Bahraini, Jordanian, Iraqi, and Kuwaiti dinars), as well as pul (1/100 of the Afghan afghani) — from follis (pouch) via the name of the ancient Roman coin follis;
- eyrir (1/100 of the Icelandic króna) and øre (1/100 of the Danish, Norwegian, and Swedish kronor) — from aurum (gold) via the name of the ancient Roman coin aureus (aureus).

At present, ancient symbols are not used for the brief designation of modern monetary units derived from ancient Roman ones. In most cases, these are abbreviations of modern names in Latin script, Cyrillic script, or Arabic script.

=== £sd system ===
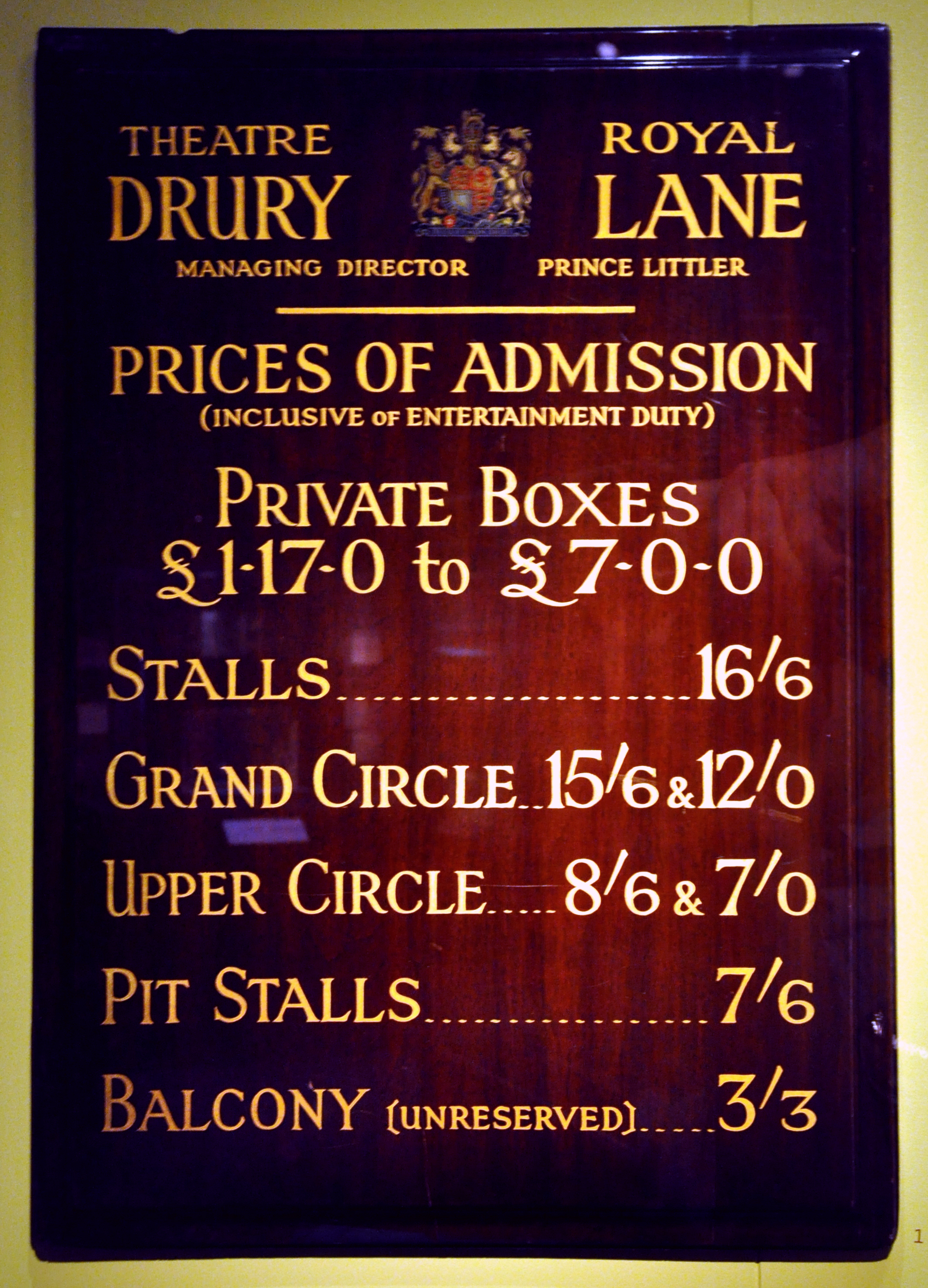
A British theater poster from the 1940s with the pound symbol and prices indicated in pounds, shillings, and pence

Hryvnia symbols and dimidia sextula

Although the modern symbol of the hryvnia (₴) is almost identical to the symbol of the ancient Roman weight unit — dimidia (half) sextula, it is formed from the cursive lowercase Cyrillic letter "g", rather than from the archaic (turned) Latin s. At the same time, the two horizontal strokes of the hryvnia, according to the press release of the National Bank of Ukraine, «embody the idea of the stability of the monetary unit... Such an idea is traditionally used in many currency signs, which distinguishes them from other symbols and pictograms». One horizontal stroke of the ancient Roman weight unit signifies the division in half of the sextula proper.

In 781, under Charlemagne, the Carolingian monetary standard was adopted. In accordance with it, the weight of the libra (pound) was substantially increased — to approximately 408 grams. The libra itself was equated to 20 solidi (shillings) or 240 denarii (1 solidus = 12 denarii). In numismatic literature, this new weight norm received the name "Pound of Charlemagne" or "Carolingian pound". No documents specifying the exact weight of the Carolingian pound have survived, so it was reconstructed based on the weighing of denarii from that period, yielding an approximate result of 408 grams. As a system of measures and weights, the Carolingian system did not become established — by the beginning of the 20th century, there were no fewer than 20 varieties of weight norms for the pound; however, as a monetary system, it persisted in a number of countries until the end of the 20th century. Thus, the monetary system borrowed from Charlemagne — English, and later British — remained almost unchanged until 1971: the pound sterling was divided into 20 shillings and 240 pence. This system is sometimes called l.s.d., £.s.d. or £sd — by the first letters of the names of the corresponding ancient Roman monetary and weight units: libra (libra), solidus (solidus), denarius (denarius), which in Charlemagne's empire and neighboring states became the pound (lira in Italy, livre in France), shilling (soldo in Italy, sol in France, sueldo in Spain), and denarius (pfennig in Germany, penny in England, denier in France). Thus, precisely the first letter in the Latin name of the coin — denarius — became the symbol of the penny and pfennig. In England and English-speaking countries, it was written in ordinary font ('d); in Germany — in Gothic cursive (₰). After 1971 (the time of the introduction in the United Kingdom of the decimal system of monetary reckoning; 1 pound sterling = 100 pence), the new penny began to be designated by the letter p'; the pfennig was taken out of circulation in 2002 after the replacement of the German mark with the euro. The symbol of the shilling is the Latin letter S, with which the word solidus begins; the word shilling (shilling), as a rule, is abbreviated as sh. Finally, from the first letter in the word libra derive the symbols of the lira and pound sterling, which represent the Latin letter L written in cursive with one or two horizontal bars.

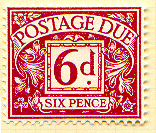
British stamp in 6 pence. The symbol of the penny is the first letter in the word denarius

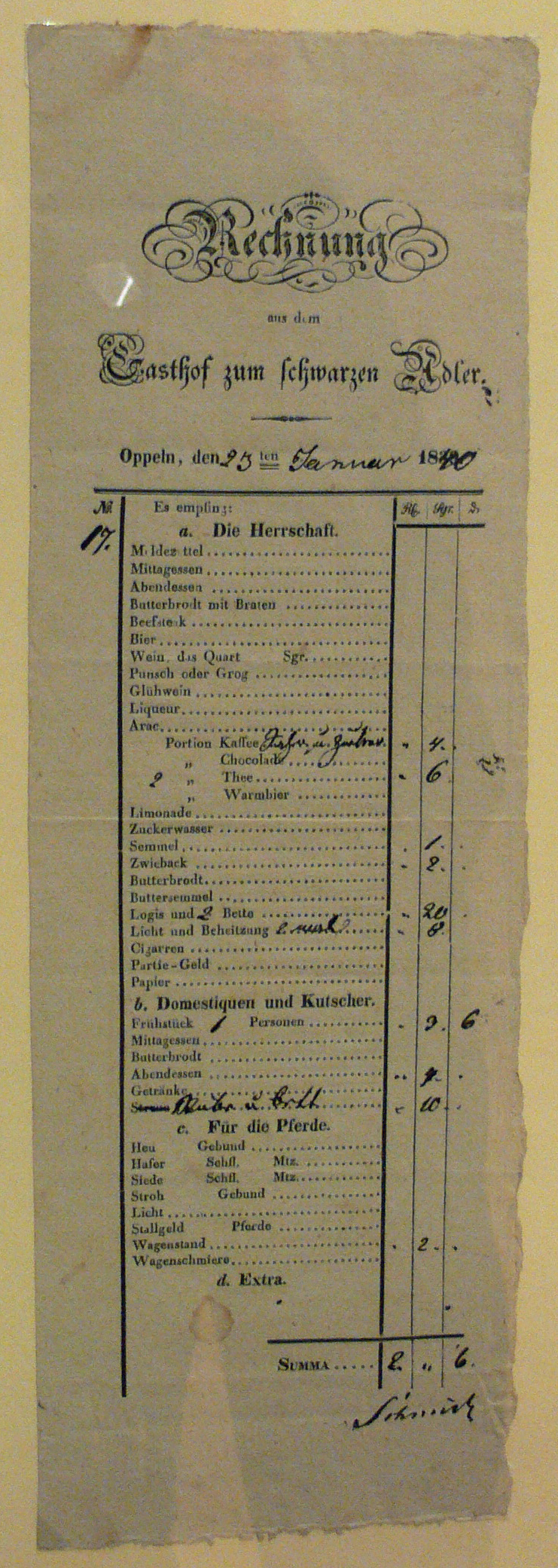
1840 bill with the symbol of the pfennig — the letter d written in Gothic cursive

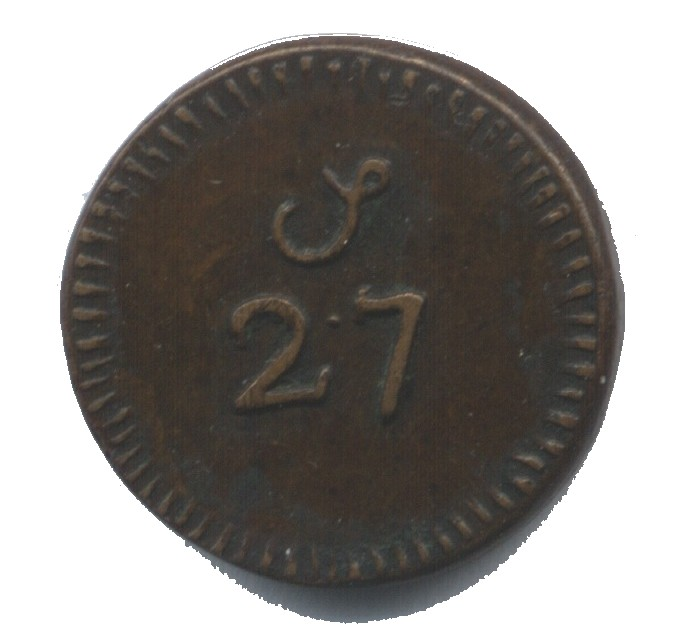
Symbol of the shilling — lowercase letter s — on a moidore

== Bibliography ==
- Aegineta, P. (1847). The seven books of Paulus Aegineta: Translated from the Greek. With a commentary by Francis Adams. London.
- Leake, W. M. (1826). An edict of Diocletian fixing a maximum of prices throughout the Roman empire. A.D. 303. London.
- Pyatygin, A. (2000–2008). "Andrey Pyatygin Ancient Coins". Archived from the original on 2010-10-30.
- "Bank of England Museum". 2011.
- "Britannica — The Online Encyclopedia". Chicago: Encyclopædia Britannica, Inc. 2011.
- Crawford, M. H. (1974). Roman Republican Coinage. Cambridge University Press. ISBN 0-521-07492-4.
- A Dictionary of Roman Coins: Republican and Imperial. London: George Bell and Sons. 1889.
- Dreyfuss, H. (1984). Symbol Sourcebook: An Authoritative Guide to International Graphic Symbols. John Wiley & Sons. ISBN 978-0-471-28872-5.
- "The Free Dictionary". Farlex. 2011.
- Friedlein, G. (1869). Die Zahlzeichen und das elementare Rechnen der Griechen und Römer und des Christlichen Abendlandes. Erlangen: Unknown.
- Menninger, K. (1969). Numbers Words and Number Symbols: A Cultural History of Numbers. Cambridge: The M.I.T. Press. ISBN 0-486-27096-3.
- Perry, D. (2006). "Proposal for Roman Weights and Monetary Signs to UCS" (PDF).
- "Sizes". Sizes, Inc. 1995–2011.
- "Specifications, Tolerances, and Other Technical Requirements for Weighing and Measuring Devices" (NIST Handbook 44 — 2011 ed.). Washington: National Institute of Standards and Technology. 2010.
- Stötzner, A. (2005). "Die Zeichen des Geldes" (PDF). Signa. Beiträge zur Signographie #3. (extended annotation of the edition)
- The Unicode Standard (Version 6.0.0 ed.). Mountain View, CA: The Unicode Consortium. 2011. ISBN 978-1-936213-01-6.
- "Vindolanda Tablets Online". 2011.
- Gramm, M.I. (2000). Занимательная энциклопедия мер, единиц и денег [Entertaining Encyclopedia of Measures, Units, and Money]. Chelyabinsk: Ural LTD. ISBN 5-8029-0098-9.
- Dvoretsky, I.Kh. (2005). Латинско-русский словарь [Latin-Russian Dictionary]. Russky Yazyk — Media.
- Ermolovich, D. I.; Krasavina, T. M. (2004). Новый большой русско-английский словарь (Англо-русский словарь общей лексики «Lingvo Universal») [New Large Russian-English Dictionary (English-Russian Dictionary of General Vocabulary "Lingvo Universal")]. Russky Yazyk — Media.
- Zograf, A.N. (1951). Античные монеты [Ancient Coins]. Materials and Research in the Archaeology of the USSR (Issue 16 ed.). M.—L.: Publishing House of the Academy of Sciences of the USSR.
- "Курсы валют: Украинская гривна" [Currency Rates: Ukrainian Hryvnia]. Valuta-Ukraina.info. 2011.
- Mattingly, H. (2005). Монеты Рима. С древнейших времен до падения Западной Империи [Coins of Rome. From Ancient Times to the Fall of the Western Empire]. Moscow: Collector's Books. ISBN 1-932525-37-8.
- "Монетное дело Средневековья" [Medieval Coinage]. 2009. Archived from the original on 2011-09-04.
- "Пресс-релизы" [Press Releases]. National Bank of the Republic of Belarus. 2000–2011.
- Рим: Эхо имперской славы [Rome: Echo of Imperial Glory]. Encyclopedia "Lost Civilizations". Moscow: Terra. 1997. ISBN 5-300-01183-5.
- "Словарь нумизмата. Описание монет" [Numismatics Dictionary. Coin Descriptions]. 2006–2010.
- Loskutova, E. E. (2008). Управление и экономика фармации [Management and Economics of Pharmacy]. Vol. 1 (2nd ed., rev. and exp. ed.). Moscow: Akademiya. ISBN 978-5-7695-4715-7.
- "Электронный архив Пресс-службы Национального банка Украины" [Electronic Archive of the Press Service of the National Bank of Ukraine]. National Bank of Ukraine. 2005. Archived from the original on 16 February 2007.
- Brockhaus; Efron (1890). Энциклопедический словарь Брокгауза и Ефрона [Encyclopedic Dictionary of Brockhaus and Efron]. St. Petersburg: Semyonovskaya Typolithography (I. A. Efron).

== Additional illustrations ==
=== Catalogs and collections of ancient coins ===
- "Ahala's photostream on Flickr.com". Archived from the original on 2012-01-23.
- Cohen, H. (1857). Description générale des monnaies de la République romaine, communément appelées médailles consulaires (General description of the coins of the Roman Republic, commonly called consular medals) (in French). Paris: Unknown.
- "Roman Coin Database". Archived from the original on 2012-01-23.
- "Roman Numismatic Gallery: Roman Coins, Sculpture, Military Equipment". Archived from the original on 2012-01-23.
- "Illustrated numismatic dictionary on the Andrey Pyatygin Ancient Coins website" (in Russian). Archived from the original on 2012-02-10.

=== Catalogs of symbols (including those not included in the article) ===
- Friedlein, G. (1869). Die Zahlzeichen und das elementare Rechnen der Griechen und Römer und des Christlichen Abendlandes (The number signs and the elementary arithmetic of the Greeks and Romans and of Christian Western Europe) (in German). Erlangen: Unknown.; see the Plate section
- Stötzner, A. (2005). Die Zeichen des Geldes (The Signs of Money) (in German). Signa. Beiträge zur Signographie #3.; see the extended annotation of the edition
