= Roman Republican currency =

Roman currency

Roman Republican currency is the coinage struck by the various magistrates of the Roman Republic, to be used as legal tender. In modern times, the abbreviation RRC, "Roman Republican Coinage" originally the name of a reference work on the topic by Michael H. Crawford, has come to be used as an identifying tag for coins assigned a number in that work, such as RRC 367.

Coins came late to the Republic compared with the rest of the Mediterranean, especially Greece and Asia Minor where coins were invented in the 7th century BC. The currency of central Italy was influenced by its natural resources, with bronze being abundant (the Etruscans were famous metal workers in bronze and iron) and silver ore being scarce. The coinage of the Roman Republic started with a few silver coins apparently devised for trade with the Greek colonies in Southern Italy, and heavy cast bronze pieces for use in Central Italy.

During the Second Punic War a flexible system of coins in bronze, silver and (occasionally) gold was created. This system was dominated by the silver denarius, a denomination which remained in circulation for 450 years. The coins of the republic (especially the denarii) are of particular interest because they were produced by "mint magistrates", junior officials who chose the designs and legends. This resulted in the production of coins advertising the officials' families for political purposes; most of the messages on these coins can still be understood today.

== Before coinage ==
Before the introduction of coinage in Italy the two important forms of value in the economy were sheep (pecus), from which the Latin word for money (pecunia) is believed by some to have been derived, and irregularly shaped pieces of bronze known as aes rude (rough bronze) which needed to be weighed for each transaction. It is unclear when money became commonly used, but Roman tradition recorded that pay of the army began during the siege of Veii in 406 BC and it appears that Aes rude was the currency well before this. Toward the end of the 4th century BC bronze began to be cast in flat bars which are known today, without any historical authority, as aes signatum (signed bronze). These bars were heavily leaded, of varying weights although generally on the order of five Roman pounds, and usually had a design on one and later both sides. The actual function of aes signatum has been variously interpreted; although a form of currency they were not coins since they did not adhere to a weight standard. Rome produced its own aes signatum around 300 BC which are distinguished by the inscription "ROMANOM" (of the Romans) and production continued to about the end of the first Punic war in 240 BC, overlapping some of the developments described below.

== Cast bronze coinage ==
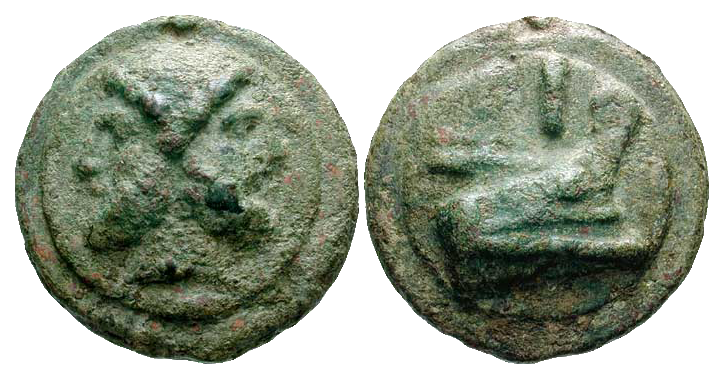

First side of the image: O: Bearded head of Janus, I horizontally below; on a raised disk.
Second side of the image: R: Prow of galley right; I above; all on a raised disk.
Anonymous Æ Aes Grave As (259.53 g). c. 225–217 BC. RRC 35/1; Vecchi 75

According to Pomponius, a lawyer who lived during the 2nd century AD, the group of three mint magistrates tresviri monetales was established in 289 BC, but this date seems to be far too early. If they did not come into existence during the Second Punic War, the formation of a formal college may not have occurred until some time after 200 BC. The three members of this committee were officially known as the "tres viri aere argento auro flando feriundo" ("the three men responsible for casting and striking bronze, silver and gold"), a lengthy title that was almost always abbreviated to "III.V.A.A.A.F.F.". Julius Caesar briefly raised their number to four.

According to Suidas, the mint was located in (or at least near) the temple of Juno Moneta on the Capitoline Hill. By this time Rome was familiar with coinage, as it had been introduced to Italy in the Greek colonies of Metapontum, Croton, and Sybaris before 500 BC and Neapolis c. 450 BC. Rome had conquered a large portion of central Italy, giving it large quantities of bronze, but little silver.

A system of heavy cast leaded bronze coinage was introduced; these issues are known as aes grave (heavy bronze) by numismatists. Stylistically the coins were distinctly Roman and, due to both their size and their being cast rather than struck, crude compared to the coinage elsewhere around the Mediterranean at the time. The standard coin was the as; the word as referred to a coin and also to a unit of weight—in fact, as could also mean any "unit", from measures of length and weight to just the number one.

The bronze coinage was initially a more or less full value currency rather than a token currency, based on the "libral standard" where the as weighed one Roman pound (libra) with fractions in units of Roman ounces (unciae), with 12 unciae in a libra. The "uncia" was thus also both a weight and a coin of the same weight. This changed when the weight of the aes grave was decreased to approximately 10 unciae c. 270 BC (the "light libral standard", remaining at that level until 225 BC, then suddenly to 5 unciae (the "semi-libral standard") around the start of the second Punic war in 218 BC, finally falling to 1.5–1 unciae around 211 BC.

In addition to the as and its fractions, multiples of the as were also produced. Fractions were much more common than asses and their multiples during the period of aes grave. By the time of the semi-libral standard, the smaller denominations such as the uncia and semuncia were struck rather than cast. A variety of less common denominations were minted over time; those found in Crawford (1974) are listed here.

Bronze Denominations in Crawford (1974)
Obverse	Reverse	Name	Mark	Earliest Example	Date	Value (Asses)	Value (Unciae)
		Decussis	X	RRC 41/1	215–212 BC	10	120
		Quincussis	V	RRC 41/2	215–212 BC	5	60
		Tressis	III	RRC 41/3	215–212 BC	3	36
		Dupondius	II	RRC 41/4	215–212 BC	2	24
		As	I	RRC 14/1	280–276 BC	1	12
		Dextans	S𐆐𐆐	RRC 97/23	211–208 BC	5/6	10
		Dodrans	S𐆐𐆑	RRC 266/2	126 BC	3/4	9
		Bes	S𐆐	RRC 266/3	126 BC	2/3	8
		Semis	S	RRC 14/2	280–276 BC	1/2	6
		Quincunx	𐆐𐆐𐆑	RRC 97/11	211–208 BC	5/12	5
		Triens	𐆐𐆐	RRC 14/3	280–276 BC	1/3	4
		Quadrans	𐆐𐆑	RRC 14/4	280–276 BC	1/4	3
		Sextans	𐆐	RRC 14/5	280–276 BC	1/6	2
		Uncia	𐆑	RRC 14/6	280–276 BC	1/12	1
		Semuncia	𐆒	RRC 14/7	280–276 BC	1/24	1/2
		Quartuncia	𐅀	RRC 38/8	217–215 BC	1/48	1/4

== Introduction of Greek-style silver coinage ==
Greek-style struck bronze coins were produced in small quantity with the inscription ΡΩΜΑΙΩΝ around 300 BC; only a handful of examples exist today. They are believed to have been produced on behalf of Rome by Neapolis, based on the similar style and weight with Neapolis' own coinage, and used to facilitate trade in the wake of the construction of the Appian Way, started in 312 BC.

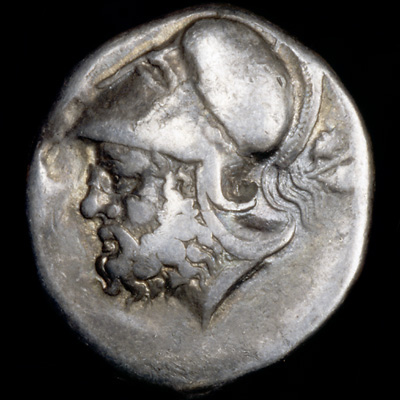
O: Bearded head of Mars with Corinthian helmet left.

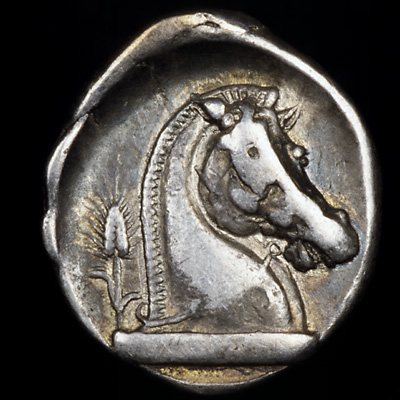
R: Horse head right, grain ear behind.

The first Roman silver coin, 281 BC. RRC 13/1

Rome entered into a war against Tarentum in 281 BC; the Tarentines enlisted the support of Pyrrhus of Epirus. It was in this context that Rome produced its first Greek-style silver didrachm (RRC 13/1) with the head of Mars wearing a Corinthian helmet on one side and the head of a horse with the inscription ROMANO (worn off on the example shown) and a grain ear behind. This coinage may have predated the aes grave discussed above, but was minted and used largely in Magna Graecia and Campania. It was clearly part of a broader trend; payment of Roman and allied troops fighting in the Pyrrhic war appears to have been crucial in spreading the use of Greek-style coinage throughout the southern Apennine areas of Italy. This issue is today thought to have been minted in Neapolis because it was minted on that weight standard (7.3 g), not that of Metapontum, Tarentum, and other South Italian cities (which was 7.9 g at the start of the war but fell to 6.6 g during its course). This issue was thought earlier to have been minted in Metapontum because the grain-ear is the most common type on Metapontine coins and the Mars head is very similar to the head of Leucippus (a local hero, the Messenian king who re-founded Metapontum, not the philosopher) on an earlier coin produced there.

O: Diademed head Hercules right, club on shoulder.

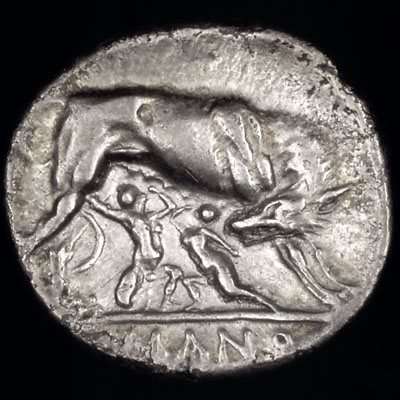
R: Wolf suckling twins, ROMANO in. ex.

The first Roman silver coin minted at Rome, 269 BC. RRC 20/1

A number of different coins were minted in increasing volumes over the next few years, but the first silver coin now thought to have been minted in Rome itself is the Hercules/She-wolf didrachm (Crawford 20/1). The date of this issue is likely 269 BC, as the devices on this coin refer to that year's consuls Q. Ogulnius L.f A.n. Gallus and C. Fabius C.f. M.n. Pictor. Hercules, shown on the obverse his club (shown undersized above his shoulder) and a lion skin tied around his neck, was the divine patron of the Fabii. Quintus and his brother Cnaeus Ogulnius had, as curule aediles, prosecuted moneylenders; part of the proceeds were used to set up near the Ficus Ruminalis a statue of Romulus and Remus being suckled by the she-wolf as shown on the reverse. Some historians believe that these coins were valued at 10 asses making them denarii, this assertion is based on the account of Pliny in the 1st century AD, where he states that the denarius was introduced in 269 BC. Most historians today, however, do not see this as a denarius, but another didrachm.

This last and most other Roman coins were produced in small numbers until the introduction of the didrachm we refer to as the quadrigatus. The quadrigatus, produced in large quantity starting around 235 BC, was named after the reverse image of Victory driving a quadriga and was produced for about 2 decades, becoming more and more debased (to as little as 30% silver) during the Second Punic War.

== The denarius system ==
=== As introduced ===
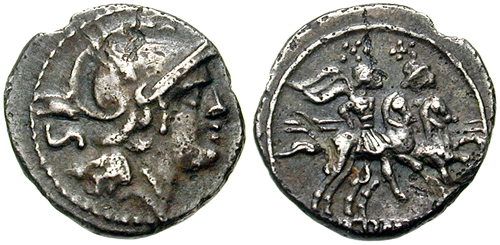

First side of the image: O: Head Roma Right. IIS
Second side of the image: R: Caped Dioscuri riding right with couched lances, stars above.
Sestertius, Anonymous, Rome, 211 BC. RRC 44/7

The denarius, which became the main silver coin of Rome for over four centuries, was introduced in 211 BC or a few years earlier, and produced in enormous quantity from the silver captured in the sack of Syracuse. The denarius (RRC 44/5), valued at 10 asses as indicated by the mark X and weighing about 4.5 grams (72 to a Roman pound), was introduced as part of a complex multi-metallic coinage. Also in silver was the half denarius, the quinarius (RRC 44/6, marked V), and the quarter denarius, the sestertius (RRC 44/7, marked IIS and shown on the left), all bearing a head of Roma on the obverse and a reverse of the dioscuri riding with their capes behind (a reference to their supposed assistance to Rome at the battle of Lake Regillus).

Bronze asses and their fractions (all now struck rather than cast) continued to be produced to a standard of about 55 grams; this was very quickly reduced to a sextantal standard and finally an uncial standard of roughly 32 gms. By this time, asses outnumbered their fractions, perhaps because legionary pay was increased to the point where the as could become the principal component.

In gold, there were three pieces worth 60 asses (RRC 44/2, marked ↆX), 40 asses (RRC 44/3, marked XXXX) and 20 asses (RRC 44/4, marked XX). All featured a head of Mars on the obverse and an eagle with outspread wings standing on a thunderbolt on the reverse. The eagle is somewhat reminiscent of the eagle that had consistently been a symbol on Ptolemaic coinage since the very beginning of the century, and it has been suggested that Ptolemy IV Philopator may have provided gold for this issue to act as a counterweight to the involvement of Philip V of Macedon on the side of Carthage.

The victoriatus, another silver coin (RRC 44/1), was also introduced in large quantity at the same time. It seems to have been quite separate from the denarius system proper as X-ray fluorescence spectrometry has shown that these were produced to an entirely different standard of fineness. While an analysis of 52 early denarii, quinarii, and sestertii showed a silver concentration of 96.2 ± 1.09%, 19 victoriati from the same period have highly variable fineness ranging from 72 to 93%. Early finds of victoriati are primarily in Southern Italy and Sicily and it is thought that the victoriati with a weight of 3/4 of a denarius were used to pay non-citizens with experience of the Greek coinage system in the drachma format to which they were accustomed, but with debased/overvalued coins. The quadrigatus didrachm, which had been retariffed to 15 asses (1.5 denarii), was removed from circulation almost immediately.

Recent work has examined the circulation of Roman Republican coinage using georeferenced evidence from coin hoards. One study analysed Republican hoards dated to 155 BCE–2 CE through spatial interaction modelling and social accounting methods, showing that patterns of coin circulation were related to settlement hierarchies, transport routes, and urban infrastructure. The study also found that the effect of distance on circulation declined over time, a pattern linked to the expansion of infrastructure, administrative integration, and the standardisation of the monetary system after the adoption of the denarius.

=== Evolution: weights and fineness ===
Over the next 40 years, the denarius slowly lost weight. The reason for this is unclear, but in the early days it may have been the ongoing pressure of the Second Punic War. Afterwards the Roman state had a debt equivalent to 25 years direct taxation on Roman citizens (~1 million denarii); this was not fully repaid until Cn. Manlius Vulso returned with the spoils of Asia after the Treaty of Apamea, (188 BC). The weight was officially changed from 72 to the pound (6 scruples) to 84 to the pound at that time; it remained relatively stable thereafter.

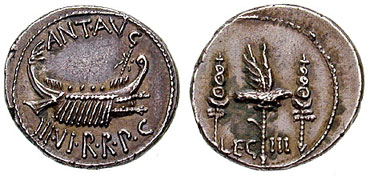

First side of the image: O: ANT AVG III VI R R P C, dromon galley facing right.
Second side of the image: R: LEG III, aquila and two legionary standards.
Legionary denarius of Mark Anthony, 32 BC. RRC 544/15

Date	Weight
211 BC	4.5 g
206 BC	4.2 g
199–190 BC	3.9 g
179–170 BC	3.7 g

The silver content during republican times remained well above 90%, usually above 95% with the exception of Marcus Antonius's later coinage, especially the massive issue of Legionary denarii of 32–31 BC just prior to the Battle of Actium (an example is shown on the right), rumored to be silver from Egypt provided by Cleopatra.

=== Evolution: silver vs bronze ===
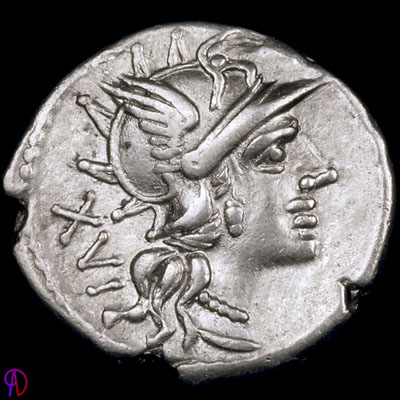
Obverse, RRC 224/1, 141 BC.

Obverse, RRC 243/1, 134 BC.

Two denarius obverses showing alternate indications they were worth 16 asses.

By about 140 BC (the exact date is unclear) the denarius was retariffed to 16 asses, indicated by XVI on the obverse of the denarius. This appears first on the coinage marked L.IVLI (RRC 224/1), commonly dated to 141 BC. The clear marking with the number XVI was soon again replaced with an X, but often now with a horizontal bar through the centre as shown in the second example on the left (RRC 243/1); this is sometimes read as a monogram of XVI with all the letters superimposed. The re-tariffing is thought to have been a recognition of a relationship that had developed because of decreased as weights, both due to wear of old asses and to decreasing mint weights of newer ones. This meant that the quinarius was worth eight asses, and the sestertius four asses. The new denarius-to-as ratio lasted for hundreds of years. At about the same time the unit of account changed from asses to sestertii (HS). This may well be an indicator of inflation.

The victoriatus continued to circulate well into the 2nd century BC. Victoriati were later popular in places such as Cisalpine Gaul where they circulated alongside drachmae of Massalia (Marseille).

=== Evolution: gold ===
The gold 60, 40, and 20 as coins were only minted for a few years; gold in general appears to have been used at first only as an emergency coinage. Gold coins reappeared in 82 BC when Sulla was gathering funds for the war against Mithridates VI of Pontus immediately after the financial strains of the Social War. Sulla's coinage is commonly considered the first for which the name (denarius) aureus was used. Aureii were minted in large numbers by Julius Caesar in preparation for a proposed war against Parthia and issuing of the aureus continued to increase after the fall of the republic.

== Coinage and political messages ==
New denarius reverse design: Luna driving a biga, 169–158 BC. RRC 187/1

Eventually a new reverse appeared, first Luna driving a biga (two horse chariot) in 194–190 BC, and then Victory driving a biga in 157 BC – thought to refer to the final defeat of Perseus of Macedon at the battle of Pydna by Lucius Aemilius Paulus in 168 BC. These Victory "bigati" became the most common type of denarius. Denarii were marked with special symbols (such as a star or an anchor) from very shortly after their introduction and soon monograms indicating the tresviri monetales (mint masters, often called moneyers, that were responsible for the issue) were on the coins. In some cases the symbols are "punning". The example reverse shown to the left (RRC 187/1 showing Luna driving a biga) is one such; a shell symbol appears above the horses along with the letters "PVR" below. The shell is thought to be a murex shell; this was the source of Tyrian purple (in Latin: purpureo) and this, along with the letters, is thought to refer to a Furius Purpureo. This type of reference to the moneyers became more and more explicit, and eventually developed into self-advertising to further the political career of the moneyers.

Denarius reverse celebrating ancestor of N. Fabius Pictor, RRC 268/1b

Families who had already had members in the Senate were more likely to have further family members elected to political office (and thus become senators). This was so much more likely that only a few consular novi homines (new men) are known to history. Advertising on coins was thus often about the moneyer's family. In the coin reverse shown on the right (RRC 268/1b), the legend around the outside indicates that moneyer was N. Fabius Pictor. The seated individual is wearing a cuirass, holding a spear in his left hand and an apex, the characteristic hat worn by the flamines, in his right. At his side there is a shield inscribed QUIRIN. This is taken to refer to Q. Fabius Pictor (probably the son of Quintus Fabius Pictor the annalist) who was elected praetor in 189 BC and assigned the province of Sardinia by lot (Livy 37.50.8). He was also the flamen Quirinalis and because of this, P. Licinius Crassus, the pontifex maximus of the day did not allow him to take the Sardinian office because of various taboos surrounding the flamen's person, and the need for the flamen to perform certain rites in Rome (Livy 37.51.3–7). The Sardinian praetorship was exchanged for both the urban and peregrine praetorships, and N. Fabius Pictor remained in Rome. The entire incident was part of the political manoeuvring of Scipio Africanus against his attackers, which included the Fabii.

First side of the image: O: Head Lucius Junius Brutus right, BRVTVS.
Second side of the image: R: Head Gaius Servilius Ahala right, AHALA.
Denarius of Marcus Junius Brutus celebrating his ancestors, 54 BC. RRC 433/2

Over time, the politics of the day became more and more visible in the coinage. In 54 BC, the First Triumvirate had control of Rome, and Pompey was its preeminent member. There were rumours that Pompey was to be made dictator. In this context, the coin on the left (Crawford 433/2) was a powerful political message. The moneyer, Marcus Junius Brutus, placed on the coin two figures from Roman history that he claimed as ancestors:

  - Lucius Junius Brutus of the Junia gens, who was made the first consul of the republic of Rome in 509 BC after he expelled Lucius Tarquinius Superbus, the last of the Roman kings, and
  - Gaius Servilius Ahala, who killed Spurius Maelius – a knight who endeared himself to the populace of Rome by providing free grain during a famine – reputedly in a bid for seeking kingship – in 439 BC. Marcus Brutus was also known as Quintus Servilius Caepio Brutus, as he had been adopted into the gens Servilia, from which he was descended on his mother's side.

In the face of famine in 57 BC Pompey had been made a special commissioner to control the supply of grain; this included the control of all ports and trading centres for five years. There was earlier bad blood between them; Pompey had put down an earlier insurrection by Marcus Aemilius Lepidus in which Brutus's father had been involved; Pompey had had him executed. It was the opposition of Cato the Younger, Brutus's half-brother on his adopted family's side, to Pompey's requests for land for his veterans of the war against Mithradates that gave Pompey the incentive to be part of the triumvirate. M. Brutus was clearly making a pointed, uncompromising statement of opposition to Pompey and the triumvirate while praising his ancestors.

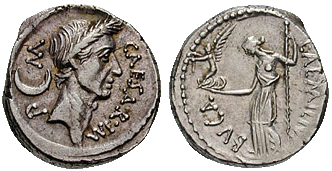

First side of the image: O: Head Caesar right, CAESAR. IM P M
Second side of the image: R: Venus standing holding Victory in right hand and sceptre in left. L. AEMILIVS BVC.
Denarius minted in the name of Caesar by L. Aemilius Buca 44 BC. RRC 480/4

In 44 BC, Julius Caesar was preparing for war with Parthia to avenge the defeat inflicted by the Parthians on Crassus at the Battle of Carrhae. To this end, an enormous variety of denarii and aureii were being minted in large numbers. The coin on the right is from January–February 44 BC. The Venus holding Victory and a sceptre on the reverse was a reference to the claim of the gens Julia to descend from Aeneas and thus Anchises and the goddess Venus. This was innocuous to Romans, but the obverse showing Caesar himself wearing the gold laurel wreath that the Senate had voted for him was an enormous departure from tradition and deeply offensive. While the coinage had been used to show ancestors, this is the first time that the head of a living Roman had been displayed on Roman coinage. It was widely perceived as part of a larger series of moves by Caesar to make himself king – and kings were anathema in Rome ever since the foundation of the republic. Other coins minted at the same time bore the text "DICT QVART", indicating that Caesar had been dictator for four years running. A later version (RRC 480/10, February–March 44 BC) showed "DICT PERPET"; Caesar had been made dictator for life. He was assassinated, by Brutus among others, on the Ides of March, 44 BC.

Head Brutus Right. BRVT IMP, L.PLAET.CEST

Two daggers flanking pileus. EID.MAR

Modern forgery of denarius of L. Plaetorius Cestianus celebrating Brutus and his action on the Ides of March. 43–42 BC. RRC 508/3

The assassination could not revive the republic. Two years later, just prior to the Battle of Philippi, Brutus produced a coin (RRC 508/3, modern forgery shown to the left) celebrating the freeing of the republic from Caesar's tyranny. The reverse showed two daggers flanking a pileus (a cap used in the ceremony freeing slaves) and the legend "EID MAR" (Eidibus Martiis - on the Ides of March). On the obverse, Brutus, the "noblest Roman", had placed his own head. The republic survived, by convention more than reality, until Octavian, Caesar's nephew and heir was declared Augustus in 27 BC.

== Sources of evidence ==
The dates on all the coins mentioned above can not be known with absolute certainty. Sometimes particular coins can be linked to a well defined event in history, e.g. the "dict perpet" denarii of Caesar can be dated very closely to his assassination, but this is rarely the case. Much dating of the coinage is based on evidence from coin hoards. The hoarding of coins, especially by burial, was a "banking system" often used in ancient times, particularly in times of crisis; hoarding during the civil war between Caesar and Pompey was so extensive that it resulted in a liquidity crisis. Hoards can present evidence in several ways:

- The location of the hoard can speak to where the coins in question circulated.
- The archaeological context of a coin hoard can set an approximate date for the production of the coinage. As an example, excavations of the Temple of Artemis in Ephesus uncovered coins beneath the temple; the date the temple was built is known and so a terminus ante quem for the period of their production can be deduced.
- The differential wear of coins in a hoard can be used to establish a relative chronology. Coins that had circulated longer prior to burial should show more wear.
- The composition of the hoard in terms of coin types can speak to what sorts of coins circulated in the same place at the same time and their relative abundance. From this, relative chronologies can sometimes be extracted.
- Comparison of multiple coin hoards can help to establish relative chronologies; if a series of coins is well represented in one large coin hoard and some are missing from a second large hoard, it is likely that they were minted after that hoard was buried.

Despite all of this, the evidence remains unclear. In this case, numismatic scholars attempt to make their best estimate of the absolute and relative chronology. In English, the current standard work is Crawford 1974 which built on and superseded the work of Sydenham 1952, Grueber 1910, Babelon 1886, and Mommsen 1850. The chronology used by this article and the identification of coins by the label RRC xx/yy identifies a particular item in that catalogue. There is however newer evidence, particularly in the period 170–149 BC, where analysis of the recently discovered Mesagne hoard has led to the alternate chronologies of Hersh & Walker 1984, and Harlan 1995. An alternate naming of the coinage of the form "gens ##" (e.g. "Fabia 11" for the 11th coin minted by a moneyer of the gens Fabia; i.e. RRC 268/1) is also sometimes still used. This was devised by Babelon and used by Grueber, Sydenham, and many newer books.

== See also ==
- List of historical currencies
- Roman currency
- Roman provincial currency
- List of Roman moneyers during the Republic
- Banker's mark
