= Triens =

Roman bronze coin

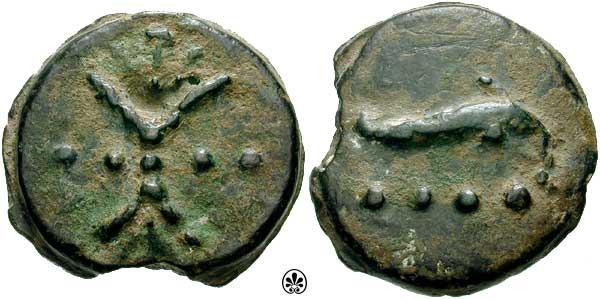
Rome. Circa 241-235 BC. Æ Aes grave Triens (107.00 g)

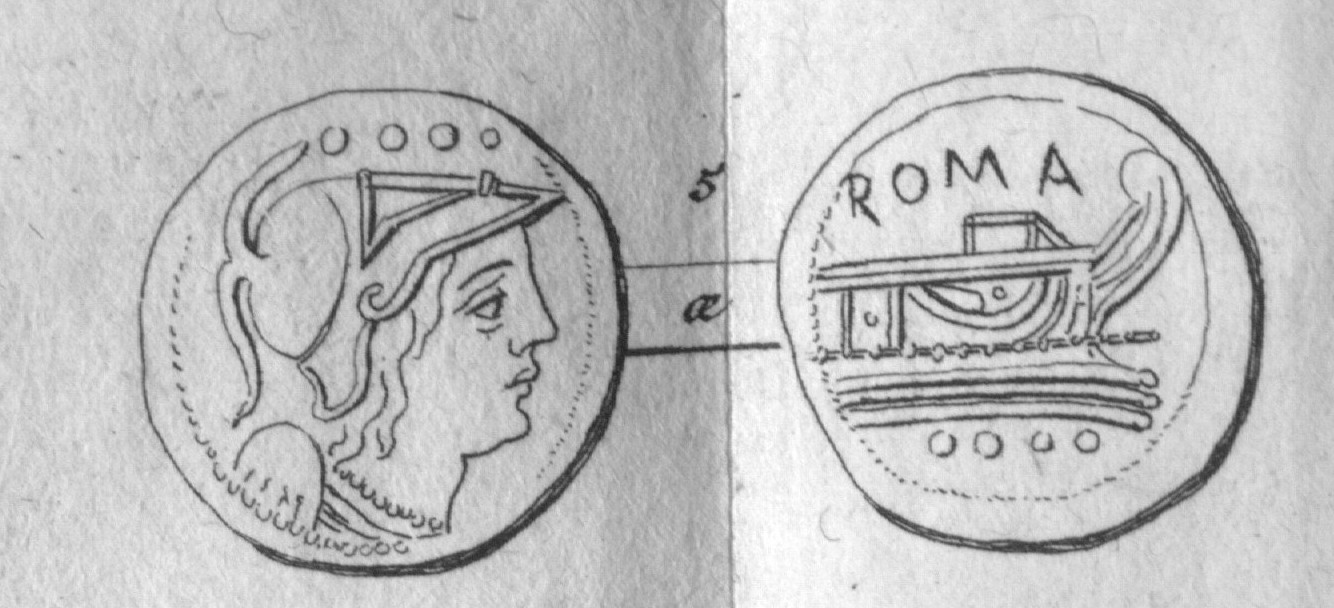
Triens: O/ Minerva, four pellets above; R/ prow of a galley left, four pellets below

The triens (pl. trientes) was an ancient Roman bronze coin produced during the Roman Republic valued at one-third of an as (4 unciae). While earlier cast specimens date as far back as the emergence of the Aes Grave around 280 BC, a new, lighter triens was first struck as part of a family of fractional bronze coins including semis, quadrans, sextans and uncia with the introduction of the Denarian System of Roman currency around 211 BC. The most common design for the triens featured the bust of Minerva and four pellets (indicating four unciae) on the obverse and the prow of a galley on the reverse. Minting of new Roman republican bronzes, including the triens, slowed throughout the second and first centuries BC, ceasing altogether by the late 80's BC.

Later, in Frankish Gaul, the term "triens" was often used for the tremissis, since both terms meant "a third".

== See also ==
- Roman currency
