= Aes =

Family of ancient Roman coins

Aes is the Latin word for bronze, also used to designate the early forms of Roman Republican currency. The word was later standardized as As, low-value coins that were produced until the reign of Emperor Diocletian, who ruled from 284 to 305 AD.
