= Aes grave =

Term in numismatics

Aes grave ("heavy bronze") is a term in numismatics indicating bronze cast coins used in central Italy during the 3rd century BC, whose value was generally indicated by signs: I for the as, S for semis ("half") and pellets for unciae ("twelfths"). Standard weights for the as were 272, 327, or 341 grams, depending upon the issuing authority.

The main Roman cast coins had these marks and images:

Image	value	mark
Ianus	As	I
Iupiter	Semis	S
Minerva	Triens	four pellets
Hercules	Quadrans	three pellets
Mercury	Sextans	two pellets
Bellona or Roma	Uncia	one pellet

== Issuing cities ==
Main series were from Rome, Ariminum (Rimini), Iguvium (Gubbio), Tuder (Todi), Ausculum (Ascoli Satriano), Firmum (Fermo), Hatria - Hadria (Atri), Luceria (Lucera), and Latin central Italy. Other series have unknown provenance.

== Gallery ==
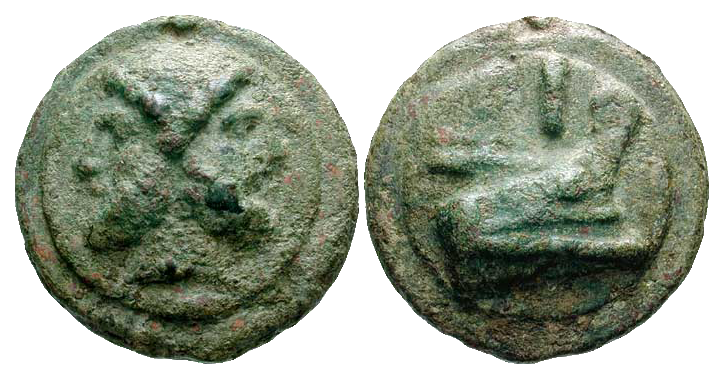
As (c. 235 BC)

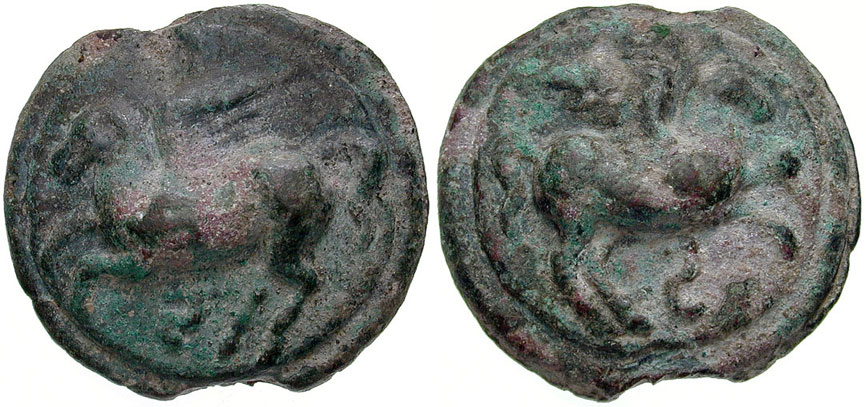
Semis

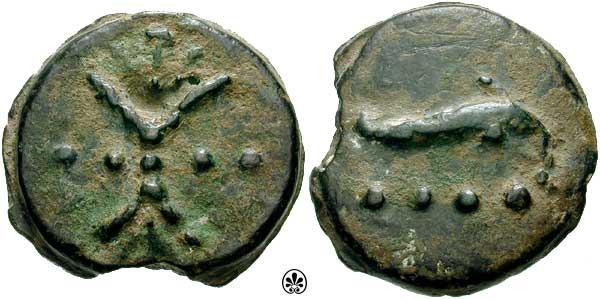
Triens (c. 241–235 BC)

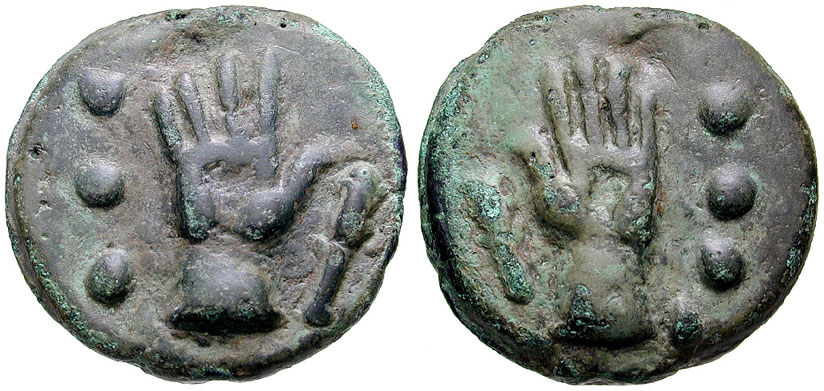
Quadrans (c. 230–226 BC. weight 63.19 g
Vecchi 61; Crawford 27/8)

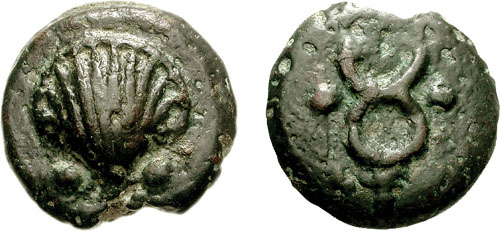
Sextans (c. 289–245 BC)

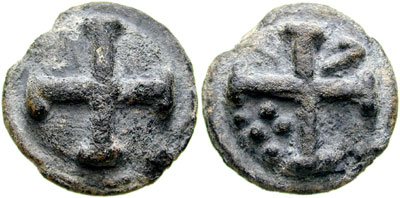
Quincunx (coin) (after 220 BC)

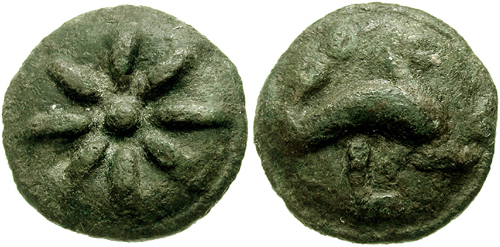
Teruncius (Apulia, Luceria. c. 220 BC)

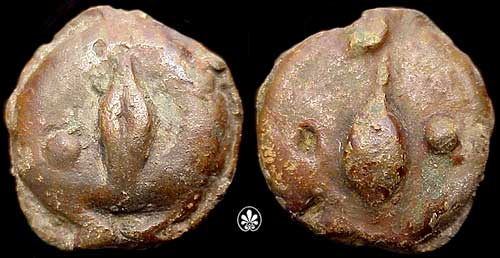
Uncia (coin) (c. 275–270 BC)

== See also ==
- Roman Republican coinage
- Aes rude
- Aes signatum
