= Ounce (disambiguation) =

An ounce is any of several units of mass

Ounce may also be:

- Ounce-force, a unit of force, one sixteenth of a pound-force
- Fluid ounce, any of several units of volume
- Ounce, alternative name for the snow leopard
- Ounce, the codename for the Nintendo Switch 2
- Ounce, in heraldry the same feline as the leopard (heraldry)
- Ounce (roman coin)

== See also ==
- Troy ounce
