= Sextans (coin) =

Ancient Roman coin

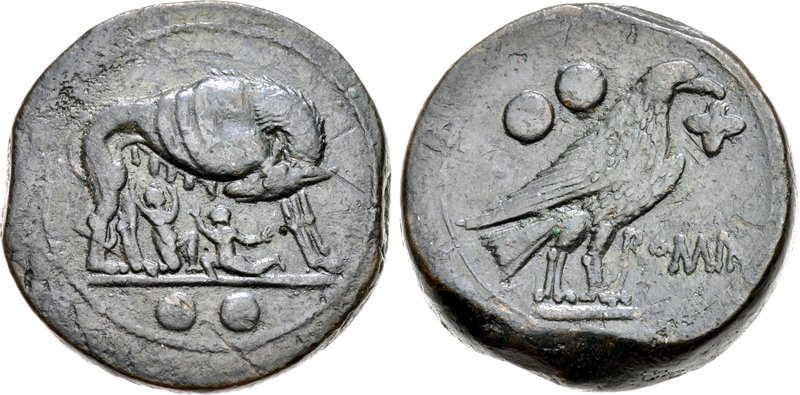
Sextans picturing Romulus and Remus suckling the she-wolf, with an eagle on the reverse, and the two dots representing the value of 2 unciae (217-215 BC)

The sextans was an Ancient Roman bronze coin produced during the Roman Republic valued at one-sixth of an as (2 unciae). An as was roughly 324 grams in weight, thus leaving the sextans at about 54 grams. However, the effects of the Second Punic War on the Republic's economy resulted in its debasement, where the as reduced to about 50 grams, resulting in the sextans weighing about 8 grams. The most common design for the sextans was the bust of Mercury and two pellets (indicating two unciae) on the obverse and the prow of a galley on the reverse. Earlier types depicted a scallop shell, a caduceus, or other symbols on the obverse.

== See also ==
- Roman currency
