= As (Roman coin) =

Bronze and later copper coin used in Ancient Rome

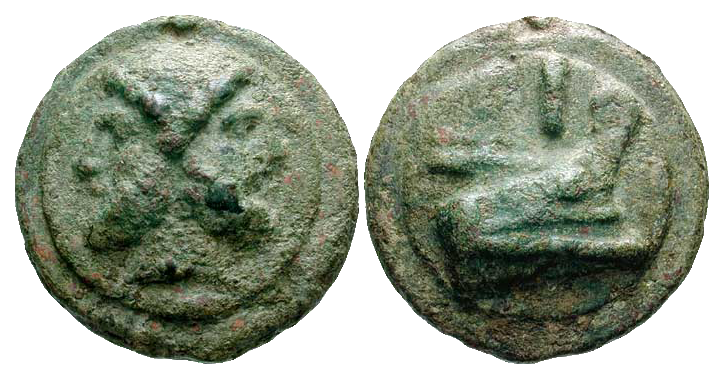
c. 240 – 225 BC. Æ Aes grave As

The as (pl.: assēs; symbol: 𐆚), occasionally assarius (pl.: assarii; Ancient Greek: ἀσσάριον, romanized: assárion), was a bronze, and later copper, coin used during the Roman Republic and Roman Empire.

== Republican era coinage ==
In lieu of coinage, the Romans first used bronze ingots, then disks known as the aes rude. The system thus named as was introduced in ca. 280 BC as a large cast bronze coin during the Roman Republic. The following fractions of the as were also sometimes produced: the dextans (5/6), dodrans (3/4), bes (2/3), semis (1/2), quincunx (5/12), triens (1/3), quadrans (1/4), sextans (1/6), uncia (1/12, also a common weight unit), and semuncia (1/24), as well as multiples of the as, the dupondius (2), sestertius (2 1/2), and tressis (3).

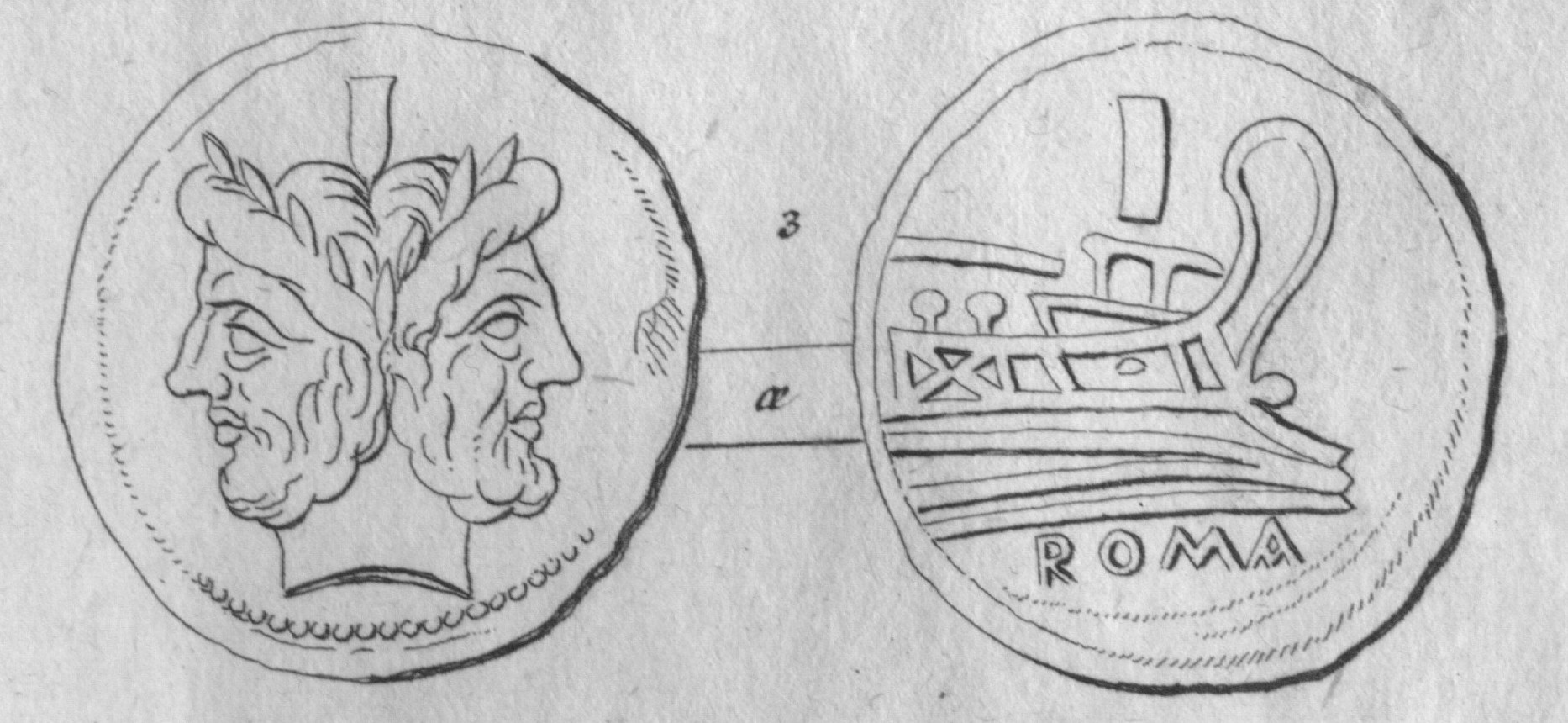
An etching of a Roman Republican as

After the as had been issued as a cast coin for about seventy years, and its weight had been reduced in several stages, a sextantal as was introduced (meaning that it weighed one-sixth of a pound). At about the same time a silver coin, the denarius, was also introduced. Earlier Roman silver coins had been struck on the Greek weight standards that facilitated their use in southern Italy and across the Adriatic, but all Roman coins were now on a Roman weight standard. The denarius, or 'tenner', was at first tariffed at ten assēs, but in about 140 BC it was retariffed at sixteen assēs. This is said to have been a result of financing the Punic Wars.

During the Republic, the as featured the bust of Janus on the obverse, and the prow of a galley on the reverse. The as was originally produced on the libral and then the reduced libral weight standard. As the weight decreased, the bronze coinage of the Republic switched from being cast to being struck. During certain periods, no assēs were produced at all.

== Imperial era coinage ==
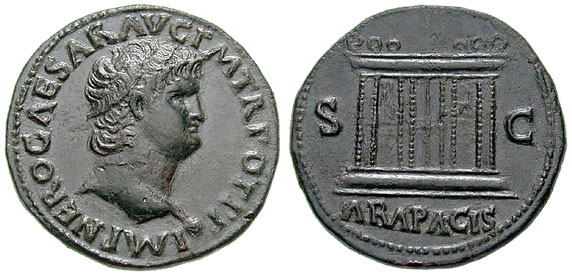
Nero as

Following the coinage reform of Augustus in 23 BC, the as was struck in reddish pure copper (instead of bronze), and the sestertius or 'two-and-a-halfer' (originally 2.5 assēs, but now four assēs) and the dupondius (2 assēs) were produced in a golden-colored alloy of bronze known by numismatists as orichalcum. The as continued to be produced until the 3rd century AD. It was the lowest valued coin regularly issued during the Roman Empire, with semis and quadrans being produced infrequently, and then not at all sometime after the reign of Marcus Aurelius. The last as seems to have been produced by Aurelian between 270 and 275 and at the beginning of the reign of Diocletian.

== Byzantine coinage ==
The as, under its Greek name assarion, was re-established by the Emperor Andronikos II Palaiologos (r. 1282–1328) and minted in great quantities in the first half of the 14th century. It was a low-quality flat copper coin, weighing ca. 3–4 grams and forming the lowest denomination of contemporary Byzantine coinage, being exchanged at 1:768 to the gold hyperpyron. It appears that the designs on the assarion changed annually, hence they display great variations. The assarion was replaced in 1367 by two other copper denominations, the tournesion and the follaro.

== In Unicode ==
A symbol for the Roman as was first included in Unicode 5.1, with its encoding at U+1019A 𐆚 ROMAN AS SIGN, within the Ancient Symbols block.

== See also ==
- Roman currency
- Roman finance
