= Quadrans =

Bronze coin used in Ancient Rome

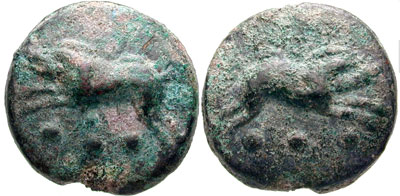
c. 275–270 BC

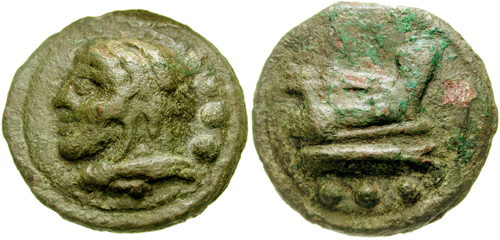
Cast coin. Obverse: bust of Hercules l.; three pellets. Reverse: prow of galley; three pellets.

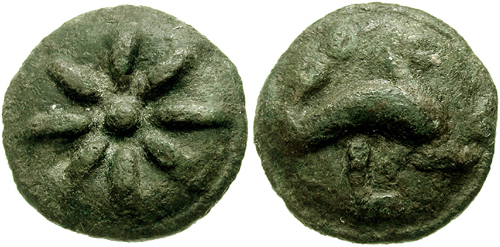
Teruncius (Apulia, Lucera), c. 220 BC

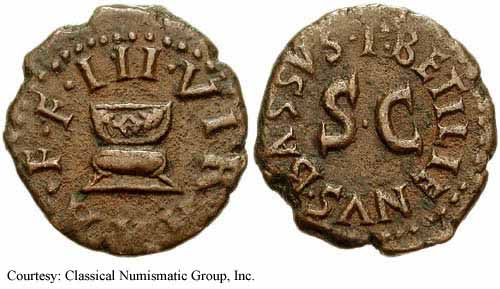
Augustus Quadrans

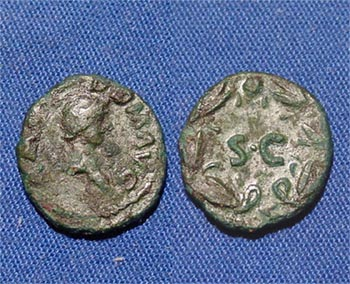
Quadrans of Domitian

The quadrans (lit. 'a quarter') or teruncius (lit. 'three unciae') was a low-value Roman bronze coin worth one quarter of an as. The quadrans was issued from the beginning of cast bronze coins during the Roman Republic, showing three pellets representing three unciae as a mark of value. The obverse type, after some early variations, featured the bust of Hercules, while the reverse featured the prow of a galley. Coins with the same value were issued from other cities in Central Italy, using a cast process.

After c. 90 BC, when bronze coinage was reduced to the semuncial standard, the quadrans became the lowest-valued coin in production. Surviving quadrantes from this period (though that name is not shown on the coins) typically have weights between 1.5 grams and 4 grams, perhaps depending in part on the alloy or metals contained. It was produced sporadically until the time of Antoninus Pius (AD 138–161). Unlike other coins during the Roman Empire, the quadrans rarely bore the image of the emperor, due to its small size.

The Greek word for the quadrans was κοδράντης (kodrantes), which was translated in the King James Version of the Bible as "farthing" (which itself means fourth- + -ing). In the New Testament a coin equal to one half the Attic chalcus was worth about 3/8 of a cent. In the Gospel of Mark, when a poor widow gave two mites or λεπτά (lepta) to the Temple Treasury, the gospel writer noted that this amounted to one quadrans.

== See also ==
- Roman currency
- Semis
