= Semis =

Roman bronze coin

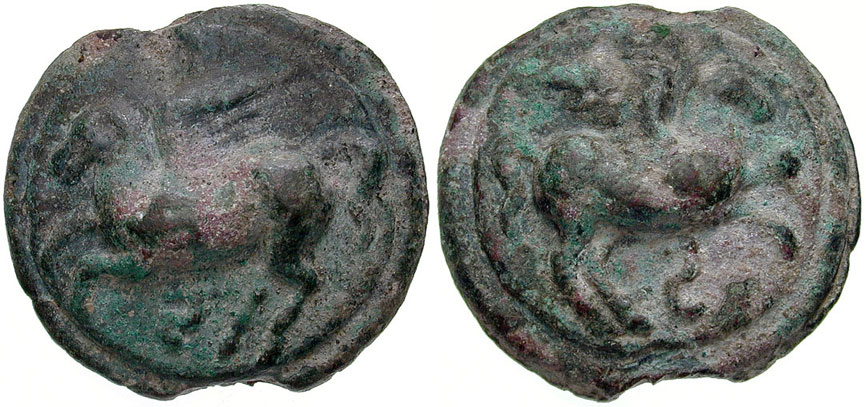
Cast semissis

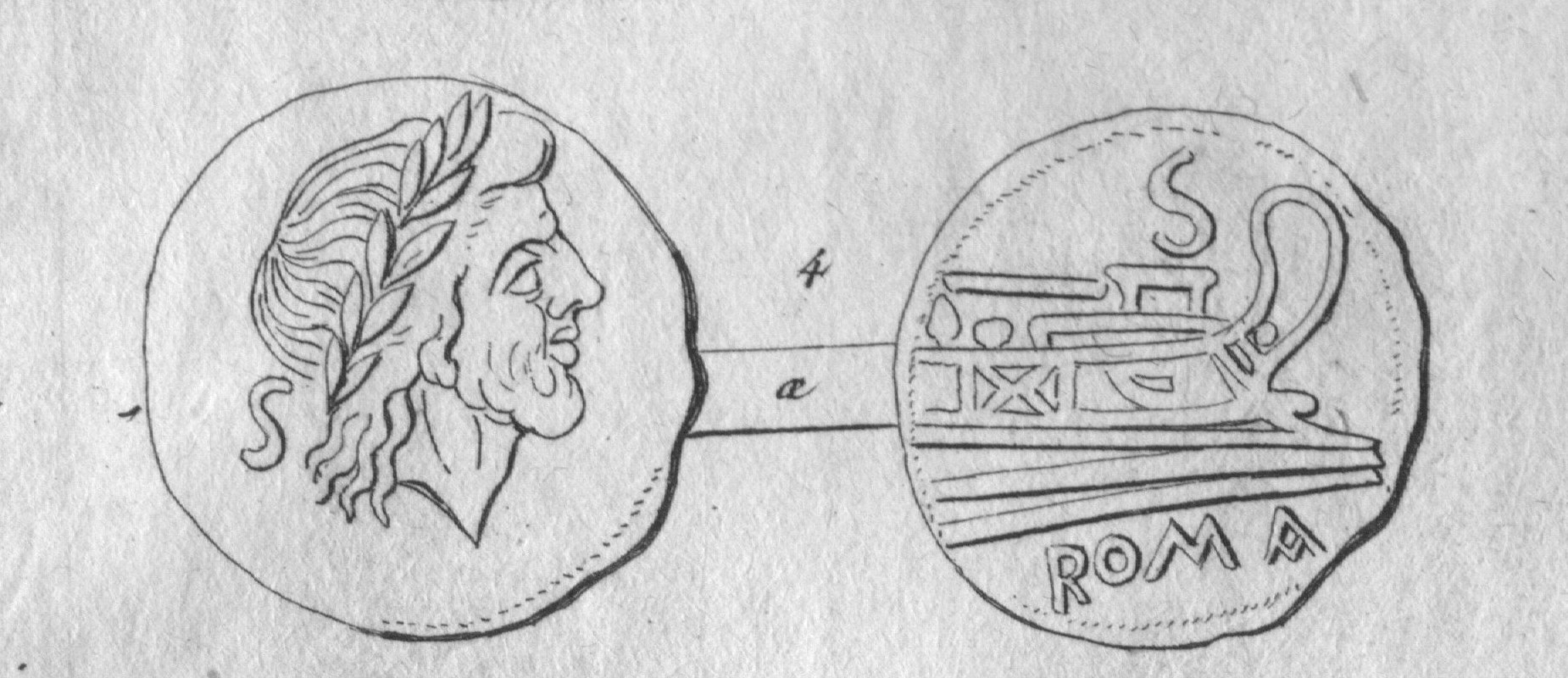

The semis (lit. 'half of an as') was a small Roman bronze coin that was valued at half an as. During the Roman Republic, the semis was distinguished by an 'S' (indicating semis) or 6 dots (indicating a theoretical weight of 6 unciae). Some of the coins featured a bust of Saturn on the obverse, and the prow of a ship on the reverse.

Initially a cast coin, like the rest of Roman Republican bronzes, it began to be struck from dies shortly before the Second Punic War (218–201 BC). Following the Augustan Coinage reforms of 23 BC the semis became the smallest orichalcum (brass) denomination, having twice the value of a copper quadrans and half the value of the copper as. Its size and diameter corresponded directly to the quadrans, so its value was attained from brass having double the value of copper. The coin was issued infrequently and it ceased to be issued by the time of Hadrian (117–138 AD).

In the early Imperial period, a semis could buy a cerae (wax writing tablet).

== See also ==
- Roman currency
