= Uncia (coin) =

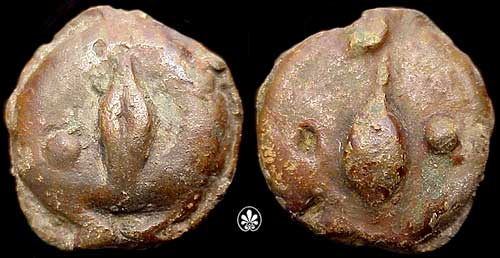
Issued in Rome between 275–270 BC

The uncia (Latin; lit. 'twelfth part') was a Roman currency worth one twelfth of an as.

== Republican coin ==
By derivation, it was also the name of a bronze coin valued at 1/12 of an as made during the Roman Republic. The uncia started as a Roman-Oscan weight of 22.75 grams for a 273-gram pound (libra), with Attic weight issues of about 27 grams under the libral standard for a 327 gram pound and was produced occasionally towards the beginning of Roman cast bronze coinage. Obverse types of the uncia include a knucklebone (c. 289–245 BC), a barleycorn (c. 280–245 BC), and the helmeted bust of Roma (from c. 240 BC).

== Empire coin ==
In imperial times the uncia was briefly revived under Trajan (98–117) and Hadrian (117–138). This coin was about 11–14 mm (0.43–0.55 in) in diameter and weighed about 0.8–1.2 grams (0.028–0.042 oz). It featured the bust of the emperor on the obverse with no inscription and "SC" (for Senatu Consulto) in a wreath on the reverse. If this issue belonged to the imperial system, meaning it was not a provincial piece, it would be an uncia. This issue may have been made only for circulation in the East.

== See also ==
- Duella
- Roman currency
- Roman Republican coinage
