= Coinage reform of Augustus =

Ancient Roman currency reform

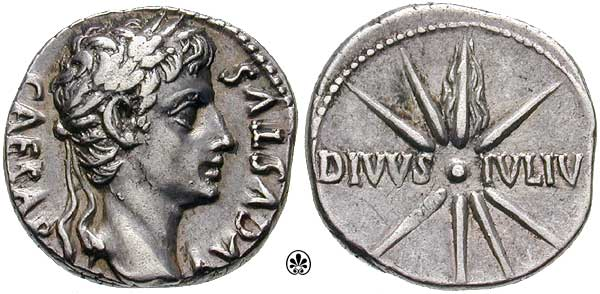
A denarius minted c. 18 BC during the reign of Augustus; Obverse: CAESAR AVGVSTVS; reverse: comet of eight rays with tail upward; DIVVS IVLIV[S] (DIVINE JULIUS).

The coinage reform of Augustus refers to the reform of Roman currency undertaken by Augustus in 23 BC, for the coins minted during his reign.

== The reform ==
Augustus brought the minting of gold and silver coins, the aureus and denarius, under his personal control while it is thought he left the minting of bronze coinage under senatorial control. Throughout these reforms, Augustus did not alter the coins' weight or fineness. The gold aureus, weighing about one-quarter ounce, was worth twenty-five silver denarii, weighing about one-eighth of a troy ounce.

Augustus more comprehensively reformed denominations below the denarius. New ratios were fixed among the currencies: the sestertius was now minted from about an ounce of orichalcum, an alloy of copper and zinc, rather than silver, and fixed at a quarter of a denarius. The dupondius, formerly a two-pound bronze coin, was now orichalcum, valued at half a sestertius and weighing half as much. The half-ounce as, worth half a dupondius, the semis, worth half an as, and the quadrans, worth half a semis, were the first pure copper coins minted in Rome since 84 BC.
