= Aureus =

Gold coin of ancient Rome

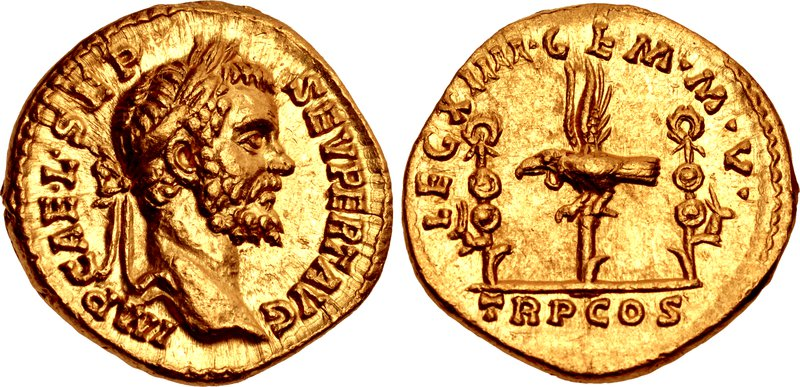
Aureus minted in 193 by Septimius Severus to celebrate Legio XIV Gemina, the legion that proclaimed him emperor

The aureus (pl. aurei, 'golden') was the main gold coin of ancient Rome from the 1st century BC to the early 4th century AD, when it was replaced by the solidus. This type of coin was sporadically issued during the Republic and standardized during the Empire, originally valued at 25 silver denarii and 100 sestertii. It was about the same size as the denarius, but heavier than the denarius since gold is denser than silver.

== During the Republic ==
The production of proper Roman coins began in the 3rd century BC and was limited to the minting of bronze asses; the gold brought back from spoils and war indemnities was stored in the public treasury (Aerarium). According to the needs of the state finances, the gold in the reserve was sold for minted silver, at a ratio of 1 to 12. The Second Punic War (218–201), due to its considerable financing needs, made it necessary to draw on the reserves of precious metal. Rome therefore issued silver denarii and several series of aurei, but the production of gold coins ceased after the war.

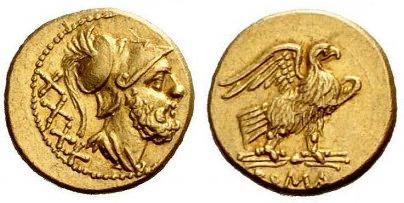
Issue worth 40 (XXXX) asses, 211 BC. The obverse depicts the god Mars.

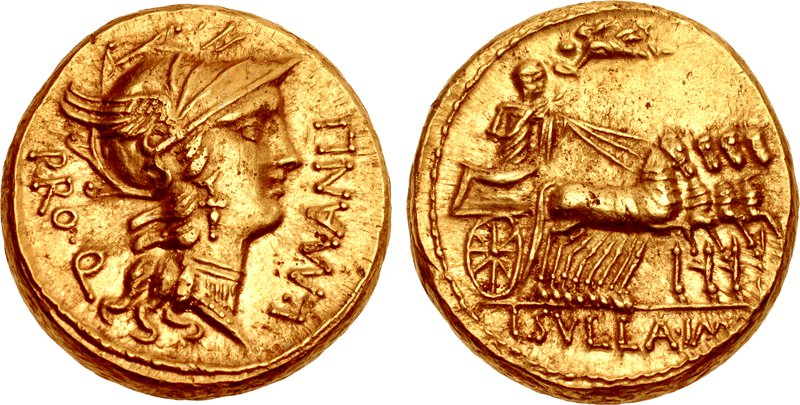
Issue minted by Sulla, 82 BC. The obverse depicts Roma.

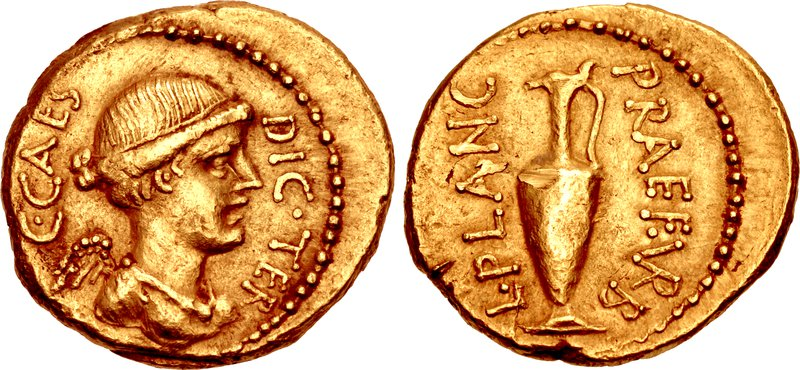
Issue minted by Caesar, 45 BC. The obverse depicts Victory.

In the years following 87 BC, and in exceptional circumstances, the general Sulla resumed issuing gold coins during his campaign in Greece. Disowned by the Senate and deprived of its financial support, he seized the treasures of the Greeks and used them to issue gold or silver coins bearing his name. These issues also served a propaganda purpose during the ensuing civil war.

In 49 BC, Julius Caesar, claiming that the Republic was in danger, seized the gold reserve of the public treasury and used it alongside his personal wealth during his civil war. The minting of the aureus resumed in itinerant workshops following the movements of Caesar's legions, then in Rome, at the standard weight equivalent to one-fortieth of a Roman pound, about 8 grams. This coin, made of pure gold, was called aureus nummus or denarius aureus, "gold denarius". Shortly before his death, Caesar began issuing silver coins with his own portrait, a departure from traditional coinage.

The period following the assassination of Julius Caesar in 44 BC saw competition between various factions, each mobilizing its own army and paying its soldiers in gold coins. Mints competing with that of Rome multiplied in Italy, Gaul, Roman Africa, Sicily, along with itinerant ones depending on the movements of the armies. Each faction leader had his effigy and emblems struck: the triumvirs (Mark Antony, Lepidus and Caesar's nephew Octavian), the "liberators" Brutus and Cassius Longinus, and Sextus Pompey (the son of Pompey the Great). Octavian became sole master of the Roman world in 31 BC, after defeating his last opposition at Actium. Four years later, in 27 BC, he assumed the name and title of Augustus, marking his accession as the first Roman emperor.

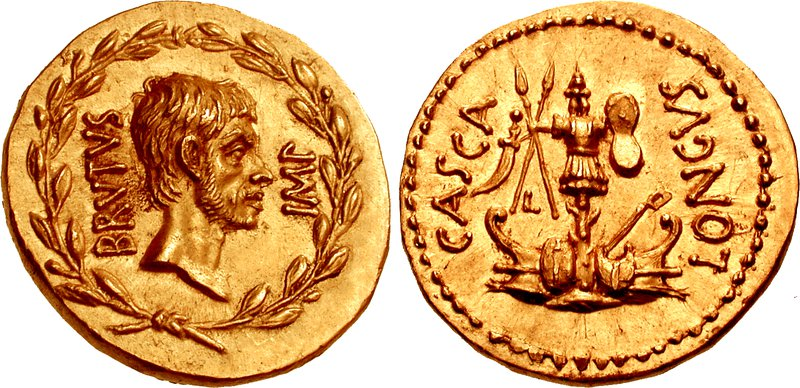
Issue by Brutus, 42 BC.

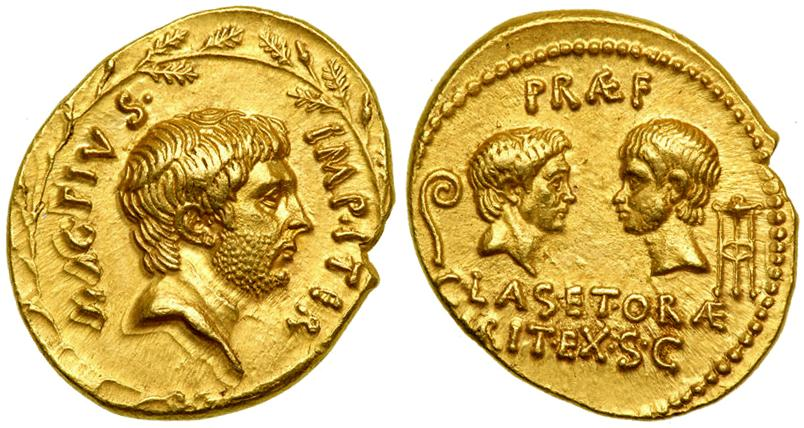
Issue by Sextus Pompey, 42 BC.

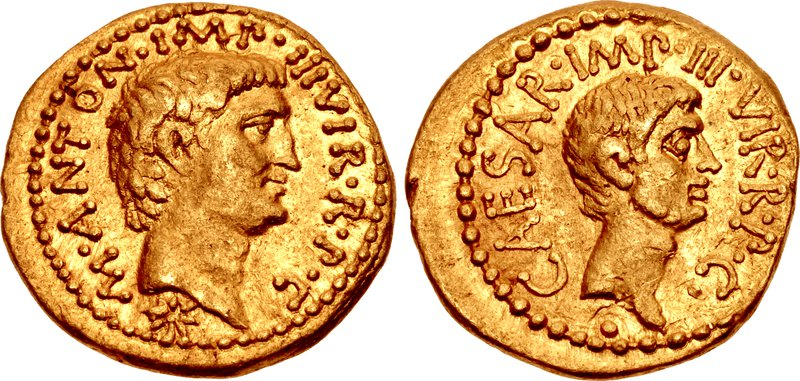
Issue by Antony and Octavian, 40 BC.

== Early Empire ==
Julius Caesar struck the coin more often, and standardized the weight at one-fortieth of a Roman pound, about 8 grams. Octavian Augustus tariffed the value of the sestertius as one-hundredth of an aureus. The aureus, which mint was placed at Lugdunum, weighed 1/42 of a pound (7.79 grams) and was worth 25 denarii and 100 sestertii. A sub-multiple existed, the gold quinarius or half-aureus. The Augustan system of the 1st century was as follows:

	Aureus	Quinarius (gold)	Denarius	Quinarius	Sestertius	Dupondius	As	Semis	Quadrans
Aureus	1	2	25	50	100	200	400	800	1600
Quinarius Aureus	1/2	1	12 1/2	25	50	100	200	400	800
Denarius	1/25	2/25	1	2	4	8	16	32	64
Quinarius Argenteus	1/50	1/25	1/2	1	2	4	8	16	32
Sestertius	1/100	1/50	1/4	1/2	1	2	4	8	16
Dupondius	1/200	1/100	1/8	1/4	1/2	1	2	4	8
As	1/400	1/200	1/16	1/8	1/4	1/2	1	2	4
Semis	1/800	1/400	1/32	1/16	1/8	1/4	1/2	1	2
Quadrans	1/1600	1/800	1/64	1/32	1/16	1/8	1/4	1/2	1

The mass of the aureus was decreased to 1/45 of a Roman pound (7.3 g) during the reign of Nero (r. 54–68). According to Cassius Dio, writing at the start of the 3rd century, notes that the aureus was still worth 100 sesterii, and comments that it was equivalent to 20 Greek drachmas. At about the same time the purity of the silver coinage was also slightly decreased.

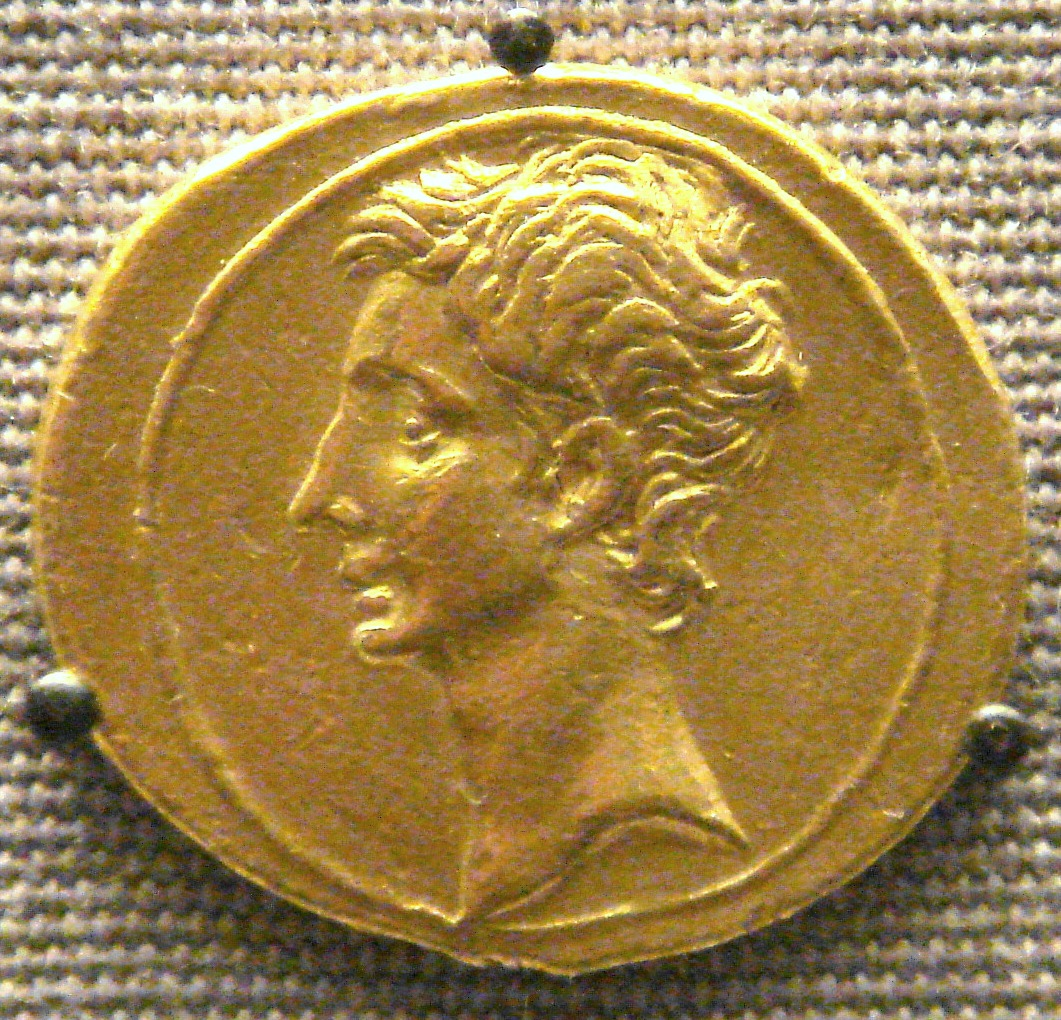
Aureus of Octavian, c. 30 BC

After the reign of Marcus Aurelius (r. 161–180) the production of aurei decreased, and the weight fell to one-fiftieth of a Roman pound (6.5 g) by the time of Caracalla (r. 211–217).

During the 3rd century, the Roman Empire experienced a 50-year period of instability that also saw an increasingly severe economic and monetary crisis. The number and weight of aurei produced decreased more and more rapidly, dropping from about 7.20 grams under Septimius Severus (r. 193–211) to less than 3.50 grams under Valerian (r. 253–260), about half of its original value. The simultaneous devaluation of gold and silver coins caused their mutual devaluation. While the correspondence of 25 denarii for 1 aureus was maintained during the 1st and 2nd centuries, the value of the aureus became unstable: a Greek inscription under the reign of Philip (r. 244–249) gives 1 aureus for 21 antoninianii, or 42 denarii.

In addition, gold pieces were introduced in a variety of fractions and multiples, making it hard to determine the intended denomination of a gold coin. Under Gallienus(r. 253–258), the purity was briefly reduced to 94%, and a small amount of coins were minted with as low as 80% purity. This was reset back to 99% by the next emperor.

The devalued aureus would be replaced by the solidus, during the 4th century. An early form of this coin was first introduced by Diocletian (r. 284–305) around 301 AD, when he struck at 60 to the Roman pound of pure gold (and thus weighing about 5.5 grams each) and with an initial value equal to 1,000 denarii. In that same year, Diocletian issued the Edict on Maximum Prices fixing a price for minted gold of 72,000 denarii per pound, or more than a thousand denarii for one aureus, the denarius being no more than a unit of account. This authoritarian measure did nothing but stop the fluctuation of the aureus. Diocletian's solidus was struck only in small quantities, and thus had only minimal economic effect, although its stable weight brought an end to the instability that had existed for a while.

When the solidus was reintroduced by Constantine I (r. 306–337) in 312 AD, permanently replacing the aureus as the gold coin of the Roman Empire, it was struck at a rate of 72 to a Roman pound of pure gold, each coin weighing twenty-four Greco-Roman carats, or about 4.5 grams of gold per coin. By this time, the solidus was worth 275,000 of the increasingly debased denarii. However, regardless of the size or weight of the aureus, the coin's purity was little affected. Due to runaway inflation caused by the Roman government's issuing base-metal coinage but refusing to accept anything other than silver or gold for tax payments, the value of the gold aureus in relation to the denarius grew drastically. Inflation was also affected by the systematic debasement of the silver denarius, which by the mid-3rd century had practically no silver left in it.

Gold content
Ruler	Year	Average
Caesar	44 BC	8.18 grams
Augustus	14 AD	7.80 grams
Tiberius	37 AD	~ 7.75 grams
Caligula	41 AD	~ 7.72 grams
Claudius	54 AD	~ 7.66 grams
Nero	68 AD	7.28 grams
Galba	69 AD	7.26 grams
Otho	69 AD	7.24 grams
Titus	81 AD	~ 7.21 grams
Domitian	96 AD	~ 7.40 grams
Nerva	98 AD	~ 7.54 grams
Trajan	117	7.22 grams
Hadrian	138	7.19 grams
Antoninus	161	7.19 grams
Marcus	180	7.19 grams
Commodus	192	7.26 grams
Pertinax	193	7.19 grams
Severus	211	7.19 grams
Caracalla	217	6.48 grams
Alexander	235	6.30 grams
Maximinus	238	5.80 grams
Pupienus	238	5.54 grams
Balbinus	238	5.54 grams
Gordian III	244	4.86 grams
Philip	249	4.40 grams
Decius	251	4.30 grams
Gallus	253	3.65 grams
Valerian	260	3.40 grams
Diocletian	290	5.46 grams

Today, the aureus is highly sought after by collectors because of its purity and value, as well its historical interest. An aureus is usually much more expensive than a denarius issued by the same emperor. For instance, in one auction, an aureus of Trajan (r. 98–117) sold for $15,000, and a silver coin of the same emperor sold for $100. The most expensive aureus ever sold was one issued in 42 BC by Marcus Junius Brutus, the assassin of Gaius Julius Caesar, which had a price realized of $3.5 million in November 2020; there is an example of this coin on permanent display at the British Museum in London. An aureus, issued by the emperor Alexander Severus (r. 222–235), has a picture of the Colosseum on the reverse, and had a price realized of $920,000 in 2008. An aureus with the face of Allectus was auctioned off in the United Kingdom for £552,000 in June 2019.

Imperial aurei from Augustus to Alexander

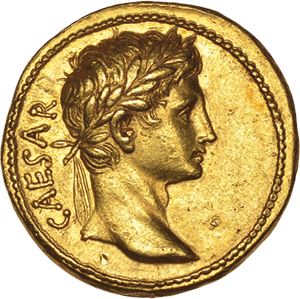
1. Augustus

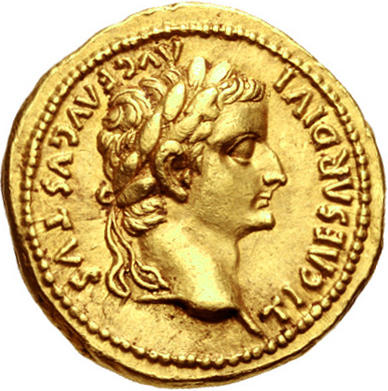
2. Tiberius

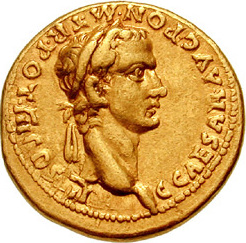
3. Caligula

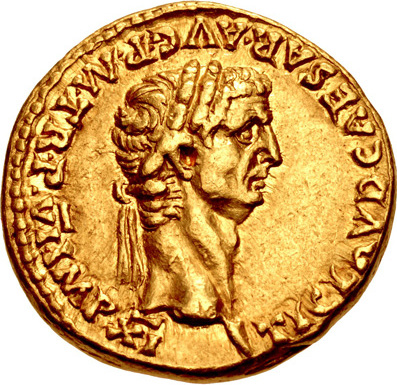
4. Claudius

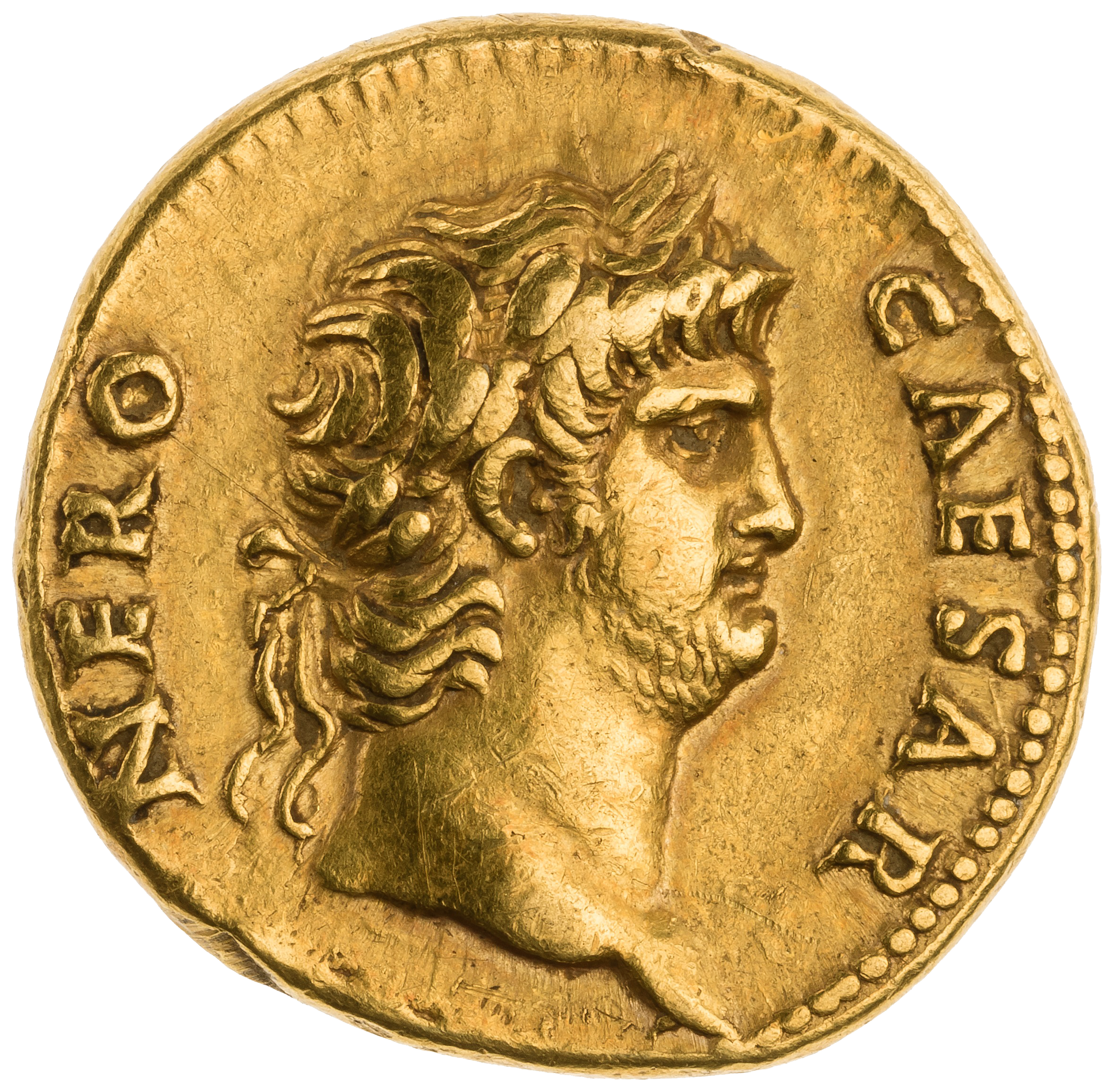
5. Nero

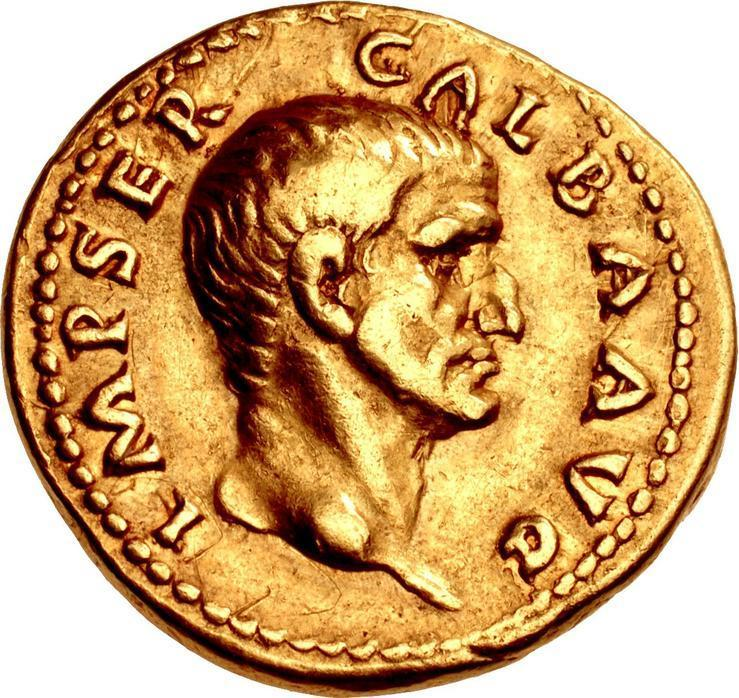
6. Galba

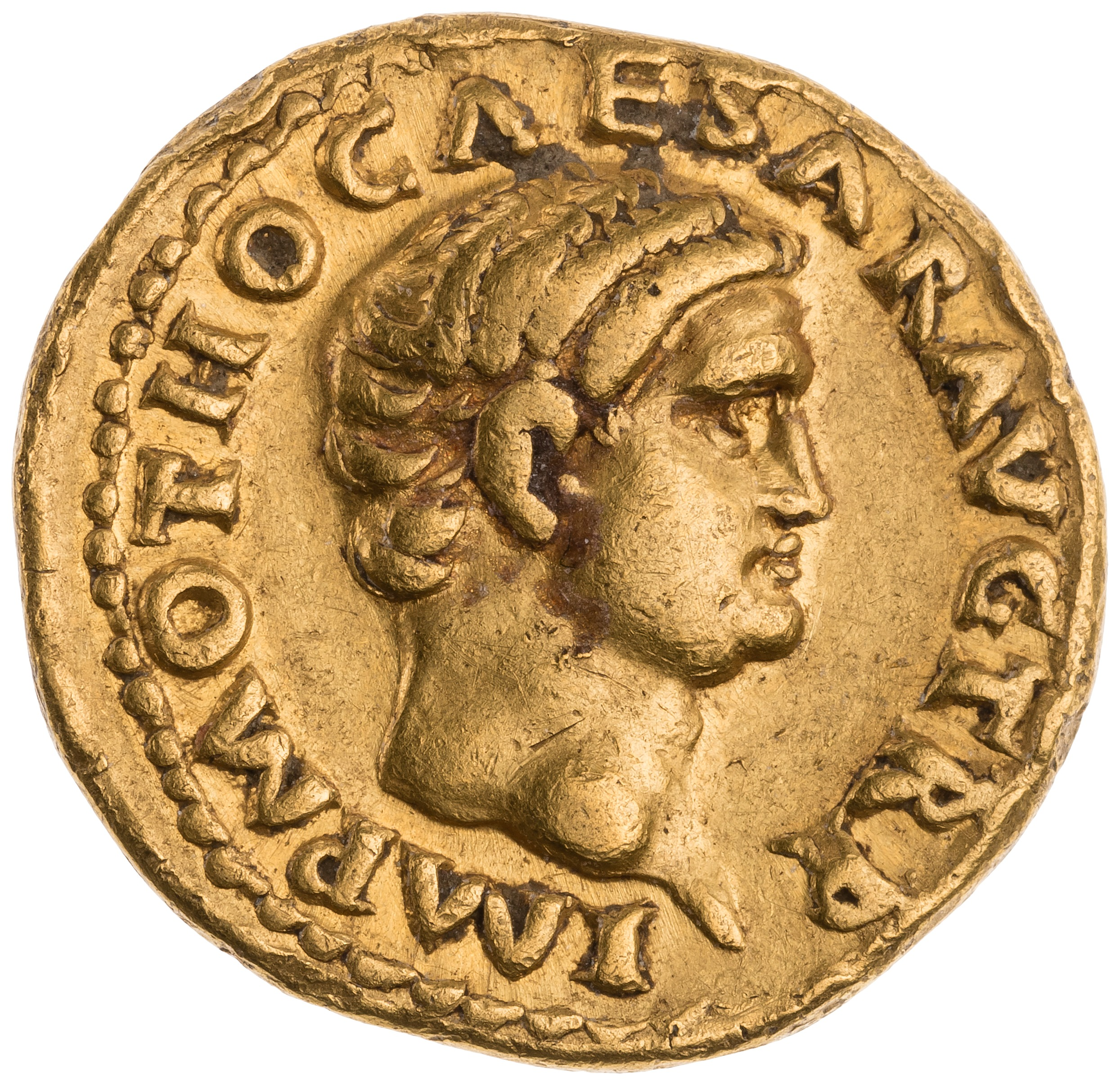
7. Otho

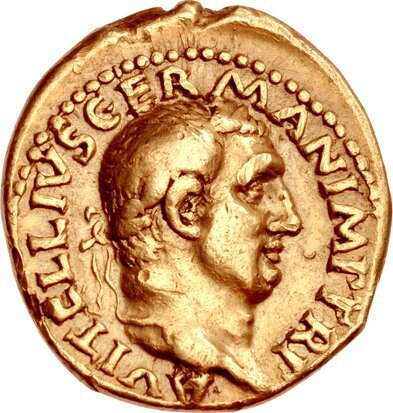
8. Vitellius

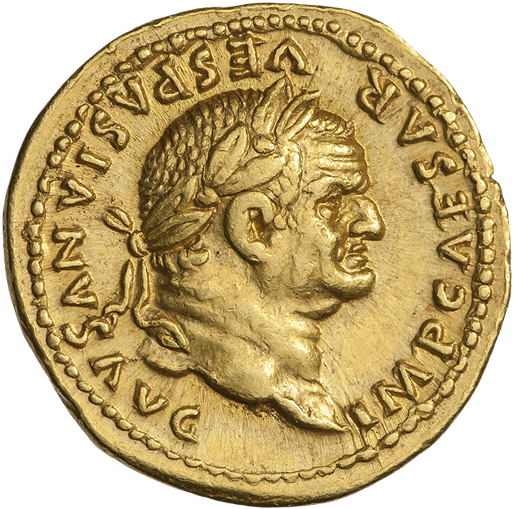
9. Vespasian

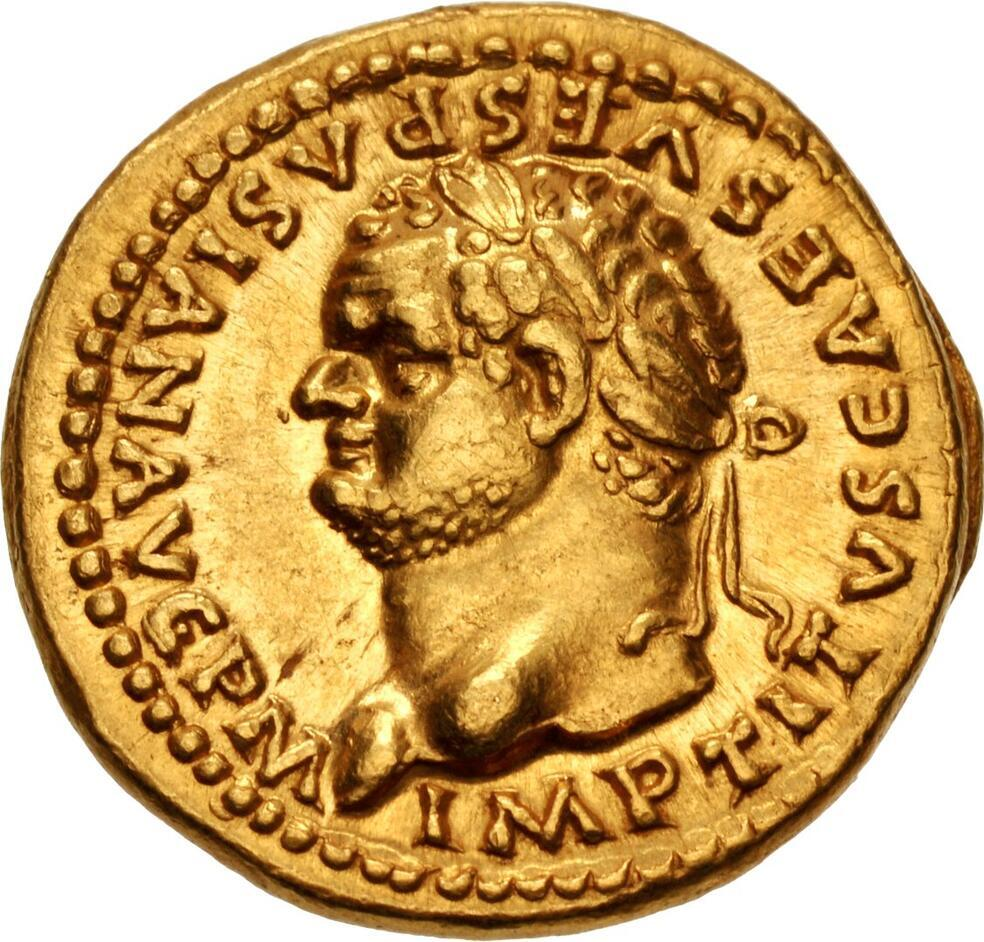
10. Titus

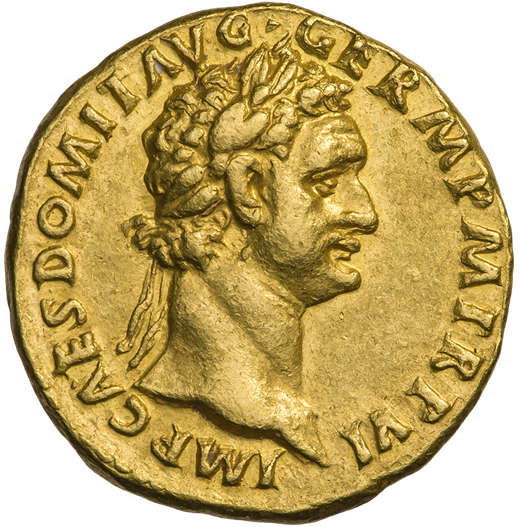
11. Domitian

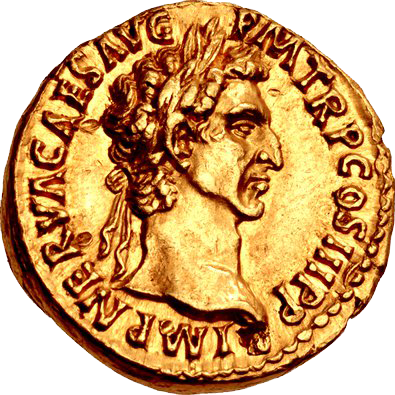
12. Nerva

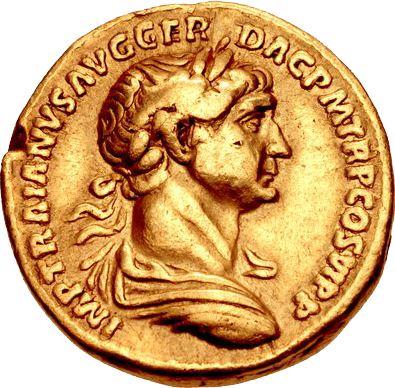
13. Trajan

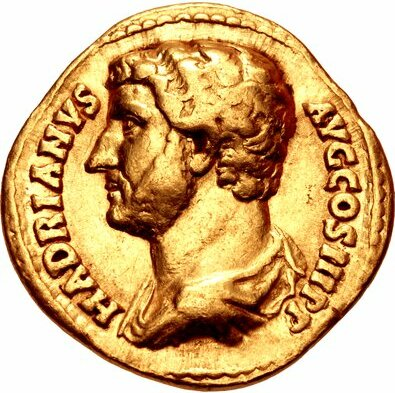
14. Hadrian

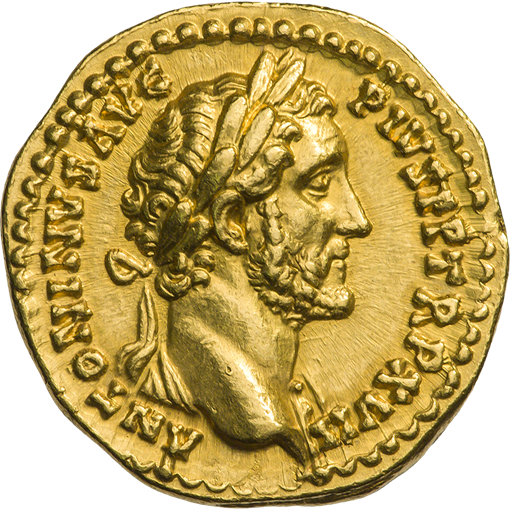
15. Antoninus

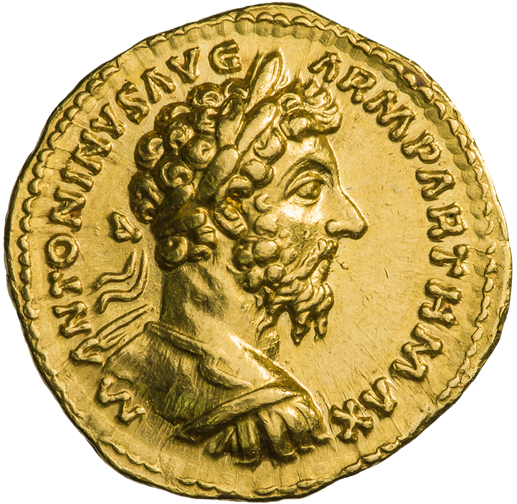
16. Marcus

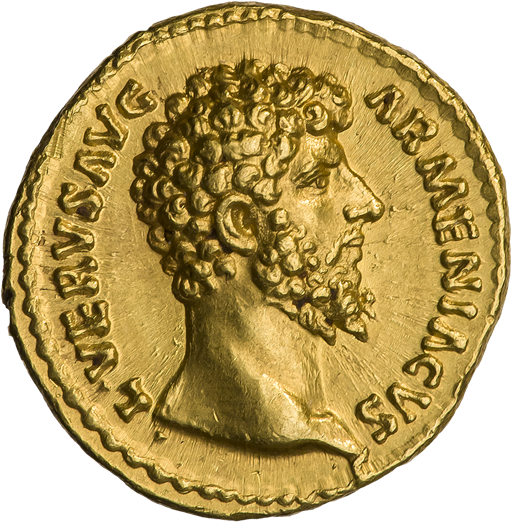
17. Lucius

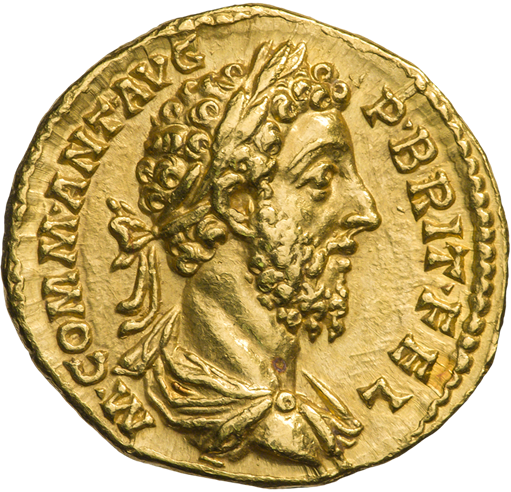
18. Commodus

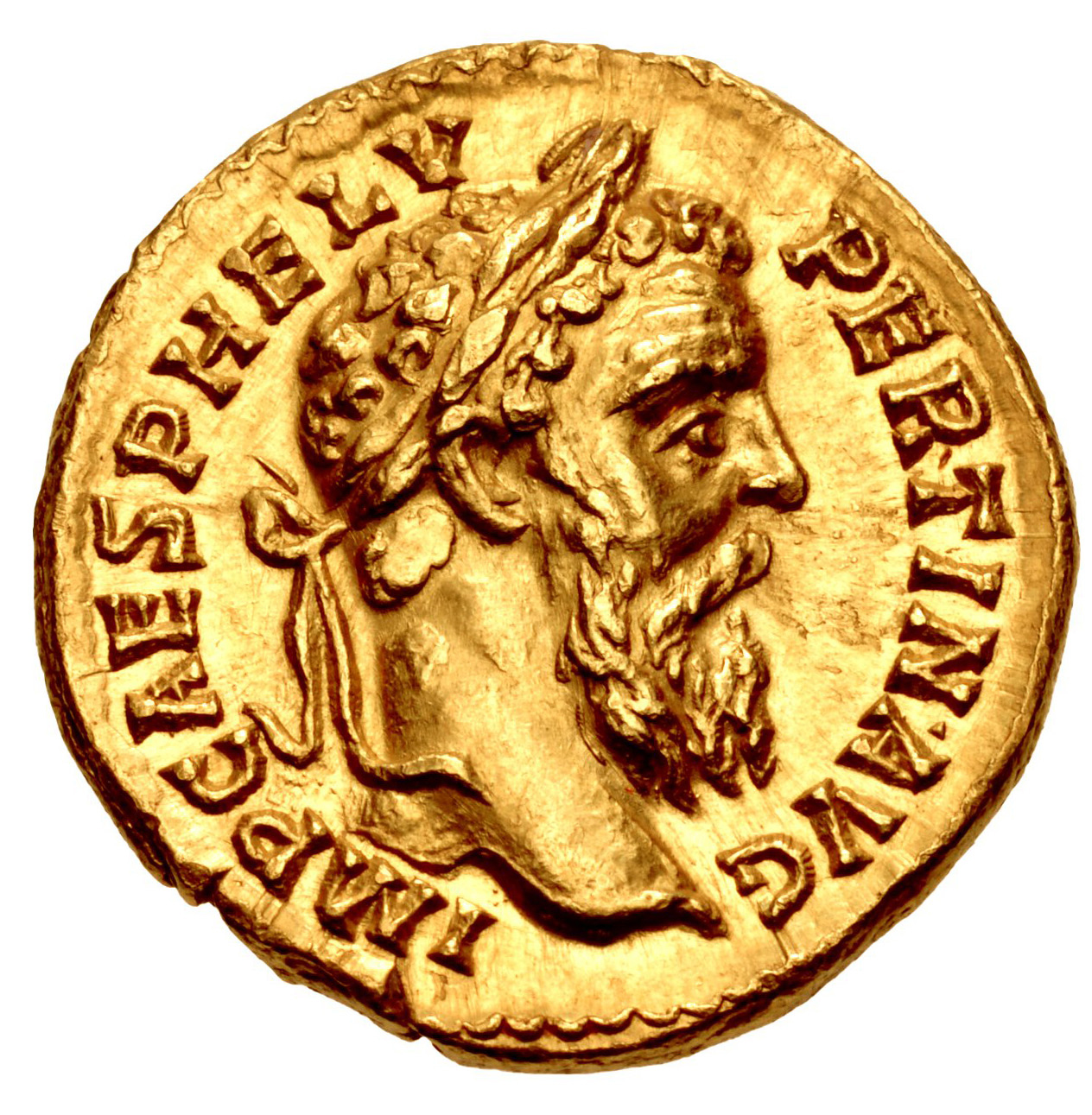
19. Pertinax

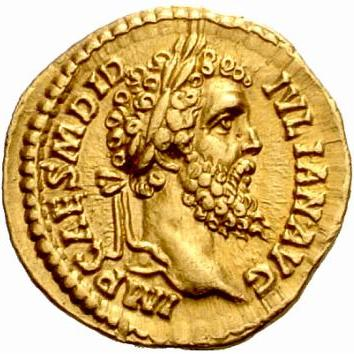
20. Julianus

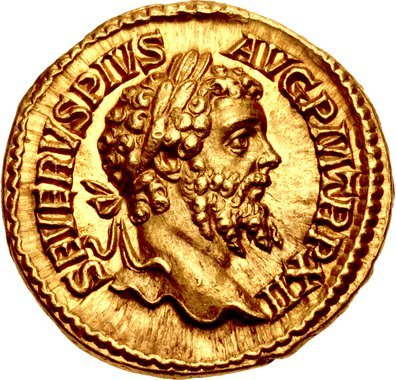
21. Severus

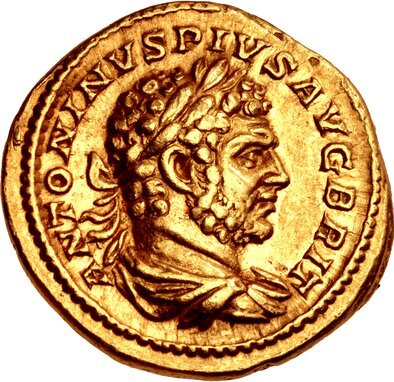
22. Caracalla

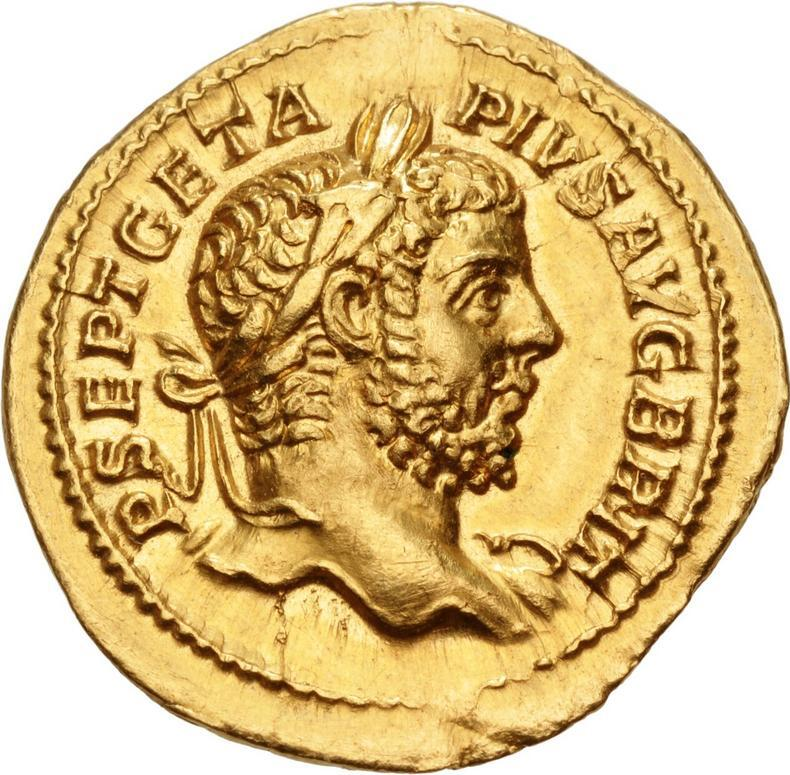
23. Geta

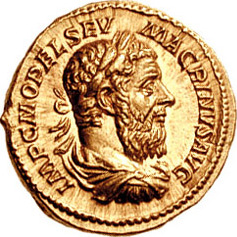
24. Macrinus

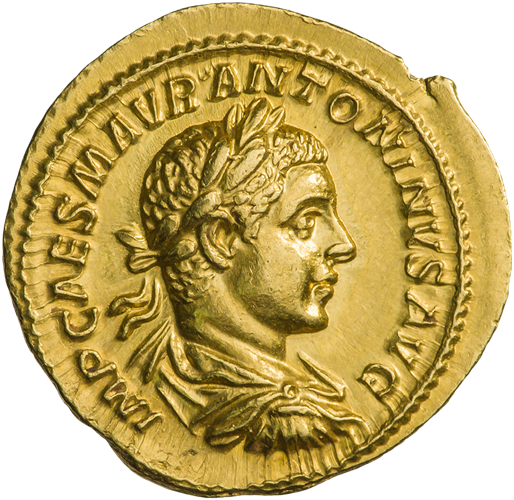
25. Elagabalus

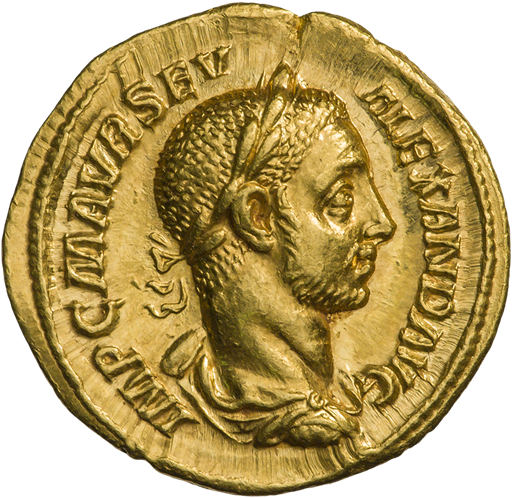
26. Alexander

== See also ==
- Roman currency
- Coinage reform of Augustus
