= Quinarius =

Silver Roman coin, half a denarius

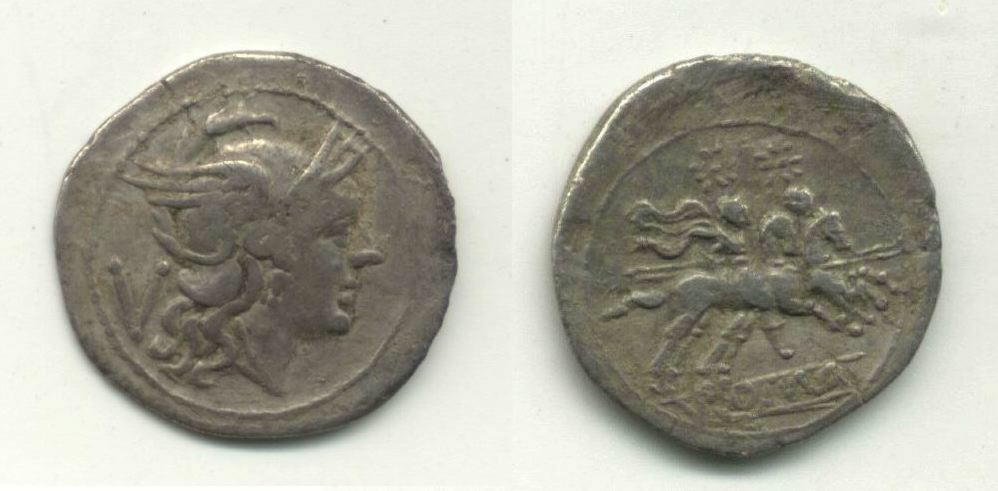
A quinarius of 90 BC of L. Calpurnius Piso Frugi: Obv.: head of Roma right in a winged helmetq; V (asses) for quinarius. Rev.: Dioscuri riding right, stars above heads; ROMA below.

The quinarius (plural: quinarii; symbol: 𐆗) was a small silver Roman coin valued at half a denarius.

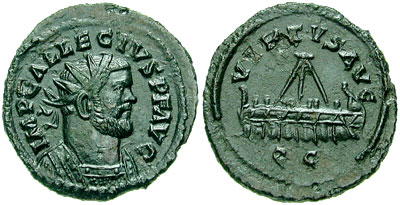
Æ quinarius of Allectus, Camulodunum (Colchester) mint. Obv.: IMP C ALLECTVS P F AVG, radiate, cuirassed bust right. Rev.: VIRTVS AVG, galley rowing left; QC in exergue.

The quinarius was struck for a few years, along with the silver sestertius, following the introduction of the denarius in 211 BC. At this time the quinarius was valued at 5 asses. The coin was reintroduced in 101 BC as a replacement for the victoriatus, this time valued at 8 asses due to retariffing of the denarius to 16 asses in 118 BC. For a few years following its reintroduction, large quantities of quinarii were produced, mostly for circulation in Gaul. The coin was produced sporadically until the 3rd century. Its symbol is 𐆗.

The term gold quinarius or quinarius aureus is used to describe the half-aureus, which is valued at 12 1/2 denarii. This term has no ancient authority.
