= Quadrigatus =

Silver coin produced by the Roman Republic

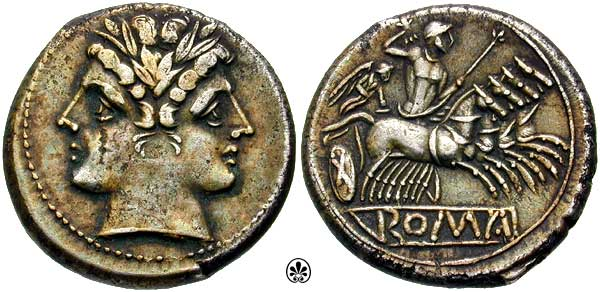
Didrachm or quadrigatus (ca. 225–212 BC), with a laureate head of Janus or the twinned Dioscuri, and Victory driving a quadriga (four-horse chariot)

The quadrigatus was a medium-sized silver coin produced by the Roman Republic during the 3rd century BC. The obverse featured a young janiform bust and the reverse featured Victory driving a (four-horse chariot), quadriga in Latin, giving the coin its Roman name, with the inscription "ROMA" below. The quadriga was first seen on coins produced for Greek mints. The coin weighed about 6.8 grams (6 scruples), consistent with the weight of a south Italian Greek didrachm.

== History and iconography ==
The quadrigatus was minted for a number of years until shortly before the introduction of the denarius, which occurred a few years before 211 BC. Gold coins were issued at about the time that the quadrigatus was discontinued (staters and half-staters) which featured the same obverse type as the quadrigatus and the reverse type of two soldiers performing an oath over a third soldier holding a pig, with the inscription "ROMA" below. The choice of Janus for these coins is believed to coincide with the closing of the doors of the Temple of Janus, indicating the absence of warfare, a rare occasion. Michael Crawford, however, has suggested that the janiform head is more likely to have represented the Dioscuri, since Janus is usually a mature and bearded figure.

Roman-era historians such as Livy and Plutarch often refer to these early coins as denarii, but modern numismatic references consider them as anonymous Roman silver, produced before the standardization of the denarius just before 211 B.C.

The victoriatus was a later silver coin that was valued at half a quadrigatus (3 scruples). Its name was given to it because the reverse showed Victory personified, placing a wreath upon a trophy.

== See also ==
- Roman currency
