= Dupondius =

Ancient Roman coin denomination

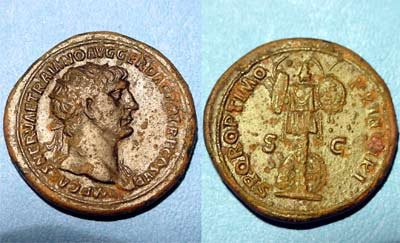

First side of the image: O: Trajan wearing radiate crown IMP CAES NERVAE TRAIANO AVG GER DAC P M TR P COS V P P
Second side of the image: R: Tropaion SPQR OPTIMO PRINCIPI / S C
Orichalcum dupondius struck in Rome 104 ref.: RIC 586

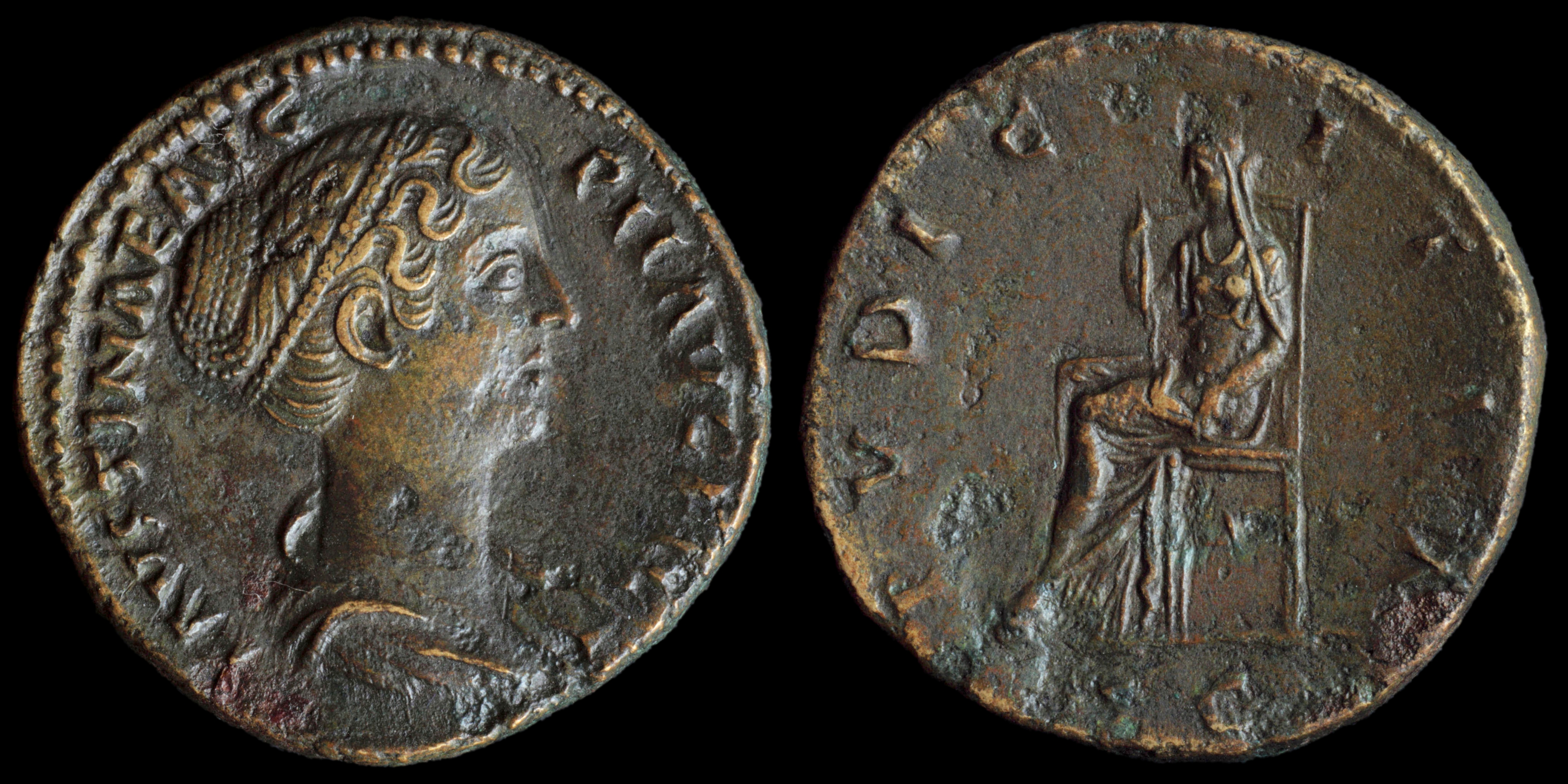

First side of the image: O: Draped bust of Faustina the Younger FAVSTINAE AVG PII AVG FIL
Second side of the image: R: Sitting Pudicitia PVDICITIA; S C (below)
Orichalcum dupondius struck in Rome c. 147–150 ref.: RIC 1404(b)

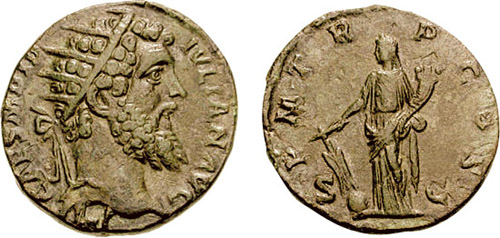

First side of the image: O: Didius Julianus wearing radiate crown IMP CAES M DID IVLIANVS AVG
Second side of the image: R: Fortuna holding cornucopia and gubernaculum (rudder) on globe P M TR P COS / S C
Very rare dupondius struck in Rome 193 ref.: RIC 12.

The dupondius (Latin two-pounder; symbol: 𐆙) was a brass coin used during the Roman Republic and Roman Empire valued at 2 asses (4/5 of a sestertius or 1/5 of a denarius during the Republic and 1/2 of a sestertius or 1/8 of a denarius during the time of Augustus).

The dupondius was introduced during the Roman Republic as a large bronze cast coin, although even at introduction it weighed less than 2 Roman pounds (librae). The initial coins featured the bust of Roma on the obverse and a six-spoked wheel on the reverse. A loaf of bread or a sextarius (c. 0.5 L) of wine cost roughly one dupondius at the height of the Roman Empire, though due to the debasement of the denarius over the following century, the dupondius was discarded.

With the coinage reform of Augustus in about 23 BC, the sestertius and dupondius were produced in a type of brass called orichalcum by the Romans and numismatists, while lower denominations were produced out of reddish copper. However, some dupondii were made entirely from copper under Augustus, while under Nero some asses were made from both orichalcum and copper, instead of only copper for asses coined until then. Therefore, the latter can only be distinguished from dupondii by their smaller size instead of by also the appearance of the metal.

The dupondius was normally further distinguished from the similarly sized as with the addition of a radiate crown to the bust of the emperor in 66 AD during the reign of Nero. Using a radiate crown to indicate double value was also markedly used on the antoninianus (double denarius) introduced by Caracalla and the double sestertius. Since dupondii minted prior to and during the reign of Nero, and occasionally under later rulers, lack the radiate crown, it is often hard to distinguish between the as and the dupondius due to heavy patina which often obscures the coin's original color.

An extremely rare dupondius from the reign of Marcus Aurelius, dated to 154 or 155 and in excellent condition, was discovered in 2007 at the archaeological site in Draper's Gardens, London.

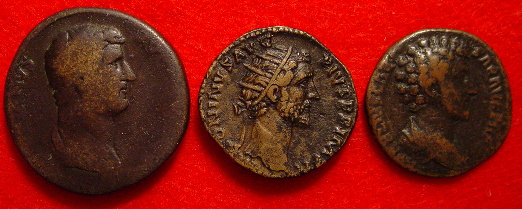
Sestertius of Hadrian, dupondius of Antoninus Pius, and as of Marcus Aurelius

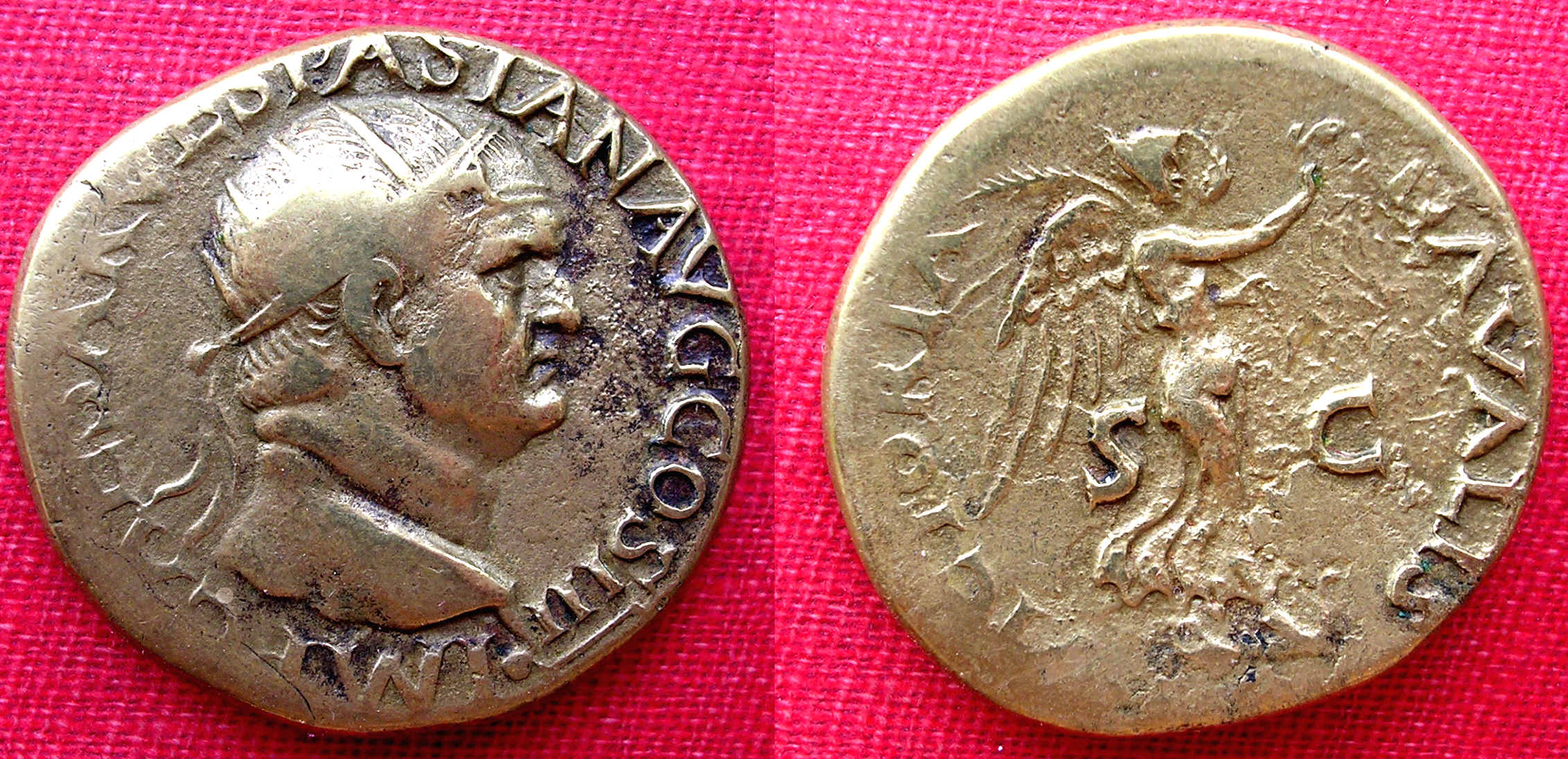
Dupondius of Vespasian (69–79), struck at Lyon in about 72–73. This coin seems to have escaped the serious corrosion typically observed in ancient coins and thus retains nearly its original appearance and colour, showing why the Romans sometimes also called this alloy aurichalcum, from aurum for gold in Latin+"-chalcum" as in the most widely used orichalcum. The coin measures about 29mm in diameter.

== See also ==
- Roman currency
