= Double sestertius =

Large Roman coin made of brass issued in 249-251 AD

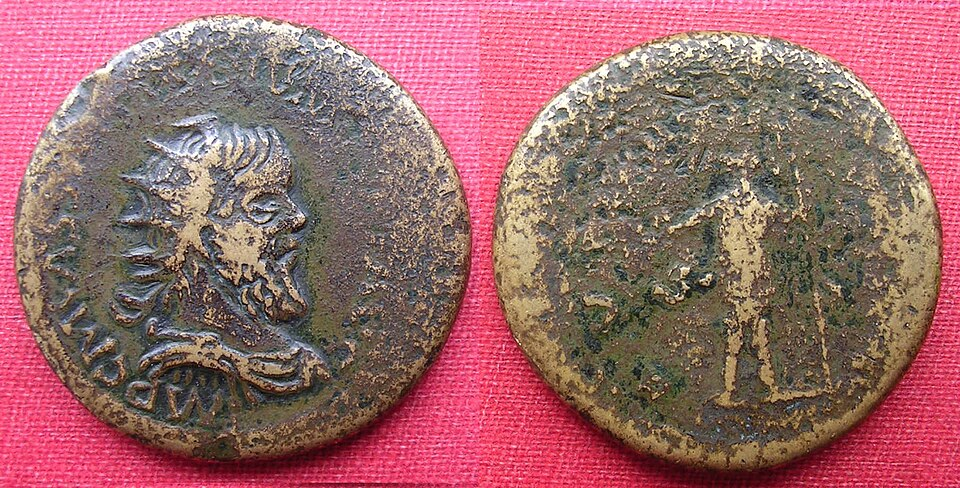
A double sestertius of Postumus (doubled value indicated by the portrait head's radiate crown), made as an overstrike of a much older sestertius, probably of 1st century AD date. It can be seen that the new design does not fill the older coin's face, leaving traces of the original lettering. About 259–268 AD. The coin is 34mm wide.

The double sestertius was a large Roman coin made of orichalcum ("gold-brass") first issued by Emperor Trajan Decius in AD 249–251, as a response to the inflationary pressures of the time which had devalued the buying power of the conventional sestertius. In reality the new coin was little bigger than the traditional sestertius, which by then was being manufactured at a lower weight and smaller size than it had originally been, and was not a success. Although commonly described as a "double" sestertius, it was probably worth only one sestertius and a half.

The new coin fell out of use but was revived by the rebel emperor Postumus (259–268), who ruled a breakaway empire consisting of Britain, Gaul and parts of Germany, and was keen to associate his regime with a reformed coinage system. Postumus issued his own version of the double sestertius, often taking very worn old sestertii and using these to overstrike his own portrait and legends on, probably because of a shortage of metal. The double sestertii were terminated in early 262.

After his reign, the Roman coinage system degenerated further with almost the only circulating pieces being very debased double-denarius coins, known to us as antoniniani or 'radiates' (from the use of the radiate crown). Older coins like the sestertius soon dropped entirely out of use, with many being melted down to create new radiates. By the fourth century AD even these had been discontinued and an entirely new coinage system had been created.
