= Simpulum =

Roman vessel

A simpulum, or simpuvium, was a small vessel or ladle with a long handle from the Roman era, used at sacrifices to make libations, and to taste the wines and other liquors which were poured on the head of the sacrificial victims. The simpulum was the sign of Roman priesthood, and one of the insignia of the College of Pontiffs.

The simpulum appears on a coin from Patras struck under Augustus. It is placed before the head of Vesta, as a mark of that goddess, on a coin of the Domitian family, and is seen in the hand of a Vestal Virgin on coins of the Julio-Claudian dynasty. A man in a toga holds a simpulum in his hand on a coin of Antonio Drusi.

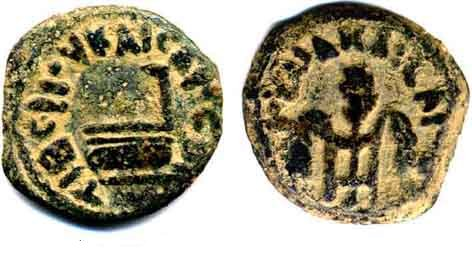
Coin of Pontius Pilate depicting a simpulum and ears of barley

The simpulum is commonly shown with the lituus and other sacrificial and augural instruments, on coins of Julius Caesar, Mark Antony, Marcus Aemilius Lepidus, Augustus, Caligula, Vespasian, Nerva, Antoninus Pius, Marcus Aurelius, Caracalla, Publius Septimius Geta, Volusianus, Saloninus, Valerianus Minor, Domitius Calvinus and Pontius Pilate, as well as on many consular and colonial medals.
