= Victoriatus =

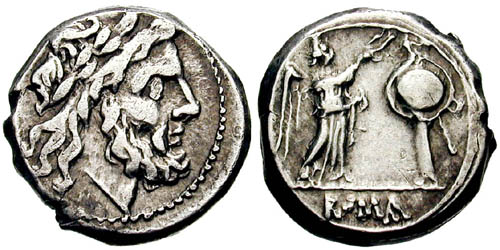
Victoriatus
Iupiter right	Victory placing a wreath upon a trophy; in exergue ROMA.
AR; Crawford 53/1

The victoriatus was a silver coin issued during the Roman Republic from about 221 BC to 170 BC. The obverse of the coin featured the bust of Jupiter and the reverse featured Victory placing a wreath upon a trophy with the inscription "ROMA" in exergue. The name victoriatus is an ancient term, attested by several contemporary texts and inscriptions. The coin was known as a tropaikon (τροπαικον, due to the trophy on the reverse) among Greek speakers.

The coin originally weighed about 3.4 grams (3 scruples), meaning that it was half the value of the quadrigatus, a coin weighing 6 scruples that was by this time no longer produced. The victoriatus was made of a more debased silver than the denarius, which was introduced at about the same time. Hoard evidence indicates that the coin circulated in southern Italy and later Gaul, indicating that the coin was intended as a replacement for the drachma or half-nomos instead of as part of the normal Roman coin system. When first issued the victoriatus had a value of about 3/4 of a denarius, however when the quinarius was reintroduced in 101 BC with a similar type, it was valued at 1/2 a denarius. This indicates that victoriati that were still in circulation at this time were worn and considered to be worth only half a denarius. The reintroduced quinarius was produced mainly for Cisalpine Gaul, where the victoriatus and its imitations were popular. The reintroduced quinarius may have continued to be called a victoriatus, although there is no written evidence of this.

The victoriati abruptly cease to be deposited in Italian hoards in the mid-second century BC, probably indicating that they were officially withdrawn from circulation.

The term victoriatus can still be found today in the family name Vettorato in the province of Venice, or Greekized to Vittoratos / Vitoratos in Kefalonia.

== See also ==
- Roman currency

== Literature ==
- Buttrey, T. V. (1999). "The Content and Meaning of Coin Hoards". Journal of Roman Archaeology. 12: 526–532. doi:10.1017/S1047759400018298.
- Michael Crawford Roman Republican coinage (London: Cambridge University Press, 1974)
- John Melville Jones, A Dictionary of Ancient Roman Coins, London 1990.
