= Itineraries of the Roman emperors, 337–363 =

Travels

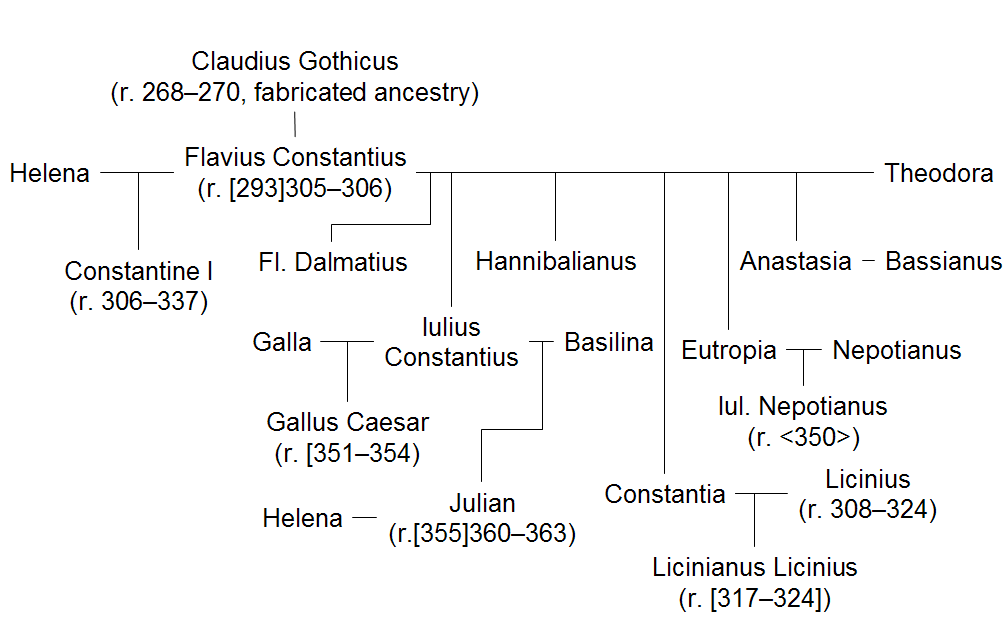
Constantinian family tree, showing Constantius I and his children

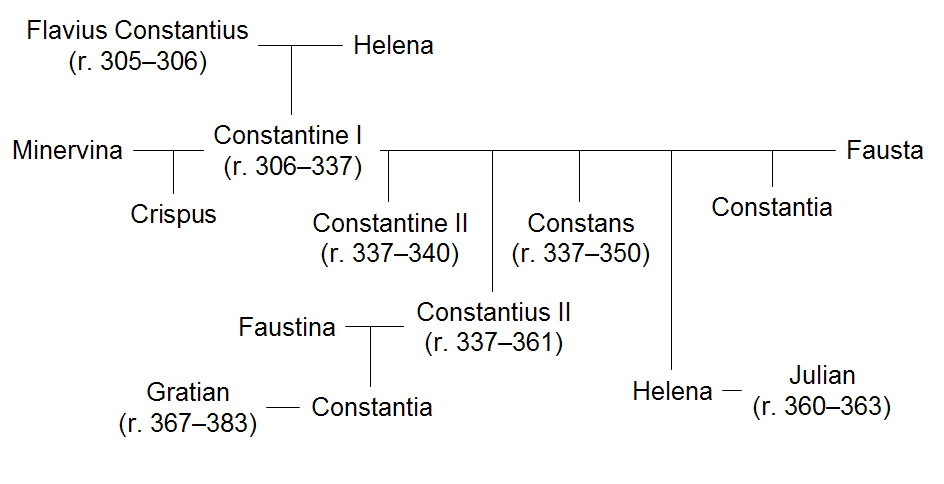
Constantinian family tree, showing Constantine I and his children

The attested movements of the fourth-century Roman emperors encompasses the travels of Constantine II (referred to here as Constantinus), Constantius II ("Constantius"), Constans, Gallus, and Julian the Apostate from 337 to 363 AD. It excludes those of the imperial usurpers of the period, including Magnentius, Vetranio, Claudius Silvanus, and Poemenius. The chronology is principally derived from Timothy Barnes' Athanasius and Constantius. Substantial additions and further sources are based on recent research that seeks to go beyond Barnes' own chronology and slightly modifying his at a few places.

The death of Constantine on 22 May 337 led to an interregnum of three months, during or after which the army and its agents lynched other potential successors, and the three sons of Constantine declared themselves Augusti on 9 September 337. Discarding their father's succession arrangements, the brothers divided the empire into three parts. (Note: The original succession plan would have had Dalmatius rule the dioceses of Thrace, Macedonia, and Hannibalianus rule Armenia and neighboring allied nations. Both were now dead.) Constantine II ruled the provinces of Gaul, Britain, Spain, and Germany from Trier. (Note: Constantinus had ruled from Trier before 337 as well.) Constantius ruled the provinces of Asia Minor (the dioceses of Pontus and Asia), Thrace, the Levant and Egypt (the Diocese of the East) from Antioch. Constans ruled Italy, Africa, and the dioceses of Pannonia, Dacia, and Macedonia from Naissus.

In 340, Constantinus attempted to seize his brother Constans' territory, and was killed while reconnoitering Ravenna during the ensuing civil war. Constans acquired his territory, and ruled from Trier, Milan, and Sirmium. In January 350, Constans was overthrown at Autun and killed at Elne in a palace revolution instigated by Magnentius. Magnentius was defeated and killed in the summer of 353 at the Battle of Mons Seleucus, making Constantius the sole emperor.

From 351 to 359, Constantius ruled from Sirmium and Milan, and from Constantinople and Antioch. Constantius appointed Gallus Caesar (subordinate emperor) on 15 March 351, and delegated the rule of the eastern provinces to him. Gallus ruled from Antioch. He subsequently proved violent and cruel, and was recalled and executed in autumn 354. Constantius appointed Julian, the last surviving male relative of Constantine other than himself, Caesar on 6 November 355. Julian ruled the western provinces from Vienne, Sens, and Paris. To address Persian influence and aggression on the eastern frontier, Constantius ruled from Antioch from 360 until his death.

Julian's troops proclaimed him Augustus in February 360. Constantius did not recognize Julian's claim to the title, but was detained from campaigning against him by Persian raids. Constantius died on 3 November 361 after declaring Julian his successor. Julian was sole emperor from Constantius' death until his own death in 363. Julian's death on 26 June 363 concludes the period.

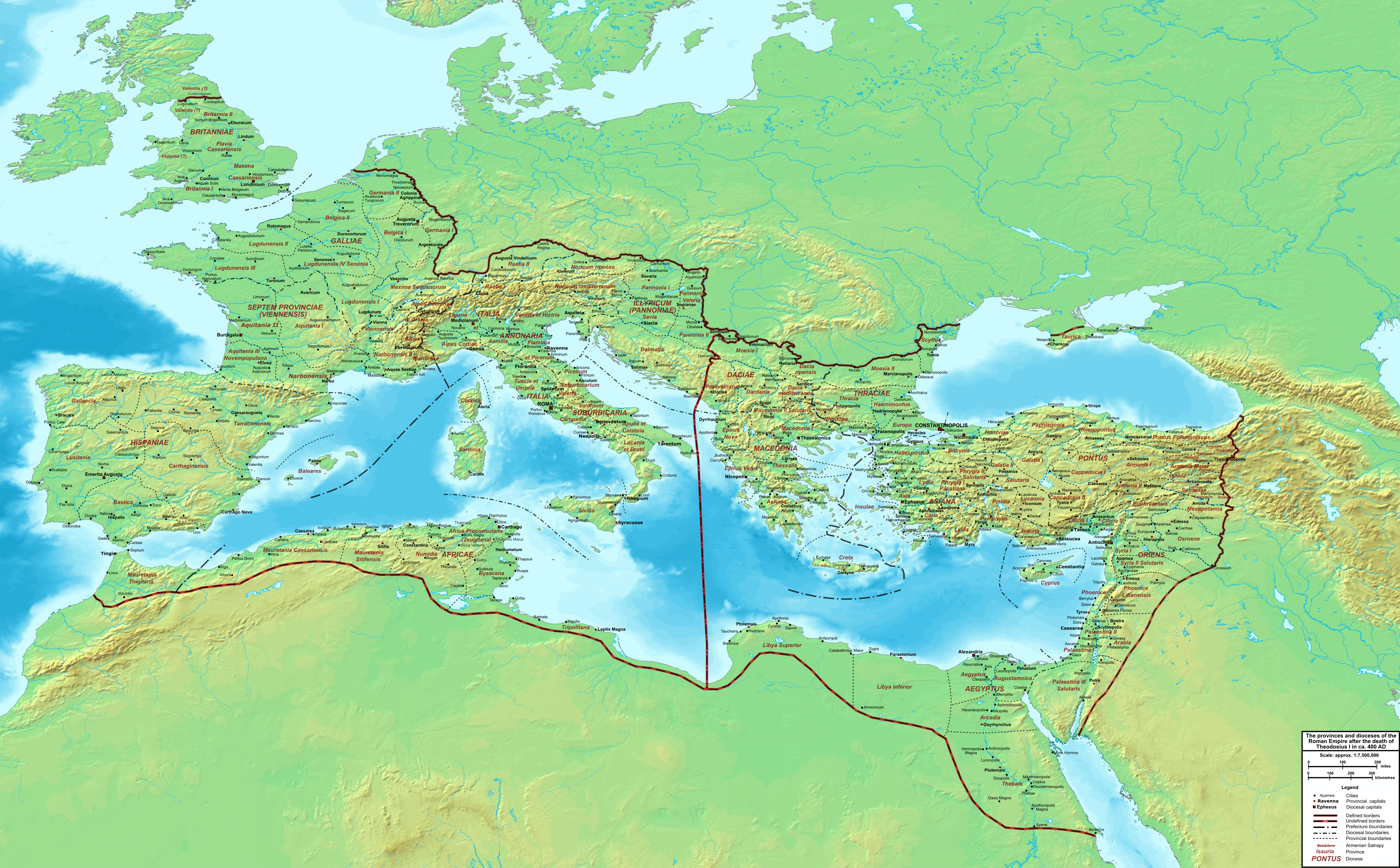
The Roman Empire in c. 400

== Constantinus II ==
Date	Event	Source
337, c. September	Confers with Constantius and Constans in Pannonia	Julian, Oratio 1, 19a, cf. Libanius, Oratio 59.75
338†	Campaigns in Germany	Corpus Inscriptionum Latinarum 3.12483 = Inscriptiones Latinae Selectae 724 + add. (3, p. clxxii); (Note: Constantius' titles in the inscription are Al[aman(nicus) ma]x. G[erm(anicus) max.], whereas he was merely Alaman(nicus) in an inscription dated to c. February 337, implying that he won a victory over the Germans in a campaign in spring 337 or after.) (Troesmis: 337/340)
8 January 339	At Trier† (Note: The Codex Theodosianus 12.1.27 is a constitution addressed to Aurelius Celsinus, proconsul of Africa, which was not formally within Constantinus' dominions, but Constans'. The accuracy of the letter's date has therefore been challenged. Aurelius Celsinus was, however, proconsul of Africa from 337 to 340 (Corpus Inscriptionum Latinarum 8.12272), and so the constitution may thus represent an attempt by Constantinus to assert his self-proclaimed primacy in the imperial college.)	Codex Theodosianus 12.1.27
Late winter 340	Invades the territory of Constans and is killed near Aquileia	Jerome, Chronicon 235^{a}; Chronica minora 1.236; Epitome de Caesaribus 41.21; Socrates, Historia Ecclesiastica 2.5; Zonaras 13.5 (Note: Zosimus (2.41) falsely describes Constans as the aggressor.)

== Constantius II ==
Date	Event	Source
July† 337 (Note: Barnes elsewhere dates this event—Athanasius' meeting with Constantius—to c. August. After the meeting, Athanasius left Viminacium and traveled to Alexandria by way of Constantinople. He arrived on 23 November 337.)	At Viminacium	Athanasius, Apologia ad Constantium 5.2
August/September† 337	Campaigns against the Sarmatae	Corpus Inscriptionum Latinarum 3.12483 (Note: The inscription, dated to 340, shows that Constantius took the title Sarmaticus at some time between 337 and that year.)
337, c. September	Confers with Constantinus and Constans in Pannonia	Julian, Oratio 1.19a, cf. Libanius Orationes 59.75 (Note: Jean-Paul Callu dates the meeting between Constantius and Constans to which Libanius refers to 340, after Constantinus' death, since Libanius is otherwise silent on the "triarchic period".)
September† 337	Returns to Constantinople	Socrates, Historia Ecclesiastica 2.7
November† 337 (Note: Barnes' earlier date for this event was "337, late".)	Returns to Antioch for the winter	Socrates, Historia Ecclesiastica 2.7, cf. Libanius Orationes 59.75, 66
Spring 338 (Note: Barnes was less confident about this dating in his "Imperial Chronology", where it was marked with a "?". Barnes argues for the spring dating, without confirmatory data, on the basis of the itineraries of Athanasius and Constantius in this period.)	At Caesarea in Cappadocia	Athanasius, Apologia ad Constantium 5.2
Spring 338	Restores Arsaces to the throne of Armenia	Julian, Oratio 1.20d–21a, cf. Libanius, Oratio 59,76–80
11 October 338	At Antioch	Codex Theodosianus 12.1.23
28 October 338	At Emesa	Codex Theodosianus 12.1.25
27 December 338	At Antioch	Codex Theodosianus 2.6.4
339, c. January	At Antioch	Athanasius, Epistula encyclica 2.1; Historia Arianorum 10.1
339 or 340	At Hierapolis (Note: Barnes states that the Hierapolis referred to is Hierapolis in Syria.)	Papyri Abinnaeus 1.8–10 (Note: According to his papers, Abinnaeus visited the imperial court at Hierapolis with recruits from the Thebaid. The meeting occurred between two events whose date is known: on the one hand, Abinnaeus' earlier travels with the Blemmyes from Egypt's southern border to the Bosphorus, and, on the other, his command at Dionysias. Abinnaeus is attested at Dionysias from 29 March 342. Barnes, from Eusebius' Vita Constantini, deduces that the trip to Constantinople with the Blemmyes occurred in the summer of 336. Since Constantius' precise whereabouts are not known for any point between 27 December 338 and 12 August 340, Barnes dates the emperor's meeting with Abinnaeus to this period.)
Summer 340	Invades Persian territory	Itinerarium Alexandri, pr. 1, cf. 4
12 August 340	At Edessa (Note: Barnes was less confident about this identification in his "Imperial Chronology," where it was written as "Edessa?".)	Codex Theodosianus 12.1.30^{S} (place of issue transmitted as Bessae)
9 September 340	At Antioch	Codex Theodosianus 6.4.5/6
6 January 341	Attends the 'Dedication Council' at Antioch (Note: Barnes cites W. Elteser, Zeitschrift für die neutestamentliche Wissenschaft und die Kunde der alten Kirche 36 (1937) 254f. on the date; E. Schwartz, Zeitschrift für die neutestamentliche Wissenschaft und die Kunde der alten Kirche 34 (1935) 142, had dated the council to autumn 341.)	Athanasius, de Synodis 25.1; Philostorgius p. 212.19–22 Bidez
12 February 341	At Antioch	Codex Theodosianus 5.13.1/2
341/2	Winters in Antioch	Socrates, Historia Ecclesiastica 2.13.5, cf. Jerome Chronicon 235^{f}; Chronica minora 1.236
Early 342	Visits Constantinople to expel the bishop Paul and returns to Antioch immediately after	Libanius, Oratio 59.94–97; Socrates, Historia Ecclesiastica 2.13.7, cf. Jerome Chronicon 235^{f}; Chronica minora 1.236
31 March – 11 May 342	In Antioch	Codex Theodosianus 3.12.1; 12.1.33/4 (5, 8 April); 11.36.6
18 February 343	At Antioch	Codex Theodosianus 9.21.5
9 June – 4 July 343	In Hierapolis	Codex Theodosianus 8.1.1 (319 mss.); 12.1.35 (27 June); 15.8.1
Summer/autumn 343	Wins a victory over the Persians	Athanasius, Historia Arianorum 16.2, cf. Festus, Breviarium 27
October/November 343	Visits Constantinople†	
344, c. April	At Antioch	Theodoret, Historia Ecclesiastica 2.8.56, 9.9–10, cf. Athanasius, Historia Arianorum 20.5
Summer 344†	Defeats the Persians near Singara	Julian, Oratio 1, 26a; Libanius, Oratio 59.88, 99–120; Jerome, Chronicon 236^{l}; Chronica minora 1.236 (both Jerome and the Chronica minora give the date as 348), cf. Festus, Breviarium 27
345	At Nisibis	Codex Theodosianus 11.7.5, cf. Ephraem, Carmina Nisibena 13.4–6, 14/5
Summer 345	At Edessa	Athanasius, Apologia contra Arianos 51.6
21 March 346	At Antioch	Codex Theodosianus 10.14.1^{S} (315 mss.)
346, c. September	At Antioch	Athanasius, Apologia ad Constantium 5.2; Historia Arianorum 44.5, Historia acephala 1.2; Festal Index 17; Jerome, Chronicon 236^{e}
8 March 347	At Ancyra	Codex Theodosianus 11.36.8
347†, spring (Note: A date of c. 350 is also possible. Like most contemporary panegyrics, the Oratio 1 makes few overt references to political events. Richard Foerster, the compiler of the modern edition of Libanius' works, Libanii Opera (1903), argued for a date in the 340s on the belief that Libanius wrote his Oratio 59 after seeing Themistius' speech. Foerster dated Oratio 59 to 348/9, a dating most scholars have since followed. Foerster adduced the attestation at Ancyra (where the speech was known to have been delivered) in the Codex Theodosianus 11.36.8 (see entry above) in favor of a 347 date. In response to Foerter's view, Otto Seeck argued that since Constans is not mentioned, it must have been delivered after his death. The attestation in the Codex Theodosianus was not decisive, since Constantius would have passed Ancyra whenever he traveled through Asia Minor. Given that the only other date Constantius could have traveled along this path was in the Autumn of 350, Seeck held that to be the only other plausible dating. Most twentieth-century scholars followed Seeck. Barnes and the scholar John Vanderspoel take the 347 date. Although Barnes considers Foerster's premise on Themistius' influence on Libanius "erroneous", the absence of any remarks on the usurpations in the west makes a 350 dating untenable. Vanderspoel argues that Themistius' allusion to the destruction of the Persian king by "the virtue of the emperor shining nearby", when compared with the catalog of Roman victories against the Persians that occurred while Constantius was merely nearby, and not personally involved, points to a date between the two sieges of Singara in 346 and 348.)	Themistius delivers an imperial panegyric before Constantius at Ancyra (Note: Callu, following H. Scholze, has noted that the localization in Ancyra is given only in the title of the oration, and is thus of dubious value.)	Themistius, Oratio 1
11 May 347	At Hierapolis†	Codex Theodosianus 5.6.1
348†, summer	Engages the Persians in battle near Singara	Festus, Breviarium 27
1 April 349	At Antioch	Codex Theodosianus 12.1.39
Summer 349	At Singara, then Emesa	Athanasius, Historia Arianorum 7.3
3 October 349	At Constantinople†	Codex Theodosianus 12.2.1 +15.1.6
Spring 350	At Edessa	Philostorgius, Historia Ecclesiastica 3.22
Summer 350	At Antioch while Shapur II besieges Nisibis	Theodoret, Historia Ecclesiastica 2.30.1, 9/10, 31.1
Summer 350	Visits Nisibis after the siege	Zonaras 13.7
Autumn 350	Leaves Antioch heading west	Philostorgius, p. 215.22–24 Bidez
Autumn 350	Travels via Heraclea to Serdica	Zonaras 13.7
25 December 350	Engineers the abdication of Vetranio at Naissus	Jerome, Chronicon 238^{c} (place and year); Chronica minora 1.238 (day, year falsely given as 351); Zosimus 2.44.3/4
15 March 351	Proclaims Gallus Caesar at Sirmium	Chronica minora 1.238
Summer and autumn 351	In Sirmium before and during the campaign against Magnentius	Sulpicius Severus, Chron. 2.38.5–7; Socrates, Historia Ecclesiastica 2.28.23; Zosimus 2.45.3, 48.3
351, October†	Present at the Second Council of Sirmium which deposed Photinus	Socrates, Historia Ecclesiastica 2.28.23, 29.1
26 February 352	At Sirmium	Codex Justinianus 6.22.5
12 May 352	At Sirmium	Codex Theodosianus 3.5.1^{S} (319 mss.)
Summer 352	Campaign against the Sarmatae†	
352, September†	Enters Italy	Chronica minora 1.67 (Note: Naeratius Cerealis became praefectus urbi on 27 September 352. Constantius would have been in attendance.)
3 November 352	At Milan	Codex Theodosianus 15.14.5
Spring–summer 353	In Milan	Historia acephala 1.7, cf. Festal Index 25; Codex Theodosianus 11.1.6 + 12.1.42 (22 May: year emended from 354), 16.8.7^{S} (3 July: 357 mss.)
353, c. October – 354, Spring	Winters in Arles	Ammianus 14.5.1; Codex Theodosianus 8.7.2^{S} (3 November: 326 mss.); Ammianus 14.10.1
Spring 354	At Valentia	Ammianus 14.10.1/2
Spring 354	Crosses the Rhine at Rauracum	Ammianus 14.10.6
Autumn 354 – spring 355	Winters in Milan	Ammianus 14.10.16; Codex Theodosianus 11.34.2 (1 January); Codex Justinianus 6.22.6 (18 February)
355, c. June	Conducts expedition into Raetia	Ammianus 15.4.1
355, c. June	Goes to winter quarters in Milan	Ammianus 15.4.13, cf. Sulpicius Severus, Chron. 2.39.3, 8 (Council of Milan)
6 July 355 – 5 July 356	In Milan	Codex Theodosianus 14.3.2; Codex Theodosianus 12.1.43 (17 July 355); 1.5.5 (18 July 355); 6.29.1 (22 July 355); 12.12.1 (1 August 355); 9.34.6 (31 October 355); 16.10.6 (19 February 356); 9.42.2 (8 March 356); 11.16.8^{S} (1 April 356: 357 mss.); 11.16.7 (2 April 356); 6.4.8–10 (11 April 356); 6.29.2^{S} (17 April 356: 357 mss.); 13.10.3^{S} (29 April 356: 357 mss.); 9.17.4^{S} = Codex Justinianus 9.19.4^{S} (13 June 356: 357 mss.); Codex Theodosianus 8.5.8^{S} (24 June 356: 357 mss.); 1.2.7 (5 July 356)
6 November 355	Proclaims Julian Caesar at Milan	Ammianus 15.8.17; Chronica minora 1.238; Corpus Inscriptionum Latinarum 1^{2}, p. 277; Socrates, Historia Ecclesiastica 2.34.5
1 December 355	Escorts Julian out of Milan, then returns to the city	Ammianus 15.8.18
Summer and autumn 356	Campaigns against the Alamanni on the Upper Rhine	Ammianus 16.12.15/6
25 July 356	At Messadensis (Note: Messadensis is otherwise unknown.)	Codex Theodosianus 11.30.25^{S} (355 mss.)
2 September 356	At Dinumma (Note: Dinumma is otherwise unknown.)	Codex Theodosianus 11.7.8^{S} (355 mss.)
10 November 356 – 19 March 357	In Milan	Codex Theodosianus 16.2.13^{S} (357 mss.); 9.16.5^{S} (4 December 356: 357 mss.); 8.7.7^{S} (27 December: a date in 357 is implied); 12.12.2 (15 January 357); 9.17.4 (15 January 357: 'id.Iun.' mss.); 9.16.4 (25 January 357); 15.1.1^{S} (2 February 357: 320 mss.); 10.20.2^{S} (358 mss.)
28 April 357	Enters Rome	Chronica minora 1.239
28 April – 29 May 357	In Rome	Ammianus 16.10.20 (length of stay); Codex Theodosianus 8.1.5 (6 May 357); 10.1.2^{S} (17 May 357: 319 mss.)
7 or 10 June 357	At Helvillum (Note: The manuscripts record both Haerbillio and Med[iolani]. Mommsen (in his edition of the Codex Theodosianus at 1.5.6 + 7) identified the location as Helvillum on the Via Flaminia between Spoletium and Ariminum.)	Codex Theodosianus 1.5.6 + 7
5 July 357	At Ariminum	Codex Theodosianus 9.16.6^{S} (358 mss.)
21 July 357	At Ravenna	Codex Theodosianus 12.1.40^{S} (353 mss.)
21 July 357	Passes through Tridentum on the way to the Danube	Ammianus 16.10.20
21 July 357	Visits Pannonia and Moesia	Zosimus 3.2.2; Julian, Epistula ad SPQ Atheniarum 279^{d}
October 357 – 3 March 358	Winters in Sirmium	Ammianus 16.10.21; 17.12.1; Codex Theodosianus 8.5.10 (27 October 357: transmitted year either 357 or 358); 1.15.3^{S} (3 December 357: 353 mss.); 7.4.3, 11.30.27 (18 December 357); 2.21.2^{S} (18 December 357: 360 mss.); 9.42.4 (4 January 357); Codex Justinianus 3.26.8
April 358	Invades the territory of the Sarmatae Limigantes	Ammianus 17.12.4–6
April 358	Returns in triumph to Sirmium	Ammianus 13.3.33
21–23 June 358	In Sirmium	Codex Theodosianus 12.1.44 + 45 (21 June 358); 8.13.4, 11.36.13 (23 June 358)
27 June 358	At Mursa	Codex Theodosianus 12.1.46
358, c. October – 359, c. March	Winters in Sirmium	Ammianus 18.4.1; 19.11.1; Codex Theodosianus 2.21.1 (19 December 358)
Spring 359	Begins a campaign against the Sarmatae	Ammianus 19.11.2
Spring 359	In the province of Valeria	Ammianus 19.11.4
Spring 359	Defeats the Limigantes near Acimincum	Ammianus 19.11.5–16
Spring 359	Returns to Sirmium	Ammianus 19.11.17
22 May 359	At Sirmium	Codex Theodosianus 6.4.14 + 15; Athanasius, de Synodicus 8.3; Socrates, Historia Ecclesiastica 2.37.18
28 May 359	At Sirmium	Codex Theodosianus 1.7.1
18 June 359	At Singidunum	Codex Theodosianus 11.30.28
†	At Adrianople†	Athanasius, de Synodicus 55.2/3 (implies intent to visit)
Autumn 359	Goes to Constantinople for the winter	Ammianus 19.11.17; 20.8.1; Socrates, Historia Ecclesiastica 2.41.1; Sozomen, Historia Ecclesiastica 4.23.3, cf. Chronica minora 1.239 (implies Constantius' presence in Constantinople before 11 December 359)
December 359 – March 360	In Constantinople	Sozomen, Historia Ecclesiastica 4.23.4–7 (late December 359 – 1 January 360); Hilary, Ad Constantium 2.2 (Corpus Scriptorum Ecclesiasticorum Latinorum 65.198.9/10), cf. Jerome, de Virus Illustribus 100; Codex Theodosianus 4.13.4^{S}; 11.36.10^{S} (18 January 360: 356 and 354 mss.); 11.24.1 (4 February 360); 14.1.1^{S} (24 February 360: 357 mss.); 7.4.5^{S} (14 March 360: 359 mss.)
360, March†	At Caesarea in Cappadocia, receiving news that Julian has been proclaimed Augustus	Ammianus 20.9.1
360, March†	Travels via Melitene, Lacotena, and Samosata to Edessa	Ammianus 20.11.4
After 21 September 360	Leaves Edessa	Ammianus 20.11.4
After 21 September 360	Visits Amida	Ammianus 20.11.4/5
After 21 September 360	Besieges Bezabde	Ammianus 20.11.6–31
17 December 360	At Hierapolis	Codex Theodosianus 7.4.6^{S} (17 May mss.)
Late December 360 – 361, c. March	Winters in Antioch	Ammianus 20.11.32; Codex Theodosianus 16.2.16 (14 February 361); Socrates, Historia Ecclesiastica 2.45.10
3 May 361	At Gephyra	Codex Theodosianus 1.6.1, 28.1; 6.4.12, 13; 7.8.1; 11.1.7, 15.1, 23.1; 12.1.48; 13.1.3; 15.1.7 (all extracts from the same law)
29 May 361	At Doliche	Codex Theodosianus 7.4.4^{S} (358 mss.: place of issue written as Doridae)
29 May 361	Crosses the Euphrates at Capersana, goes to Edessa, and later returns to Hierapolis (or perhaps Nicopolis)	Ammianus 21.7.7, 13.8
Autumn 361	Briefly returns to Antioch	Ammianus 21.15.1/2
October 361	At Hippocephalus	Ammianus 21.15.2
October 361	Falls ill at Tarsus	Ammianus 21.15.2
3 November 361	Dies at Mopsucrenae in Cilicia	Jerome, Chronicon 242^{b}; Ammianus 21.15.3 (date emended from 5 October); Chronica minora 1.240; Socrates, Historia Ecclesiastica 2.47.4; 3.1.1

== Constans ==
Date	Event	Source
337, c. September	Confers with Constantinus and Constantius in Pannonia	Julian, Oratio 1, 19a, cf. Libanius, Oratio 59.75
6 December 337	At Thessalonica	Codex Theodosianus 11.1.4; 11.7.8^{S} (353 mss.)
338/346 (Note: The Prosopography of the Later Roman Empire, following Gothofredus and Mommsen, emends the year to 346.)	Campaign against the Sarmatae	Corpus Incriptionum Latinarum 3.12483
12 June 338	At Viminacium	Codex Theodosianus 10.10.4
27 July 338	At Sirmium	Codex Theodosianus 15.1.5; Codex Justinianus 10.48.7
339†, 6 April	At Savaria	Codex Theodosianus 10.10.6^{S} (342 mss.)
19 January 340 – 2 February 340	At Naissus	Codex Theodosianus 12.1.29; 10.10.5
19 January 340 – 2 February 340	Hears of Constantinus' invasion of his territory while in Dacia	Zonaras 13.5
9 April 340	At Aquileia	Codex Theodosianus 2.6.5; 10.15.3
25 June 340	At Milan	Codex Theodosianus 9.17.1
340†	Visits Rome†	Passio Artemii 9 = Philostorgius, Historia Ecclesiastica 3.1^{A}
24 June 341	At Lauriacum	Codex Theodosianus 8.2.1 = 12.1.31
Late 341	Campaigns against the Franci in Gaul	Jerome, Chronicon 235^{b}; Chronica minora 1.236
342	Wins a victory over the Franci and signs a treaty with them	Libanius, Oratio 59.127–136; Jerome, Chronicon 235^{e}; Chronica minora 1.236; Socrates, Historia Ecclesiastica 2.13.4
Summer 342	In Trier	Socrates, Historia Ecclesiastica 2.18
Autumn 342	Interviews Athanasius in Milan	Athanasius, Apologia ad Constantium 4.3
4 December 342	At Milan	Codex Theodosianus 9.7.3
25 January 343	At Bononia	Codex Theodosianus 11.16.5, cf. Codex Justinianus 3.26.6
25 January 343	Crosses to Britain in winter	Firmicus Maternus, De errore profanarum religionum 28.6; Libanius, Oratio 59.137–140; Ammianus 20.1.1
Spring 343	Returns from Britain to Gaul soon after his departure	Libanius, Oratio 59.139, 141
30 June 343	At Trier	Codex Theodosianus 12.1.36
Summer 343	Interviews Athanasius in Trier	Athanasius, Apologia ad Constantium 4.4, cf. 3.7
Autumn 344	In Pannonia	Libanius, Oratio 59.133
Early 345	Receives an embassy from Constantius at Poetovio	Athanasius, Apologia ad Constantium 3.3
7 April 345	At Aquileia at Easter, where he interviews Athanasius	Athanasius, Apologia ad Constantium 15.4, cf. 3.7; Festal Index 17
15 May 345	At Trier	Codex Theodosianus 10.10.7
9 June or 11 July 345	At Cologne	Codex Theodosianus 3.5.7
Autumn† 345	Interviews Athanasius in Trier	Athanasius, Apologia ad Constantium 4.5, cf. 3.7
346†, 5 March	At Sirmium	Codex Theodosianus 10.10.8^{S} (353 mss.)
23 May 346	At Caesena	Codex Theodosianus 12.1.38
17 June 348	At Milan	Codex Theodosianus 10.14.2
27 May 349	At Sirmium	Codex Theodosianus 7.1.2 + 8.7.3
350, shortly after 18 January	Killed at Helena in Gaul	Eutropius, Breviarium 10.9.4; Jerome, Chronicon 237^{c}; Chronica minora 1.237; Epitome de Caesaribus 41.23; Zosimus 2.42.5

== Gallus ==
Date	Event	Source
15 March 351	Proclaimed Caesar at Sirmium	Chronica minora 1.238 (day); Passio Artemii 12 = Philostorgius, Historia Ecclesiastica 3.26^{a}
7 May 351	Reaches Antioch	Socrates, Historia Ecclesiastica 2.28.22
7 May 351	Campaigns in Mesopotamia†	Philostorgius, Historia Ecclesiastica 3.28
Summer 352	Suppresses a Jewish rebellion in Galilee	Jerome, Chronicon 238^{f}
Late summer 353 – spring 354	At Antioch	Ammianus 14.1.4–9, 7.1–4
354, c. March	Visits Hierapolis	Ammianus 14.7.5
354, c. 1 September	Leaves Antioch	Ammianus 14.11.12
14–30 September 354	At Nicomedia†	Papyri Laurentius 169 (consular date of 354 restored)
14–30 September 354	Stripped of his imperial rank at Poetovio	Ammianus 14.11.19/20
October 354	Tried and executed near Pola	Ammianus 14.11.20–30

== Julian ==
Date	Event	Source
6 November 355	Proclaimed Caesar at Milan	Ammianus 15.8.7; Corpus Inscriptionum Latinarum 1^{2}, p. 277; Chronica minora 1.238; Socrates, Historia Ecclesiastica 2.34.5
6–30 November 355	At Milan	Ammianus 15.8.18
1 December 355	Leaves Milan	Ammianus 15.8.18
1 December 355	Travels via Turin to Vienne	Ammianus 15.8.18–21
December 355 – spring 356	At Vienne	Ammianus 16.1.1, 2.1
April/May 356	Present at the Council of Baeterrae†	Hilary, Ad Constantium 2 (Corpus Scriptorum Ecclesiasticorum Latinorum 65.198.5–15)
24 June 356	Reaches Autun	Ammianus 16.2.2
24 June 356	Passes through Auxerre	Ammianus 16.2.5
24 June 356	Advances via Troyes, Reims, Decem Pagi, Brotomagus	Ammianus 16.2.6–8
356, c. August	Recaptures Cologne	Ammianus 16.3.1/2, cf. Julian, Epistula ad SPQ Atheniarum 279b
356, c. August	Visits Trier	Ammianus 16.3.3
356/7	Winters at Sens	Ammianus 16.3.3, 7.1, 11.1
Spring 357	Goes to Reims	Ammianus 16.11.1
Spring 357	Marches toward Strasbourg and wins a victory over the Alamanni	Ammianus 16.11.8–12.67
Spring 357	Returns to Tres Tabernae	Ammianus 17.1.1
Spring 357	Goes to Mainz	Ammianus 17.1.2
Spring 357	Conducts raid across the Rhine	Ammianus 17.1.2/3
December 357 – January 358	Besieges barbarians at a fortified town on the Meuse for 54 days	Ammianus 17.2.2/3
January–July 358	Winters in Paris	Ammianus 17.2.4, 8.1
July–autumn 358	Campaigns against the Salian Franci in Toxandria	Ammianus 17.8.3–10.10
1 January 359	In winter quarters at Paris	Ammianus 18.1.1
1 January 359	Strengthens the Rhine frontier from Castra Herculis to Bingen	Ammianus 18.2.4
1 January 359	Crosses the Rhine from Mainz and conducts a raid into German territory	Ammianus 18.2.7–19
1 January 360	In winter quarters at Paris	Ammianus 20.1.1
360, February†	Proclaimed Augustus at Paris	Julian, Epistula ad SPQ Atheniarum 283a–285a; Ammianus 20.4.4–22; Zosimus 3.9.1–3
Summer 360	Crosses the Rhine at Tricesima and attacks the Franci Attuarii	Ammianus 20.10.1/2
Autumn 360	Marches up the left bank of the Rhine to Rauracum, then via Besançon to Vienne	Ammianus 20.10.3
6 November 360 – 361, c. March	Winters at Vienne	Ammianus 20.10.3; 21.1 (6 November 360); 21.2.5 (6 January 361), 3.1
Spring 361	Attacks Germans, crosses the Rhine, and goes to Rauracum	Ammianus 21.3.3–4.8, 8.1
Spring 361	Leaves Rauracum, advances up the Rhine, then down the Danube	Ammianus 21.8.1–10.2
Mid-July 361	Continues advancing down the Danube via Sirmium as far as the Pass of Succi	Ammianus 21.8.1–10.2
Mid-July 361	Returns to Naissus	Ammianus 21.20.5
Mid-July 361	At Naissus	Ammianus 21.12.1; Zosimus 3.11.2
Mid-July 361	After receiving news of Constantius' death, leaves Naissus and travels via Philippopolis and Heraclea/Perinthus to Constantinople	Ammianus 21.12.3; 22.2
11 December 361	Enters Constantinople	Ammianus 22.2.4; Chronica minora 1.240; Socrates, Historia Ecclesiastica 3.1.2
c. May 362	Sets out for Antioch	Ammianus 22.9.2
Winter 362	Julian winters at Antioch, planning the campaign on the Sassanian front	Ammianus 23.2.6
March 5 363	Julian sets out on his campaign from Antioch, makes it to Hierapolis in his first stage	Ammianus 23.2.6
March 27 363	Julian arrives in Kallinikos	Ammianus 23.3.7
Beginning of April 363	Julian enters Kirkesion	Ammianus 23.5.1
April to June 26 363	Julian continues his campaign eastward, until he dies on the battlefield on 26 June 363	Ammianus 25.3.21, 22
