= Battle of Mursa =

Battle of Mursa can refer to either of two Roman battles at Mursa:

- Battle of Mursa (c. 258/260 CE), between Gallienus and the usurper Ingenuus. Ingenuus' troops were defeated, as Gallienus' general Aureolus adequately used the advantage given by the mobility of an improved cavalry component of the army (a remarkable military innovation of Gallienus's), and the usurper was killed in battle, or took his own life to avoid capture.
- Battle of Mursa Major (351 CE), between Constantius II and Magnentius
