= Bonitus =

Bonit or Bonitus may refer to:

- Bonitus (magister militum), 4th century Frankish general
- Bonitus (abbot) (died c. 584), abbot of Monte Cassino
- Bonitus (bishop) (623–710), 7th century Frankish bishop
