= Poemenius (usurper) =

Roman usurper against Magnentius

- Usurper of the Roman Empire
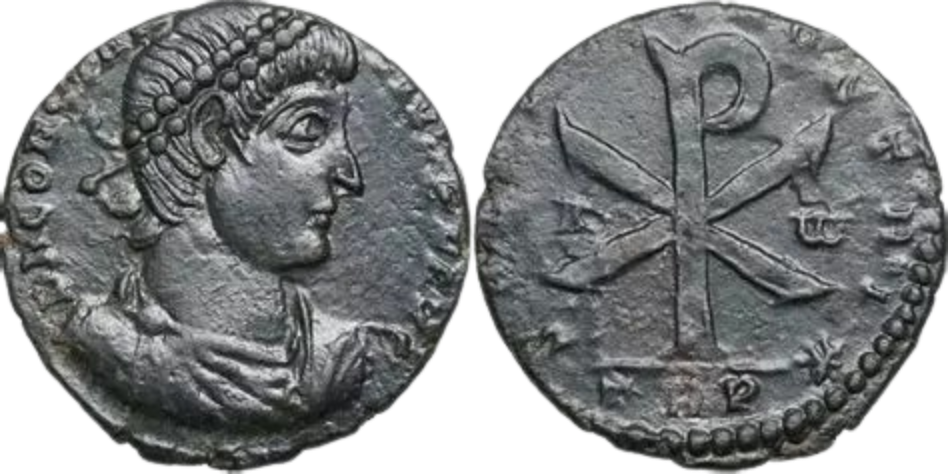
- Coin of Poemenius in the name of Constantius II, dated 353 AD with the inscription "SALVS AVG NOSTRI", reverse type depicting a large Chi-rho monogram and minted in Trier.
- Reign: around spring 353 (against Magnentius)
- Predecessor: Magnentius
- Successor: Constantius II
- Died: 355

Poemenius (died c. 355) was a Roman officer who seized control of Trier in 353 in support of Constantius II and in opposition to the usurper Magnentius.

== Biography ==
Poemenius was a Roman officer of Late Antiquity. According to Ammianus Marcellinus (15.6.4), he was chosen by the inhabitants of Augusta Treverorum (modern-day Trier) as a defender against Decentius, brother of the usurper Magnentius.

According to this source, Poemenius closed the gates of Trier to Caesar Magnus Decentius. Since this part of the Roman Empire was under Magnentius's control, this was a revolt against a rival emperor, and Poemenius sided with the legitimate emperor Constantius II.

Indeed, when Magnus Decentius failed to contain a Frankish invasion, which, at the behest of Constantius II, attacked the Rhine frontier to divide the army of the two usurpers, he was defeated at the Battle of Mons Seleucus (present-day La Bâtie-Montsaléon in the Hautes-Alpes). He went to Trier, but was refused entry. He then took refuge in Sens and, upon learning of the defeat and the suicide of his brother in Lugdunum (Lyon), hanged himself on August 18.

== Death ==
Ammianus Marcellinus reports that Poemenius was executed in 355 after Sylvanus' failed usurpation
