= Jewish revolt against Constantius Gallus =

Revolt against Rome (351–352)

Jewish revolt against Gallus
- Part of the Roman civil war of 350–353
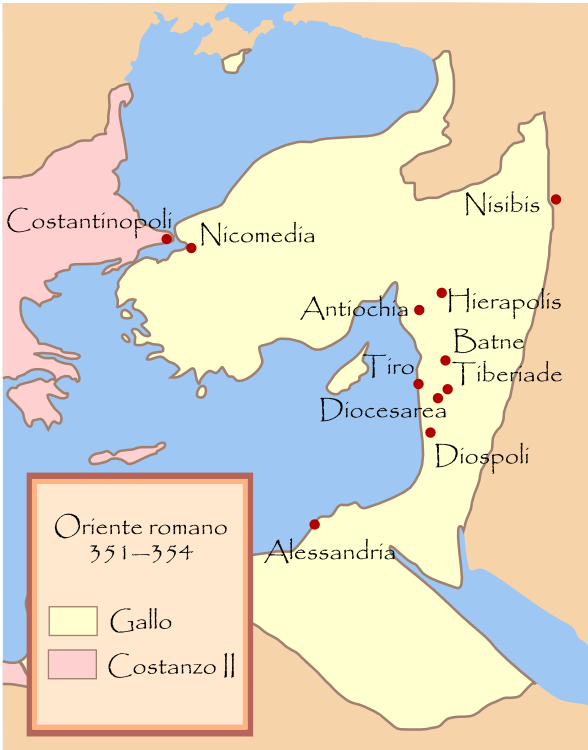
- Map of the Roman East under Gallus
Date	351–352 AD
Location	Syria Palaestina
Result	Roman victory; Destruction of several cities

Belligerents
Roman Empire	Jews of Syria Palaestina

Commanders and leaders
Constantius Gallus; Ursicinus	Isaac of Diocesarea †; Patricius †

Casualties and losses
5,000	Several thousand rebels killed

In 351–352, the Jews of the Roman province of Syria Palaestina revolted against the rule of Constantius Gallus, brother-in-law of Emperor Constantius II and caesar of the eastern part of the Roman Empire. The revolt, which occurred during the Roman civil war of 350–353, was crushed by Gallus' general Ursicinus.

The rebellion was led by Isaac of Diocaesarea (also known as Isaac of Sepphoris), aided by a certain Patricius and had its epicentre in the town of Diocaesarea (the Greco-Roman referent for Sepphoris). Jerome records that the revolt began with a night attack on the Roman garrison, which was destroyed, and allowed the Jews to procure the necessary weapons. According to the 9th-century author Theophanes the Confessor, the rebels subsequently killed the people of different ethnicities, pagan Greek Hellenes and Samaritans.

== Background ==
Following the suppression of the Bar Kokhba revolt in 136 CE, the demographic and spiritual center of Jewish life in the region shifted from Jerusalem to the Galilee. The city of Diocaesarea (Sepphoris) grew in prominence during this period, eventually serving as a primary seat for the Sanhedrin, the supreme Jewish rabbinical court.

The emperor Constantius II, like his father Constantine the Great before him, showed a preference for the Christian religion, which he favored over all others, including Judaism. Unlike his father, however, Constantius allowed Christians to persecute the pagans and the Jews. Some Christian clergy practiced intolerance toward non-Christians, both through the secular arm and in directing angry crowds, which attacked and destroyed synagogues and temples.

Eventually, the Jews reacted, opposing Christian proselytism and showing intolerance toward Jewish Christians. Fiery sermons preached in synagogues against Edom were in fact directed against those Romans who, after removing the Jews' political independence, were now repressing their religion.

== Revolt ==
=== Roman Civil War ===
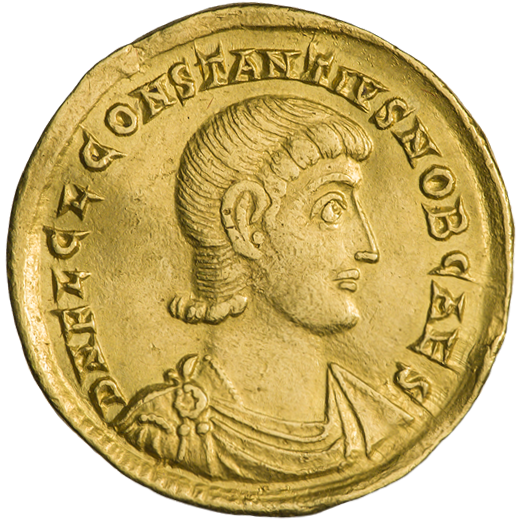
Solidus of Constantius Gallus

In 350, Emperor Constantius II was engaged in a campaign in the East against the Sasanians. He was however forced to return to the West to counter the usurpation of Magnentius, who had murdered Constantius' brother and colleague, Constans. Constantius therefore appointed his cousin Gallus Caesar of the East, on March 15, 351 at Sirmium. Gallus arrived at Antioch, (Note: 36°12′N 36°09′E) his capital, on May 7 of that same year. During the period between the passage of Constantius in the West and the arrival of Gallus in the East, or immediately after the arrival of the Caesar in Antioch, the Jews revolted in Palestine.

=== Hostilities in Galilee ===
The rebellion was led by Isaac of Diocaesarea (also known as Isaac of Sepphoris), aided by a certain Patricius, also known as Natrona, a name with messianic connotations, and had its epicentre in the town of Diocaesarea (the Greco-Roman referent for Sepphoris). (Note: 32°45′8″N 35°16′52″E) Jerome records that the revolt began with a night assault on the Roman garrison, which was destroyed, and allowed the Jews to procure the necessary weapons. According to the 9th century author Theophanes the Confessor subsequently the rebels killed the people of different ethnicities, pagan Greek Hellenes and Samaritans. He is the first author to make this claim.

=== Ursicinus' campaign ===
In 351 or 352, Gallus sent his magister equitum Ursicinus to forcefully put down the revolt. Tiberias (Note: 32°47′23″N 35°31′29″E) and Diospolis, (Note: 31°56′55″N 34°53′20″E) two of the cities conquered by the rebels, were almost destroyed, while Diocaesarea was razed to the ground. Ursicinus also ordered several thousand rebels killed. According to Jerome, Gallus slew many thousands of people, including even those who were too young to fight. Sozomen, when recalling these events, wrote: "The Jews of Diocæsarea (Sepphoris) also took up arms and invaded the Roman garrisons in Palestine and the neighboring territories, with the design of shaking off the Roman yoke. On hearing of their insurrection, Gallus Caesar, who was then in Antioch, sent troops against them, defeated them, and destroyed Diocæsarea." A midrash suggests that Patricius was killed in the battle.

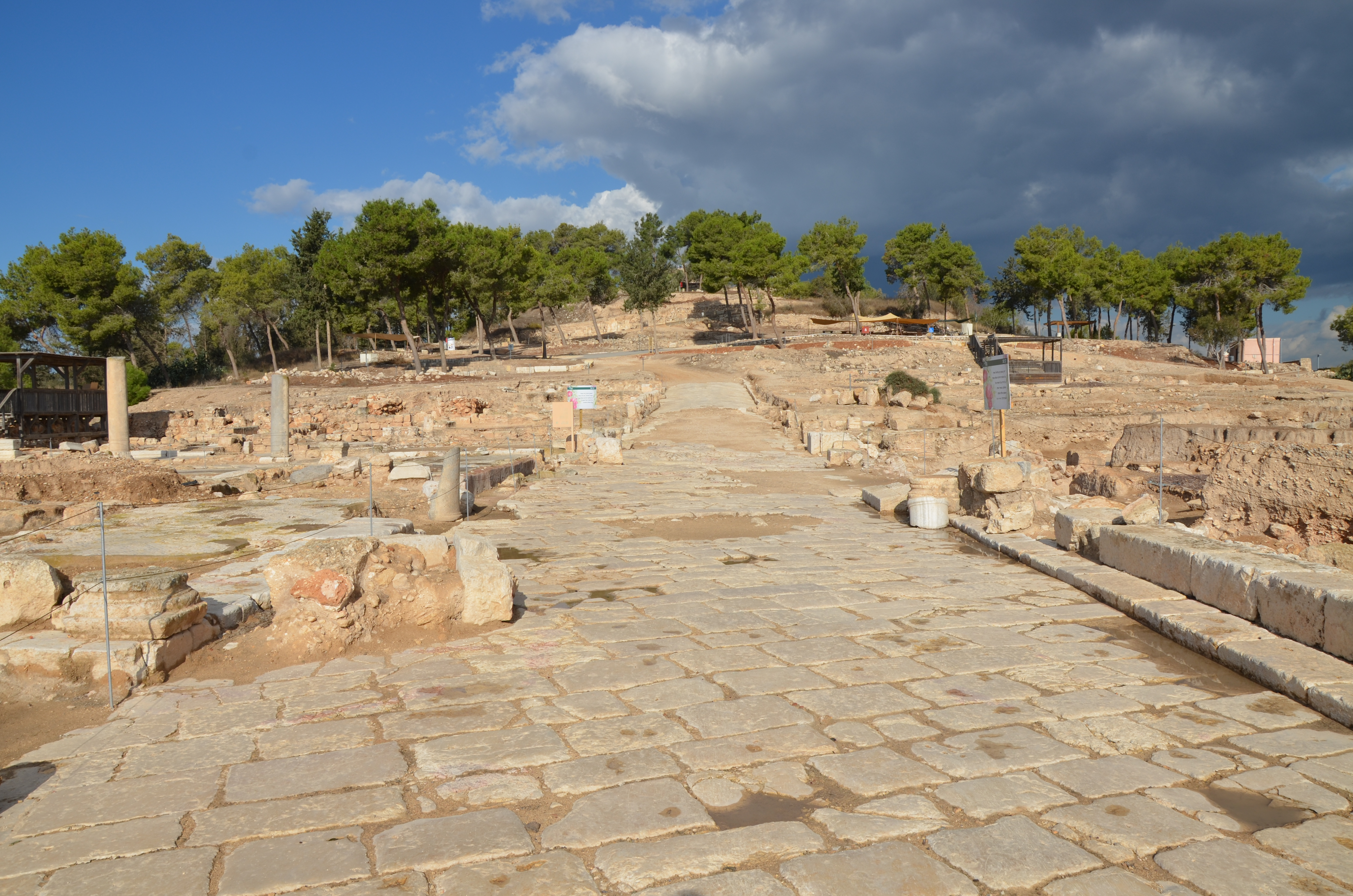
The ruins of Sepphoris

== Aftermath ==
After the events, a permanent garrison occupied Galilee. Following its destruction by Ursicinus, Diocaesarea was subsequently rebuilt. However, the city was devastated once again a few years later by the Galilee earthquake of 363.

== See also ==
- History of the Jews in the Roman Empire
- Jewish–Roman wars
  - First Jewish–Roman War, 66–73 CE
  - Kitos War, 115–117 CE
  - Diaspora revolt, 115–117 CE
  - Bar Kokhba revolt, 132–136 CE
- Samaritan revolts, 484–572 CE
- Jewish revolt against Heraclius, 614–617/625
