= Marcellinus (magister officiorum) =

Marcellinus (died 28 September 351 AD) was a Roman Empire officer under Roman Emperor Constans and usurper Magnentius.

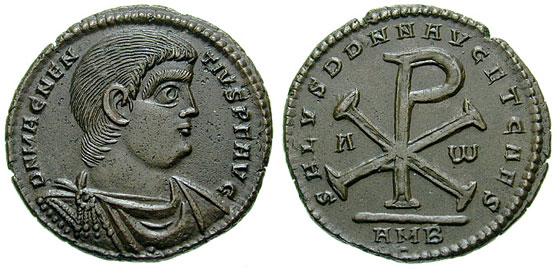
Coin of Magnentius. Marcellinus was comes rerum privatarum of this usurper.

Marcellinus was comes rerum privatarum of Emperor Constans. He played a major role in the election of Magnentius to the rank of Augustus at Augustodunum, on January 18, 350. Marcellinus organized a party for the birthday of his sons, and invited many of the superior officers: Magnentius, acting like interpreting a drama, vested the imperial robes, and was hailed Augustus by the officers; when the troops heard the cries, they supported Magnentius' election.

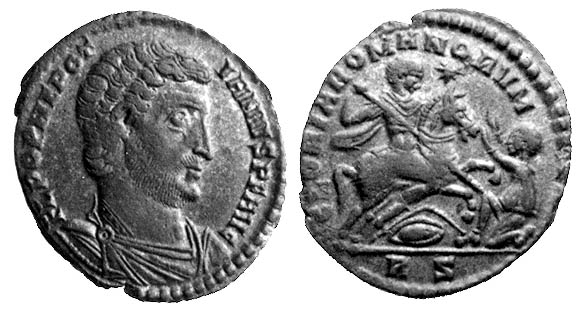
Coin of Nepotianus. Nepotianus, a member of the Constantinian dynasty, rebelled against Magnentius, conquering Rome, but his rule was quickly ended by Marcellinus, who killed both Nepotianus and his mother Eutropia.

Magnentius raised Marcellinus to the rank of magister officiorum; after the usurpation of Nepotianus (3 June 350), Marcellinus was sent to Rome to deal with the matter, and he succeeded in suppressing the revolt (30 June), killing Nepotianus and his mother Eutropia, half-sister of Emperor Constantine I.

Marcellinus also met Emperor Constantius II's messenger, Flavius Philippus, and escorted him to Magnentius, in a failed embassy to avoid a battle between Constantius and Magnentius. Marcellinus disappeared in the following Battle of Mursa Major (28 September 351), in which Magnentius was defeated. Most likely, he was killed, and his body lost.
