= Decentius =

Roman emperor from 350 to 353

- Caesar
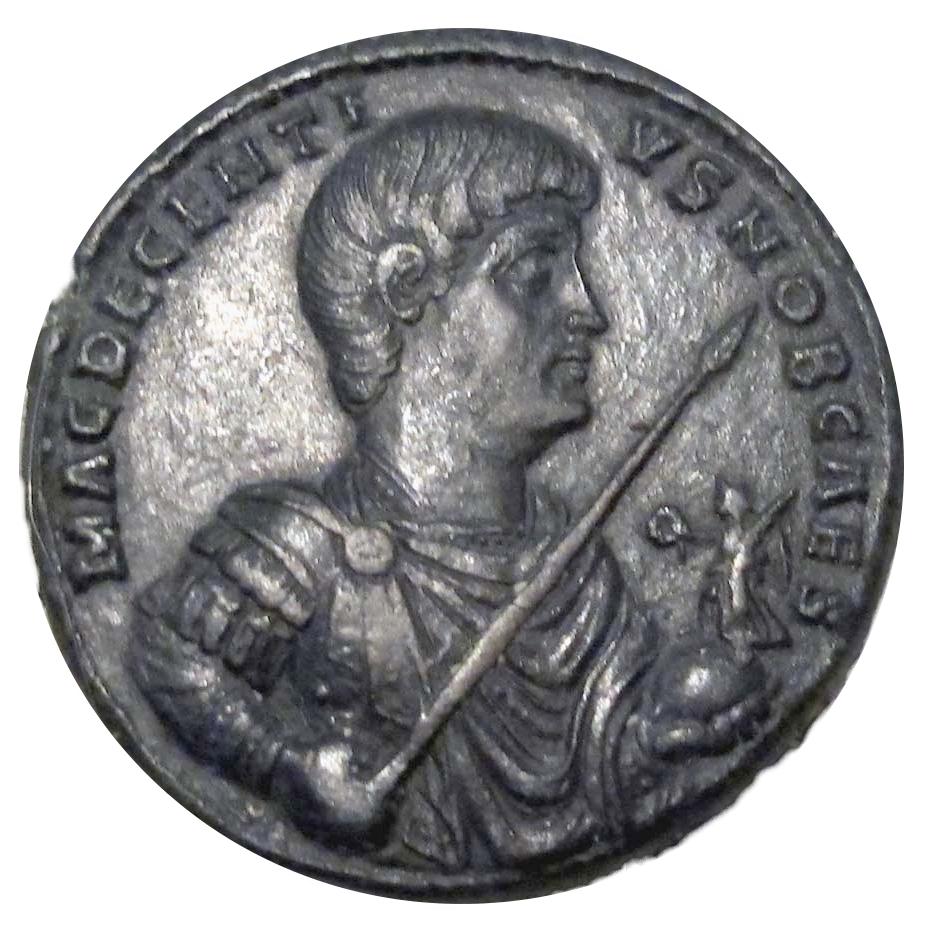
- Medallion of Decentius, minted in Rome
- Reign: July/August 350 – 18 August 353 (caesar under Magnentius)
- Died: 18 August 353; Senonae
Names
- Magnus Decentius
Regnal name
- Magnus Decentius Caesar

Magnus Decentius (died 18 August 353) was caesar of the Western Roman Empire from 350 to 353, under his brother Magnentius.

== History ==
Nothing is known of Decentius prior to 350. Magnentius usurped power from Constans on 18 January 350, and elevated Decentius as caesar later that year, perhaps in July or August. He was appointed consul in 352. In the following year, after losing the Battle of Mursa Major, Magnentius' exactions to finance the war drove Gaul into revolt against his dictatorial rule, and Decentius was expelled from the capital, Treveri, by revolt leader Poemenius.

The Alemanni began to invade the province, perhaps at the instigation of the emperor Constantius II, in order to increase pressure on the usurper. (Note: Although Crawford merely recorded it with the phrase “is said,” he seems to accept it as true, later listing it amongst Constantius’ acts that he considered to be "unscrupulous.") Decentius, who led his brother's forces in the north, was defeated in a pitched battle by the Alemannic chief Chnodomar, and besieged in Sens. There, news reached him of Constantius' victory at the Battle of Mons Seleucus, and the subsequent suicide of Magnentius. Decentius hanged himself, signalling the end of the civil war.

== Sources ==
- Crawford, Peter (2016). Constantius II: Usurpers, Eunuchs, and the Antichrist. Pen & Sword. ISBN 978-1-78340-055-3.
- Martindale, John R.; Jones, A. H. M.; Morris, John, eds. (1971). The Prosopography of the Later Roman Empire: Volume I, AD 260–395. Cambridge: Cambridge University Press. ISBN 0-521-07233-6.
- Ammianus Marcellinus, Res Gestae, XVI
- Edward Gibbon [1789] (1932) The History of the Decline and Fall of the Roman Empire. The Modern Library.

Preceded by Magnentius Augustus, Gaiso; Post consulatum Sergii et Nigriniani (East)	Roman consul 352 with Paulus (West); Constantius Augustus V (East); Constantius Caesar (East)	Succeeded by Magnentius Augustus II, Decentius Caesar II, Constantius Augustus VI, Constantius Caesar II
