= 355 =

355 in various calendars
Gregorian calendar	355; CCCLV
Ab urbe condita	1108
Assyrian calendar	5105
Balinese saka calendar	276–277
Bengali calendar	−239 – −238
Berber calendar	1305
Buddhist calendar	899
Burmese calendar	−283
Byzantine calendar	5863–5864
Chinese calendar	甲寅年 (Wood Tiger); 3052 or 2845 — to — 乙卯年 (Wood Rabbit); 3053 or 2846
Coptic calendar	71–72
Discordian calendar	1521
Ethiopian calendar	347–348
Hebrew calendar	4115–4116
- Hindu calendars
Vikram Samvat	411–412
Shaka Samvat	276–277
Kali Yuga	3455–3456
Holocene calendar	10355
Iranian calendar	267 BP – 266 BP
Islamic calendar	275 BH – 274 BH
Javanese calendar	237–238
Julian calendar	355; CCCLV
Korean calendar	2688
Minguo calendar	1557 before ROC 民前1557年
Nanakshahi calendar	−1113
Seleucid era	666/667 AG
Thai solar calendar	897–898
Tibetan calendar	ཤིང་ཕོ་སྟག་ལོ་ (male Wood-Tiger); 481 or 100 or −672 — to — ཤིང་མོ་ཡོས་ལོ་ (female Wood-Hare); 482 or 101 or −671

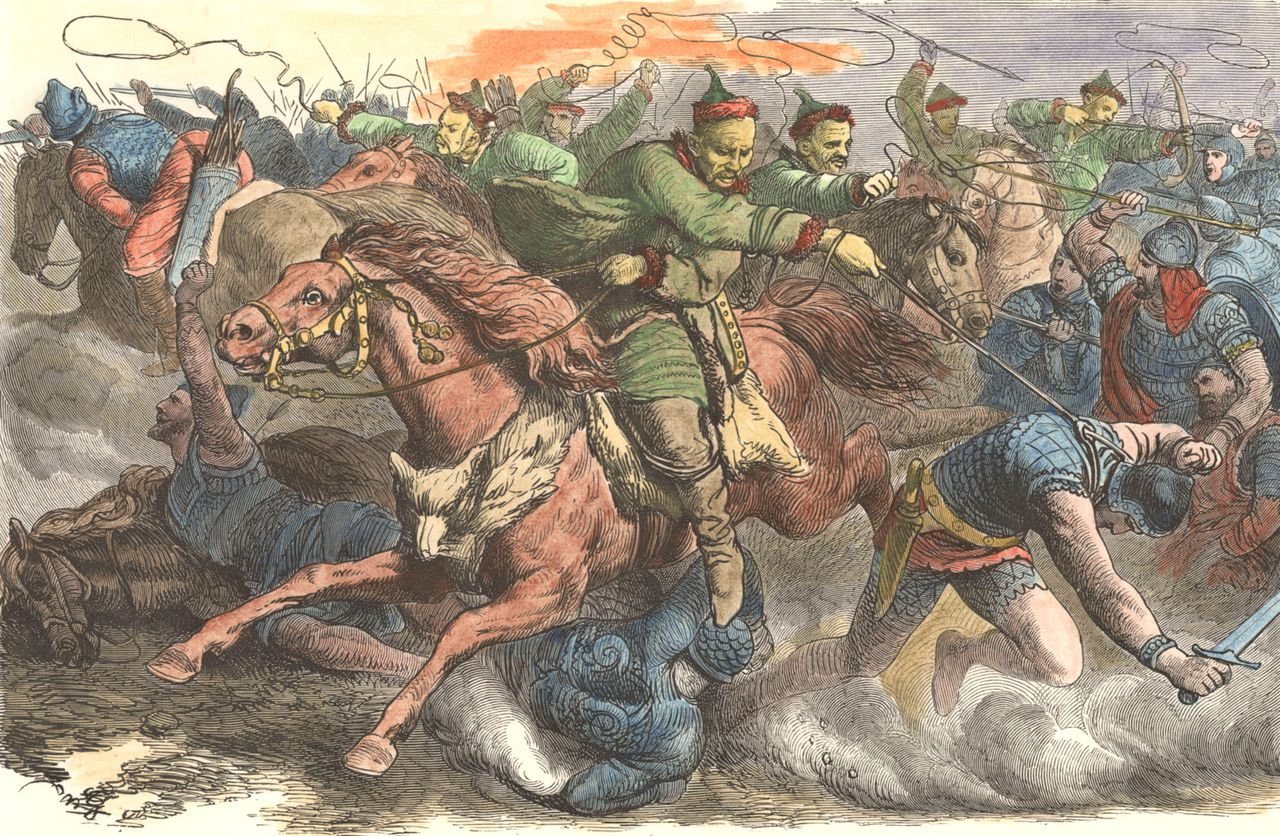
The Huns in battle with the Alans by Peter Johann Nepomuk Geiger (1873)

Year 355 (CCCLV) was a common year starting on Sunday of the Julian calendar. At the time, it was known as the Year of the Consulship of Arbitio and Maesius (or, less frequently, year 1108 Ab urbe condita). The denomination 355 for this year has been used since the early medieval period, when the Anno Domini calendar era became the prevalent method in Europe for naming years.

== Events ==
=== By place ===
==== Roman Empire ====
- January 1 – Arbitio and Lollianus Mavortius begin their term as Roman consuls.
- August 11 – Claudius Silvanus, accused of treason, proclaims himself Roman Emperor. After 28 days, Ursicinus arrives from Rome and has Silvanus murdered.
- November 6 – In Mediolanum (Italy), Emperor Constantius II raises his cousin Julian the Apostate to the rank of Caesar. He takes command of the western provinces and marries Constantius' sister, Helena.

==== Europe ====
- The Lentienses, a Germanic tribe, are fined by the Roman commander Arbetio under Constantius II for several incursions against the Roman Empire.
- The Franks besiege Colonia Agrippinensium for ten months.

==== Asia ====
- The Huns of Central Asia begin their great drive westwards with an advance into Scythia (modern Ukraine). They overcome and absorb the Alans, a nomadic and warlike horse breeding people from the steppes northeast of the Black Sea.

=== By topic ===
==== Religion ====
- Pope Liberius refuses to sign a condemnation of Athanasius, Patriarch of Alexandria, imposed at Milan by Constantius II. Liberius is exiled to Beroea (Greece) and replaced by Felix II. He becomes an antipope and bishop of Rome.

== Births ==
- Fan Tai, Chinese general of the Jin Dynasty (d. 428)
- Murong Bao, Chinese emperor of Later Yan (d. 398)

== Deaths ==
- September 7 – Claudius Silvanus, Roman usurper
- Aedesius, Roman Neoplatonist philosopher and mystic
- Fu Jian, Chinese emperor of the Former Qin (b. 317)
- Liang, Chinese empress of the Former Qin Dynasty
- Zhang Yaoling, Chinese ruler of Former Liang (b. 344)
- Zhang Zuo (or Taibo), Chinese ruler of Former Liang
