= La Bâtie-Montsaléon =

- Commune
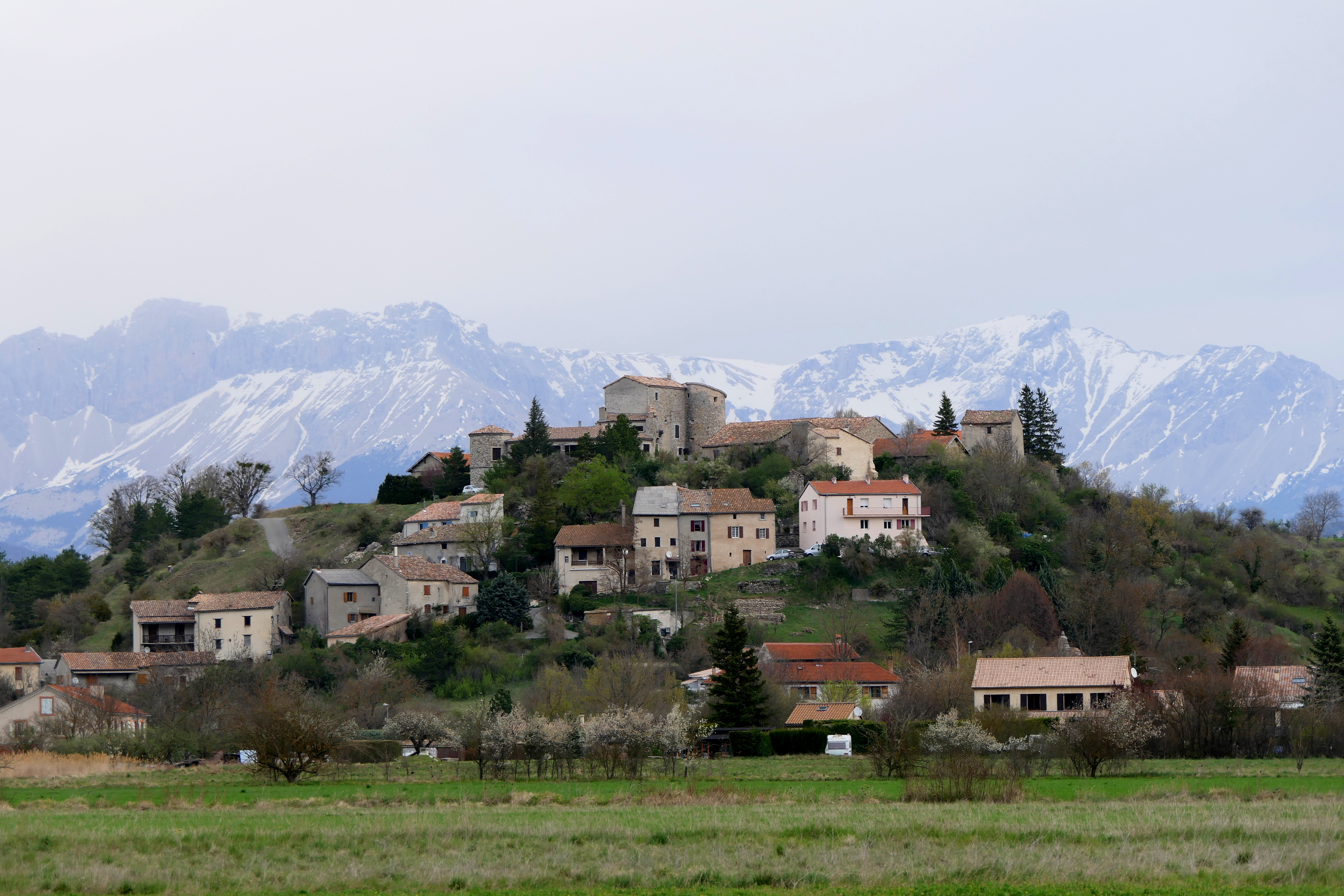

- Coat of arms
- Location of La Bâtie-Montsaléon
- Location within France Location within Provence-Alpes-Côte d'Azur
- Coordinates: 44°27′25″N 5°45′00″E
- Country: France
- Region: Provence-Alpes-Côte d'Azur
- Department: Hautes-Alpes
- Arrondissement: Gap
- Canton: Serres

Government
  - Mayor (2026–32): Mathilde Giroud
- Area^{1}: 15.08 km^{2} (5.82 sq mi)
- Elevation: 760 m (2,490 ft)
- Highest elevation: 1,431 m (4,695 ft)
- Lowest elevation: 671 m (2,201 ft)
- Population (2023): 304
  - Density: 20.2/km^{2} (52.2/sq mi)
- Time zone: UTC+01:00 (CET)
  - Summer (DST): UTC+02:00 (CEST)
- INSEE/Postal code: 05016 /05700
- ^{1} French Land Register data, which excludes lakes, ponds, glaciers > 1 km^{2} (0.386 sq mi or 247 acres) and river estuaries.

La Bâtie-Montsaléon (French pronunciation: [la bati mɔ̃saleɔ̃]; Occitan: La Bastia Montsaleon) is a commune in the Hautes-Alpes department in southeastern France.

It is notable for being the location of the Battle of Mons Seleucus in 353, when Constantius II defeated the usurper Magnentius.

== Population ==
Historical population
| Year | Pop. | ±% p.a. |
|---|---|---|
| 1968 | 134 | — |
| 1975 | 132 | −0.21% |
| 1982 | 134 | +0.22% |
| 1990 | 137 | +0.28% |
| 1999 | 136 | −0.08% |
| 2007 | 189 | +4.20% |
| 2012 | 220 | +3.08% |
| 2017 | 254 | +2.92% |
| 2023 | 304 | +3.04% |
Source: INSEE

== See also ==
- Communes of the Hautes-Alpes department
