= Patricius (usurper) =

Jewish rebel

Patricius (Hebrew: נטרונא, Natrona; d. 352) was one of the main leaders in the Jewish revolt against Constantius Gallus in the Roman province of Syria Palaestina.

== Biography ==
Patricius, known by his countrymen as Natrona, was a messianic claimant and thus a probable member of the Davidic line. Following Constantius II's issuing of laws discriminating against Jews, Patricius, alongside Isaac of Diocesarea led a revolt against the rule of Constantius Gallus, the brother-in-law of Constantius II. Patricius and Isaac took control of Sepphoris alongside several other neighbouring towns, however the revolt was eventually crushed by the Roman general Ursicinus. A midrash suggests that Patricius was killed in the battle around 352.
