= Centenionalis =

Late antique Roman coin

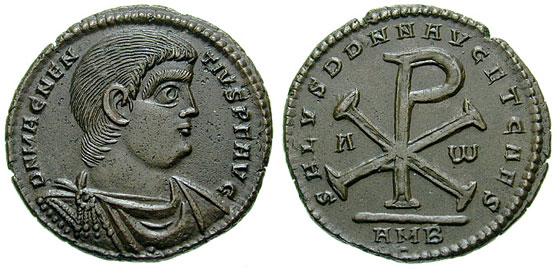
Centenionalis of Magnentius

The bronze centenionalis coins (plural: centenionales) were the attempts of Constans and Constantius II to reintroduce a large bronze coin between 320 and 340 AD, as the follis had by then shrunk dramatically. The type of coin it was is uncertain, but numismatists have categorized large bronze coins of the above date under this denomination. The centenionalis, however, did not last long. By the end of Theodosius the Great's rule, only smaller varieties of bronze coins were minted (AE3 and AE4).

== See also ==
- Roman currency
- Byzantine coinage
