= Ursicinus (magister equitum) =

Roman army officer

Ursicinus was a Roman senior military officer, holding the rank of Magister Equitum per Orientem (Master of Horse of the East) and even Magister Peditum Praesentalis in the later Roman Empire c. 349–359. He was a citizen of Antioch and was well connected in the Eastern part of the Roman Empire.

== Career ==
From AD 349 to 359 he served as Magister Equitum in the East. In 351 or 352 he was entrusted with the suppression of the Jewish revolt against Constantius Gallus led by Patricius and Isaac of Diocesarea. Tiberias and Diospolis, two of the cities conquered by the rebels, were almost completely destroyed, while Diocaesarea was razed to the ground. Ursicinus also was ordered to kill several thousand rebels, even young ones.

=== Service with Ammianus Marcellinus ===
In 353, historian Ammianus Marcellinus was attached to the command of Ursicinus at his headquarters in Nisibis, where he remained until recalled in 354 by Gallus, as the magister equitum, to preside at an investigation for treason in Antioch. According to Ammianus, the charges he was called upon to investigate were preposterous, being fabricated by Gallus' paranoia and bloodthirsty-ness, but Ursicinus nonetheless had to put many to death. Constantius, having heard of the ongoing disorders in the administration of the east, decided to dethrone Gallus at once by whatever means possible. Meanwhile, the high chamberlain Eusebius and other enemies of Ursicinus at court had poisoned Constantius' mind against the magister equitum, so that the emperor resolved to recall him to the court on the pretext of promotion, to prevent him from conspiring from afar.

When, in 355, Claudius Silvanus revolted against Emperor Constantius II in Gaul, Ursicinus was sent to him with a letter of recall by Constantius, which he was ordered to deliver in as favorable a manner as possible and dissuade Claudius from revolt. However, since Silvanus' revolt had already reached uncontrollable proportions, Ursicinus had to assassinate Silvanus, thereupon assuming his command.

Ursicinus was ordered to remain in Gaul to supervise Julian as he took command as Caesar of Gaul, Spain and Britain. In 357 or 358 Constantius sent him back east to resume his command. The court intrigues of Eusebius the high chamberlain, according to Ammianus, brought about his recall to the court in the same year, where he was to be given the position of master of infantry, taken from Barbatio who was lately executed. Once near the court it would be easy to have him implicated for treason The threat of war from Persia led to his being immediately sent back to the frontier, but he was placed under the orders of Sabinianus, a pusillanimous and debauched old man, who spent the entire ensuing campaign in his luxurious mansion in Edessa. Ursicinus arrived just in time for the Siege of Amida, near which he was nearly captured by the cavalry of the Persian vanguard, and his guard dispersed.

Ursicinus was able to maintain contact with the defenders of the city, and he did his utmost to relieve them but was foiled by the cowardice of Sabinianus, who forbade him in the name of the emperor from putting his soldiers at any risk. In the picturesque language of Ammianus Marcellinus: "So that he seemed like a lion, terrible for his size and ferocity, but with claws cut and teeth drawn, so that he could not save from danger his cubs entangled in the nets of the hunters."

Ursicinus was dismissed after the destruction of Amida (modern Diyarbakır, Turkey) in AD 359 by the Persians, for which he was officially blamed.

The Roman historian Ammianus Marcellinus, who served on Ursicinus' staff, revered him.

== Family ==
Ursicinus had several sons, most notable was Potentius who died at the Battle of Adrianople.
