= Bonitus (magister militum) =

Bonitus was a Salian Frank of Laetic origin. He was the first ever Frank to be made magister militum, in 324. He fought beside Constantine against Licinius and was the father of the general Claudius Silvanus.

== Sources ==
- Ammianus Marcellinus, History, XV,5,33
