= Nepotianus =

Roman imperial usurper in 350

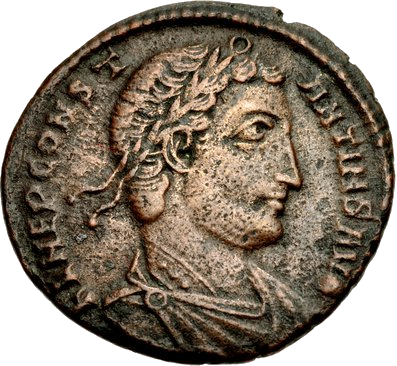
- Nepotianus on a coin bearing his claimed title of Augustus

Roman emperor
- Reign: 3–30 June 350 (in competition with Magnentius)
- Died: 30 June 350; Rome
Regnal name
- Flavius Julius Popilius Nepotianus Constantinus
- Dynasty: Constantinian
- Father: Virius Nepotianus
- Mother: Eutropia

Nepotianus (died 30 June 350), sometimes known in English as Nepotian, was a member of the Constantinian dynasty who reigned as a short-lived usurper of the Roman Empire. He ruled the city of Rome for twenty-eight days, before being killed by his rival usurper Magnentius's general Marcellinus.

== Background ==
Nepotianus was the son of Eutropia, half-sister of Emperor Constantine I, and of Virius Nepotianus. On his mother's side, he was the grandson of Emperor Constantius Chlorus and Flavia Maximiana Theodora.

After Constantine I’s death in 337, several male members of the Constantinian dynasty were killed. Burgess considered it odd that no source mentioned Nepotianus’ survival, not even Julian. He suggested the idea that Nepotianus was born after the massacre. However, if this was true then he would be 12 years old at most at the time of his usurpation, something that none of the sources acknowledged.

== Events ==
After the revolt of Magnentius, Nepotianus proclaimed himself emperor and entered Rome with a band of gladiators on 3 June 350. After attempting to resist Nepotianus with an undisciplined force of Roman citizens, the defeated praefectus urbi Titianus (or Anicius, or Anicetus), a supporter of Magnentius, fled the city.

Magnentius quickly dealt with this revolt by sending his trusted magister officiorum Marcellinus to Rome. According to Eutropius, Nepotianus was killed in the resulting struggle (on 30 June), his head put on a lance and borne around the city. In the following days, his mother Eutropia was also killed alongside the supporters of Nepotianus.

== See also ==
- List of Roman emperors
- List of Roman usurpers
