= Silvanus (magister peditum) =

Roman army officer and imperial pretender

Silvanus (Note: An inscription in Italy (CIL X, 6945) refers to an imperial pretender named "Claudius Silvanus", but its authenticity is doubtful since Silvanus was not recognized there, and the emperor Constantius II then resided at Milan.) (died 7 September 355) was a Roman general and usurper of Frankish descent. He revolted in Gaul against Emperor Constantius II, claiming the imperial title for 28 days in AD 355.

== Origin and career ==
Silvanus was born in Gaul, the son of Bonitus, a Laetic Frankish general who had supported Constantine I in the civil war against Licinius. Like so many other Franks of his times, and like his father before him, he was a loyal and thoroughly Romanized "barbarian" in the military service of the Empire. In AD 351, he held the rank of tribune in the army of the rebel Magnentius, and in this role he defected to Emperor Constantius II at the Battle of Mursa Major. Silvanus was soon promoted to the post of magister peditum in Gaul in 353. Gaul had been subject to raiding and looting by Alemanni tribesmen; Constantius entrusted Silvanus with the difficult task of driving the invaders back beyond the Rhine, and restoring the fast-eroding Roman authority in the province. Silvanus fulfilled his mission through a combination of military action and bribing the Alemannic chieftains with the taxes he had collected, and also suppressed the local bagaudae insurrections flaring up again in central and northern Gaul.

== Trial and usurpation ==
The sources then report that Silvanus fell afoul of a plot orchestrated by an official named Dynamius. He obtained letters of recommendation from Silvanus, and then with a sponge he removed all the writing except for Silvanus’ signature. He next forged new letters on the effaced spaces which gave the impression that Silvanus was planning to declare himself emperor and overthrow Constantius II. Ammianus does not record why Dynamius decided to do this, and it is not as if he was in an obvious position to directly benefit from Silvanus’ downfall. It has thus been theorized that someone of a higher position, perhaps the magister militum Arbitio, was directing the plot. Dynamius, being of a relatively low rank, could not get the letters directly into the hands of the emperor, so he gave them to the Praetorian Prefect Lampadius, who passed them on to Constantius. Ammianus also writes that Eusebius, a former comes rei privatae, and Aedesius, a former magister officiorum, were co-conspirators in the scheme.

Constantius then summoned his advisory council, the consistorium. They also thought the letters were legitimate, and orders were given to arrest Silvanus, as well as the individuals to whom the letters were addressed.

But Malarichus, a Frank like Silvanus and the man who would later be offered a position in the military magisterium but would turn it down, and who was at this time a tribunus in the imperial court, spoke up to defend the suspected magister militum. Malarichus summoned his collegae, his associates, of which most are unnamed except Mallobaudes, also a tribunus and a Frank. These officers are thus linked to Silvanus not only by their supportive actions, but also by shared ethnicity and career. They protested against Constantius’ orders, and Malarichus requested that he be allowed to go to Silvanus and investigate the truth of the matter. The strength of this network and their connection to Silvanus is demonstrated when Malarichus offered his own family as hostages to guarantee he would not betray Constantius. Even so, Constantius refused him, and instead sent one of Arbitio’s associates, the agens in rebus Apodemius. We should remember that Ammianus says Arbitio convinced Constantius to send Silvanus to deal with the raids along the Rhine frontier in the hopes he would be too far removed from court to exert any influence, and would maybe even perish. Thus, Arbitio and probably Apodemius were not friends of Silvanus.

Dynamius continued to thicken the plot by forging a new letter and sending it to the tribunus of the Cremona fabrica. This time the letter appeared to come from Silvanus and Malarichus, requesting that the tribunus hastily complete the final preparations for the rebellion. Obviously confused by the unexpected arrival of the letter, the tribunus showed Malarichus the letter and asked for clarification of what exactly he meant. A forged letter now being in his possession, Malarichus was able to once again bring together his collegae to help him confront Constantius with the new evidence. Florentinus, deputy to the magister officiorum, was appointed to investigate the matter and concluded that all the letters were forgeries. The plot uncovered, Constantius looked to punish the true conspirators. Lampadius was arrested and questioned, but was acquitted because of the aid of his friends. Most surprisingly, the orchestrator of it all, Dynamius, was found innocent and promoted to the rank of corrector. Even with his innocence revealed, Silvanus feared that he would still face punishment from the unpredictable emperor. He had been receiving word from his friends about the emperor’s suspicions, and that Apodemius had been seizing his properties in Gaul with impunity, and he did not feel confident that his innocence would protect him. He thought about escaping back to his countrymen, the Franks, but a tribunus in his army, Laniogaisus, told him that the Franks would most likely either kill him or turn him over to the Romans for a ransom. Silvanus, seeing no other viable choice, decided he would truly have to usurp imperial power, and after discussions with the chief officers of his army, he declared himself emperor on 11 August 355 in Colonia Agrippina (modern Cologne).

=== Controversy ===
Historian John Drinkwater doubts that Silvanus’ usurpation occurred at all because of the complete lack of coins produced with Silvanus' face on them, and the inconsistencies of Ammianus’ account, the most detailed version of these events. This opinion has been followed by professor Michael Kulikowski, who writes that it is “certain” the rebellion did not happen and instead Silvanus was executed while still a magister militum.

This position has been countered in part by David Hunt. He points out that, even if Ammianus presents difficulties, only a few years later, emperor Julian wrote about the usurpation, as did Aurelius Victor. Zonaras also makes mention of Silvanus being forced into rebellion because of intrigues. The weight of the contemporary literary evidence is thus impossible to dismiss – it is impossible to believe that all these people could fake an event that occurred within the lifetimes of their audiences. Hunt further argues that the rebellion was simply smaller than Ammianus would have us believe, and Silvanus had not yet secured the mint at Trier to begin distributing coins. Ammianus’ significance of the rebellion is exaggerated because of his personal involvement: initially, before the historian was involved, Ammianus wishes to portray Silvanus and a poor innocent man falling afoul of the brutal conspiracies plaguing Constantius’ court. Then when Ammianus does become involved in Silvanus’ downfall, the usurper is shifted to be more akin to a regular rebel that deserves to be executed, in order to make Ammianus’ role in such an end more palatable.

It is also worthwhile to consider John Weisweiler’s argument that Ammianus is offering a meta-lesson to his audience, educating them on how to read and use literature through a motif of the misuse of literature (Dynamius’ forged letters). Thus the potential rhetorical elements in Ammianus’ account muddy the waters of what really occurred, however not to a fatal extent.

Historian Christopher Bendle provides an additional explanation as to why Silvanus issued no coins: a period of extensive planning usually occurred before a rebellion. This planning is naturally secretive, and even though the act of usurpation is often portrayed as spontaneous it is long in the making. Furtive connections are established between the usurper and other important individuals and groups: military leaders and soldiers, senators, the Church, and civilian bureaucrats, including those who ran the imperial fabricae and mints. Silvanus, however, did not have the luxury of a planning period. Dynamius’ conspiracy must have happened over a relatively short span of time, with Silvanus only making his decision to usurp suddenly. Prior to his declaration, he was considering other options such as fleeing across the border to the Franks instead of planning a rebellion. Furthermore, Silvanus gave a donative to his soldiers on Constantius’ birthday, effectively boosting their loyalty to the emperor, only four days before he would declare himself a rebel emperor. This could in fact indicate that on that date Silvanus had still not decided on his course of action, and thus potentially only had three or fewer days to prepare, assuredly not enough time to connect with the commanders in charge of the mints in Trier. Even after Silvanus’ declaration and him reaching out to contact the mint, the commander would want to verify messages and assess his own position in regard to the likely ensuing civil war before committing to Silvanus’ side. Silvanus would have to decide on the motifs and symbols he wished to use, and have dies created. Then there would be the matter of distribution. Thus, although it can still strike as surprising that Vetranio issued no coins, it is not certain evidence that his rebellion never occurred. Furthermore, the lack of coins pales in comparison to the weight of contemporary literature in favor of the rebellion.

== Death of Silvanus ==
When news of Silvanus' rebellion came to the imperial court at Milan, Ammianus reports that at first there was great panic, and Constantius called a midnight meeting of his consistorium. They settled on the idea of using the magister militum Ursicinus to deal with Silvanus. Ursicinus was sent to Cologne with Ammianus himself, along with Verinianus, eight other protectores, and some tribuni. They were to deliver an official letter to Silvanus, recalling him to court as if nothing were amiss, apparently in the hope that he would simply give up the usurpation. When they arrived, however, Ursicinus figured the rebellion had progressed too far for this to succeed, and he instead decided he would pose as a fellow malcontent, unhappy with Constantius and willing to join the rebellion. This worked, and Ursicinus was taken on as one of Silvanus’ closest confidants. While Silvanus complained to Ursicinus about the unfairness of Constantius’ decisions, the protectores and tribuni were able to bribe the Bracchiati and Cornuti companies of soldiers into betraying Silvanus, and they murdered the usurper while he was on his way to a Christian church service. After Silvanus’ death, his rebellion rapidly dissipated and those involved were arrested and tried.

== Ammianus's report of Silvanus' death ==
It has been suggested by at least one scholar that Ammianus invented the entire coup attempt to gloss over the role played by his patron, Ursicinus, in the murder of a fellow general. This theory suggests that Constantius had grown suspicious of the popular Frankish general and so offered his post to Ursicinus, who then murdered his peer in the course of a botched change of command. It has been noted that Silvanus did not mint any coinage (which would have been a clear indication of a usurpation attempt), unlike other equally short-lived usurpers of the era, such as Poemenius. However, the thesis of a concocted coup attempt is generally rejected by scholars. The lack of numismatic evidence is not determinative, because Trier, the nearest minting centre to Colonia Agrippina, closed its gates to Silvanus.

Ammianus concludes his treatment of the Silvanus episode:

Such was the end of a commander of no small merit, who was driven by fear of the slanders in which a hostile clique had ensnared him in his absence to adopt extreme measures in self-defence.
