= Bonitus (abbot) =

Italian Benedictine monk and abbot (died c. 584)

Saint Bonitus of Monte Cassino

Abbot
- Died: 582; Italy
- Honored in: Eastern Orthodox Christianity
- Feast: July 7

Bonitus of Monte Cassino (died c. 582) was a Benedictine monk and the fourth abbot of the monastery of Monte Cassino. During his abbacy the monastery was plundered by the Lombards under Zotto of Benevento and Bonitus fled with his monks to the Lateran Hill in Rome, dying shortly afterwards.

He is venerated as a saint in the Eastern Orthodox Church, and his feast day is July 7.
