= Roman civil war of 350–353 =

Civil War (350-353)

- Part of the Roman civil wars
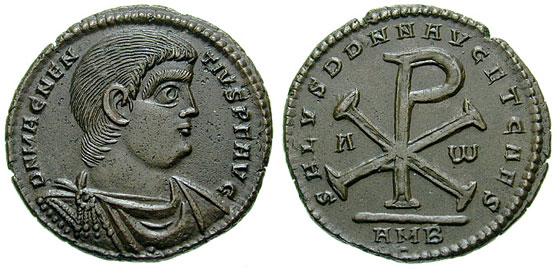
- Coin of the usurper Magnentius
Date	350–353
Location	Roman Empire
Result	Constantius II victory

Belligerents
Constantius II	Magnentius

Commanders and leaders
Constantius II	Magnentius

The Roman civil war of 350–353 AD was a war fought between the Roman emperor Constantius II and the usurper Magnentius.

== Background ==
With the death of Constantine I in 337 AD, the empire was divided between his three sons from his marriage to Fausta. Constantine II received Gaul, Spain and Britain. Constantius II was given Asia Minor, Egypt and Syria. Finally, Constans I obtained Italy, North Africa and Illyricum. Constantine II resented his brothers for not respecting his seniority as the eldest, and therefore the senior Augustus. Unhappy over the distribution of the provinces, he invaded Italy in 340 AD, only to be killed in an ambush by Constans' troops. Constans now assumed control of all the western provinces of the empire.

Constans grew unpopular with the army, leading to a military conspiracy which overthrew and killed him in 350 AD. The soldiers elevated a barbarian officer called Magnentius as the new western emperor, bringing him into conflict with Constantius, the sole remaining son of Constantine I.

== Civil war ==
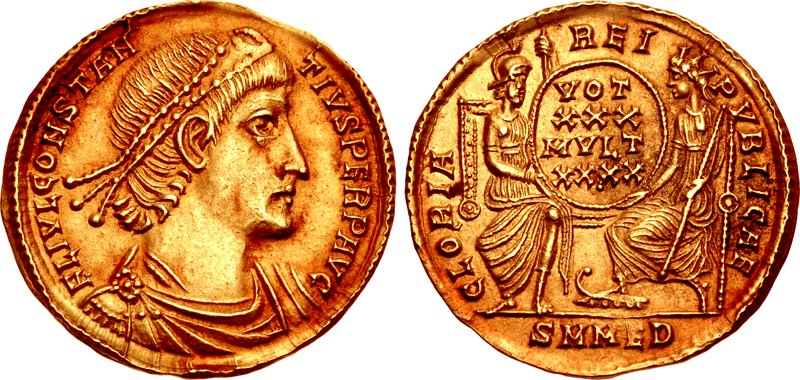
Gold solidus minted just after the civil war; the text reads "Glory of the Republic."

Constantius marched westward to avenge the murder of his brother. Magnentius decided to invade Illyricum, and initially his army performed very well. The situation changed dramatically when his troops encountered Constantius' cataphract cavalry at the Battle of Mursa on 28 September 351. The fighting involved 95,000 troops and left 55,000 casualties in one of the bloodiest battles in Roman history. Magnentius lost and fled to northern Italy, while Constantius slowly regained control of Africa, Spain, and southern Italy. Magnentius decided to retreat into Gaul, where Constantius defeated him again at Mons Seleucus on 3 July 353. Magnentius fled to Lugdunum and committed suicide with his sword on 11 August 353. Constantius had Magnentius' followers and supporters investigated, tortured and killed.
