= Flavius Abinnaeus =

Part of P.Abinn. 1, a Latin petition in Roman cursive addressed by Abinnaeus to the emperors in 340–342 and a major source for his biography

Flavius Abinnaeus (c. 286 – after 351) was a Roman officer in Egypt from 303 to 351.

Abinnaeus was probably a Christian and a Syrian. His wife was Aurelia Nonna of Alexandria. He claims that he served for 33 years as a ducenarius in the vexillatio Parthosagittariorum at Diospolis (Thebes) until he was sent by the comes Senecio to escort the ambassadors of the Blemmyes to Constantinople. He was in the city in July 336 for the tricennalia (thirtieth anniversary) of the Emperor Constantine I, when the emperor's son Constantius II was also present. In Constantinople, he was promoted to the rank of protector. He escorted the Blemmyan ambassadors to their homeland in the Eastern Desert, where he remained for three years.

In 339 or 340, Abinnaeus brought some recruits from the Thebaid to the court of Constantius II at Hierapolis, perhaps for the planned Persian campaign mentioned in the Itinerarium Alexandri. At Hierapolis, he was appointed by imperial letter to be praefectus of the ala Quinta Praelectorum stationed in Dionysias. He had to write to the emperor to have his appointment confirmed, since others had apparently bought the office by suffragium. He can be confirmed in office by 29 March 342. He may have been raised to the honorary rank of tribune as recognition of his time as protector. The comes Valacius dismissed him as praefectus in 344, perhaps for religious reasons, but he appealed to the emperor in 345. He may have travelled to the court of Constantius II in Antioch to obtain his reinstatement. He was back in office by 1 May 346. He still held the office as late as 11 February 351, on which day he officially retired to Philadelphia.

Abinnaeus's life is known in detail because an archive of 82 of his documents on papyrus was discovered in Philadelphia (Fayyum) and purchased by the British Museum and the University of Geneva in 1893. Two of the documents are in Latin and the rest in Greek. They date to the period 340/341–351. They were edited and published with an English translation in 1962. They are cited with the prefix P.Abinn. The 1962 edition includes one document which is not part of the archive and is missing one that is. The accounts, contracts, letters, petitions and receipts in the archive cover both public and private matters. They show that the military authorities were often called upon in juridical matters.

== Bibliography ==
- Ast, Rodney (2018). "Abinnaeus, Flavius". In Nicholson, Oliver (ed.). The Oxford Dictionary of Late Antiquity, Volume 1: A–I. Oxford: Oxford University Press. pp. 4–5. ISBN 978-0-19-881624-9.
- Barnes, T. D. (1985). "The Career of Abinnaeus". Phoenix. 29 (4): 368–374. doi:10.2307/1088399. JSTOR 1088399.
- Bell, H. I.; Martin, V.; Turner, E. G.; van Berchem, D., eds. (1962). The Abinnaeus Archive: Papers of a Roman Officer in the Reign of Constantius II. Clarendon Press.
- De Ricci, Seymour (1928). "A Latin Petition of Abinnaeus (Papyrus BM 447)". The Journal of Egyptian Archaeology. 14 (1): 320–322. doi:10.1177/030751332801400161.
- MacCoull, Leslie B. (1991). "Abinnaeus Archive". In Kazhdan, Alexander (ed.). The Oxford Dictionary of Byzantium. Vol. 1. Oxford and New York: Oxford University Press. p. 4. ISBN 0-19-504652-8.
- Martindale, John R.; Jones, A. H. M.; Morris, John, eds. (1971). The Prosopography of the Later Roman Empire: Volume I, AD 260–395. Cambridge: Cambridge University Press. ISBN 0-521-07233-6.
- Rémondon, Roger (1974). "Un papyrus inedit des archives d'Abinnaeus". Journal of Juristic Papyrology. 18: 33–37.
- Török, László (1988). Late Anique Nubia: History and Archaeology of the Southern Neighbour of Egypt in the 14th–16th c. A.D. Archaeological Institute of the Hungarian Academy of Sciences.
- Woloch, Michael (1968). "Flavius Abinnaeus: A Note". Hermes. 96 (5): 758–760. JSTOR 4475563.
