= Battle of Mons Seleucus =

Battle won by Constantius II

Coordinates: 44°27′35.3″N 5°44′10.5″E

- Part of the Roman civil war of 350–353
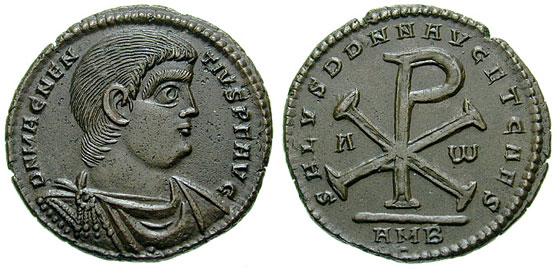
- Magnentius. 350–353 AD. Æ Double Centenionalis (8.88 gm). Amiens mint.
Date	August 353 AD
Location	La Bâtie-Montsaléon, France
Result	Constantius victory

Belligerents
Roman Empire	Roman Empire

Commanders and leaders
Constantius II	Magnentius

The Battle of Mons Seleucus was fought in 353 between the armies of the Roman emperor Constantius II and the usurper Magnentius. Constantius' forces were victorious. Support for Magnentius had been eroding since his defeat at the Battle of Mursa Major two years prior; after Mons Seleucus his cause collapsed and he killed himself.

== Background ==
Following his defeat at Mursa, Magnentius fled to Aquileia and summoned all his supporters to join him. Decentius, brother of Magnentius and newly-appointed Caesar, was engaged with an incursion of Alemanni, and could not afford to send any of his forces to Aquileia.

Constantius spent his time recruiting troops and retaking towns occupied by Magnentius. In the summer of 352 he moved into Italy, only to find that Magnentius had chosen not to defend the peninsula.

== Battle ==
The armies of Constantius and Magnentius met at Mons Seleucus, in what is now La Bâtie-Montsaléon in Hautes-Alpes, south-eastern France. According to the historian Peter Crawford, it is not possible to fix the exact date of the battle from surviving sources. The rivals' prior movements are also unclear; Eutropius states that the usurper was "defeated in several battles", possibly leading up to the final battle at Mons Seleucus. Regardless, Constantius was again victorious and Magnentius killed himself on 10 August 353. (Note: Frakes states Magnentius and Decentius were executed by Constantius) Following his conclusive battle, Constantius wintered his troops at Arles.

== Aftermath ==
Constantius, now undisputed Emperor of the Roman Empire, appointed Julian Caesar over the western half of the Empire in 355/6, and instigated a campaign to persecute those who had supported Magnentius. According to Ammianus Marcellinus, Constantius had become more "cruel, violent, and suspicious with age", and his notarii and bodyguards needed no pretext beyond mere suspicion to inflict punishment.

== Sources ==
- Barnes, Timothy David (1993). Athanasius and Constantius: Theology and Politics in the Constantinian Empire. Harvard University Press. ISBN 0-674-05067-3.
- Crawford, Peter (2016). Constantius II: Usurpers, Eunuchs, and the Antichrist. Pen & Sword. ISBN 978-1-78340-055-3.
- Frakes, Robert M. (2006). "The Dynasty of Constantine down to 363". In Lenski, Noel Emmanuel (ed.). The Cambridge Companion to the Age of Constantine, Volume 13. Cambridge University Press.
- Hunt, David (1998). "The successors of Constantine". In Cameron, Averil; Garnsey, Peter (eds.). The Cambridge Ancient History: The late empire, A.D. 337-425. Vol. XIII (2nd ed.). Cambridge University Press. pp. 1–43.
