= Battle of Mursa Major =

Part of the Roman civil war of 350–353

Battle of Mursa
- Part of the Roman civil war of 350–353
| Date | 28 September 351 AD |
| Location | Mursa, Pannonia (modern Osijek, Croatia) 45°33′27″N 18°40′46″E |
| Result | Victory for Constantius II |

Belligerents
| Roman Empire | Roman Empire |

Commanders and leaders
| Magnentius | Constantius II |

Strength
| 36,000–80,000 | 60,000–80,000 |

Casualties and losses
| 24,000-30,000 | 30,000 |
- Location of the battle within modern Croatia

The Battle of Mursa was fought on 28 September 351 between the eastern Roman armies led by the Emperor Constantius II and the western forces supporting the usurper Magnentius. It took place at Mursa, near the Via Militaris in the province of Pannonia (modern Osijek, Croatia). The battle was one of the bloodiest in Roman history.

== Background ==
Following Constantine I's death in 337 the succession was far from clear. Constantine II, Constantius II, and Constans were all Caesars overseeing particular regions of the empire, although none of them were powerful enough to claim the title of Augustus. Fueled by the belief that Constantine wished for his sons to rule a tripartite empire after him, the military massacred other members of Constantine's family. This massacre precipitated a re-divisioning of the empire, by which Constantine took Gaul, Hispania, and Britain, while Constans acquired Italy, Africa, Dacia, and Illyricum, and Constantius inherited Asia, Egypt, and Syria.

After attempting to impose his authority over Carthage and being blocked, Constantine II attacked his brother Constans in 340, but was ambushed and killed near Aquileia in northern Italy. Constans took possession of the provinces of the west, and ruled for ten years over two-thirds of the Roman world. In the meantime, Constantius was engaged in a difficult war against the Persians under Shapur II in the east.

== Rebellion of Magnentius ==
In 350, the mismanagement of Constans had alienated his generals and civilian officials and Magnentius had himself proclaimed Augustus of the west, resulting in the murder of Constans. Magnentius quickly marched his army into Italy, appointing Fabius Titanius as praefectus urbi consolidating his influence over Rome. By the time Magnentius' army arrived at the Julian passes, Vetranio, Constans' lieutenant in Illyricum, had been declared Augustus by his troops. Magnentius initially attempted a political dialogue with Constantius and Vetranio, but the rebellion of Nepotianus in Rome changed his intentions from joining the Constantian dynasty to supplanting it. It was during this rebellion that Magnentius promoted his brother Decentius to Caesar.

Constantius' reaction was limited. Already involved in a war with the Sasanian Empire, he was in no position to deal with Magnentius or Vetranio. Following Shapur's retreat from Nisibis, Constantius marched his army to Serdica meeting Vetranio with his army. Instead of a battle, both Constantius and Vetranio appeared before the latter's army, and Vetranio agreed to abdicate. Constantius then advanced west with his reinforced army to encounter Magnentius.

On 28 September 351 AD, Magnentius marched his army of 36,000 - 80,000 troops down the Via Militaris and besieged Mursa. The siege was short-lived. When Constantius' army of 60,000 - 80,000 arrived, Magnentius was forced to retreat. Magnentius regrouped his army on the open plain north-west of Mursa, near the Drava River.

Once his army was deployed, Constantius sent his praetorian prefect, Flavius Philippus, with a peace offer. However, his true purpose was to gather information concerning Magnentius's troop strength.

Constantius retired to a church to pray, leaving his generals in charge of his army.

== The battle ==
The battle unfolded on a wide, open plain close to the city. Constantius's army held an advantage in both light and heavy cavalry, as well as armored horse–archers. Using his cavalry to outflank and encircle Magnentius’s right wing, Constantius's army launched a crushing assault that, after fierce combat, secured his victory. Magnentius's army suffered 24,000-30,000 casualties, (Note: Magnentius lost two-thirds of his army.) while Constantius's army lost 30,000 in the battle.

== Aftermath ==
Constantius himself was not present at the battle; he heard of his army's victory from the bishop of Mursa while visiting the tomb of a Christian martyr. (Note: Crawford doubts such reports of Constantius' visit during the battle, calling them anti-Constantian sources.) Whereupon, Constantius informed those of the Christian community that his victory was due to God's aid.

Following his victory at Mursa, Constantius chose not to pursue the fleeing Magnentius, instead spending the next ten months recruiting new troops and retaking towns still loyal to Magnentius. In the summer of 352, Constantius moved west into Italy, to find that Magnentius had chosen not to defend the peninsula. After waiting until September 352, he made Naeratius Cerealis praefectus urbi and moved his army to Milan for winter quarters. In the summer of 353 Constantius marched his army further west to confront Magnentius at the Battle of Mons Seleucus.

== Historiography of the battle ==
Numerous contemporary writers considered the loss of Roman lives at Mursa a disaster for the Roman Empire. Crawford states the barbarian contingents took the lion's share of the casualties, and yet the losses suffered at Mursa, according to Eutropius, could have won triumphs from foreign wars and brought peace. Zosimus called the battle at Mursa a major disaster, with the army so weakened that it could not counter barbarian incursions. Modern historians Peter Crawford, Sam Lieu, and J.P.C. Kent have characterized it as a pyrrhic victory for Constantius.

== Sources ==
- Angelov, Alexander (2018). "Mursa and Battles of Mursa". In Nicholson, Oliver (ed.). The Oxford Dictionary of Late Antiquity. Oxford: Oxford University Press. p. 1047. ISBN 978-0-19-866277-8.
- Barnes, Timothy David (1993). Athanasius and Constantius: Theology and Politics in the Constantinian Empire. Harvard University Press. ISBN 0-674-05067-3.
- Crawford, Peter (2016). Constantius II: Usurpers, Eunuchs, and the Antichrist. Pen & Sword. ISBN 978-1-78340-055-3.
- Doležal, Stanislav (2022). The Reign of Constantine, 306–337: Continuity and Change in the Late Roman Empire. Springer International Publishing. ISBN 9783030974640.
- Drinkwater, John F. (2022). "The battle of Mursa, 351: causes, course, and consequences". Journal of Late Antiquity. 15: 28–68. doi:10.1353/jla.2022.0001.
- Dupuy, R. Ernest; Dupuy, Trevor N., eds. (1993). "351. Battle of Mursa". The Harper's Encyclopedia of Military History: From 3500 B.C. to the present (4th ed.). HarperCollins Publisher. ISBN 0-06-270056-1.
- Kent, J. P. C. (1979). "The End of Roman Britain: The Literary and Numismatic Evidence Reviewed". In Casey, P. J. (ed.). The End of Roman Britain: Papers Arising from a Conference Held at the University of Durham, January 1978. BAR British Series 71. pp. 15–27.
- Leadbetter, Bill (1998). "The illegitimacy of Constantine and the birth of the tetrarchy". In Lieu, Samuel N. C.; Montserrat, Dominic (eds.). Constantine: History, Historiography and Legend. Routledge. pp. 74–85. ISBN 0-415-10747-4.
- Lee, A.D. (2007). War in Late Antiquity. Blackwell Publishing. ISBN 978-0-631-22925-4.
- Lieu, Sam (1996). "From Constantine to Julian: [John the Monk], Artemii passio (The Ordeal of Artemius, BHG 170-71c, CPG 8082)". In Lieu, Samuel; Montserrat, Dominic (eds.). From Constantine to Julian: Pagan and Byzantine Views: A Source History. Routledge. pp. 210–262. ISBN 0-203-42205-8.
- Omissi, Adrastos (2018). Emperors and Usurpers in the Later Roman Empire: Civil War, Panegyric, and the Construction of Legitimacy. Oxford University Press.
- Potter, David S. (2004). The Roman Empire at Bay, AD 180–395. Routledge. ISBN 0-415-10058-5.
- Tucker, Spencer C., ed. (2010). The Global Chronology of Conflict: From the Ancient World to the Modern Middle East. Vol. One. ABC-CLIO. ISBN 978-1-85109-667-1.
