= Vetranio =

Roman emperor and usurper in 350

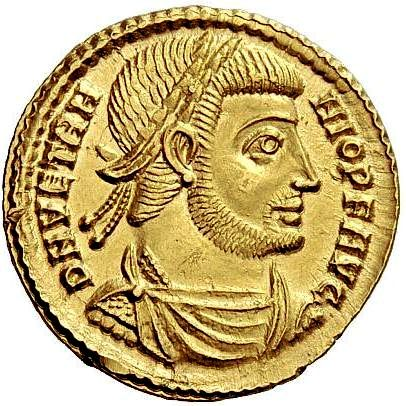
- Obverse of a Solidus of Vetranio

Roman emperor
- Reign: 1 March – 25 December 350
- Predecessor: Constans
- Successor: Constantius II
- Co-emperors: Magnentius; Constantius II
- Born: Moesia
- Died: c. 356; Bithynia

Vetranio (died c. 356 AD) was briefly an imperial usurper and emperor in the Roman Empire in 350, during which time he controlled Illyricum between the rival emperors Magnus Magnentius and Constantius II, eventually capitulating to the latter.

== Life and career ==
=== Early life ===
Vetranio was born in the Roman province of Moesia to low-born parents, sometime in the late 3rd century. His early professions are unknown, but it is evident that at some point he joined the military and must have greatly distinguished himself to rise through the ranks to the army's highest office, magister militum, by emperor Constans, despite being uneducated and unconnected.

He had held this command for a long period of time, and by 350 was considered an officer of both popularity and experience. In early 350, the commander of the famed Ioviani and Herculiani units, Magnus Magnentius, rose in rebellion, assassinated Constans, and had himself crowned as emperor. He quickly asserted control of the western territories, but stopped at the border of Vetranio's province, Illyricum. Three months later, Vetranio was declared emperor by his soldiers. The exact nature of these and ensuing events, and the question of why Vetranio was declared emperor, have puzzled recent historians.

Early historians, such as Edward Gibbon and Otto Seeck, following the account of the 5th century historian Philostorgius, proposed the idea that after the murder of Constans, Constantina, his sister and the daughter of Constantine the Great, asked the aged Vetranio to assume the purple, which he did on 1 March. She most likely thought Vetranio could protect her family and herself against the usurper, and merely hoped to secure his fidelity, though Edward Gibbon credits her notoriously unscrupulous ambition for the scheme, suggesting interested motives on her part. As a member of the imperial family and possibly an Augusta herself, Constantina could have potentially acted as the auctor of imperial authority and legitimately given Vetranio the imperial position. In any case, Constantius II was then embroiled in a dangerous struggle with Shapur II, the king of the Sasanian Empire. Constantina may have doubted her brother's abilities. In modern times, Philostorgius' account of Constantina has been variously argued as either a reliable narrative of value or an anachronistic account from a later period.

There has been a debate over Vetranio's motive. Historian Bruno Bleckmann argues that Vetranio was a genuine usurper in the vein of Magnentius. John Drinkwater points out that because Magnentius extended his territorial control only as far as northern Italy and ceased expanding well before Vetranio was declared emperor, Vetranio's rebellion was not done out of an immediate pressure to keep Magnentius out of Illyricum to secure it for Constantina or Constantius, and was therefore as much a rebellion against Constantius as it was against Magnentius. However, Drinkwater believes that Vetranio was an "unwilling emperor" forced into rebelling by the Danubian troops. In his view, Vetranio ultimately remained loyal to the Constantinian dynasty, and this idea is shared by Alan Dearn, who looked at the numismatic evidence, and Andrastos Omissi. Omissi argues that Vetranio's action was, from the beginning, an emergency measure taken by a Constantinian loyalist to block Magnentius from entering the Balkans and obtaining an easy route to Constantinople.

=== Emperor ===
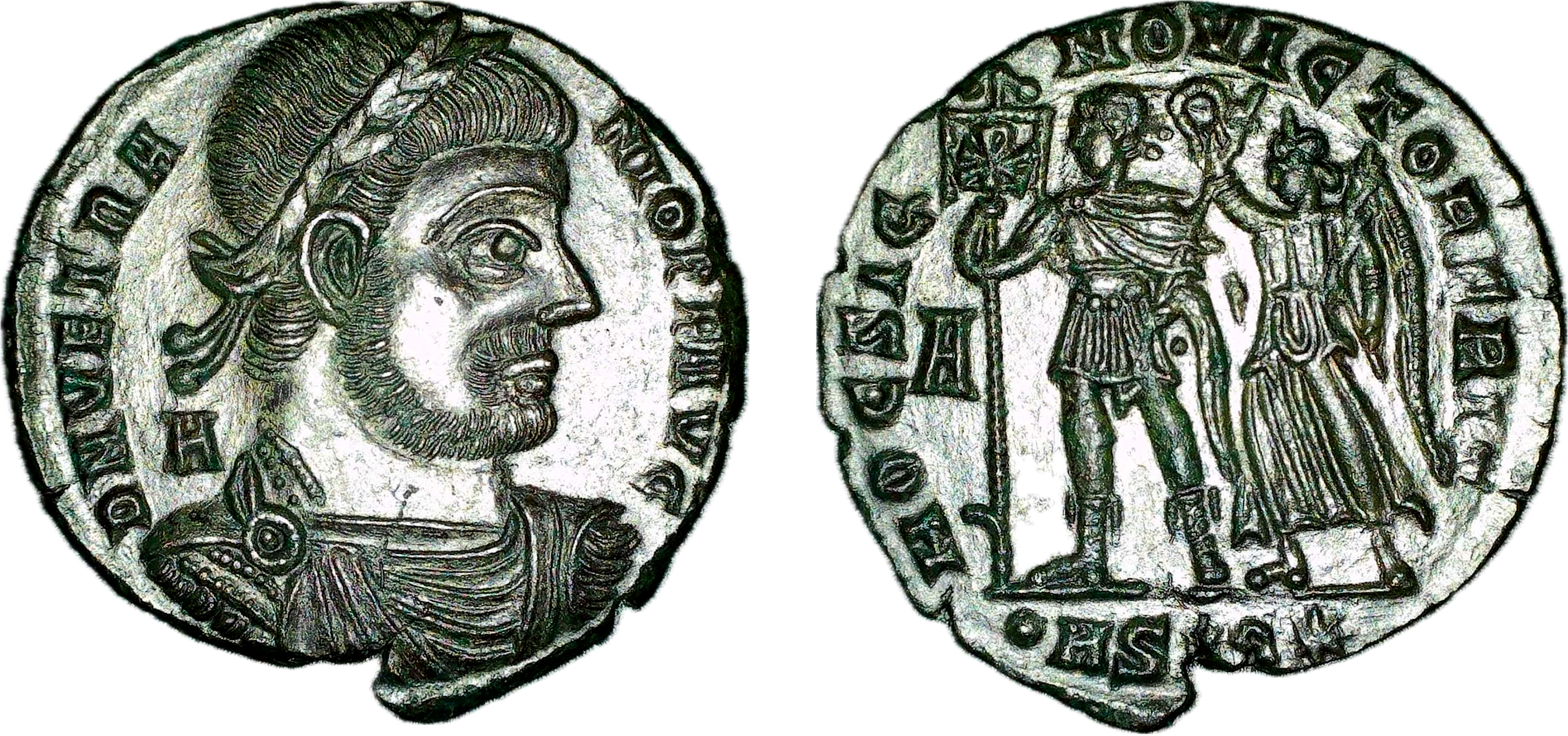
Coin of Vetranio with the reverse legend HOC SIGNO VICTOR ERIS

Vetranio accepted the purple, and coins were minted in his name. Their inscriptions give him the title of Augustus (full emperor), rather than Caesar (heir apparent). The coins he minted had unique images and slogans, an example with the overtly Christian legend of HOC SIGNO VICTOR ERIS (lit. 'With this sign, victor you will be'; cf. In hoc signo vinces). He also minted coins with the common statement of expecting to rule for five years, and hoping to rule for ten (written as VOT(IS) V MUL(TIS) X). Understandings for the sequence of events, and the real motivations behind them, again hinge on whether one believes Vetranio was a Constantinian loyalist or a self-interested usurper. It is clear that Vetranio liaised with Constantius and received some sort of approval and support from him - according to Philostorgius, Constantius sent Vetranio a diadem, and Julian reports that Constantius supported him with money and troops—but then Vetranio also developed a relationship with Magnentius.

Both Vetranio and Magnentius put images of Constantius on their coins and not each other, indicating that they hoped to gain his respect more than the other's. Eventually, Constantius left from the eastern frontier with a large army, and met with ambassadors from both rebel emperors at Heraclea in Thrace. They offered him the senior title in the Empire, and Magnentius proposed to wed his daughter to Constantius, himself to marry Constantina the emperor's sister. But they required that the emperor ratify their claims to the western provinces. Constantius, supposedly inspired by his father Constantine in a nocturnal vision, indignantly declined the offer.

The first rebel Constantius needed to deal with was Vetranio. He had occupied the Succi Pass, an important and defensible thoroughfare on the Via Militaris, close to Serdica. This was the main road on which Constantius must proceed westwards. It is not exactly clear what occurred at the Succi Pass - those who believe Vetranio was loyal to Constantius argue that Vetranio had already organised his eventual surrender to Constantius. Those arguing the contrary note that some primary sources indicate that Vetranio was betrayed by his Praetorian Prefect, Vulcacius Rufinus, who was the envoy who met Constantius at Heraclea, as well as by the officer Gomoarius, who was perhaps in charge of Vetranio's defences at Succi.

If this was not his own secret plan, Vetranio must have now realised his position was untenable. He had lost his best defensive position, most likely a large portion of his army along with its senior officers, and was facing a much larger and more experienced eastern field army. Vetranio's and Constantius' forces met at Serdica under a truce, and then they proceeded to Naissus together. If it had not been negotiated already, there can be no doubt that on this march the emperor and rebel reconciled, while Constantius' agents distributed bribes amongst the armies to ensure their loyalty to Constantius. Then, at Naissus, on 25 December 350, in a contrived scene the two emperors mounted a tribunal to address the assembled legions; Constantius succeeded, by means of a strong speech, in which he invoked the glories of the house of Constantine I, to have the Illyrian legions acclaim him sole emperor. Most likely in a pre-planned show, Vetranio threw himself on the ground and begged Constantius' clemency. The emperor gently raised the aged general by the hand, honoring him with the name of father, and gave him instant pardon.

=== Later life and death ===
Later Vetranio was dismissed from his command and allowed to live the last six years of his life as a private citizen on a state pension in Prusa ad Olympum, Bithynia. During this period he is said to have recommended to Constantius, speaking as a friend, that peace could only be obtained in a private station.

== Sources ==
- Baker-Brian, Nicholas (2023). The Reign of Constantius II. Routledge. ISBN 978-1000619911.
- Bendle, Christopher. 2024. The Office of "Magister Militum" in the 4th Century CE: a Study into the Impact of Political and Military Leadership on the Later Roman Empire. Studies in Ancient Monarchies. Stuttgart: Franz Steiner Verlag. ISBN 978-3-515-13614-3
- Crawford, Peter (2016). Constantius II: Usurpers, Eunuchs, and the Antichrist. Pen & Sword. ISBN 978-1-78340-055-3.
- Dearn, Alan (2003). "The Coinage of Vetranio: Imperial Representation and the Memory of Constantine the Great". The Numismatic Chronicle. 163: 169–191. JSTOR 42667169.
- Drinkwater, John F. (2000). "The revolt and ethnic origin of the usurper Magnentius (350–353), and the rebellion of Vetranio (350)". Chiron. 30: 131–159.
- Hunt, David (1998). "The successors of Constantine". In Averil Cameron & Peter Garnsey (eds.). The Cambridge Ancient History XIII: The Late Empire, A.D. 337–425. Cambridge University Press. ISBN 0-521-30200-5.
- Moser, Muriel (2018). Emperors and Senators in the Reign of Constantius II. Cambridge University Press. ISBN 978-1-1084-8101-4.
- Omissi, Adrastos (2018). Emperors and Usurpers in the Later Roman Empire: Civil War, Panegyric, and the Construction of Legitimacy. Oxford University Press. ISBN 978-0-19-255827-5.

Regnal titles
Preceded by Constans	Roman emperor 350	Succeeded by Constantius II
