= Mursa =

Roman town in Pannonia

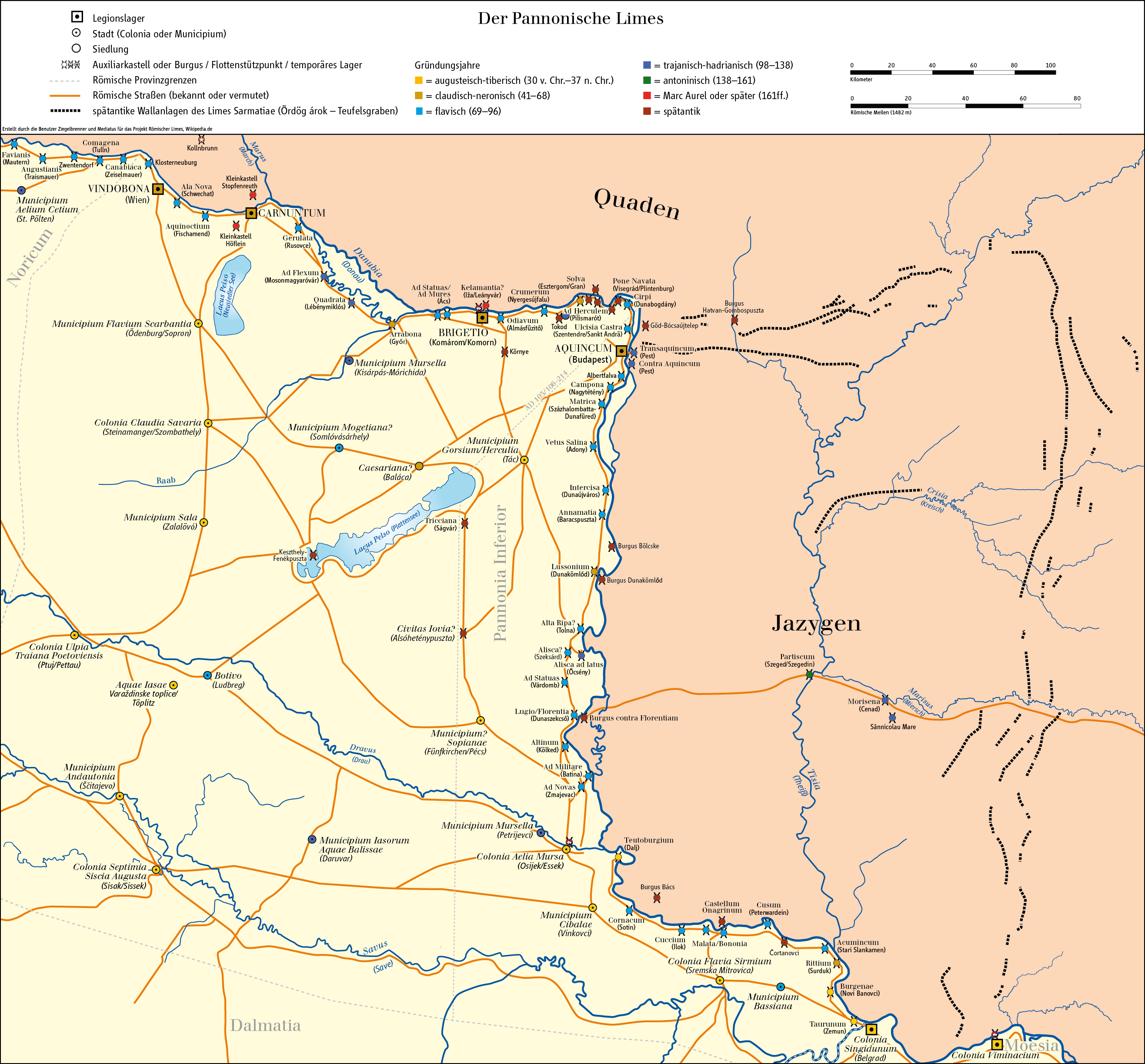
On this map of the Pannonian Limes, Colonia Aelia Mursa is located in the south, on the routes between Poetovio to the west, Sopianae to the north and Cibalae to the south.

Mursa was a Roman town in Pannonia located in today's Osijek, in eastern Croatia.

== History ==
Before the Romans, Mursa was town inhabited by the Andizetes, an Illyrian tribe, and the Celtic Scordisci. It was located near a natural ford over the lower course of the Drava. The settlements were located on elevated grounds, north of a natural swamp created by the Vuka near Palača.

After the conquest of Pannonia, Mursa was under the administration and protection of the Roman 7th legion, which maintained a military castrum at the colony and a bridge over the river Drava. There is evidence that the Roman emperor Hadrian established the settlement from scratch; regardless, he raised Mursa to the status of a colony with special privileges in 133.

Its Roman name was initially Aelia Mursa, later shortened to Mursa, and eventually known as Mursa Major, which may be a form of the pre-existing name. Etymologically, mursa may be a variant of Moras from the Proto-Indo-European word *móri 'sea, marshland' (cf. morass), or it may come from the root mur 'wall', indicating a fortified place.

After that, Mursa had a turbulent history, with several decisive battles that took place in its immediate vicinity, among which the most notable are the battle between Aureolus and Ingenuus in 260 (Note: 260 C.E. is the more generally accepted date, although some sources support the date of 258. See the detailed discussion at Leadbetter (1998) citing, inter alia, Drinkwater (1987)) and particularly the brutal and bloody Battle of Mursa Major in 351. These battles, especially the latter one, had long-term consequences for the colony and the region, which was already under ever-increasing pressure from the invading Goths and other invading tribes.

After the fall of the Western Roman Empire and the destruction of local tribes by the Avar Khaganate in the sixth century, this area was resettled by Slavic tribes.

== Sources ==
- Domić-Kunić, Alka (2006). "Bellum Pannonicum (12. -11. st. pr. Kr.): posljednja faza osvajanja južne Panonije" [Bellum Pannonicum (12-11 BC). The final stage of the conquest of the southern Pannonia]. Journal of the Archaeological Museum in Zagreb (in Croatian). 39 (1) – via Hrčak.
