= Magnentius =

Roman usurper

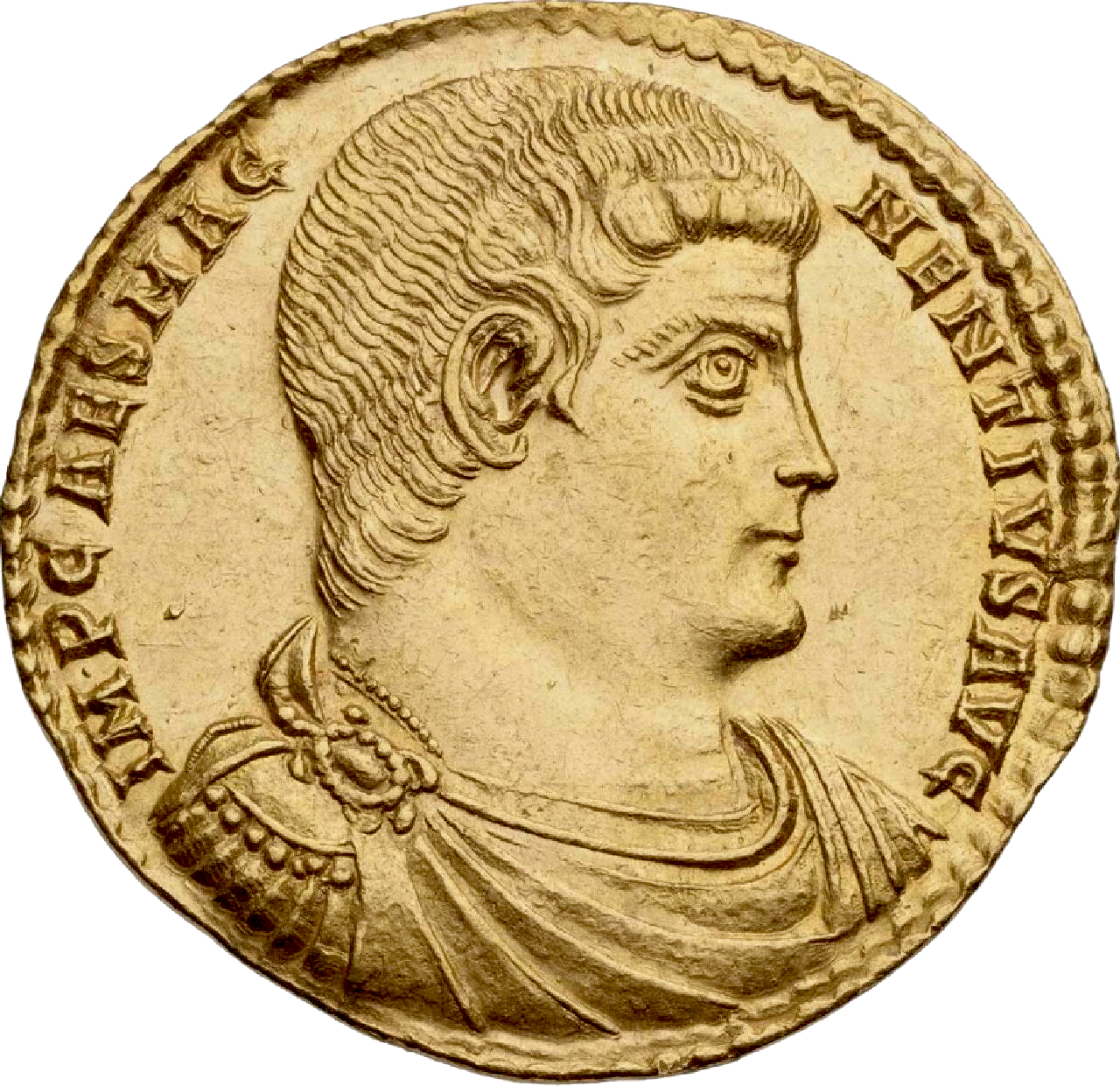
- Medallion (worth 3 solidi) of Magnentius

Roman emperor in the West
- Reign: 18 January 350 – 10 August 353
- Predecessor: Constans
- Successor: Constantius II
- Rivals: Vetranio (350); Nepotianus (350)
- Caesar: Decentius
- Born: c. 303; Samarobriva, Gaul, Roman Empire
- Died: 10 August 353 (aged c. 50); Lugdunum (Lyon), Gaul, Roman Empire
- Spouse: Justina
- Issue: Unnamed daughter (Note: Mentioned only in Peter the Patrician's account.)
Names
- Magnus Magnentius (Note: Though modern scholars often give Magnentius' full name as Flavius Magnus Magnentius, the name Flavius does not appear in any inscription or historian's account; it is only attributed to Magnentius on the basis of a single, now rare, coin minted in Aquileia. Magnentius may have adopted the nomen in an attempt to imitate the Constantinian dynasty. Alternatively, its appearance on the coin may simply be a mistake.)
- Religion: Disputed; See below

Magnus Magnentius (c. 303 – 10 August 353) was a Roman general and usurper against Constantius II. Of Germanic descent, Magnentius served with distinction in Gaul, where the army chose him as a replacement for the unpopular emperor Constans. Acclaimed Augustus on 18 January 350, Magnentius quickly killed Constans and gained control over most of the Western Empire. The Eastern emperor Constantius II, brother of Constans, refused to acknowledge Magnentius's legitimacy, leading to three years of civil war. Decisively defeated at the Battle of Mons Seleucus, Magnentius killed himself on 10 August 353.

Much of Magnentius's short reign was concerned with asserting his legitimacy. Unlike Constans, Magnentius was unrelated to Constantine the Great, and so had no dynastic claim to the emperorship. Magnentius instead sought popular support by modeling himself as a liberator who had freed the Western Empire from the tyranny of Constans. He attempted various public and religious reforms, but almost all his acts were quickly repealed by Constantius after his death. Though Magnentius was accepted as emperor by the Western provinces, Magnentius's reign was condemned as an illegitimate barbarian usurpation by the succeeding Constantinian government. This, together with his failure to neutralize the civil war against him, has led to modern historians designation Magnentius as a usurper or "usurping emperor" rather than a full emperor in the ordinary imperial succession.

Perhaps the most important consequence of Magnentius's revolt was the severe depletion of the Empire's military forces in civil war: The Battle of Mursa left so many Roman soldiers dead that, according to Zosimus, Constantius feared that Rome would no longer be able to effectively hold off barbarian invasions. Following his death, Constantius II became the sole emperor of the Roman Empire.

== Early life and accession ==
Born in Samarobriva (Amiens), Gaul, Magnentius was purportedly the son of a British father and a Frankish mother, though some scholars suspect that his supposed origins were exaggerated or invented as a result of Constantinian propaganda. (Note: For instance, Julian portrayed him as a barbarian invader rather than a usurper in his panegyric for Constantius II.) He served in the protectores, a prestigious bodyguard corps attached to the imperial retinue, and was promoted to comes of the Herculians and Jovians, the Imperial guard units. Magnentius seems to have been effective in his post and to have been well-liked by other important court officials, notably Marcellinus, the comes rerum privatarum, who supported his usurpation.

Court officials eventually hatched a plot to overthrow Constans and place Magnentius in power. By 350, Constans was likely deeply unpopular; ancient sources deride him as licentious, incompetent, and homosexual. There is confusion as to the details, but in Augustodunum (Autun) on 18 January 350 Magnentius announced his bid for power by attending a dinner party, stepping out for a moment, and re-entering the room in a purple toga (the traditional dress of an emperor). The party-goers, either all or in part in on the plot, hailed him Augustus.

In the days following his acclamation, Magnentius bribed the city guard to secure their loyalty and barred residents of Augustodunum from leaving the city to prevent the spread of the news. Anxious to eliminate Constans—who was then hunting near the Pyrenees away from his forces—Magnentius sent a contingent to run him down, and Constans was killed at Helena (near Perpignan). Zosimus claims this force was headed by Gaiso, and that his consulship in 351 was a reward for this act.

== Usurper ==
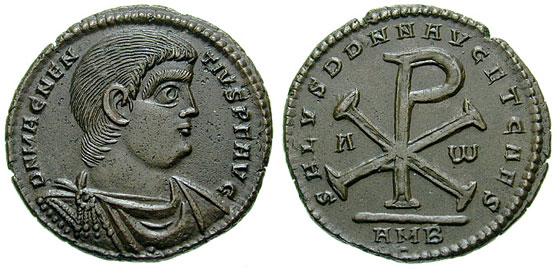
Centenionalis of Magnentius, marked: dn magnentivs p f avg / salvs dd nn avg et caes. x p, a ω, amb

Magnentius quickly attracted the loyalty of the provinces of Britannia, Gaul, and Hispania, and immediately moved to control Italy. He did so within a month of his ascension, appointing Fabius Titianus to the position of praefectus urbis to govern Rome. He seems to have secured Africa quickly as well, thus inheriting all of Constans' former territory except Illyria (which would shortly come under the control of Vetranio).

Magnentius' early reign is marked by a series of bids for political legitimacy. Lacking a connection to the Constantinian dynasty, Magnentius married Justina, possibly a great-granddaughter of Constantine (and future wife of Valentinian). Magnentius attempted to create an image of himself as a liberator, and minted coins with such inscriptions as 'liberator of the Roman world.' Further, Magnentius seems to have initially pursued a policy of diplomacy with Constantius, hoping to induce the emperor to recognize him officially: for the first six months of his reign, Magnentius spoke of Constantius as his senior and minted coins bearing his image. Magnentius also appealed to the controversial bishop Athanasius—who in the end chose to side with Constantius—and repealed some of Constans' restrictions on pagan sacrifice in Italy. This latter decision, aimed at winning the support of wealthy Italian pagans, proved to be a rather crude political maneuver, and earned Magnentius a reputation as a pagan himself.

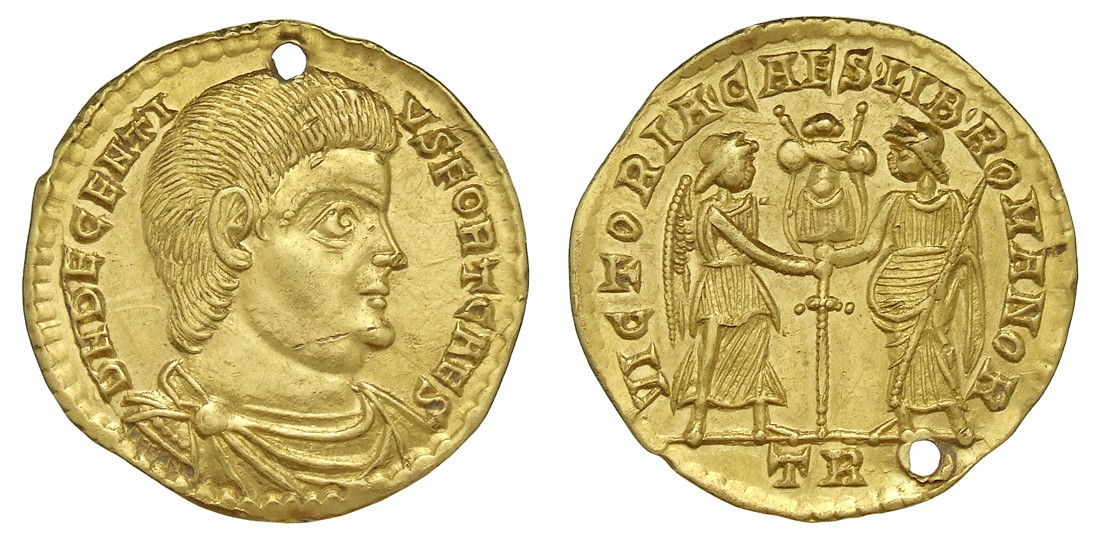
Solidus of Decentius marked: dn decentivs fort caes / victoria caes lib romanor

Despite his efforts Magnentius remained politically vulnerable. Constantius reasoned that legitimizing the man who murdered his brother would set an unacceptable precedent, and so prepared to march West. In Italy, Magnentius' hold over Rome proved tenuous, and Julius Nepotianus, Constantine's nephew, took and held the city for 27 days. Magnentius dispatched Marcellinus (now promoted to magister officiorum) to retake the city. In Illyria, Vetranio was acclaimed emperor with the support of Constantius' sister Constantina on 1 March 350. Though he publicly allied with Magnentius, many modern scholars contend that Vetranio was working for Constantius from the beginning, preventing Magnentius from threatening Constantinople until Constantius could march West.

There is little evidence to suggest that Magnentius' rule was tyrannical or unjust. In a funeral oration for the emperor Julian, the orator Libanius concedes that Magnentius "governed [the empire] in accordance with the laws." This, along with the speed with which he attracted the provinces of Britain and Hispania, may indicate that his administration was relatively competent.

== Civil war ==
By the summer of 350 it had become clear that war was inevitable between Constantius and Magnentius. Magnentius had already moved east over the spring, and appointed his brother Decentius as caesar to control Gaul during his absence. In the East, Constantius was tied down for most of 350 in his war against the Persians. However, in the autumn of 350 Constantius successfully lifted the Persian siege of Nisibis and forged a nominal peace with the Sasanids. Appointing Constantius Gallus caesar and entrusting command of the Eastern legions to Lucillianus, Constantius moved West. On 25 December 350 he accepted Vetranio's resignation in Illyria.

Constantius and Magnentius wintered far apart, and, in the early months of 351, both parties flirted with the idea of peace. Constantius offered Magnentius control of Gaul, which Magnentius rejected. Magnentius' force may have been slowly deserting him, for he seems to have pushed for a battle: either the night before the battle or long before (accounts conflict) the important commander Silvanus defected to Constantius. After failing to take the city of Mursa, Magnentius' force was approached by Constantius', and the Battle of Mursa Major ensued. Constantius won a Pyrrhic victory in one of the largest battles ever fought among Romans: low estimates suggest there were over 50,000 deaths. The sight of the field is reported to have reduced Constantius to tears, and to have made him fear that Rome would be unable to resist barbarian invasion. Contemporary commentators like Eutropius lament the waste of Roman soldiers, noting that enough men for an entire foreign invasion were lost.

== Demise ==
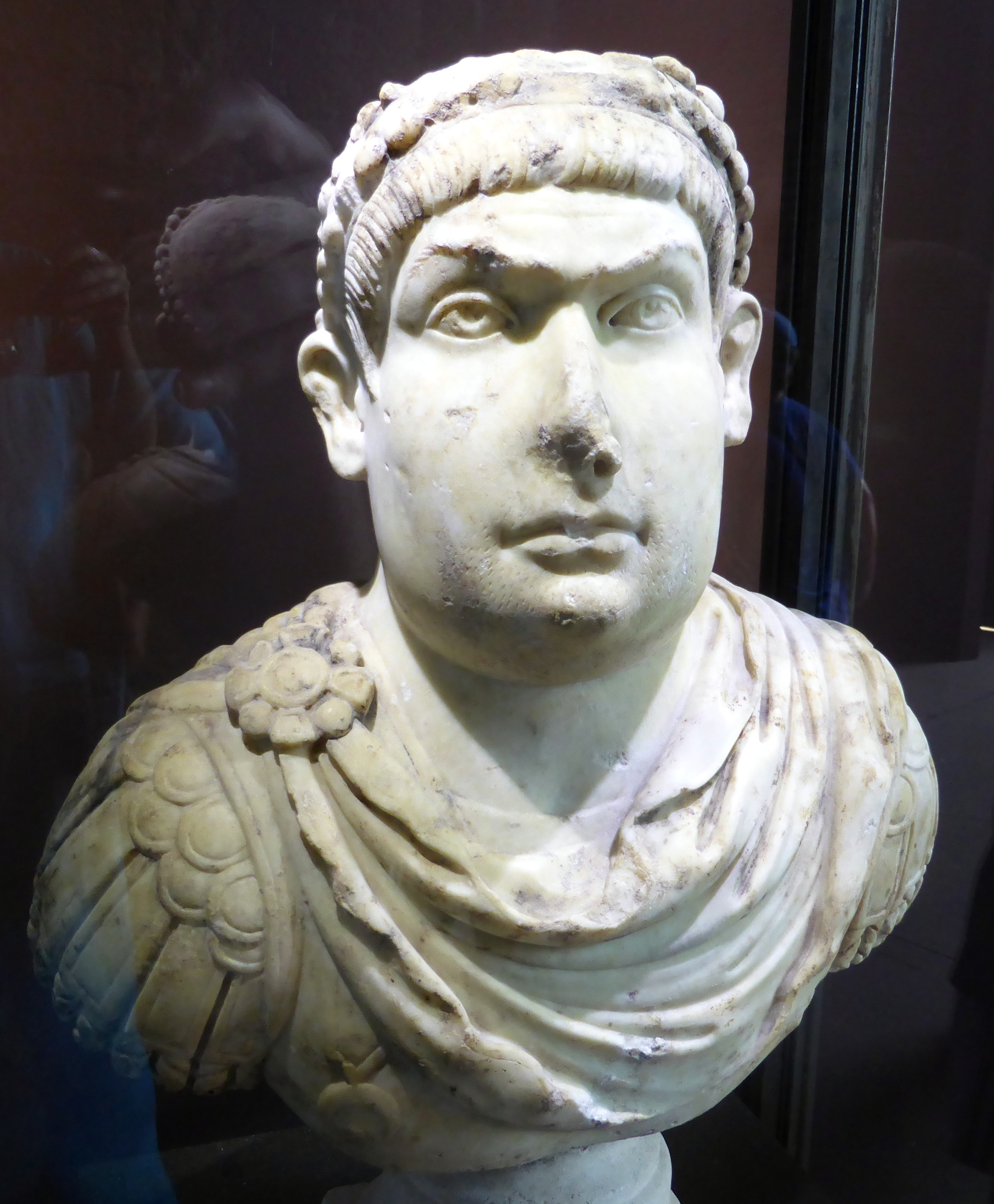
Marble bust of a 4th-century emperor, most likely Magnentius.

Magnentius retreated across the Alps, perhaps after being prevented from entering Italy by the erection of garrisons loyal to Constantius. Magnentius blocked the passages West, and Constantius engaged in skirmishes with the barbarians to the Northeast for the rest of the year.

The year 352 is marked by Magnentius' failed attempts to broker a peace with Constantius: Magnentius sent an embassy to Constantius who, worried about espionage, prevented them reaching him. Magnentius then sent an assembly of bishops with the message that he was willing to step down and take a soldier's posting under Constantius. Constantius rejected this offer as well. Magnentius' legions along the Rhine began defecting en masse, access to northern Gaul and Spain was blocked, and, in the end, he was unable to effectively prevent defection even in his camp.

At some time in the year 353, Magnentius may have attempted to assassinate Constantius Gallus, Constantius' caesar, in a bid to open the Eastern empire to attack. The incident is mentioned only in the account of Zonaras, though some scholars see a passage in Ammianus Marcellinus as corroborating it. However, some modern scholars have claimed that Zonaras' account contains chronological problems, and thus the historicity of this event is uncertain. In any case, if the plot did exist, it was foiled, as Gallus outlived the civil war.

Constantius crossed the Alps in 353, and Magnentius made a final stand in July of the same year at the Battle of Mons Seleucus, after which he fled to Lugdunum (Lyon). There, some sources report that his home was surrounded by the forces of Constantius and that he lashed out against his brother Desiderius. (Note: Desiderius' existence is disputed; he is mentioned only by Zonaras, perhaps trying to harmonize sources now lost to us.) However, most sources agree that on 10 August 353 he died by suicide, falling on his sword. His brother Decentius hanged himself when he received the news.

Following the suppression of Magnentius' rebellion, Constantius began to root out his followers. The most notorious agent he employed in this search was the primicerius notariorum Paulus Catena ("Paul the Chain").

== Religion ==
Magnentius' religious beliefs remain a point of contention among scholars. Many argue that Magnentius was, at least nominally, a Christian. However, some sources hint at a pagan restoration during his short reign. Epigraphic evidence suggests that he allowed pagans to perform sacrifices at night, a practice that had been banned by Constans. Philostorgius describes Magnentius as a demon worshiper, and Zonaras recounts a story of him using black magic. Numismatically, Magnentius' coinage is neither distinctively pagan nor Christian, with the exception of a series of coins bearing a Christogram. This symbol has come to be associated solely with Christianity, but this may not reflect attitudes at the time: MacMullen argues that Magnentius was a Pagan, and that the Chi-Rho had been so de-Christianized by the mid fourth century that he could use it freely.

== Sources ==
- Barnes, Timothy David (1993). Athanasius and Constantius: theology and politics in the Constantinian empire. Cambridge, Mass.: Harvard University Press. pp. 101–108. ISBN 0-674-05067-3.
- Britannica, The Editors of Encyclopaedia, ed. (7 August 2021). "Magnentius". Encyclopedia Britannica.
- (in French) Pierre Bastien (numismat), Le Monnayage de Magnence (350–353), Wetteren (Belgium), Édition numismatique romaine, 1983
- Cohen, Henry (1892). Description Historique des Monnaies Frappées Sous L'Empire Romain Communément Appelées Médailles Impériales (PDF). Vol. VIII. Paris: Rollin & Feuardent, Editeurs, Reu de Louvois, 4.
- Crawford, Peter (2016). Constantius II: Usurpers, Eunuchs, and the Antichrist. Pen & Sword. ISBN 978-1-78340-055-3.
- DiMaio, Michael (1988). "Smoke in the Wind: Zonoras' use of Philostorgius, Zosimus, John of Antioch, and John of Rhodes in his Narrative on the Neo-Flavian Emperors". Byzantion. 58 (1). Peeters Publishers: 230–255. JSTOR 44171050.
- Drinkwater, John F. (2000). "The revolt and ethnic origin of the usurper Magnentius (350–353), and the rebellion of Vetranio (350)". Chiron. 30: 131–159.
- Drinkwater, John F. (2022). "The battle of Mursa, 351: causes, course, and consequences". Journal of Late Antiquity. 15: 131–159. doi:10.1353/jla.2022.0001. S2CID 247442626.
- Enßlin, Wilhelm (1928). "Magnentius (1)" (PNG). Paulys Realencyclopädie der classischen Altertumswissenschaft (in German). Vol. XIV.1.
- Eutropius (1886). Abridgement of Roman History. Translated by Watson, John Selby. London: George Bell and Sons. X.9–12.
- Finney, Paul Corby, ed. (2017). The Eerdmans Encyclopedia of Early Christian Art and Archaeology. Vol. 1. Grand Rapids, Michigan: William V. Eerdmans Publishing Company. ISBN 9780802890160.
- Frakes, Robert M. (1997). "Ammianus Marcellinus and Zonaras on a Late Roman Assassination Plot". Historia: Zeitschrift für Alte Geschichte. 46 (1): 121–28. JSTOR 4436456.
- Hunt, David (1998). "The successors of Constantine". In Averil Cameron & Peter Garnsey (eds.). The Cambridge Ancient History XIII: The Late Empire, A.D. 337–425. Cambridge University Press. ISBN 0-521-30200-5.
- Hunt, E. D. (22 December 2015). "Magnentius, Flavius Magnus". Oxford Classical Dictionary. Oxford University Press.
- Jones, A.H.M.; J.R. Martindale & J. Morris (1971). Prosopography of the Later Roman Empire. Vol. 1. Cambridge University Press. ISBN 0-521-07233-6.
- Jones, A. H. M. (1964). The Later Roman Empire 284–602: A Social Economic and Administrative Survey. Vol. I. Oxford: OxfordBasil Blackwell and MOtt Ltd.
- Julian (1913). The works of the Emperor Julian. Translated by Wright, Wilmer Cave. London: W. Heinenmann. Orations 1.37–41. ISBN 0-674-99014-5.
- Kaldellis, Anthony (2024). The New Roman Empire: A History of Byzantium. Oxford University Press. ISBN 9780197549322.
- Libanius (1888). Julian the Emperor: Containing Gregory Nazianzen's Two Invectives and Libanius' Monody with Julian's Extant Theosophical Works. Translated by C. W. King. London: George Bell and Sons. p. 132 f.
- Labrousse, Michel (1958). "Deux milliaires de la route romaine de Toulouse à Narbonne". Pallas (in French). 6 (3): 55–78. doi:10.3406/palla.1958.947. JSTOR 43605390.
- MacMullen, Ramsay (1977). Christianizing the Roman Empire: (A.D. 100–400). Yale University Press. ISBN 0300036426.
- Rubin, Zeev (1998). "Pagan Propaganda during the Userpation of Magnentius". Scripta Classica Israelica. 17: 124–142.
- Seeck, Otto (1919). "Regesten". Regesten der Kaiser und Päpste für die Jahre 311 bis 476 n. Chr. Vorarbeit zu einer Prosopographie der christlichen Kaiserzeit (in German). J. B. Metzersche Verlagscuchhandlung. pp. 198–199. OCLC 427874626.
- Sozomen (1855). The Ecclesiastical History of Sozomen: Comprising a History of the Church from A.D. 324 to A.D. 440. Genry G. Bohn. p. 153. ISBN 9780790565682.
- Aurelius Victor (1994). Liber De Caesaribus of Sextus Aurelius Victor. Liverpool University Press. pp. 50–53. ISBN 0-85323-218-0.
- Zosimus (2017). New History. Translated by Ridley, Ronald T. Brill: Leiden. 2.43–55. ISBN 978-90-04-34458-7. OCLC 1003488833.
- Zonaras, Joannes (2009). The History of Zonaras : from Alexander Severus to the death of Theodosius the Great. Translated by Banchich, Thomas M.; Lane, Eugene N. Milton Park, Abingdon, Oxon [England]: Routledge. pp. 159–166, 210–217. ISBN 978-0-415-29909-1. OCLC 166383930.

Regnal titles
| Preceded by Constans | Roman emperor 350–353; With: Constantius II; Vetranio | Succeeded by Constantius II |
Political offices
| Preceded by Sergius; Nigrinianus | Roman consul 351 with Gaiso | Succeeded by Decentius Caesar; Paulus |
