= Post-reform radiate =

Roman coin type

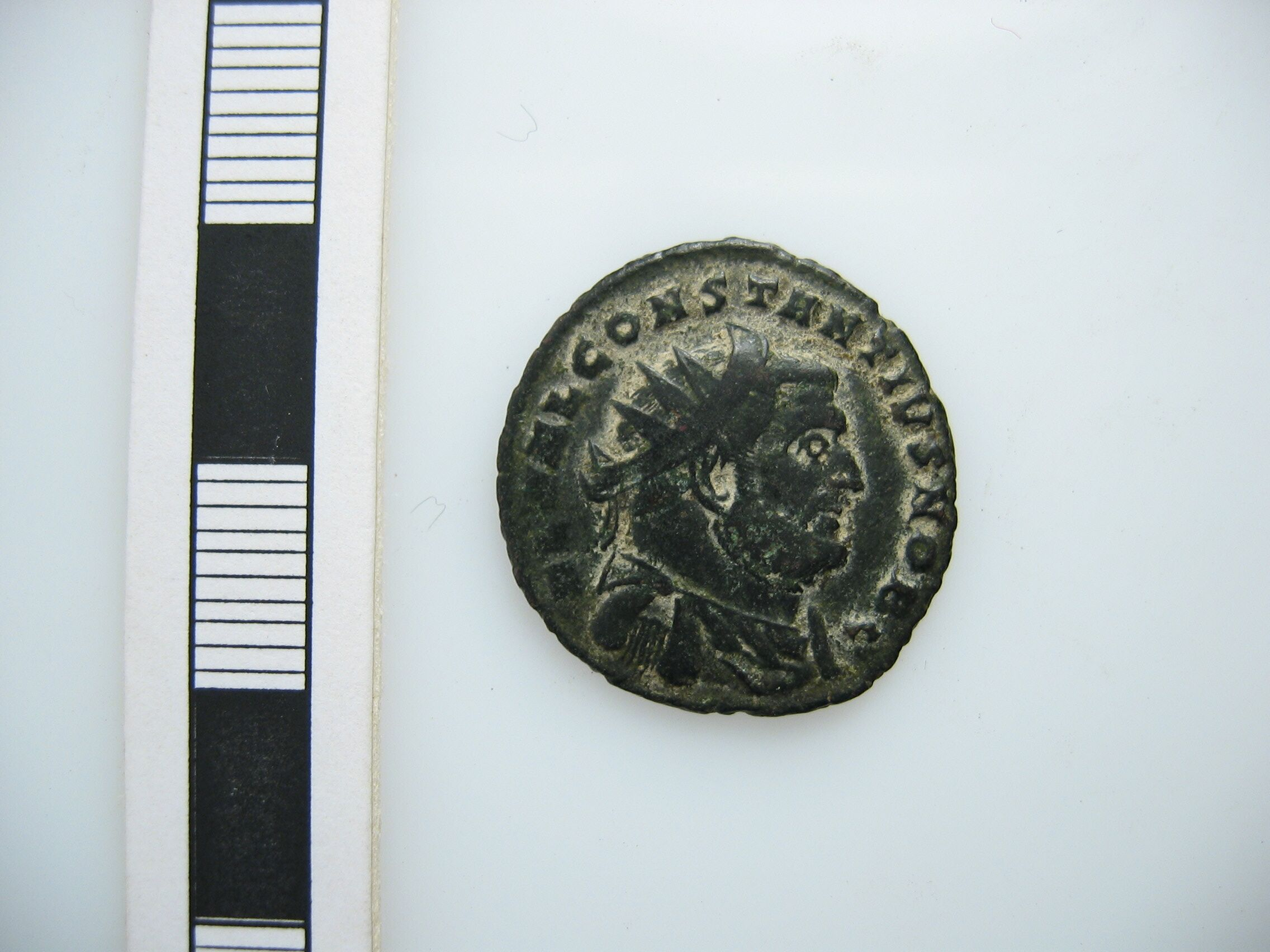
A Roman copper alloy radiate of Constantius I (AD 293–306), dating to c. AD 303. Mint of Carthage. RIC VI, p. 427, no. 35a.

The post-reform radiate (the Latin name, like many Roman coins of this time, is unknown), was a Roman coin first issued by Diocletian during his currency reforms. The radiate looked very similar to the antoninianus (pre-reform radiate), with a radiate crown, similar to the one worn by the Roman deity, Sol Invictus. It is different from the Antoninianus because of the absence of the "XXI" that existed on pre-reform radiates, a symbol believed to have indicated a consistence of 20 parts bronze to 1 part silver. The post-reform radiate had little or no silver content. The weight can vary between 2.23 and 3.44 grams.

There also exists radiates of Maximian, Constantius I, and Galerius, Diocletian's co-rulers, in the same style.

== See also ==
- Edict on Maximum Prices

== Bibliography ==
- Radiate on Forumancientcoins Accessed on 13 September 2006
- Doug smith information on denomination Accessed on 13 September 2006
