= Flavius Valerius =

Flavius Valerius may refer to:

- Flavius Valerius Severus (died 307), Roman emperor from 306 to 307
- Flavius Valerius Constantius Chlorus (died 306), Roman emperor from 305 to 306
- Flavius Valerius Constantinus, or Constantine the Great (died 337), Roman emperor from 306 to 337
