= Gaius Annius Anullinus =

Roman senator

Gaius Annius Anullinus (died 4th century) was a Roman senator who was appointed consul in AD 295.

== Biography ==
A member of a family which originated in Africa and a pagan, Anullinus’ early career is unknown. A leading figure of Rome's urban aristocracy, he was possibly the son of the senator Anullinus, who allegedly freed the future emperor Diocletian’s father from slavery. He first appears as the consul posterior alongside Nummius Tuscus in 295. From 1 July 302 to 1 July 305, Anullinus was the Proconsular governor of Africa Proconsularis.

During his time there, he implemented the edicts against the Christians as decreed by the emperor Diocletian. He travelled across the province, stopping at towns and holding judicial hearings, and enforcing the letter of the law. He ordered the execution of Felix, Bishop of Tibiuca, who refused to hand over copies of the Christian scriptures to the authorities. He oversaw the execution of the Martyrs of Abitinae and he also ordered the execution of Crispina of Thagara, after presiding over a trial where she refused to sacrifice to the Roman gods. Anullinus passed sentence on the three virgins of Tuburga, and possibly Perpetua.

Ultimately, however, he attempted to maintain some balance between convincing the imperial courts of his adherence in enforcing their decrees, and convincing the local population that he was doing his job only to the limited extent that was necessary, and not so zealously that it would impact his ability to govern the province peacefully. Regardless, after the persecutions were over, the monuments and buildings erected by him during his time as governor were purposely defaced by the local Christians.

In 306, Anullinus was appointed praefectus urbi (urban prefect) of Rome, a post he held from 19 March 306 to 27 August 307. Although he was appointed by the emperor Severus, he eventually abandoned Severus and conspired with the Praetorian prefect and the tribunus fori suarii of the Cohortes urbanae, Lucianus, to install the Roman usurper Maxentius.

Maxentius later appointed Anullinus Urban Prefect for a second time, apparently as an attempt to garner good fortune prior to his upcoming clash against his rival, Constantine I. Anullinus held the post from 27 October to 29 November 312. He was appointed the day before Maxentius was defeated by Constantine I at the Battle of the Milvian Bridge, and greeted Constantine when he entered Rome on his second day as Prefect. Constantine kept him on in the office throughout November.

Under Constantine, he continued his service to the state despite the change in regime. In 313, he was ordered by Constantine to restore the properties of the Catholic Church. but continued his persecution of the Donatists. In the lead-up to the Council of Arles in 314, Anullinus reported on Caecilianus, the bishop of Carthage.

Sometime during the reign of Maxentius, Anullinus and 12 other senators each contributed 400,000 sesterces, probably for the construction of a building in Rome.

== See also ==
- List of Roman consuls

Political offices
| Preceded by Flavius Valerius Constantius; Gaius Galerius Valerius Maximianus | Consul of the Roman Empire; 295 with Nummius Tuscus | Succeeded by Gaius Aurelius Valerius Diocletianus VI; Flavius Valerius Constantius II |
| Preceded by Titus Flavius Postumius Titianus | Praefectus urbi of Rome; March 306 – August 307 | Succeeded by Attius Insteius Tertullus |
| Preceded by Aradius Rufinus | Praefectus urbi of Rome; October – November 312 | Succeeded by Aradius Rufinus |

== Sources ==
- Chastagnol, André, Les Fastes de la Prefecture de Rome au Bas-Empire (1962)
- Martindale, J. R.; Jones, A. H. M, The Prosopography of the Later Roman Empire, Vol. I AD 260–395, Cambridge University Press (1971)
- Rees, Roger (2004). Diocletian and the Tetrarchy. Edinburgh, UK: Edinburgh University Press. ISBN 9780748616602.
- Potter, David, S., The Roman Empire at Bay: AD 180-395 (2004)
- Shaw, Brent D., Sacred Violence: African Christians and Sectarian Hatred in the Age of Augustine (2011)
