= Virius Nepotianus =

Roman statesman and Consul of the Roman Empire

Virius Nepotianus was a Roman statesman who served as Consul of the Roman Empire in 336. He is believed to have been the husband of princess Eutropia and father of the usurper Nepotianus.

== See also ==
- Viria gens

Political offices
Preceded by Flavius Valerius Constantinus Caesar III; Gaius Galerius Valerius Maximianus Caesar III	Consul of the Roman Empire; 301 with Titus Flavius Postumius Titianus	Succeeded by Flavius Valerius Constantinus Caesar IV; Gaius Galerius Valerius Maximianus Caesar IV
