= Edict on Maximum Prices =

301 edict issued by Diocletian

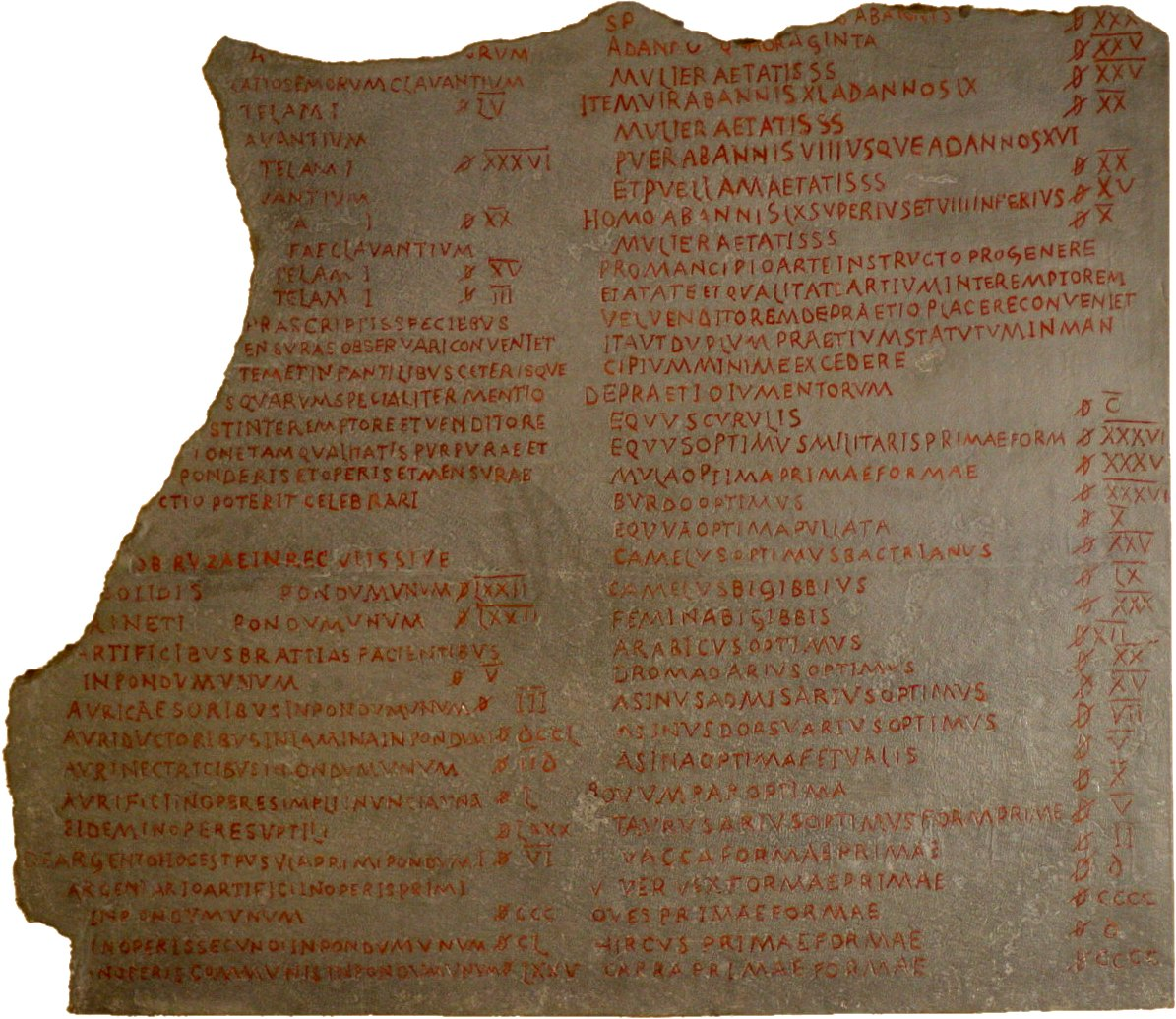
Modern painted cast of one of the copies of the edict (Antikensammlung Berlin)

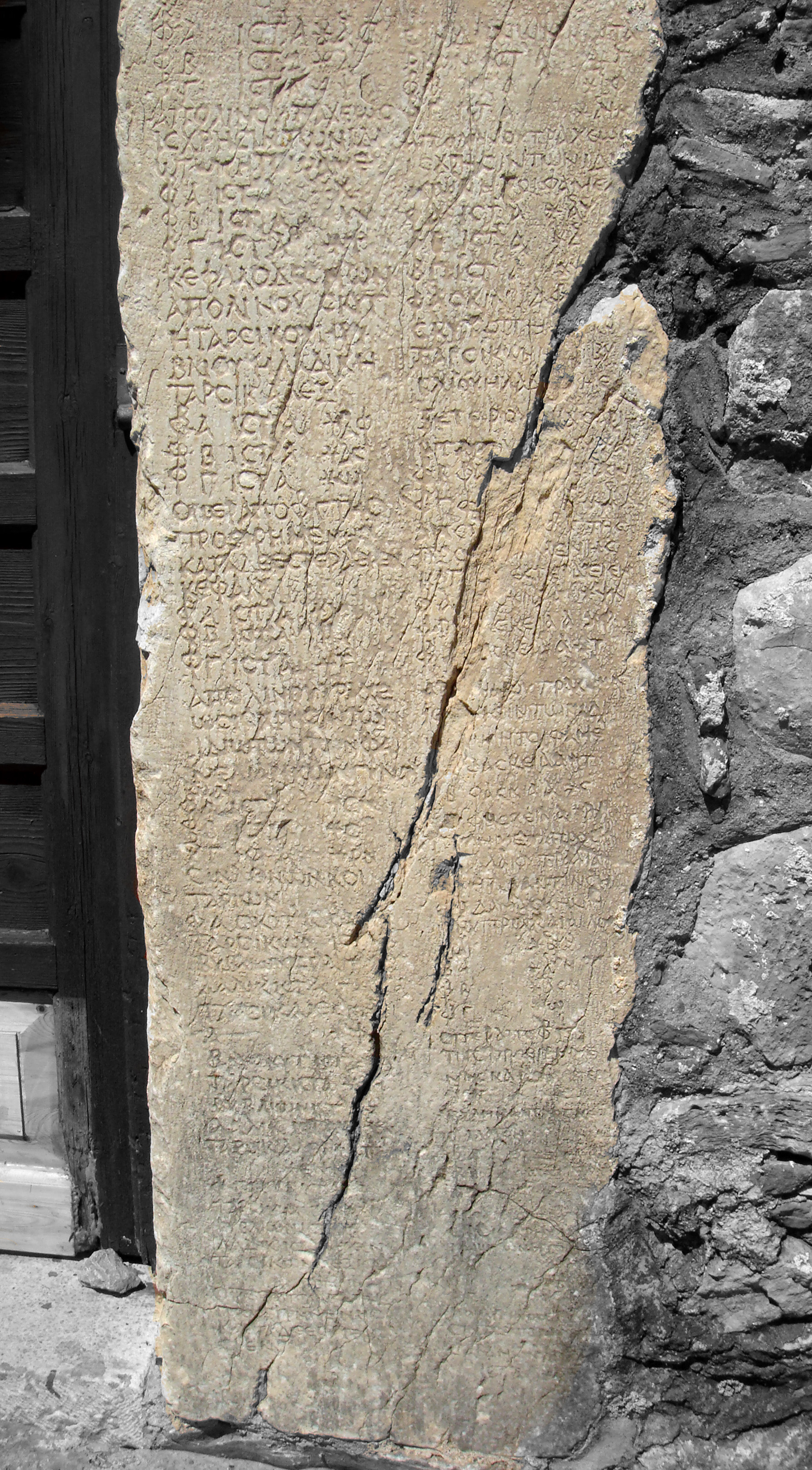
One of four pieces of the edict (in Greek) re-used in the door frame of the medieval Church of St. John Chrysostomos in Geraki

The Edict on Maximum Prices (Latin: Edictum de Pretiis Rerum Venalium, "Edict Concerning the Sale Price of Goods"; also known as the Edict on Prices or the Edict of Diocletian) was issued in 301 by Diocletian. The document denounces greed and sets maximum prices and wages for all important articles and services.

The Edict exists only in fragments found mainly in the eastern part of the empire, where Diocletian ruled. The reconstructed fragments have been sufficient to estimate many prices for goods and services for historical economists (although the Edict attempts to set maximum prices, not fixed ones). It was probably issued from Antioch or Alexandria and was set up in inscriptions in Greek and Latin.

The Edict on Maximum Prices is still the longest surviving piece of legislation from the period of the Tetrarchy. The Edict was criticized by Lactantius, a rhetorician from Nicomedia, who blamed the emperors for the inflation and told of fighting and bloodshed that erupted from price tampering. Scholars generally agree that the Edict was patchily enforced and of limited success in ending inflation. By the end of Diocletian's reign in 305, it was mostly ignored and may have been formally abrogated. The Roman economy as a whole was not substantively stabilized until Constantine's coinage reforms in the 310s.

== History ==
During the Crisis of the Third Century, Roman coinage had been greatly debased by the numerous emperors and usurpers who minted their own coins, using base metals to reduce the underlying metallic value of coins used to pay soldiers and public officials.

Earlier in his reign, as well as in 301 around the same time as the Edict on Prices, Diocletian issued Currency Decrees, which attempted to reform the system of taxation and to stabilize the coinage.

It is difficult to know exactly how the coinage was changed, as the values and even the names of coins are often unknown or have been lost in the historical record. Following a time of constant wars for power the reigning authorities looking for campaign resources made a series of changes; Diocletian set the value of coins for saving expenses altering the amount of silver contained in them from 50% and a weight of 5 grams per coin to 1% silver and 3 grams weight producing a huge rise in prices.

In the edict of Diocletian, it was mentioned that the wine from Picenum was the most expensive wine, together with Falerno. Vinum Hadrianum was produced in Picenum, in the city of Hatria or Hadria, the old city of Atri.

== Rediscovery ==
No complete copy of the decree has been found. The text has been reconstructed from fragments of Greek and Latin copies at a number of different sites, most of them in the eastern provinces of Roman empire: Phrygia and Caria in Asia Minor, mainland Greece, Crete, and Cyrenaica. The version of the decree inscribed on the wall of the bouleuterion at Stratonikeia in Caria was the first to be discovered and copied, by William Sherard, the English consul at Smyrna, in 1709. The first attempt at a composite text was made in 1826 by William Martin Leake, working from Sherard's copy of the Stratonikeia inscription and a fragment purchased in Alexandria and subsequently brought to Aix-en-Provence. A comprehensive edition of all fragments known by the end of the 19th century was edited by Theodor Mommsen with commentary by Hugo Blümner; this edition formed the basis for a new text and English translation published in 1940 by Elsa Graser, who also incorporated fragments found after the publication of Mommsen's edition. Two further critical editions were published in the early 1970s, and new fragments have continued to be discovered.

== Contents ==
Although incomplete, enough of the text is preserved to make the general structure and contents of the edict clear.

=== Coinage ===
All coins in the Decrees and the Edict were valued according to the denarius. Many modern writers refer to the coinage used by Diocletian as the denarius communis, but this phrase is a modern invention and is not found in any ancient text. The argenteus seems to have been set at 100 denarii, the silver-washed nummus at 25 denarii, and the bronze radiate at 4 denarii. The gold aureus was revalued at at least 1,200 denarii.

The first two-thirds of the Edict doubled the value of the copper and billon coins, and set the death penalty for profiteers and speculators, who were blamed for the inflation and who were compared to the barbarian tribes attacking the empire. Merchants were forbidden to take their goods elsewhere and charge a higher price, and transport costs could not be used as an excuse to raise prices.

Each cell represents the ratio of the coin in the column to the coin in the row: thus 1000 denarii were worth 1 solidus.

Diocletian values(301–305 A.D.)
	Solidus	Argenteus	Nummus	Radiate	Laureate	Denarius
Solidus	1	10	40	200	500	1,000
Argenteus	1/10	1	4	20	50	100
Nummus	1/40	1/4	1	5	12 1/2	25
Radiate	1/200	1/20	1/5	1	2 1/2	5
Laureate	1/500	1/50	2/25	2/5	1	2
Denarius	1/1,000	1/100	1/25	1/5	1/2	1

=== Prices ===
The last third of the Edict, divided into 32 sections, imposed a price ceiling – a list of maxima – for well over a thousand products. These products included various food items (beef, grain, wine, beer, sausages, etc.), clothing (shoes, cloaks, etc.), freight charges for sea travel, and weekly wages. The highest limit was on one pound of purple-dyed silk, which was set at 150,000 denarii (the price of a lion was set at the same price).

== Enforcement and effects ==
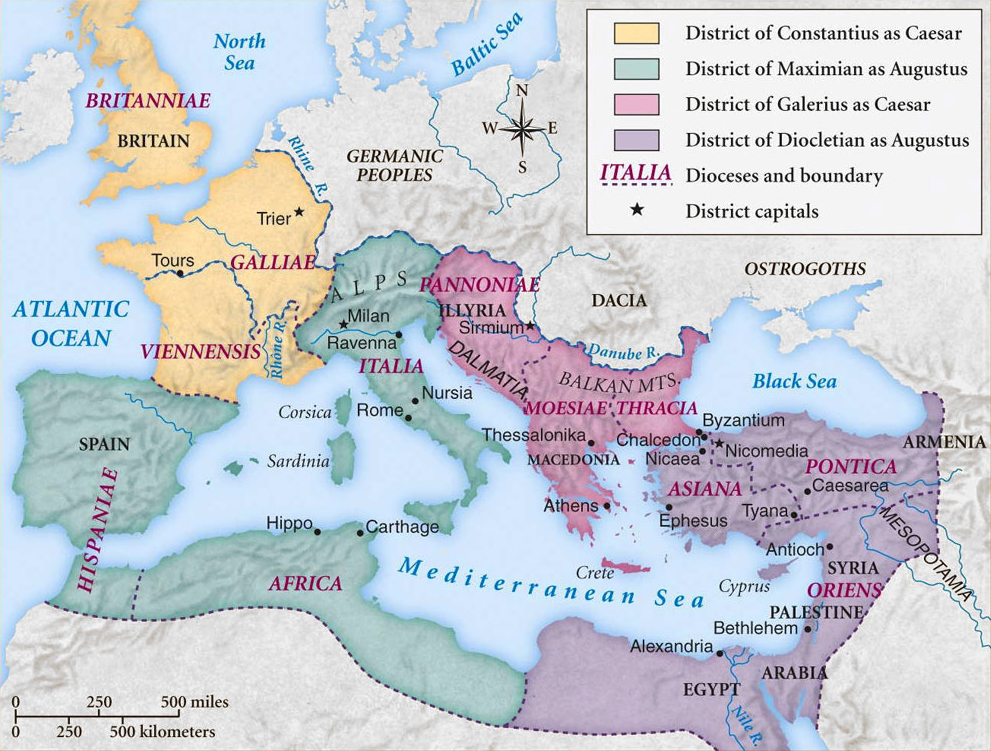
Map of the Empire under the Tetrarchy, showing the four tetrarchs' zones of influence

Under the system known as the Tetrarchy, Diocletian and his junior co-emperor (caesar) Galerius directly governed the Eastern Roman Empire, while Maximian, nominally Diocletian's junior, and his caesar Constantius governed territories in the west. The Edict on Maximum Prices was intended to apply across the whole empire; Diocletian and Galerius enforced it in the east, but its enforcement in the west was left to Maximian and Constantius. The edict can tentatively be said to have been known in Rome in 302, but seems only to have been substantially enforced in the west by Maximian in Africa; Constantius made little effort to implement it. In his study of the tetrarchs' imperial pronouncements, Simon Corcoran judges that the edict was probably not widely circulated outside the eastern empire.

The edict appears to have slowed down inflation, at least temporarily. However, the price maxima set out in the edict were not consistently observed. By reducing sale prices, the edict depressed wages, therefore frustrating one of Diocletian's goals in his reforms of the Roman currency.

The edict seems to have no longer been in force by the time of Diocletian's abdication in 305; Diocletian may have formally abrogated it before this point. Some prices reported in Roman sources from as late as 311 seem to be in line with its maxima, but there is no direct evidence that this was a matter of compliance with the edict as opposed to market prices. Some official transactions, such as the state's procurement of clothing for soldiers, appear to have used the prices set by Diocletian as late as 323.
