= Claudia (mother of Constantius) =

Supposed mother of emperor Constantius Chlorus

Claudia was the purported mother of Roman emperor Constantius Chlorus according to ancient sources. These sources claim her to be a relative of Roman emperors Claudius Gothicus and Quintillus, a claim modern historians tend to view with suspicion. Her name is reported by the source Historia Augusta.

== Attestation ==
The Historia Augusta, an ancient but notoriously unreliable source, states that Constantius' father was a nobleman named Flavius Eutropius and his mother Claudia, who was the daughter of Crispus, the brother of emperors Claudius Gothicus and Quintillus. The historian Zonaras goes even further, writing that Constantius's mother was actually the daughter of Claudius Gothicus himself. Eutropius was uncertain if she was the daughter or sister of Claudius Gothicus. (Note: The Historia Augusta also claims Claudius Gothicus had sisters, one of whom was named "Constantina".)

== Analysis ==
Modern historians have speculated that these connections with Claudius Gothicus and his brother Quintillus were fabricated by Constantius' son Constantine the Great to forge a more prestigious ancestry for himself during his reign, as well as to distance his father's memory from that of his adoptive father emperor Maximian (as well as the rest of the Tetrarchy). Claudius Gothicus had been a well liked emperor who had not been assassinated or killed in battle but died a natural death, he was pagan but hadn't persecuted Christians, and since the myth of him being the bastard son of Gordian II; (Note: Mentioned in the Epitome de Caesaribus.) as well as the claims of him being related to yet another emperor, Probus, existed, he was a good choice for dynastic purposes. It was also convenient because Claudius Gothicus' reign was short and his greatest claim to fame was his military victory near Naissus, close to where Constantine was supposedly born. Giving Claudius's brother the name Crispus may also have been a way to try to explain Constantine's eldest son's name.

Timothy D. Barnes speculated that instead of Claudia the emperor's mother may have been named "Julia Constantia" or similar. Vern L. and Bonnie Bullough have proposed that Constantius Chlorus may have been born from of his parents in a "concubinage" (concubinatus) relationship, instead of in a marriage (conubium), thus explaining why Chlorus himself took his own son Constantinus by his possible concubine Helena (though some historians believe they were in a lawful marriage) as his full heir.

== Legacy ==
Fictional or not, Constantine appears to have wanted to associate himself with Claudius Gothicus and works glorifying him were written in this wake. He also named one of his sons Flavius Claudius Constantinus, and his two other sons who became emperors (Constantius II and Constans) also stressed their connection to their supposed ancestor. Constantine's move to invent fictional ancestry may also have been copied by his brother-in-law and rival emperor Licinius who began to circulate writings that he was descended from emperor Philip the Arab.

== Possible depictions ==
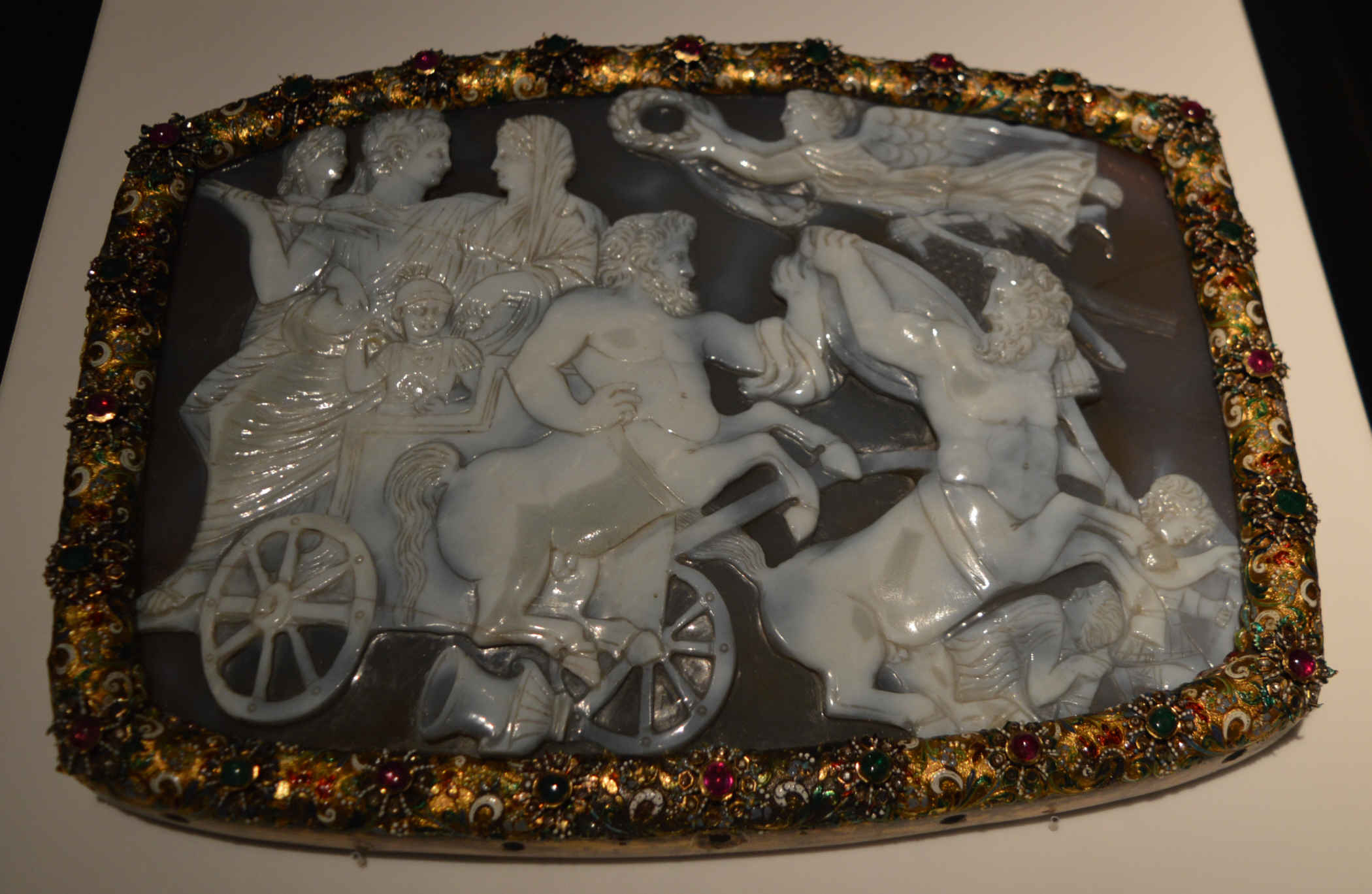
The Gemma Constantiana

The woman standing behind Constantine and pointing at his eldest son Crispus on the Gemma Constantiana has been speculated by several historians to be a depiction of Constantine's grandmother Claudia. Annie Nicolette Zadoks-Josephus Jitta came to this conclusion the second time she analyzed the cameo, and G.M.A. Richter agreed with her. Jitta argued this because the woman depicted wears a typical Claudian headdress (Note: Jitta notes that such wear actually belonged to the time of Claudius "I", not Claudius "II" Gothicus, but that such confused artistry was not unusual in the fourth century.) and is pointing at Crispus, thus attempting to draw attention to the connection with her supposed father also named Crispus, and by proxy Gothicus. Martin Henig also believed the lady to represent Claudia.

== See also ==
- List of Roman women
- Claudia gens
