= Quintillus =

Roman emperor in 270

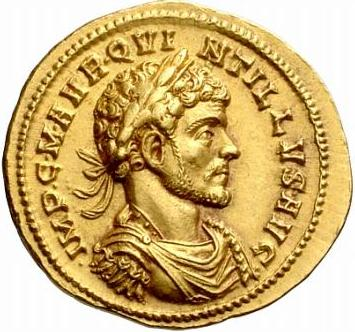
- Aureus depicting Quintillus. Inscription reads IMP C M AVR QVINTILLVS AVG

Roman emperor
- Reign: 270 (17–77 days)
- Predecessor: Claudius Gothicus
- Successor: Aurelian
- Born: Sirmium, Pannonia Inferior (Sremska Mitrovica, Serbia)
- Died: 270; Aquileia, Italy
- Issue: 2 sons
Names
- Marcus Aurelius Claudius Quintillus
Regnal name
- Imperator Caesar Marcus Aurelius Claudius Quintillus Augustus

Quintillus (Latin: Marcus Aurelius Claudius Quintillus; died 270) was Roman emperor in 270. He took power after the death of his brother, Emperor Claudius Gothicus. After reigning for a few weeks Quintillus was overthrown by Aurelian, who had been proclaimed rival emperor by the legions he commanded. The ancient sources variously report him to have killed himself, to have fallen in battle against Aurelian, or to have been murdered by his own soldiers.

== Early life ==
Marcus Aurelius Claudius Quintillus' exact birthplace is unknown. An Illyrian, he was likely born in Pannonia Inferior, as is indicated by his coinage. Originating from a low-born family, Quintillus came to prominence with the accession of his brother Claudius Gothicus to the imperial throne in 268. Quintillus was possibly made Procurator of Sardinia during his brother's reign.

== Reign of Quintillus ==
Quintillus was declared emperor after Claudius died in 270. Eutropius (4th century) reports Quintillus to have been elected by soldiers of the Roman army immediately following the death of his brother; the choice was reportedly approved by the Roman Senate. Joannes Zonaras (12th century) reports him elected by the Senate itself. Records, however, agree that the legions which had followed Claudius in campaigning along the Danube were either unaware or disapproving of Quintillus' elevation. They instead elevated their current leader Aurelian as emperor.

The few records of Quintillus' reign are contradictory. It is variously reported to have lasted 17 days (Jerome, Eutropius and Zonaras), 77 days (Filocalus), or "a few months" (Zosimus). Modern scholars believe "17" to be a misreading of a larger number, since Quintillus had time to produce an abundance of coins. Records also disagree on the cause of his death. The Historia Augusta reports him murdered by his own soldiers in reaction to his strict military discipline. Jerome says that he was slain at Aquileia, without further specifics. According to Joannes Zonaras, Quintillus opened his veins and bled himself to death; John of Antioch concurs, adding that the suicide was assisted by a physician. Claudius Salmasius noted that Dexippus recorded the death without stating causes. All records, however, agree in placing the death at Aquileia. Quintillus was reportedly survived by his two sons.

The Historia Augusta reports Claudius and Quintillus having another brother named Crispus and through him a niece, Claudia, who reportedly married Eutropius and was mother to Constantius Chlorus. Some historians however suspect this account to be a genealogical fabrication to flatter Constantine I.

== Legacy ==
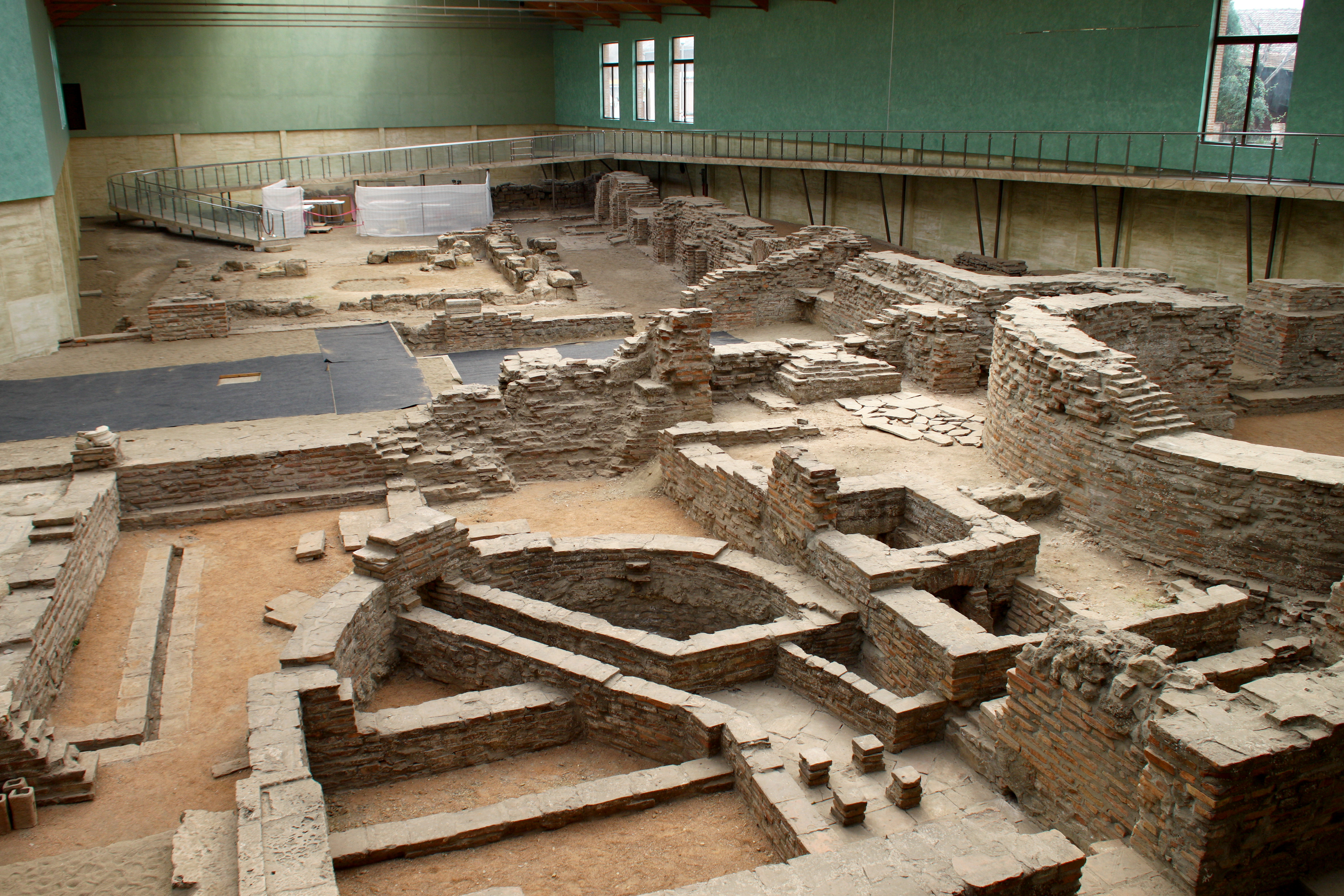
Ruins of Imperial Palace at Sirmium, today in Sremska Mitrovica

His reign was very short and he never managed to visit Rome as emperor. Surviving Roman records considered Quintillus a moderate and capable emperor. He was seen as a champion of the Senate and thus compared to previous emperors Galba and Pertinax. All three were highly regarded by senatorial sources despite their failure to survive a full year of reign. In his reign the priestly offices held by the emperor were separated and the image of the emperor as pontifex maximus was abandoned.

== See also ==
- List of Roman emperors

== Sources ==
=== Ancient sources ===
- Jerome (2005) [c. 380]. Chronicon. Translated by Roger Pearse.
- Aurelius Victor (2018) [c. 400]. Epitome de Caesaribus. Translated by Thomas M. Banchich.
- Eutropius (1853) [c. 380]. Breviarium ab urbe condita. Translated by John Selby Watson.
- "Live of Claudius". Historia Augusta. Translated by David Magie. 1913.
- Joannes Zonaras (2008) [c. 1120]. Epitome Historiarum. Translated by Basileos Nestor. Archived from the original on 21 May 2008.
- Zosimus (1814) [c. 500]. Nova Historia. Translated by J. Davis.

=== Secondary sources ===
- Manders, Erika (2012). Coining Images of Power: Patterns in the Representation of Roman Emperors on Imperial Coinage, A.D. 193-284. BRILL. ISBN 978-9004189706.
- Banchich, Thomas (1999). "Quintillus (270 A.D)". De Imperatoribus Romanis. Archived from the original on 17 March 2022.
- Martindale, John R.; Jones, A. H. M.; Morris, John, eds. (1971). "Quintillus 1". The Prosopography of the Later Roman Empire: Volume I, AD 260–395. Cambridge: Cambridge University Press. p. 759. ISBN 0-521-07233-6.

Regnal titles
Preceded by Claudius II	Roman emperor 270	Succeeded by Aurelian
