= Eutropia (sister of Constantine I) =

Daughter of Constantius I

- Born: after 293
- Died: 350; Rome, Italy
- Spouse: Virius Nepotianus
- Issue: Nepotianus
- Dynasty: Constantinian
- Father: Constantius I
- Mother: Theodora

Eutropia (Greek: Εύτροπία; died 350) was the daughter of Roman emperor Constantius Chlorus and Flavia Maximiana Theodora, and therefore half-sister of Constantine the Great. She was mother of the short-lived imperial pretender Nepotianus, and was probably killed alongside him by the rival usurper Magnentius in 350.

She was married to Virius Nepotianus, who had been consul in 336, and was a favourite of Constantine the Great.

== Death ==
She was murdered in 350 by Magnentius, alongside her son Nepotianus. Her murder is mentioned by Athanasius of Alexandria in his Apologia ad Constantium, written to Emperor Constantius II, among others who were killed by Magnentius:

...butchering those who so kindly entertained me at Rome; for instance, your departed Aunt Eutropia, whose disposition answered to her name.

The source also indicates that she was an acquaintance of Athanasius, who met her when he previously stayed at Rome.
