= Three virgins of Tuburga =

3rd-century Christian martyrs

Saints Maxima, Donatilla, and Secunda

Virgin Martyrs
- Born: c. 240s CE
- Died: 257 CE; Thuburbo Maius, Roman Province of Africa (modern-day Tunisia)
- Venerated in: Eastern Orthodox Church; Roman Catholic Church
- Canonized: Pre-congregation
- Feast: 30 July

The three virgins of Tuburga were a group of young women who were executed for being Christians around 257 AD, in what was Roman Empire–era Tunisia.

Traditionally named Maxima, Donatilla, and Secunda, the trio are venerated as saints in the Eastern Orthodox Church and in the Catholic Church. They are remembered in both churches on 30 July.

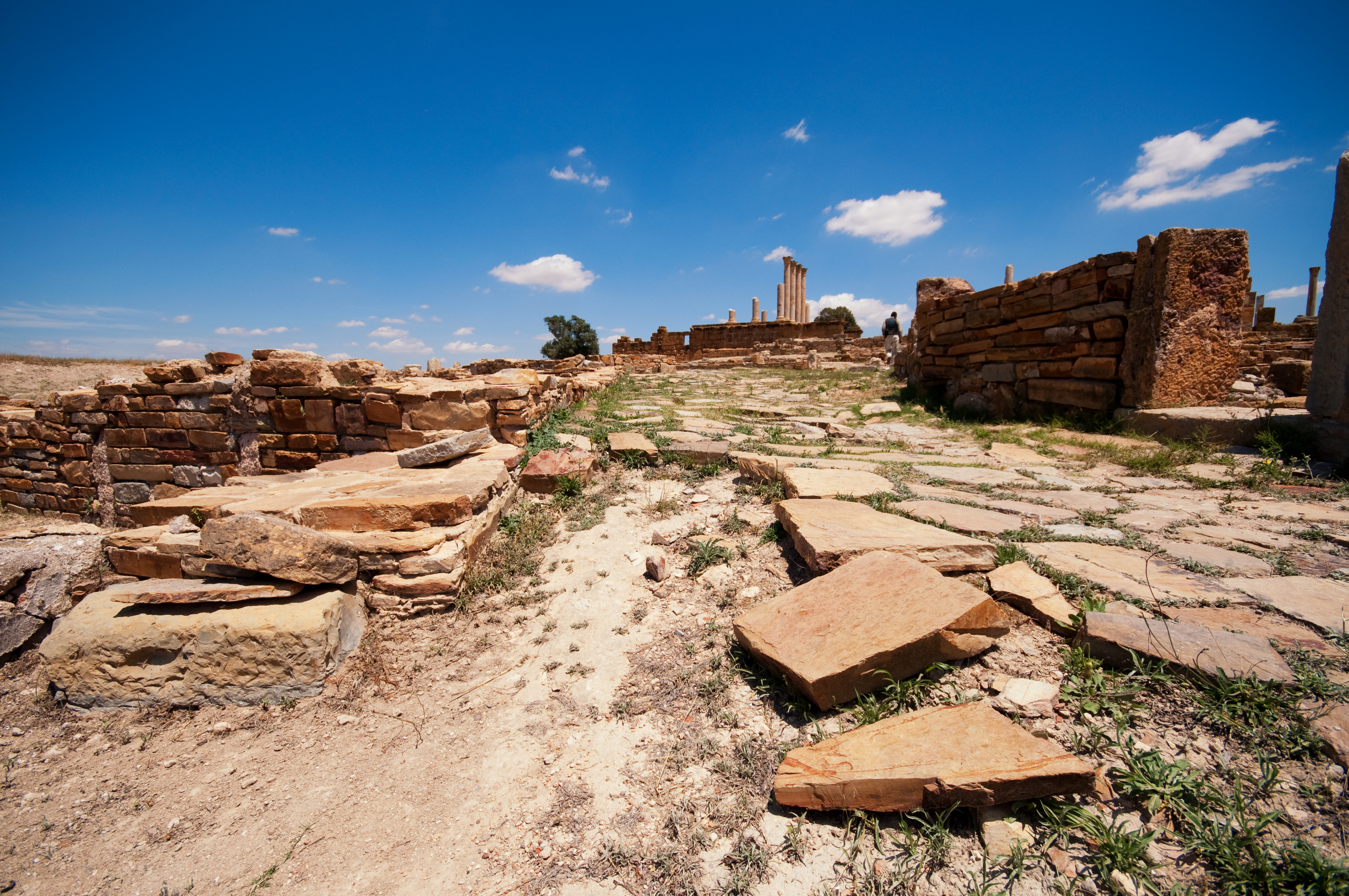
Ruins of the Capital at Tuburium, where the virgins' trial was held

The three young women were martyred under Emperor Valerian's persecution in the 3rd century. It is also possible they were executed under Diocletian given the dates Proconsul Anullinus was procurator.

They are among the few named victims of this widespread persecution, and the primary source on them is John Foxe who records that they "had gall and vinegar given them to drink, were then severely scourged, tormented on a gibbet, rubbed with lime, scorched on a gridiron, worried by wild beasts, and at length beheaded".

== Vitae ==
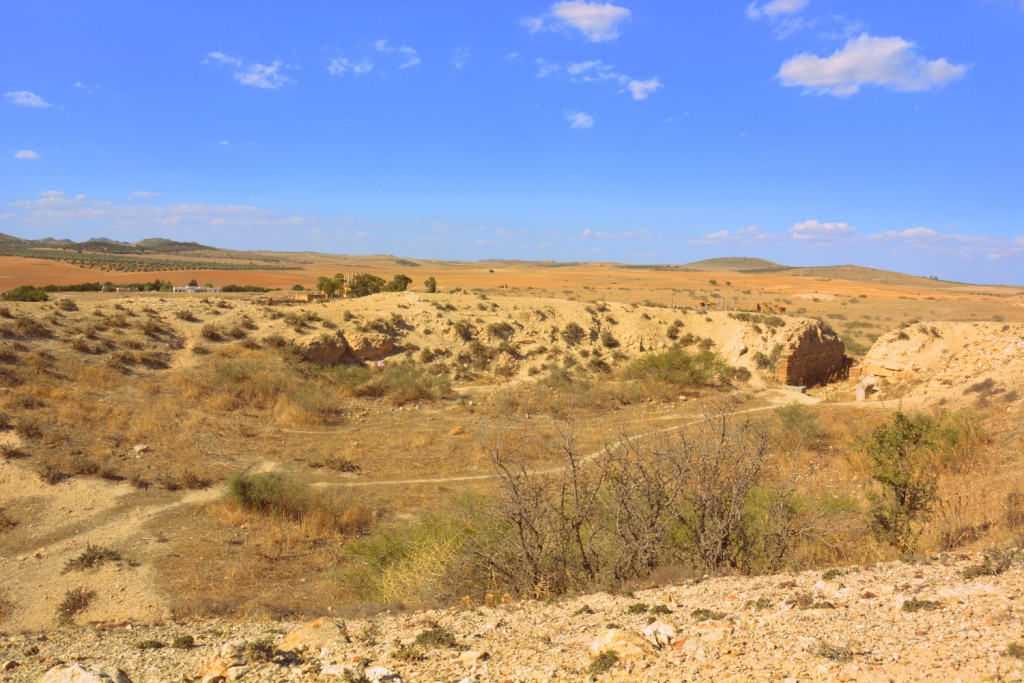
Ruins of the Thuburbo Maius Amphitheatre

Maxima, aged 14, and Donatilla were residents of Tuburga, a Roman colony in Africa Proconsularis, six miles southwest of Carthage. When an edict was issued for the townsfolk to sacrifice to the Roman gods the girls refused, after which they were tried and sentenced by Proconsul Anullinus. At some stage during their imprisonment, the pair met Secunda, aged 12. It is assumed that she was arrested separately since she is not mentioned in the proconsular interview.

Tradition holds that despite the older two girls trying to convince Secunda to recant – as she was much younger and the only child of an aged father – she refused. According to their vitae, the girls were subsequently tortured, and exposed to wild animals which failed to attack them. The order was eventually given to behead them.

== Legacy ==
The girls are considered saints in both Eastern and Western Christianity, with a feast day celebrated on 30 July. They are sometimes mistaken for Perpetua and Felicitas, who were from another town, Thuburbo Majus.

The Emperor Valerian was later captured in battle by the Parthians and reputedly flayed, causing belief among some in the Church in North Africa to claim it was divine retribution for his actions against the martyrs.
