= Nummius Tuscus =

Roman senator

Nummius Tuscus (fl. late 3rd to early 4th century) was a Roman senator who was appointed consul in AD 295.

== Biography ==
A member of the Gens Nummii, Nummius Tuscus was probably the son of Marcus Nummius Tuscus, the consul of 258. He himself was appointed consul prior alongside Gaius Annius Anullinus in 295. Sometime between 295 and 302, Nummius Tuscus served as the proconsular curator of Aquarum et Miniciae; this was followed by his appointment as Praefectus Urbi of Rome, a position he held from 19 February 302 until 12 September 303.

Sometime during the reign of the emperor Maxentius (AD 306–312), Nummius Tuscus and 12 other senators each contributed 400,000 sesterces, probably for the construction of a building in Rome.

== Sources ==
- Chastagnol, André, Les Fastes de la Prefecture de Rome au Bas-Empire (1962)
- Martindale, John R.; Jones, A. H. M.; Morris, John, eds. (1971). The Prosopography of the Later Roman Empire: Volume I, AD 260–395. Cambridge: Cambridge University Press. ISBN 0-521-07233-6.

Political offices
Preceded by Flavius Valerius Constantius, and Gaius Galerius Valerius Maximianus	Consul of the Roman Empire; 295 with Gaius Annius Anullinus	Succeeded by Gaius Aurelius Valerius Diocletianus VI, and Flavius Valerius Constantius II
