= Attius Insteius Tertullus =

Roman senator

Attius Insteius Tertullus (flourished between 280 and 308) was a Roman urban prefect.

He was a descendant of Lucius Insteius Tertullus, who was sodalis Augustalis (i.e., priest of the deified Augustus) in 214. Having risen to become a senator, Tertullus served as consul suffect before his appointments as proconsul of Africa and praefectus urbi in 307–308. He was honoured by an inscription from Patavium, and was probably the father of Attius Insteius Tertullus Populonius, imperial governor of Apulia and Calabria.

== Sources ==
- Martindale, John R.; Jones, A. H. M.; Morris, John, eds. (1971). "Attius Insteius Tertullus 6". The Prosopography of the Later Roman Empire: Volume I, AD 260–395. Cambridge: Cambridge University Press. pp. 883–884. ISBN 0-521-07233-6.

Political offices
| Preceded by Gaius Annius Anullinus | Praefectus urbi of Rome; 307–308 | Succeeded by Statius Rufinus |
