= Argenteus =

Roman Tetrarchic silver coin

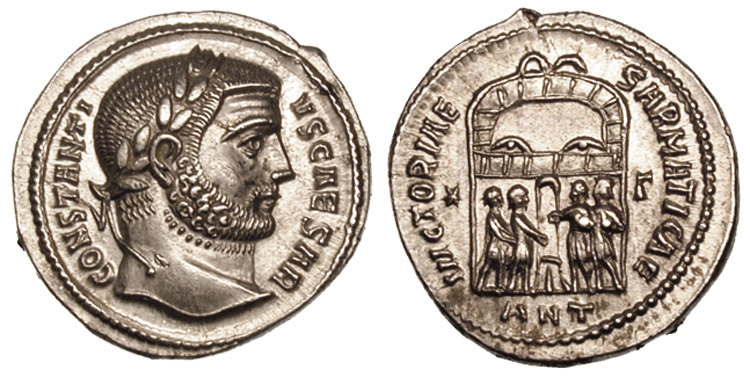
Argenteus struck under Constantius Chlorus, weighing 3.36 g.

The argenteus (pl. argentei, 'of silver') was a silver coin produced by the Roman Empire from the time of Diocletian's coinage reform in AD 294 to ca. AD 310. It was of similar weight and fineness to the denarius of the time of Nero. The coin was produced at a theoretical weight of 1/96th of a Roman pound (about 3 grams), as indicated by the Roman numeral XCVI on the coin's reverse.

One aureus equaled 25 argentei and one argenteus equaled 8 folles.

The term argenteus, meaning "of silver" in Latin, was first used in Pliny's Natural History in the phrase argenteus nummus (silver coin). The 4th-century historian Ammianus uses the same phrase, though there is no indication that this is the official name for a denomination. The Historia Augusta uses the phrase to refer to several fictitious coins.

== See also ==
- Edict on Maximum Prices
- Roman currency
- Solidus (coin)
