= Titus Flavius Postumius Titianus =

Roman senator and consul suffectus c. 291

Titus Flavius Claudius Sulpicianus
- Consul suffectus of the Roman Empire
- Reign: ca. 291

Titus Flavius Postumius Titianus (fl. late 3rd and 4th century AD) was a Roman politician who served as senator and consul suffectus.

== Biography ==
Postumius Titianus was a member of the third century gens Postumia, which was not descended from the Republican family of the same name. In his early career he was an imperial candidate for both the offices of quaestor and praetor. Before the year 291, he was either a suffect consul or perhaps adlectus inter consulares.

Around 291/292, Postumius Titianus was appointed corrector Transpadanae cognoscens vice sacra and electus ad iudicandas sacras appellationes (that is, the Corrector of Cisalpine Gaul and the officer responsible for the management of imperial judicial duties and the execution of the emperor's will). During this time he built and dedicated a temple to Sol Invictus at Comum.

In 292/293, he was the Corrector Campaniae, and was the first official who served in this capacity. This was followed in 293/294 or 294/295 by his posting as consularis aquarum et Miniciae (or the official with proconsular imperium responsible for maintaining the aqueducts and grain importation into Rome). He employed a Titus Aelius Poemenius as his assistant, who set up an inscription to Postumius Titianus when he completed his posting.

From July 295 to July 296, he was the proconsular governor of Africa Proconsularis, replacing Cassius Dio. Then in 301, he was appointed consul prior alongside Virius Nepotianus. Finally, he was appointed Praefectus urbi of Rome, a position he held from 12 February 305 to 19 March 306.

Before 295 he had been appointed to two priestly positions, that of Augur and Pontifex dei Solis. Later on in his career, Postumius Titianus was given another religious role, that of duodecemvir urbis Romae (a college created in connection with the temple of Venus and Roma dedicated by Hadrian in AD 135). He continued to serve his priestly functions into the reign of Constantine I. At some point, he was also the Curator of Lyons, Cales and another unspecified town. Postumius Titianus was also described as an orator.

Postumius Titianus was the last person who styled himself Cos. II on achieving an ordinary consulship on the basis of a previous suffect consulship.

== Notes ==
Political offices
Preceded by Uncertain	Consul suffectus of the Roman Empire before AD 291	Succeeded by Uncertain
Preceded by Flavius Valerius Constantinus Caesar III; Gaius Galerius Valerius Maximianus Caesar III	Consul of the Roman Empire; 301 with Virius Nepotianus	Succeeded by Flavius Valerius Constantinus Caesar IV; Gaius Galerius Valerius Maximianus Caesar IV
