= Severus II =

Roman emperor from 306 to 307

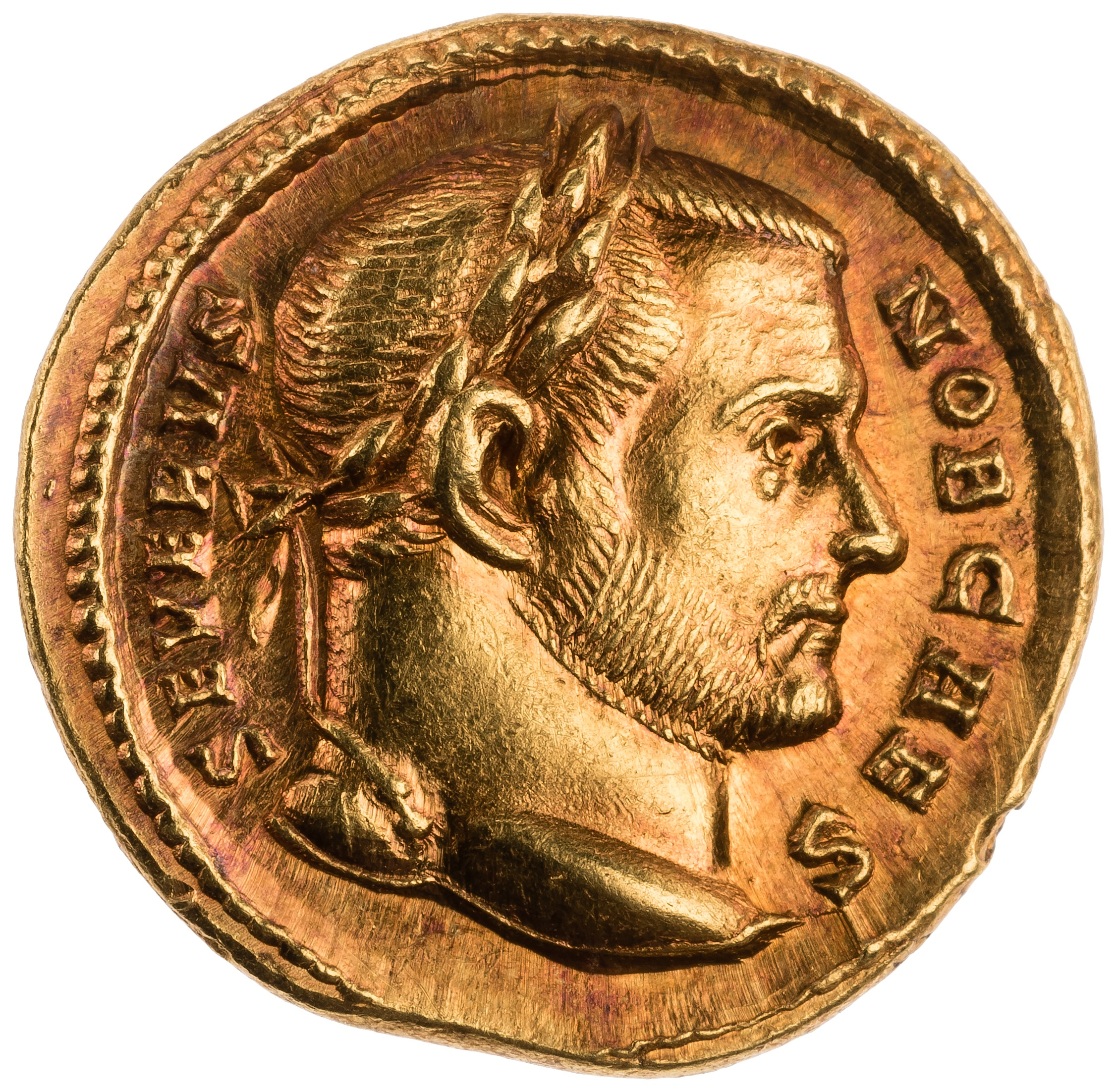
- Aureus of Severus as caesar, Trier mint

Roman emperor
- Augustus: 25 July 306 – April 307 (with Galerius in the East)
- Predecessor: Constantius I
- Successor: Maxentius (de facto); Licinius (de jure)
- Co-ruler: Constantine I
- Caesar: 1 May 305 – 25 July 306 (under Constantius I)
- Born: Severus; Illyria
- Died: September 307; Tres Tabernae, Roman Italy
- Issue: Flavius Severianus
Names
- Flavius Valerius Severus

Flavius Valerius Severus (died September 307), also called Severus II, was a Roman emperor from 306 to 307, and a member of the Tetrarchy. He shared control of the western half of the empire with Constantine I, but spent most of his short reign in a civil war against the usurper Maxentius, who later killed him and took over Italy.

== Background and early career ==
Severus was of humble birth, born in Northern Illyria around the middle of the third century. A friend of emperor Galerius, he rose to become a senior officer in the Roman army, being nominated as caesar (junior ruler's title in the Tetrarchy) of the western half of the empire. According to Lactantius, Diocletian objected to Galerius's suggestion, saying in response, "What! That dancer, that habitual drunkard who turns night into day and day into night?" Galerius persisted, saying that Severus had served faithfully as paymaster and purveyor of the army. Diocletian acquiesced and Severus succeeded to the post of caesar on 1 May 305, thus becoming the junior colleague of Constantius I, augustus (senior ruler's title) of the western half of empire.

== Augustus, 306–307 ==
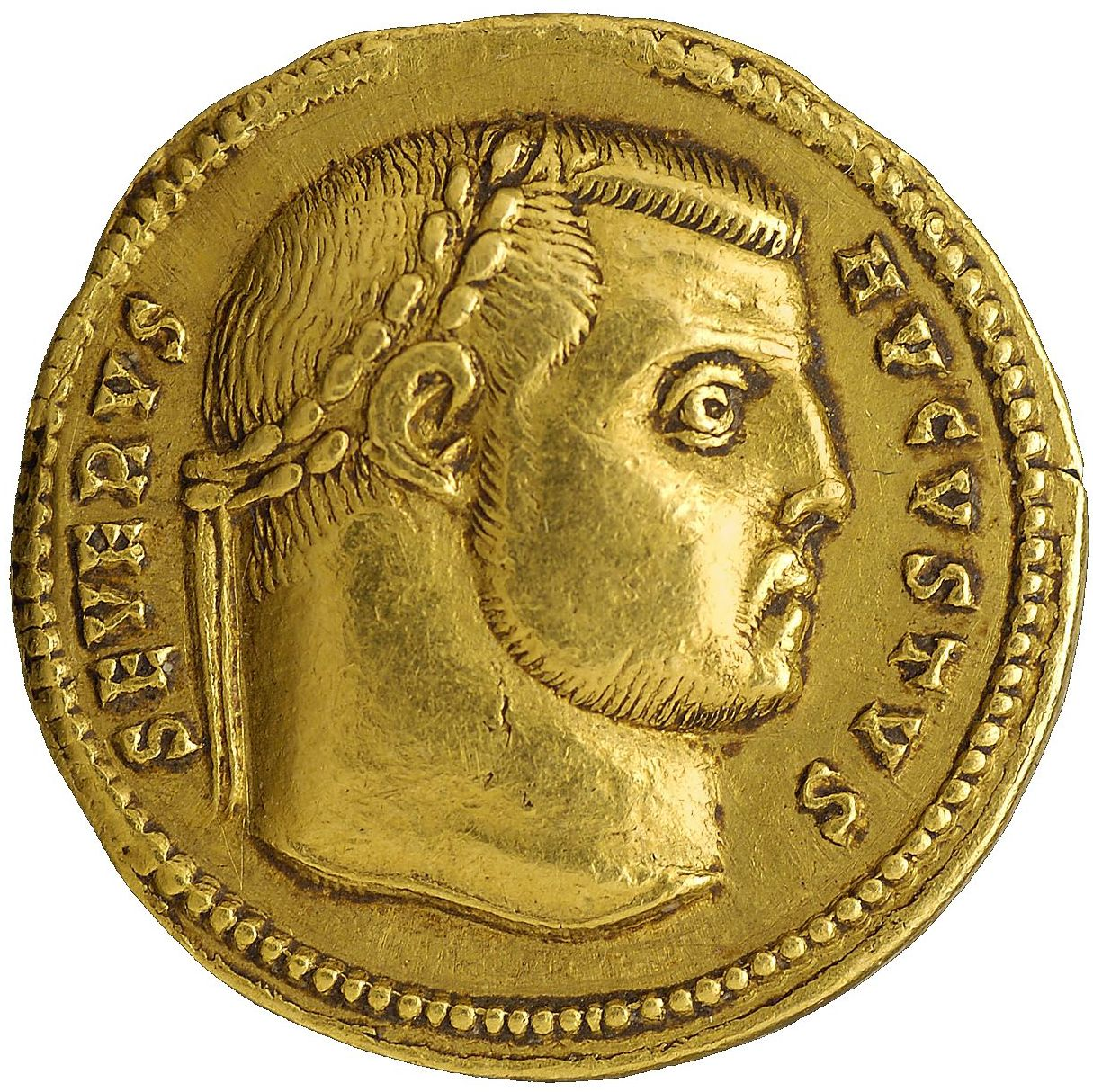
Aureus from 306 or 307 depicting Severus, Nicomedia mint

When Constantius died in Britain in July 306, his soldiers immediately acclaimed his son Constantine I as augustus. However at the same time, Severus was also promoted to augustus by Galerius. Lactantius reports that Galerius had done this to promote the older man to the higher office, while accepting the imperial symbols of Constantine and accepting him as a member of the Tetrarchy, albeit with the rank of caesar. Despite his lower title, Constantine controlled most of the Western empire (Britain, Gaul, and Hispania), leaving Severus with the control of Italy and Africa.

When Maxentius, the son of the retired emperor Maximian, revolted at Rome in October, Galerius sent Severus to suppress the rebellion. Severus moved towards Rome from his capital, Mediolanum, at the head of an army previously commanded by Maximian. Fearing the arrival of Severus, Maxentius offered Maximian the co-rule of the empire. Maximian accepted, and when Severus arrived under the walls of Rome and besieged it, his men deserted to Maxentius. Severus fled to Ravenna, an impregnable position. Maximian offered to spare his life and treat him humanely if he surrendered peaceably, which he did around April 307. Despite Maximian's assurance, Severus was nonetheless displayed as a captive and later imprisoned at Tres Tabernae, near the current Cisterna di Latina. One belief is that when Galerius himself invaded Italy to suppress Maxentius and Maximian, the former ordered Severus's death. His death probably took place in September or October, as documents with his name were still issued in September, while news of his death already arrived in Egypt by December. Lactantius reports that he was permitted to kill himself by opening his veins. Another belief is that Severus was killed in Ravenna.

The position of Western augustus remained officially vacant until the Conference of Carnuntum of November 308, in which Licinius was appointed as new emperor (although his western domains only consisted of the Balkan Peninsula). Severus was survived by his son Flavius Severianus, but he was later executed by Licinius for treason.

== Sources ==
- Barnes, Timothy D. (1981). Constantine and Eusebius. Cambridge, MA: Harvard University Press. ISBN 978-0-674-16531-1.

Regnal titles
Preceded by Constantius I	Roman emperor 306–307; With: Galerius	Succeeded by Licinius
Political offices
Preceded by Constantius I Galerius	Roman consul 307; With: Maximinus Daza; Galerius; Maximian; Constantine I	Succeeded by Diocletian; Galerius; Maxentius; Valerius Romulus
