= Galerius =

Roman emperor from 305 to 311

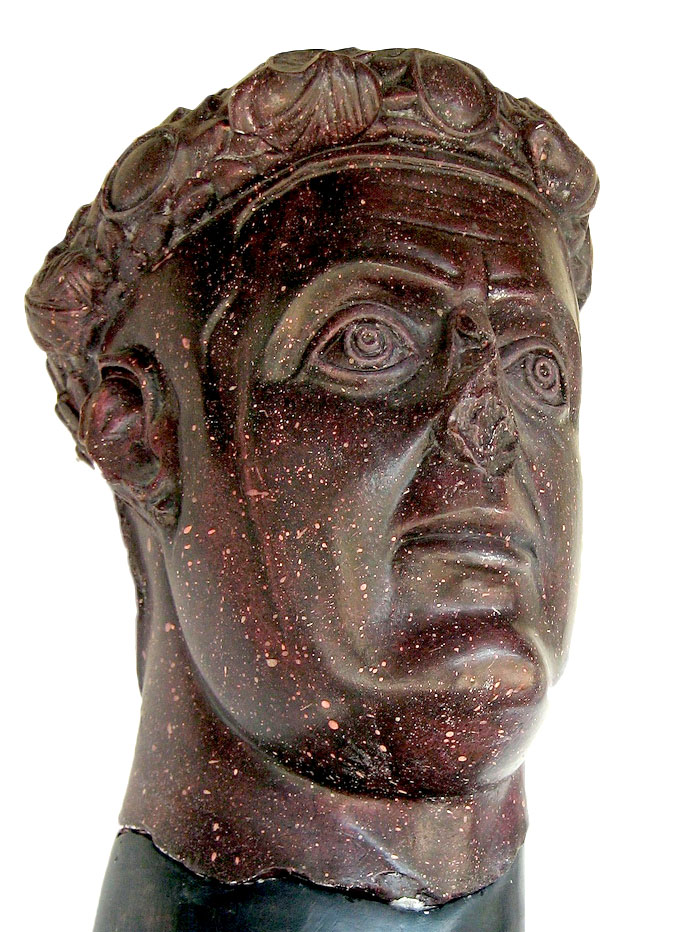
- Likely bust of Galerius in porphyry, found in 1993 at Gamzigrad and held at the National Museum in Zaječar, Serbia.

Roman emperor
- Augustus: 1 May 305 – early May 311
- Predecessor: Diocletian and Maximian
- Successor: Maximinus II and Licinius (both in the East)
- Co-rulers: See list: Constantius I (305–306) (Note: In the West; proclaimed by Maximian.); Severus II (306–307) (Note: In the West; proclaimed by Galerius.); Constantine I (306–311) (Note: In the West; not recognized by the other tetrarchs.); Maxentius (306–311) (Note: In Italy; not recognized by the other tetrarchs.); Maximian (306–310) (Note: In Italy; not recognized by the other tetrarchs. He was defeated in 308, but rebelled again in 310.); Licinius (308–311) (Note: In the Middle realms; proclaimed by Galerius. Emperor of the East following Maximinus' death.); Alexander (308–311) (Note: Usurper in Africa, unrecognized elsewhere.); Maximinus II (310–311) (Note: In the East; proclaimed by his troops.)
- Caesar: 1 March 293 (Note: The earlier dates for Galerius's appointment have been argued for based on the suggestion that the appointments of Constantius and Galerius were timed to coincide (Barnes 1981, 8–9; Southern 1999, 146). Barnes (1982, 62) argues against a dating of 21 May 293 in Nicomedia originating in Seston, Dioclétien, 88ff., stating that the evidence adduced (the 7th-century Paschal Chronicle Ol.268 and the contemporary Lactantius, DMP 19.2) is invalid and confused. Lactantius is commenting on Diocletian and the place where Diocletian was acclaimed, and that the "Maximianus" in the text is therefore a later gloss; the Paschal Chronicle is not authoritative for this period for events outside Egypt, and may simply be commenting on the day when the laureled image of the new emperors arrived in Alexandria. Moreover, Lactantius (DMP 35) explicitly states that Galerius's dies imperii fell on 1 March. Potter (2004, 650) agrees that locating the acclamation to Nicomedia is false, but believes that Seston's other evidence makes a strong case for a temporal lag between the two Caesars' acclamations.) – 1 May 305 (under Diocletian)
- Born: Galerius Maximinus c. 258; Serdica or Gamzigrad, Roman Empire
- Died: early May 311 (aged c. 53); Serdica, Dacia Ripensis, Roman Empire
- Burial: Felix Romuliana
- Spouse: Galeria Valeria
- Issue: Valeria Maximilla; Candidianus
Names
- Gaius Galerius Valerius Maximianus
Regnal name
- Imperator Caesar Gaius Galerius Valerius Maximianus Augustus
- Father: Diocletian (adoptive)
- Mother: Romula
- Religion: Roman polytheism

Gaius Galerius Valerius Maximianus (Note: Sometimes called "Maximian II" , since ancient sources often call him "Galerius Maximianus".) (/ɡəˈlɛəriəs/; Latin: Galerius; c. 258 – May 311) was Roman emperor from 305 to 311. He participated in the system of government later known as the Tetrarchy, first acting as caesar under Emperor Diocletian. In this period Galerius obtained victory warring against the Persian Sasanian Empire, defeating Narseh at the battle of Satala in 298 and possibly sacking the Sasanian capital of Ctesiphon in 299. He also campaigned across the Danube against the Carpi, defeating them in 297 and 300. Galerius was promoted to augustus upon the abdication of Diocletian in 305, but had to contend with multiple usurpers as the Tetrarchic system broke down. Although he was a staunch opponent of Christianity, he ended the Diocletianic Persecution by issuing the Edict of Serdica in 311.

== Early life ==
Galerius was a Roman Emperor of Dacian origin born in the Danube provinces, either near Serdica or at the place where he later built his palace named after his mother – Felix Romuliana (Gamzigrad), in the province later known as Dacia Ripensis. Under this palace, an older villa has been found that is sometimes interpreted as Galerius's birthplace. His mother, Romula, had left Roman Dacia (today Romania) and settled in New Dacia south of the Danube because of the Carpians' attacks. He originally followed his father's occupation, that of a herdsman, where he was nicknamed "Armentarius", herdsman (Latin: armentum, lit. 'herd'). His original cognomen was "Maximinus", but he changed it to "Maximianus" after becoming Caesar.

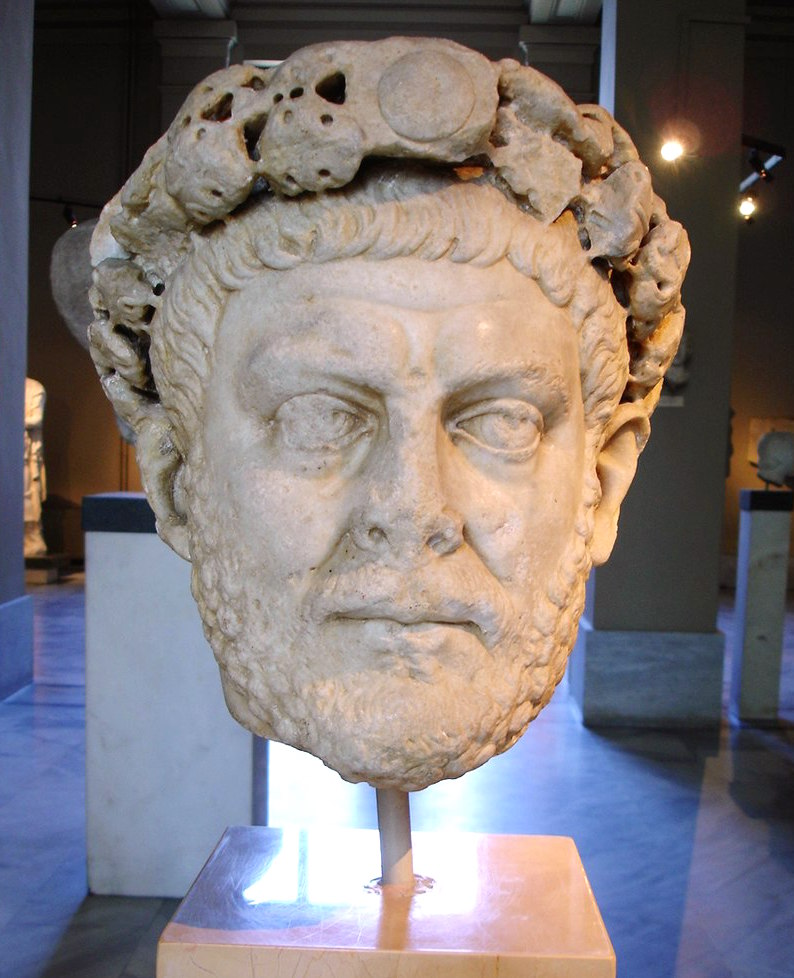
Diocletian, Galerius's father-in-law and senior emperor

He served with distinction as a soldier under Emperors Aurelian and Probus. Galerius is stated to have divorced an earlier wife upon marrying Diocletian's daughter Valeria (later known as Galeria Valeria), just as Constantius Chlorus is said to have divorced Helena to marry Maximian's daughter Theodora. This claim is stated by writers Aurelius Victor, Jerome, and Eutropius, as well as in the anonymous Epitome de Caesaribus, and the Historia Augusta and probably derives from a common, now lost, source. The factuality of this claim is disputed by some historians, who believe it might derive from attempts by Constantine to establish that his mother Helena was married to his father, and not just a concubine. The date of the marriages of Galerius and Chlorus to the emperors daughters are also disputed, with several ancient sources claiming that the marriages both took place in 293, but modern historians such as Julia Hillner and Máirín MacCarron have noted that there exists panegyrics from as early as 289 which seem to imply that Chlorus had already become a kinsman of Maximian. Hillner and MacCarron argue therefore that the two men had become son-in-laws of the emperors before they were elevated to the rank of Caesar in 293.

In 293, at the establishment of the Tetrarchy, Galerius was designated Caesar along with Constantius Chlorus, and was entrusted with the care of the Illyrian provinces. After a few years campaigning against Sarmatians and Goths on the Danube, he received command of the legions on the eastern imperial limits. Soon after his appointment, Galerius was dispatched to Egypt to fight the rebellious cities Busiris and Coptos.

== War with Persia ==
=== Invasion, counterinvasion ===
In 294, Narseh, a son of Shapur I, who had been passed over for the Sasanid succession, came into power in Persia. Narseh probably moved to eliminate Bahram III, a young man installed by a noble named Vahunam in the wake of Bahram II's death in 293. In early 294, Narseh sent Diocletian the customary package of gifts, but within Persia, he was destroying every trace of his immediate predecessors, erasing their names from public monuments. He sought to identify himself with the warlike reigns of Ardashir (r. 226–241) and Shapur (r. 241–272), who had sacked Roman Antioch and captured Emperor Valerian.

In 295 or 296, Narseh declared war on Rome. He appears to have first invaded western Armenia, retaking the lands delivered to Tiridates in the peace of 287. He occupied the lands there until the following year. The historian Ammianus Marcellinus, circa 320–395, is the only source detailing the initial invasion of Armenia. Southern (1999, 149) dates the invasion to 295; Barnes (1982, 17, 293) mentions an earlier, unsuccessful invasion by Narseh based on the fact that the title Persici Maximi was given to all four emperors; Odahl (2004, 59) concurs with Barnes and suggests that Saracen princes in the Syrian desert collaborated with Narseh's invasion. Narseh then moved south into Roman Mesopotamia, where he inflicted a severe defeat on Galerius, then commander of the eastern forces, in the region between Carrhae (Harran, Turkey) and Callinicum (Raqqa, Syria). Diocletian may or may not have been present at the battle, but presented himself soon afterwards at Antioch, issuing an official version of events which placed all the blame for the affair upon Galerius. In Antioch, Diocletian forced Galerius to walk a mile in advance of his imperial cart while still clad in the purple robes of an emperor. David Stone Potter reads a symbolic message in the display: the loss at Carrhae was due not to the failings of the empire's soldiers, but to the failings of their commander, and Galerius's failures would not be accepted. Another scholar, Roger Rees, suggests that Galerius's position at the head of the caravan was merely the conventional organization of an imperial progression, designed to show a Caesar's deference to his Augustus.

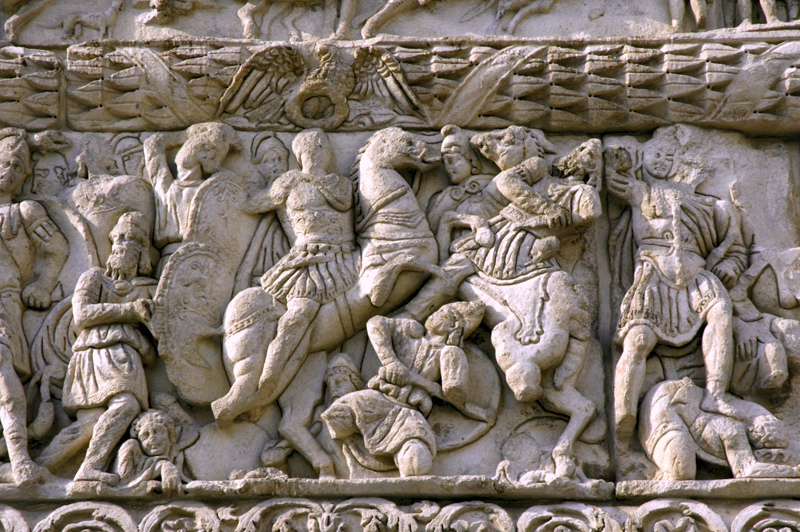
Detail of Galerius attacking Narseh on the Arch of Galerius at Thessaloniki, Greece, the city where Galerius carried out most of his administrative actions.

Galerius's army was reinforced probably in the spring of 298 by new contingents collected from the empire's Danubian holdings. Narseh did not advance from Armenia and Mesopotamia leaving Galerius to lead the offensive in 298 with an attack on northern Mesopotamia via Armenia. Diocletian may or may not have been present to assist the campaign. Narseh retreated to Armenia to fight Galerius's force, putting himself at a disadvantage; the rugged Armenian terrain was favorable to Roman infantry, but not to Sasanid cavalry. Local aid gave Galerius the advantage of surprise over the Persian forces, and he defeated Narseh in two successive battles. During the second encounter, the Battle of Satala in 298, Roman forces seized Narseh's camp, his treasury, his harem, and his wife. Narseh's wife would live out the remainder of the war in Daphne, a suburb of Antioch, serving as a constant reminder to the Persians of the Roman victory.

Galerius advanced into Media and Adiabene, winning continuous victories, most prominently near Theodosiopolis (Erzurum), and securing Nisibis (Nusaybin) before 1 October 298. The historian Timothy Barnes argues that he moved down the Tigris, taking Ctesiphon. Barnes's main argument for this is that Eusebius's biography of Constantine mentions that the later emperor had seen the ruins of Babylon according to this work. Patricia Southern also argues that he took Ctesiphon based on the uncertainty of the location where the seizure of Narseh's wife and harem took place. However, no source ever specifically claims that Ctesiphon was sacked and many other historians argue Diocletian prevented him from moving further into Sasanian territory.

=== Peace negotiations ===
Narseh had previously sent an ambassador to Galerius to plead for the return of his wife and children, but Galerius had dismissed this ambassador, reminding him of how Shapur had treated Valerian. In any case, the Romans treated Narseh's captured family well, perhaps seeking to evoke comparisons to Alexander and his beneficent conduct towards the family of Darius III. Peace negotiations began in the spring of 299, with both Diocletian and Galerius presiding. Their magister memoriae (secretary) Sicorius Probus was sent to Narseh to present terms.

The conditions of the Peace of Nisibis were heavy: Persia would give up territory to Rome, making the Tigris the boundary between the two empires. Further terms specified that Armenia was returned to Roman domination with the fort of Ziatha as its border; Caucasian Iberia would pay allegiance to Rome under a Roman appointee; Nisibis, now under Roman rule, would become the sole conduit for trade between Persia and Rome; and Rome would exercise control over the five satrapies between the Tigris and Armenia: Ingilene, Sophanene (Sophene), Arzanene (Aghdznik), Corduene, and Zabdicene (near modern Hakkâri, Turkey). These regions included the passage of the Tigris through the Anti-Taurus range; the Bitlis pass, the quickest southerly route into Persian Armenia; and access to the Tur Abdin plateau. With these territories, Rome would have an advance station north of Ctesiphon, and would be able to slow any future advance of Persian forces through the region. Under the terms of the peace, Tiridates would regain both his throne and the entirety of his ancestral claim, and Rome would secure a wide zone of cultural influence in the region. Because the empire was able to sustain such constant warfare on so many fronts, it has been taken as a sign of the essential efficacy of the Diocletianic system and the goodwill of the army towards the tetrarchic enterprise.

== Rule as Augustus ==
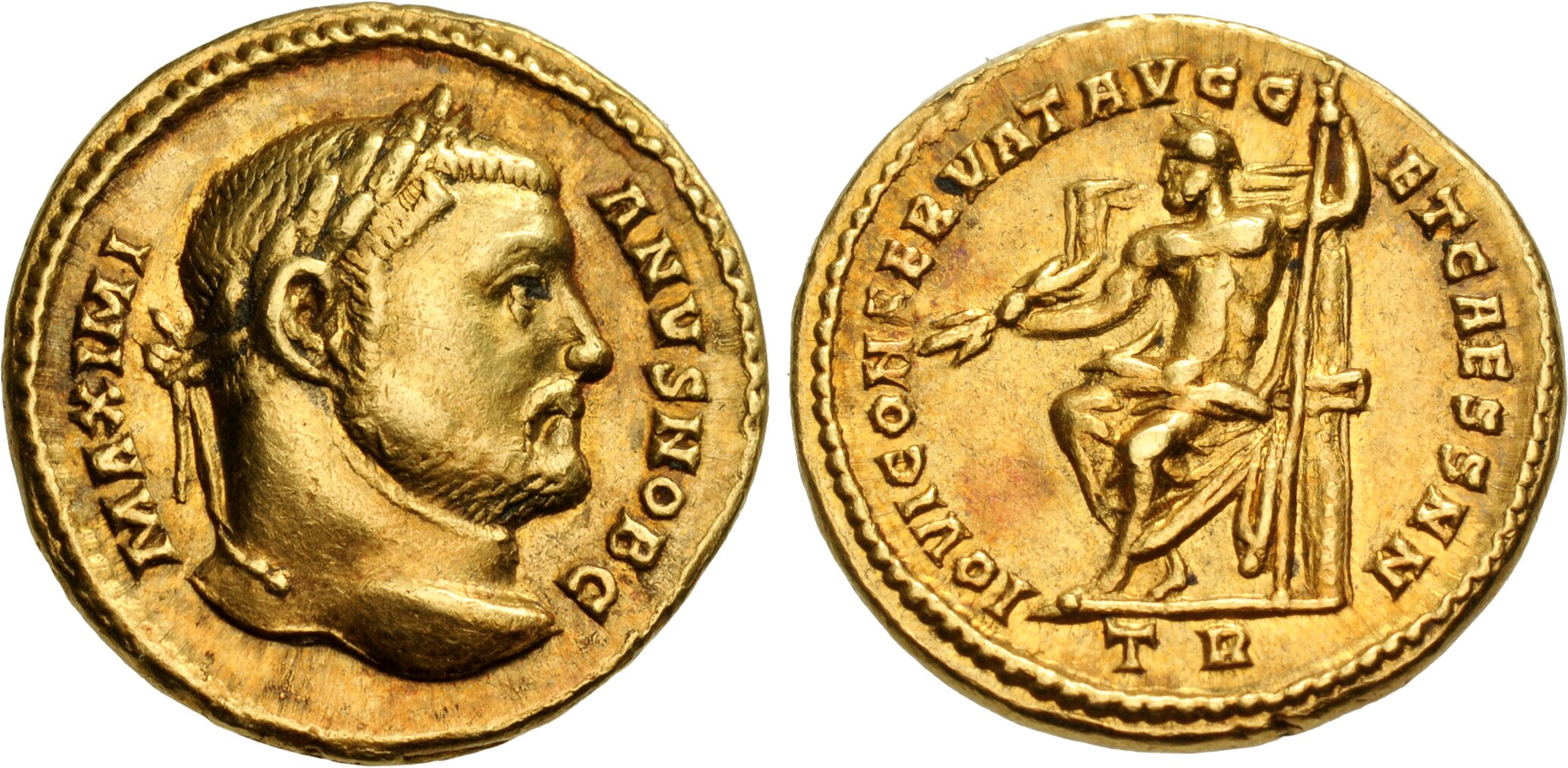
Aureus of Galerius as Caesar. The reverse depicts the god Jupiter. (Note: Emperor Maximian apparently never issued any coinage when he was Caesar, so coins with the name "Maximianus Caesar" must represent Galerius. The only source that refers to Maximian as having been Caesar is Eutropius.)

After the abdication of Diocletian in 305 and the elevation of Constantius I and Galerius to the rank of Augustus, two new Caesars were required to take their place. Seeking to enhance his authority, Galerius gave the positions to men who were very much his creatures. Maximinus Daza, a nephew of Galerius with little experience or formal education, was assigned the command of Egypt and Syria. Valerius Severus, Galerius's comrade in arms, was sent to govern Italy and Africa from a base in Mediolanum. Officially Severus reported to the western emperor, but he was absolutely devoted to the commands of his benefactor Galerius, whose power was thus established over three-quarters of the empire.

Constantius died at Eboracum in 306 and the legions elevated his son Constantine to the position of Augustus. Galerius only discovered this when he received a letter from Constantine, who apologized for the informal nature of his promotion but nonetheless treated it as valid. The first emotions of Galerius were surprise, disappointment, and rage, and as he could seldom restrain his passions, he threatened to burn both the letter and the messenger. Calmer consideration made him reluctant to open a civil war: Constantine had the devotion of Constantius' legions, and the young man's character had impressed Galerius during an encounter at Nicomedia. Galerius decided on a compromise position, allowing Constantine to rule the provinces beyond the Alps but giving him only the title of Caesar and the fourth rank among the Tetrarchs. Severus received the title of Augustus.

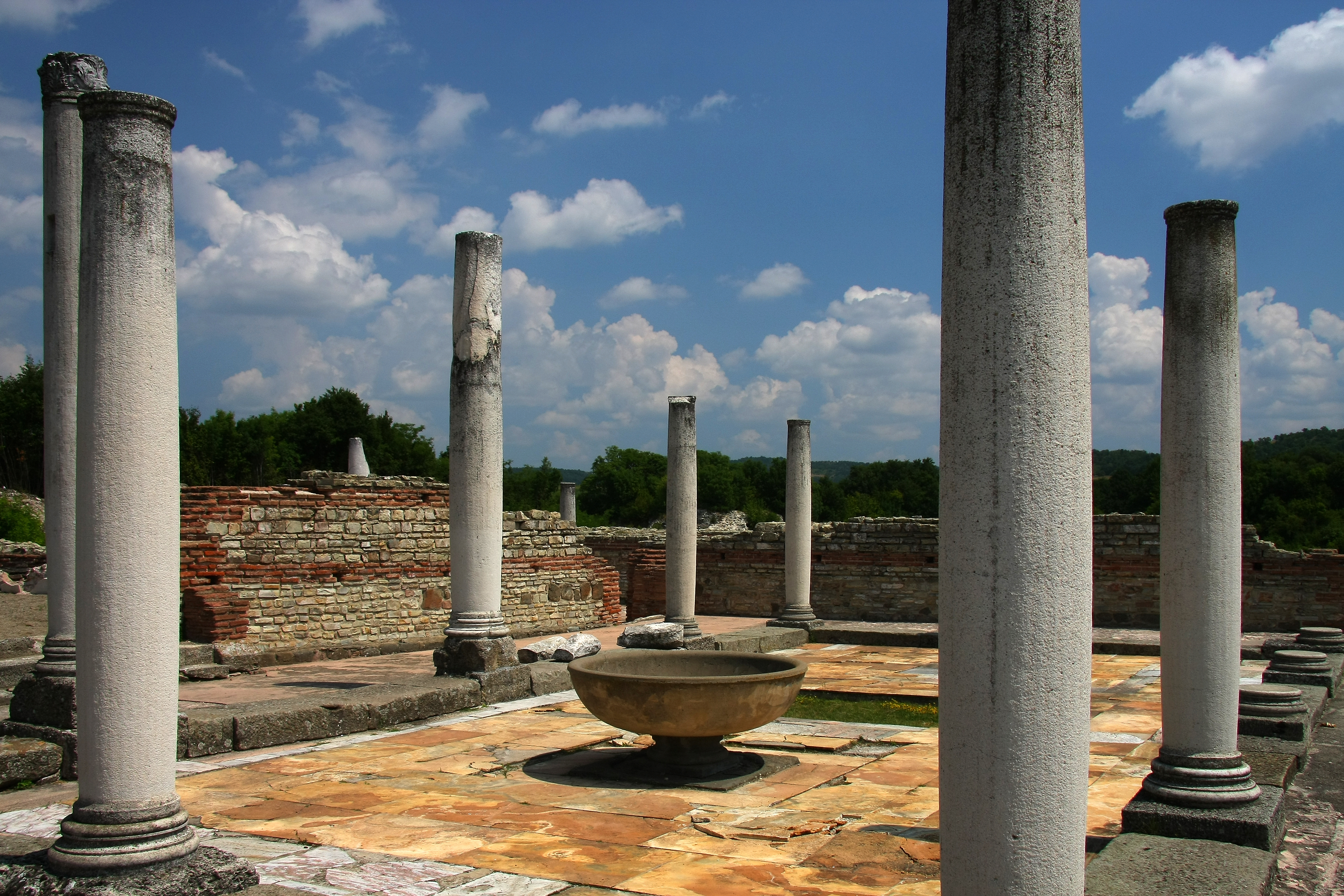
Gamzigrad-Romuliana, Palace of Galerius in Zaječar, Serbia, today a UNESCO World Heritage Site

Soon afterward, Maxentius, son of Maximian and husband of Galerius's daughter Valeria Maximilla, rebelled in Italy. A need for additional revenue had caused Galerius to disregard Italy's traditional exemption from any form of taxation, and Maxentius exploited local indignation to declare himself emperor. An army led by Severus hastened to Rome, hoping to catch the usurper by surprise, but Maximian, who had previously commanded many of the invading troops, came out of retirement in support of his son. The army switched sides, and Severus was arrested and later executed.

Leaving his long-time friend and military companion Licinius to guard the Danube, Galerius personally invaded Italy with a powerful army collected from Illyricum and the East. He forced his way as far as Narni, within sixty miles of Rome, but skillful preparations by Maximian prevented him from capturing any territory along the way.

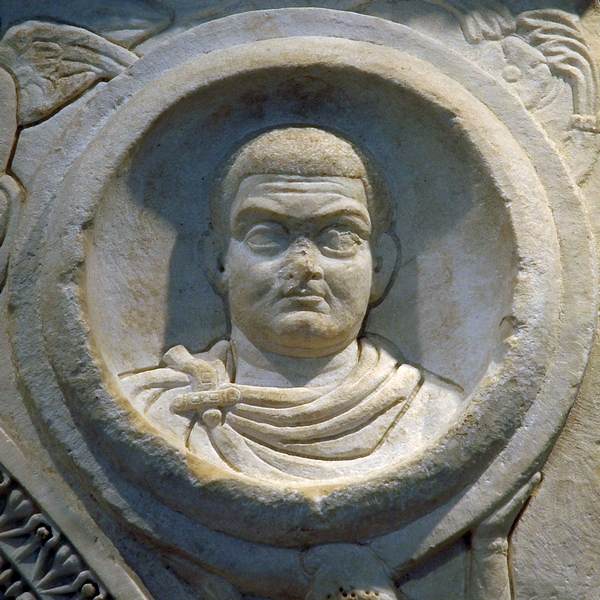
Portrait of Galerius on his small arch

The strength of the enemy's position made Galerius send peace overtures to Rome, professing his fatherly affection for Maxentius and promising to be generous if the rebels cooperated. Maxentius refused the offer, and meanwhile compromised the loyalty of the invasion force by sending bribes to the Illyrian legions. Galerius was compelled to begin a withdrawal from Italy, and it was only with great difficulty that he managed to stop his veterans deserting him. In frustration, Galerius allowed his legions to ravage the countryside as they passed northwards. Maxentius declined to make a general engagement.

With so many emperors now in existence, in 308 Galerius, together with the retired emperor Diocletian and the now active Maximian, called an imperial conference at Carnuntum on the River Danube to rectify the situation and bring some order back into the government. Here it was agreed that Licinius would become Augustus in the West, with Constantine as his Caesar. In the East, Galerius remained Augustus and Maximinus remained his Caesar. Maximian was to retire, and Maxentius was declared a usurper.

Galerius's plan soon failed. Envious of Licinius's promotion, Maximinus also claimed the title of Augustus. Maximian, still not willing to retire, declared himself emperor in Arles in opposition to Constantine, who was campaigning against the Franks. An additional usurper, Domitius Alexander, arose in Africa, bringing the number of claimants of imperial power up to seven. Galerius maintained his seniority and ceased trying to encroach on the other emperors' domains; he spent his later years in recreation and in public works, such as an extensive logging and drainage project at Lake Pelso (modern Lake Balaton).

== Persecution of Christians ==
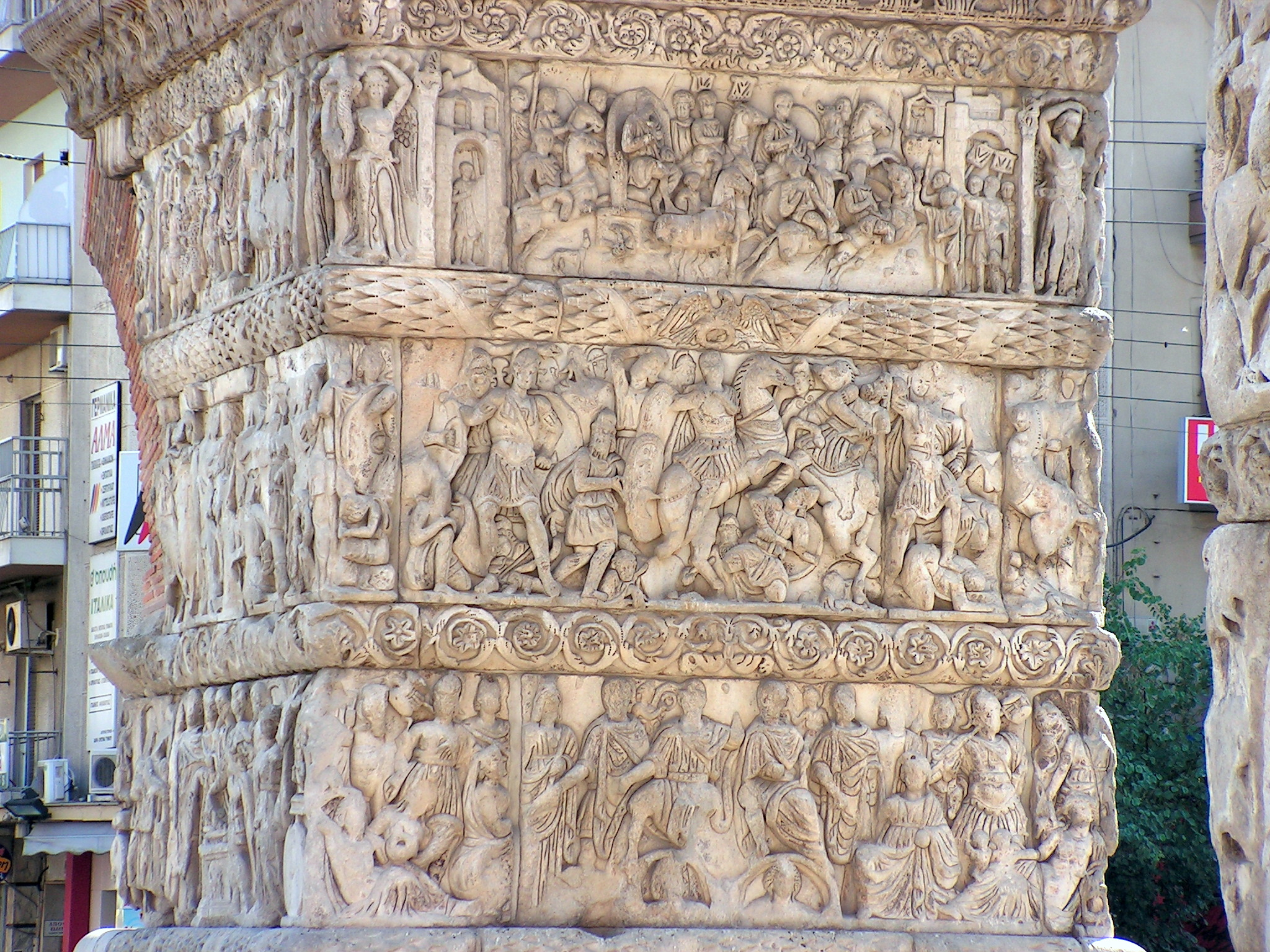
Detail of the Arch of Galerius in Thessaloniki.

Christians had lived pleasantly during most of the rule of Diocletian. The persecutions that began with an edict of 24 February 303, were credited by Christians to Galerius's work, as he was a fierce advocate of the old ways and old gods. Christian houses of assembly were destroyed, for fear of sedition in secret gatherings. Diocletian was not anti-Christian during the first part of his reign, and historians have claimed that Galerius decided to prod him into persecuting them by secretly burning the Imperial Palace and blaming it on Christian saboteurs. Regardless of who was at fault for the fire, Diocletian's rage was aroused and he began one of the last and greatest Christian persecutions in the history of the Roman Empire.

It was at the insistence of Galerius that the last edicts of persecution against the Christians were published, beginning in 303, and this policy of repression was maintained by him until the appearance of the general edict of toleration, issued in Serdica in April 311, apparently during his last bout of illness (see Edict of Toleration by Galerius). Galerius's last request was that Christians should pray for him as he suffered with a painful and fatal illness.

Initially one of the leading figures in the persecutions, Galerius later admitted that the policy of trying to eradicate Christianity had failed, saying: "wherefore, for this our indulgence, they ought to pray to their God for our safety, for that of the republic, and for their own, that the republic may continue uninjured on every side, and that they may be able to live securely in their homes." Lactantius gives the text of the edict in his moralized chronicle of the bad ends to which all the persecutors came, De Mortibus Persecutorum. This marked the end of official persecution of Christianity, which was officially legalized two years later by Constantine and Licinius in the Edict of Milan.

== Death ==
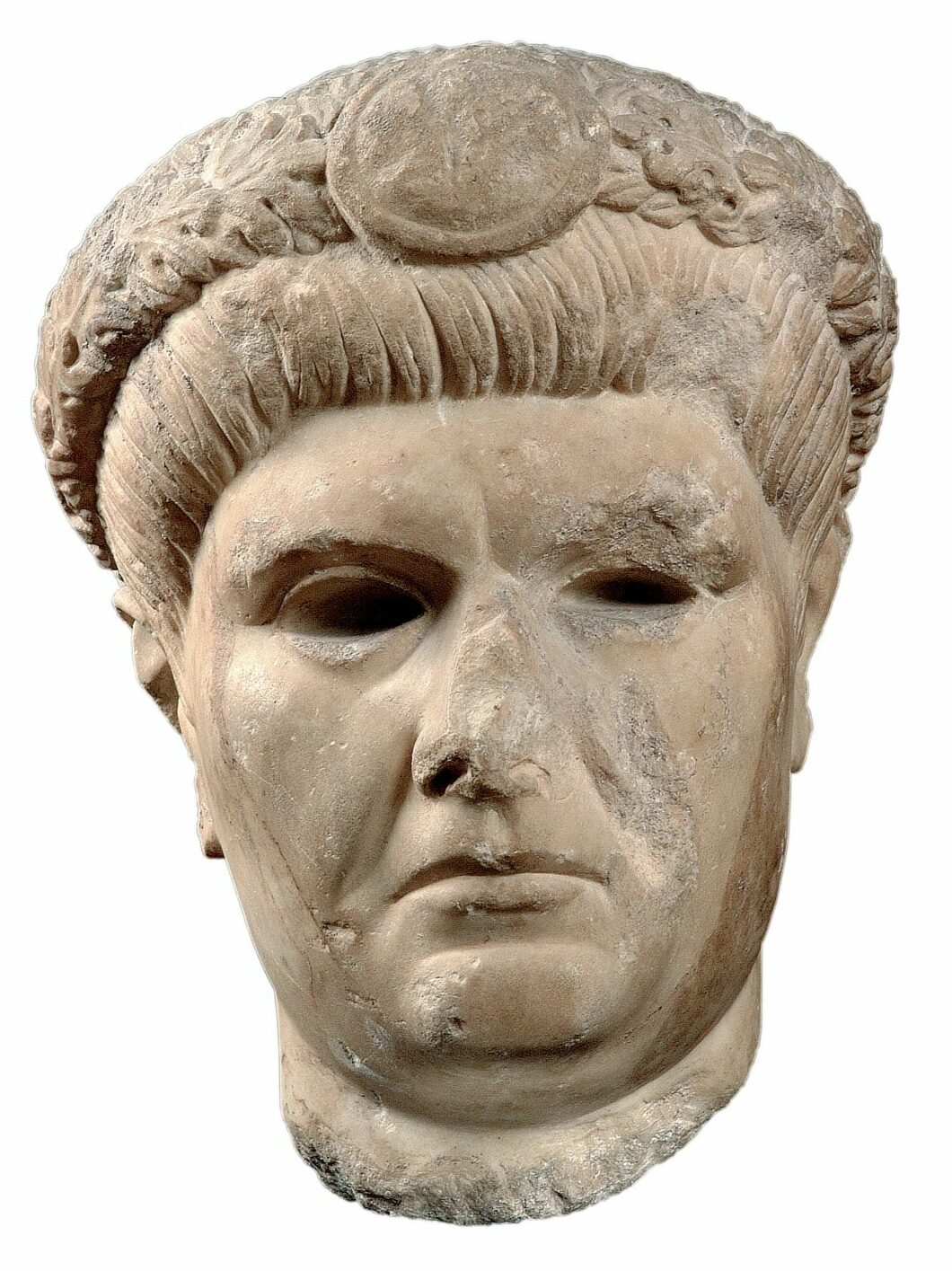
Head in the Canellopoulos Museum – once part of an over life-sized statue, possibly Galerius.

Galerius died in late April or early May 311 from a horribly gruesome disease described by Eusebius and Lactantius, possibly some form of bowel cancer, gangrene or Fournier gangrene.

Galerius was buried in his mausoleum at Gamzigrad-Romuliana, which was part of the palace he built at his birthplace, today's Zaječar in Serbia. Several lumps composed of corroded iron ring mail (lorica hamata) have been found at the site. This mail armour may have been worn by the wax figure of the emperor that was burned during the imperial funeral and apotheosis ceremony. The entire site has been inscribed into the World Heritage List in June 2007.

== Criticisms ==
According to Lactantius, a Christian and adviser to Constantine who wrote De Mortibus Persecutorum, Galerius affirmed his Dacian identity and avowed himself the enemy of the Roman name once made emperor, even proposing that the empire should be called, not the Roman, but the Dacian Empire, much to the horror of the patricians and senators. Lactantius further states that Galerius exhibited anti-Roman attitude as soon as he had attained the highest power, treating the Roman citizens with ruthless cruelty, like the conquerors treated the conquered, all in the name of the same treatment that the victorious Trajan had applied to the conquered Dacians, forefathers of Galerius, two centuries before. However, Lactantius has long been criticized as a biased observer of the events he records, writing polemic rather than history. Timothy Barnes summed up this position saying about De Mortibus Persecutorum: "Lactantius' prejudices and strong opinions foster the suspicion that he must have tailored the facts to suit his thesis."

== Honours ==
Galerius Peak in Antarctica is named after Emperor Galerius.

== Family tree ==
Simplified family tree of Tetrarchs

(See also: Chronological scheme of the Tetrarchy, 286–324)

DIOCLETIAN; Iovius; Eastern Emperor; 286–305	Prisca	Afranius Hannibalianus (disputed) (Note: Timothy Barnes (New Empire, 33–34) questions the parentage of Theodora shown here. He proposes that Maximian is her natural father (and that her mother is possibly a daughter of Afranius Hannibalianus). Substituting Afranicus Hannibalianus and switching the positions of Maximian and Eutropia would produce a diagram that matches the alternative lineage.) consul 292	Eutropia	Maximian; Herculius; Western Emperor; 286–305
Unknown sister	Galerius; Eastern Emperor; 305-311	Galeria Valeria	Helena	Constantius I Western Emperor; 305–306; Constantinian Dynasty	Flavia Maximiana Theodora	Severus II; Western Emperor; 306–307
Maximinus II; Eastern Emperor; 310–313	Valeria Maximilla	Maxentius; Western Emperor; 306–312	Fausta	Constantine I Roman Emperor; 306–337	Julius Constantius consul 335	Flavia Julia Constantia	Licinius I Western then Eastern Emperor; 308–324	Martinian; Eastern Emperor; 324	Valens I Eastern Emperor; 316–317
Valerius Romulus	Constantine II; Western Emperor; 337–340	Constantius II; Emperor; 337–361	Constans I Middle then Western Emperor; 337–350	Julian II; Emperor; 361–363	Licinius II caesar

Notes:

Bibliography:

- Barnes, Timothy D. The New Empire of Diocletian and Constantine. Cambridge, MA: Harvard University Press, 1982. ISBN 0-7837-2221-4

== See also ==
- Arch of Galerius and Rotunda
- Civil wars of the Tetrarchy

== Sources ==
=== Ancient sources ===
- Codex Theodosianus.
  - Mommsen, T. and Paul M. Meyer, eds. Theodosiani libri XVI cum Constitutionibus Sirmondianis et Leges novellae ad Theodosianum pertinentes^{2} (in Latin). Berlin: Weidmann, [1905] 1954. Compiled by Nicholas Palmer, revised by Tony Honoré for Oxford Text Archive, 1984. Prepared for online use by R.W.B. Salway, 1999. Preface, books 1–8. Online at University College London Archived 26 August 2009 at the Wayback Machine and the University of Grenoble. Accessed 25 August 2009.
  - Unknown edition (in Latin). Online at AncientRome.ru. Accessed 15 August 2009.
- Epitome de Caesaribus.
  - Banchich, Thomas M., trans. A Booklet About the Style of Life and the Manners of the Imperatores. Canisius College Translated Texts 1. Buffalo, NY: Canisius College, 2009. Online at De Imperatoribus Romanis. Accessed 15 August 2009.
- Eusebius of Caesarea.
  - Historia Ecclesiastica (Church History).
    - McGiffert, Arthur Cushman, trans. Church History. From Nicene and Post-Nicene Fathers, Second Series, Vol. 1. Edited by Philip Schaff and Henry Wace. Buffalo, NY: Christian Literature Publishing Co., 1890. Revised and edited for New Advent by Kevin Knight. Online at New Advent. Accessed 25 August 2009.
  - Vita Constantini (Life of Constantine).
    - Richardson, Ernest Cushing, trans. Life of Constantine. From Nicene and Post-Nicene Fathers, Second Series, Vol. 1. Edited by Philip Schaff and Henry Wace. Buffalo, NY: Christian Literature Publishing Co., 1890. Revised and edited for New Advent by Kevin Knight. Online at New Advent. Accessed 25 August 2009.
- Festus. Breviarium.
  - Banchich, Thomas M., and Jennifer A. Meka, trans. Breviarium of the Accomplishments of the Roman People. Canisius College Translated Texts 2. Buffalo, NY: Canisius College, 2001. Online at De Imperatoribus Romanis. Accessed 15 August 2009.
- Lactantius. De Mortibus Persecutorum (On the Deaths of the Persecutors).
  - Fletcher, William, trans. Of the Manner in Which the Persecutors Died. From Nicene and Post-Nicene Fathers, Second Series, Vol. 7. Edited by Alexander Roberts, James Donaldson, and A. Cleveland Coxe. Buffalo, NY: Christian Literature Publishing Co., 1886. Revised and edited for New Advent by Kevin Knight. Online at New Advent. Accessed 25 August 2009.
- XII Panegyrici Latini (Twelve Latin Panegyrics).
  - Nixon, C.E.V., and Barbara Saylor Rodgers, ed. and trans. In Praise of Later Roman Emperors: The Panegyrici Latini. Berkeley: University of California Press, 2015.
- Zosimus. Historia Nova (New History).
  - Unknown, trans. The History of Count Zosimus. London: Green and Champlin, 1814. Online at Tertullian. Accessed 15 August 2009.
    This edition and translation is not very good. The pagination is broken in several places, there are many typographical errors (including several replacements of "Julian" with "Jovian" and "Constantine" with "Constantius"). It is nonetheless the only translation of the Historia Nova in the public domain.

=== Modern sources ===
- Barnes, T. D. (7 December 1973). "Lactantius and Constantine". The Journal of Roman Studies. 63: 29–46. doi:10.2307/299163. JSTOR 299163. S2CID 163051414.
- Barnes, Timothy D. (1981). Constantine and Eusebius. Cambridge, MA: Harvard University Press. ISBN 978-0-674-16531-1.
- Barnes, Timothy D. (1982). The New Empire of Diocletian and Constantine. Cambridge, MA: Harvard University Press. ISBN 0-674-28066-0.
- Bleckmann, Bruno. "Diocletianus." In Brill's New Pauly, Volume 4, edited by Hubert Cancik and Helmut Schneider, 429–438. Leiden: Brill, 2002. ISBN 90-04-12259-1
- Bowman, Alan K., Peter Garnsey, and Averil Cameron. The Cambridge Ancient History, Volume XII: The Crisis of Empire. Cambridge University Press, 2005. ISBN 0-521-30199-8
- Brown, Peter. The Rise of Western Christendom. Oxford: Blackwell Publishing, 2003. ISBN 0-631-22138-7
- von Bülow, Gerda (2023). "Die Palastbauten des Kaisers Galerius als Zeugnis für die kaiserliche Machtpräsentation in der Metropole und in der Provinz" [The palace buildings of Emperor Galerius as evidence of the imperial display of power in the metropolis and the provinces]. In Mihailescu-Bîrliba, Lucreţiu; Piso, Ioan (eds.). Romans and Natives in the Danubian Provinces (1st–6th C. AD). Philippika. Vol. 173. Wiesbaden: Harrassowitz. pp. 567–586. ISBN 978-3-447-39440-6.
- Burgess, R.W. "The Date of the Persecution of Christians in the Army". Journal of Theological Studies 47:1 (1996): 157–158.
- Corcoran, Simon. The Empire of the Tetrarchs: Imperial Pronouncements and Government, AD 284–324. Oxford: Clarendon Press, 1996. ISBN 0-19-815304-X
- Corcoran, "Before Constantine", Simon. "Before Constantine." In The Cambridge Companion to the Age of Constantine, edited by Noel Lenski, 35–58. New York: Cambridge University Press, 2006. Hardcover ISBN 0-521-81838-9 Paperback ISBN 0-521-52157-2
- Elliott, T. G. The Christianity of Constantine the Great. Scranton, PA: University of Scranton Press, 1996. ISBN 0-940866-59-5
- Gibbon, Edward, 'Decline and Fall of the Roman Empire', Chapter 14
- Harries, Jill. Law and Empire in Late Antiquity. Cambridge: Cambridge University Press, 1999. Hardcover ISBN 0-521-41087-8 Paperback ISBN 0-521-42273-6
- Helgeland, John. "Christians and the Roman Army A.D. 173–337." Church History 43:2 (1974): 149–163, 200.
- Jones, A. H. M.; Martindale, J. R.; Morris, John, eds. (1971). "C. Galerius Valerius Maximianus 9". Prosopography of the Later Roman Empire. Cambridge: Cambridge University Press. pp. 574–575.
- Jones, A.H.M. The Later Roman Empire, 284–602: A Social, Economic and Administrative Survey. Baltimore: Johns Hopkins University, 1986.
- Kuhoff, Wolfgang (2001). Diokletian und die Epoche der Tetrarchie. Das römische Reich zwischen Krisenbewältigung und Neuaufbau (284–313 n. Chr.) [Diocletian and the era of the Tetrarchy. The Roman Empire between crisis management and reconstruction (284-313 AD)]. Frankfurt: Lang. ISBN 3-631-36792-9.
- Leadbetter, Bill (2010). Galerius and the Will of Diocletian. London: Routledge. ISBN 978-0-415-40488-4.
- Lenski, Noel. "The Reign of Constantine." In The Cambridge Companion to the Age of Constantine, edited by Noel Lenski, 59–90. New York: Cambridge University Press, 2006b. Hardcover ISBN 0-521-81838-9 Paperback ISBN 0-521-52157-2
- Mackay, Christopher S. "Lactantius and the Succession to Diocletian." Classical Philology 94:2 (1999): 198–209.
- Mathisen, Ralph W. "Diocletian (284–305 AD.)." De Imperatoribus Romanis (1997). Accessed 16 February 2008.
- Odahl, Charles Matson. Constantine and the Christian Empire. New York: Routledge, 2004. Hardcover ISBN 0-415-17485-6 Paperback ISBN 0-415-38655-1
- Pohlsander, Hans. The Emperor Constantine. London & New York: Routledge, 2004a. Hardcover ISBN 0-415-31937-4 Paperback ISBN 0-415-31938-2
- Pohlsander, Hans. "Constantine I (306 – 337 AD)." De Imperatoribus Romanis (2004b). Accessed 16 December 2007.
- Potter, David S. (2004). The Roman Empire at Bay: AD 180–395. New York: Routledge. ISBN 0-415-10057-7.
- Rees, Roger (2004). Diocletian and the Tetrarchy. Edinburgh, UK: Edinburgh University Press. ISBN 9780748616602.
- Southern, Pat. (2001). The Roman Empire from Severus to Constantine. New York: Routledge. ISBN 0-415-23944-3.
- Rostovtzeff, Michael. The Social and Economic History of the Roman Empire. Oxford: Oxford University Press, 1966. ISBN 978-0-19-814231-7
- Treadgold, Warren. A History of the Byzantine State and Society. Stanford: Stanford University Press, 1997. ISBN 0-8047-2630-2
- Williams, Stephen. Diocletian and the Roman Recovery. New York: Routledge, 1997. ISBN 0-415-91827-8

Galerius Born: c. 258 Died: May 311
Regnal titles
Preceded by Diocletian	Roman emperor 305–311; With: Constantius I, Severus II, Constantine I, Maxentius, Licinius, Maximian and Maximinus II	Succeeded by Maximinus Daza, Licinius and Constantine I
Political offices
Preceded by Diocletian; Maximian	Roman consul 294 with Constantius Chlorus	Succeeded by Nummius Tuscus; G. Annius Anullinus
Preceded by Diocletian; Constantius Chlorus	Roman consul 297 with Maximian	Succeeded by Anicius Faustus Paulinus; Virius Gallus
Preceded by Diocletian; Maximian	Roman consul 300 with Constantius Chlorus	Succeeded by T. Flavius Postumius Titianus; Virius Nepotianus
Preceded by T. Flavius Postumius Titianus; Virius Nepotianus	Roman consul 302 with Constantius Chlorus	Succeeded by Diocletian; Maximian
Preceded by Diocletian; Maximian	Roman consul 305–308 with Constantius Chlorus, Maximian, Constantine I, Valerius Severus, Maximinus Daza, Diocletian, Maxentius, Valerius Romulus	Succeeded by Licinius; Constantine I Maxentius; Valerius Romulus
Preceded by Tatius Andronicus; Pompeius Probus; Maxentius	Roman consul 311 with Maximinus Daza , G. Ceionius Rufius Volusianus, Aradius Rufinus	Succeeded by Constantine I Licinius; Maxentius
