= Constantius Chlorus =

Roman emperor from 305 to 306

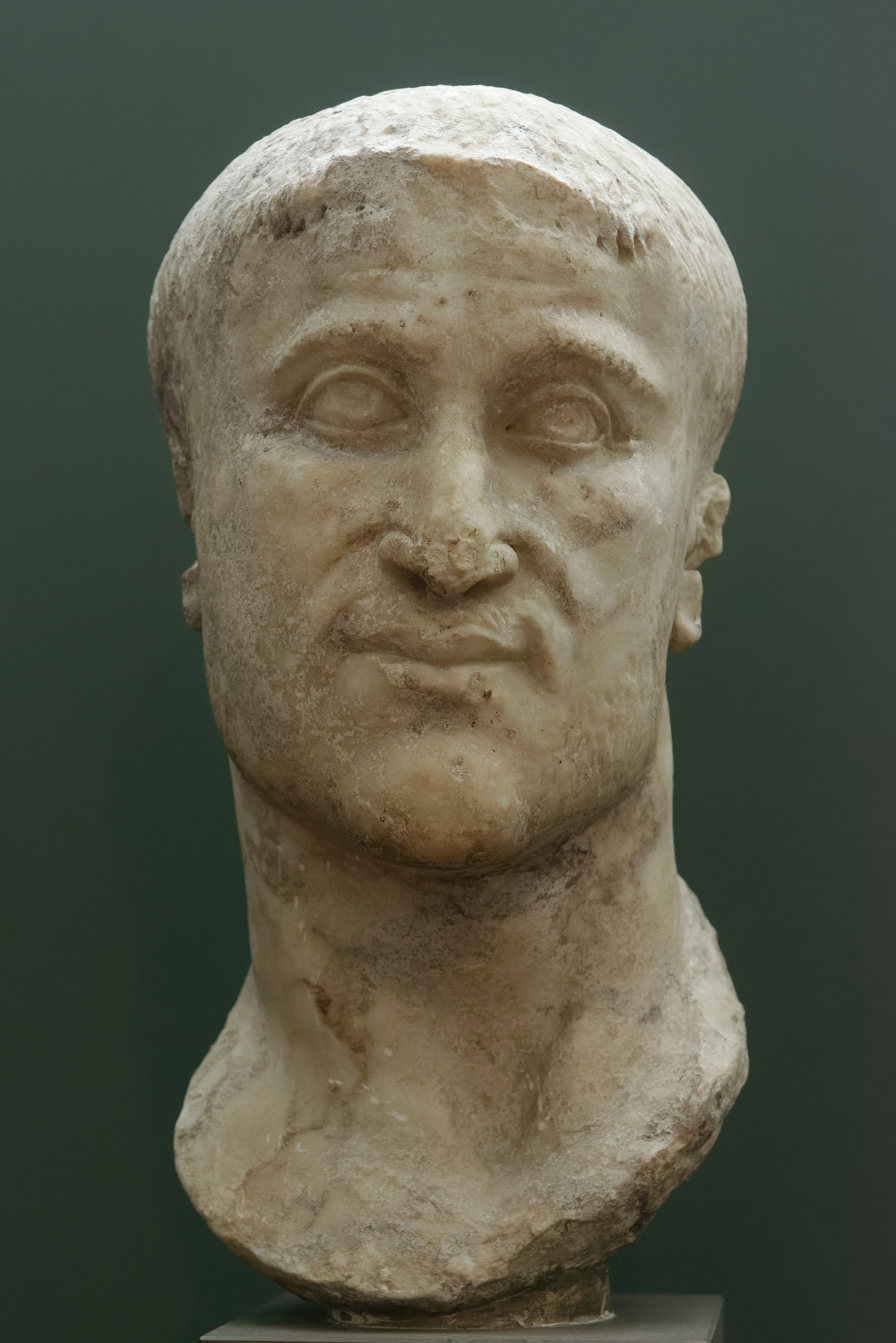
- Portrait usually identified with that of Constantius, Ny Carlsberg Glyptotek

Roman emperor
- Augustus: 1 May 305 – 25 July 306 (with Galerius in the East)
- Predecessor: Maximian
- Successor: Severus II (officially); Constantine I (rebelled)
- Caesar: 1 March 293 – 1 May 305
- Born: Flavius Constantius; 31 March c. 250; Moesia Superior
- Died: 25 July 306 (aged c. 56); Eboracum, Roman Britain (present-day York, England)
- Spouse: Helena and Theodora
- Issue among others: Constantine the Great; Flavius Dalmatius; Julius Constantius; Flavia Julia Constantia
Names
- Marcus Flavius Valerius Constantius (Note: This is the name given by Timothy D. Barnes and the ODB. PLRE omits the praenomen, but does not elaborate. "Marcus" appears in some inscriptions, but a few others use "Gaius" instead. This may just be a confusion, as ordinary people "had become unaccustomed to varying praenomina, the last imperial dynasty to differentiate them having been that of Septimius Severus". Either way, praenomina were no longer used by this time, and emperors after Galerius stopped using them altogether.)
Regnal name
- Imperator Caesar Marcus Flavius Constantius Augustus
- Dynasty: Constantinian
- Father: Maximian (adoptive)
- Mother: Claudia (alleged)
- Religion: Ancient Roman religion

Marcus Flavius Valerius Constantius (c. 250 – 25 July 306), also called Constantius I, was a Roman emperor from 305 to 306, and was the father of Constantine the Great, the first Christian emperor of Rome. He was one of the four original members of the Tetrarchy established by Diocletian, first serving as caesar from 293 to 305 and then ruling as augustus until his death. The nickname Chlorus (Ancient Greek: Χλωρός, lit. 'the Pale') was first popularized by Byzantine-era historians and not used during the emperor's lifetime.

As a soldier of humble origin, Constantius had a distinguished military career and rose to the top ranks of the army. Around 289, he divorced Helena, the mother of Constantine the Great, to marry a daughter of Emperor Maximian, and in 293 was added to the imperial college by Maximian's colleague Diocletian. Assigned to rule Gaul, Constantius defeated the usurper Carausius there and his successor Allectus in Britain, and campaigned extensively along the Rhine frontier, defeating the Alamanni and Franks. When the Diocletianic Persecution was announced in 303, Constantius ordered the demolition of churches but did not actively hunt down Christians in his domain. Upon becoming senior emperor in May 305, Constantius launched a successful punitive campaign against the Picts beyond the Antonine Wall. He died suddenly at Eboracum (York) in July the following year.

After Constantius's death, the army, perhaps at his own instigation, immediately acclaimed his son Constantine as emperor. This act contributed to the collapse of the Diocletianic tetrarchy, sparking a series of civil wars that ended only when Constantine finally united the whole Roman Empire under his rule in 324. According to the Oxford Classical Dictionary, "Constantinian propaganda bedevils assessment of Constantius, yet he appears to have been an able general and a generous ruler". His descendants, the Constantinian dynasty, ruled the Empire until the death of his grandson Julian in 363.

== Life ==
=== Early career ===
Constantius's birthday was 31 March; the year is unknown, but his career and the age of his eldest son imply a date no later than c. 250. Constantius was a Thracian or an Illyrian. (Note: On the other hand, Timothy Barnes argues that when ancient writers used the words Illyricum and Thrace/Thracians to describe where Constantius came from, they were speaking of broad geographic terms rather than precise origins.) He was born in Moesia Superior (later Dacia Ripensis), a Roman province on the south bank of the Middle Danube. According to the unreliable Historia Augusta he was the son of Eutropius, a nobleman from the province of Moesia Superior, and Claudia, a niece of the emperors Claudius Gothicus and Quintillus. The same source also gives Claudius the nomina "Flavius Valerius" to strengthen his connection to Constantius. Modern historians suspect this maternal connection to be a genealogical fabrication created by his son Constantine I, and that his family was of humble origins. (Note: His family probably adopted the name "Flavius" after being granted citizenship by one of these emperors, as it was common for "new Romans" to adopt the names of their former masters.) Constantine probably sought to dissociate his father's background from the memory of Maximian.

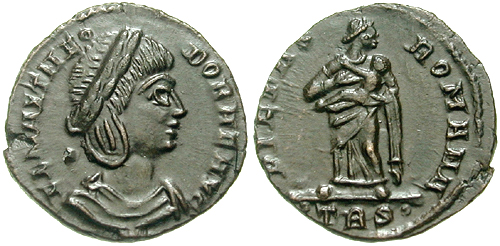
Coin showing the Augusta Flavia Maximiana Theodora, Constantius's second wife, with the goddess Pietas on the reverse

Constantius was a member of the Protectores Augusti Nostri under the emperor Aurelian and fought in the east against the secessionist Palmyrene Empire. While the claim that he had been made a dux under the emperor Probus is probably a fabrication, he certainly attained the rank of tribunus within the army, and during the reign of Carus he was raised to the position of praeses, or governor, of the province of Dalmatia. It has been conjectured that he switched allegiances to support the claims of the future emperor Diocletian just before Diocletian defeated Carinus, the son of Carus, at the Battle of the Margus in July 285.

In 286, Diocletian elevated a military colleague, Maximian, to the throne as co-emperor of the western provinces, while Diocletian took over the eastern provinces, beginning the process that would eventually see the division of the Roman Empire into two halves, a Western and an Eastern portion. By 288, his period as governor now over, Constantius had been made praetorian prefect in the west under Maximian. Throughout 287 and into 288, Constantius, under the command of Maximian, was involved in a war against the Alamanni, carrying out attacks on the territory of the barbarian tribes across the Rhine and Danube rivers. To consolidate the ties between himself and Emperor Maximian, Constantius married the emperor's daughter, Theodora.

=== Elevation as Caesar ===
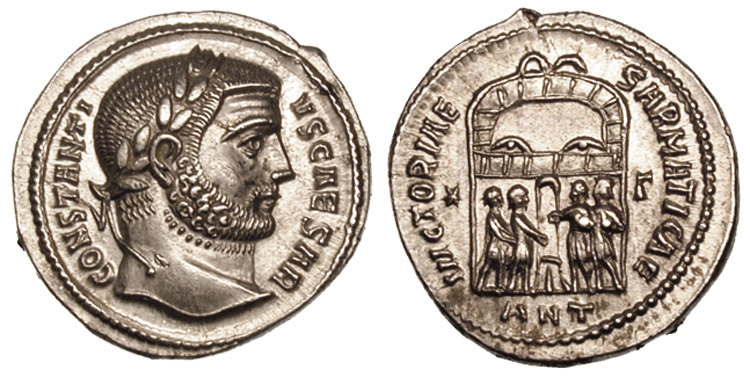
On the reverse of this argenteus struck in Antioch under Constantius Chlorus, the tetrarchs are sacrificing to celebrate a victory against the Sarmatians.

By 293, Diocletian, conscious of the ambitions of his co-emperor for his new son-in-law, allowed Maximian to promote Constantius in a new power sharing arrangement known as the Tetrarchy. The eastern and western provinces would each be ruled by an augustus, supported by a caesar. Both caesares had the right of succession once the ruling augustus died.

At Mediolanum (Milan) on 1 March 293, Constantius was formally appointed as Maximian's caesar. He adopted Diocletian's nomen (family name) "Valerius", and, being equated with Maximian, also took on "Herculius". His given command consisted of Gaul, Britannia and possibly Hispania. Diocletian, the eastern augustus, in order to keep the balance of power in the imperium, elevated Galerius as his caesar, possibly on 21 May 293 at Philippopolis (Plovdiv). Constantius was the more senior of the two caesares, and on official documents he always took precedence, being mentioned before Galerius. Constantius's capital was to be located at Augusta Treverorum (Trier).

Constantius's first task on becoming caesar was to deal with the Roman usurper Carausius who had declared himself emperor in Britannia and northern Gaul in 286. In late 293, Constantius defeated the forces of Carausius in Gaul, capturing Bononia (Boulogne-sur-Mer). Carausius was then assassinated by his rationalis (finance officer) Allectus, who assumed command of the British provinces until his death in 296.

Constantius spent the next two years neutralising the threat of the Franks who were the allies of Allectus, as northern Gaul remained under the control of the British usurper until at least 295. He also battled against the Alamanni, achieving some victories at the mouth of the Rhine in 295. Administrative concerns meant he made at least one trip to Italy during this time as well. Only when he felt ready (and only when Maximian finally came to relieve him at the Rhine frontier) did he assemble two invasion fleets with the intent of crossing the English Channel. The first was entrusted to Julius Asclepiodotus, Constantius's long-serving Praetorian prefect, who sailed from the mouth of the Seine, while the other, under the command of Constantius himself, was launched from his base at Bononia. The fleet under Asclepiodotus landed near the Isle of Wight, and his army encountered the forces of Allectus, resulting in the defeat and death of the usurper. Constantius in the meantime occupied Londinium (London), saving the city from an attack by Frankish mercenaries who were now roaming the province without a paymaster. Constantius massacred all of them.

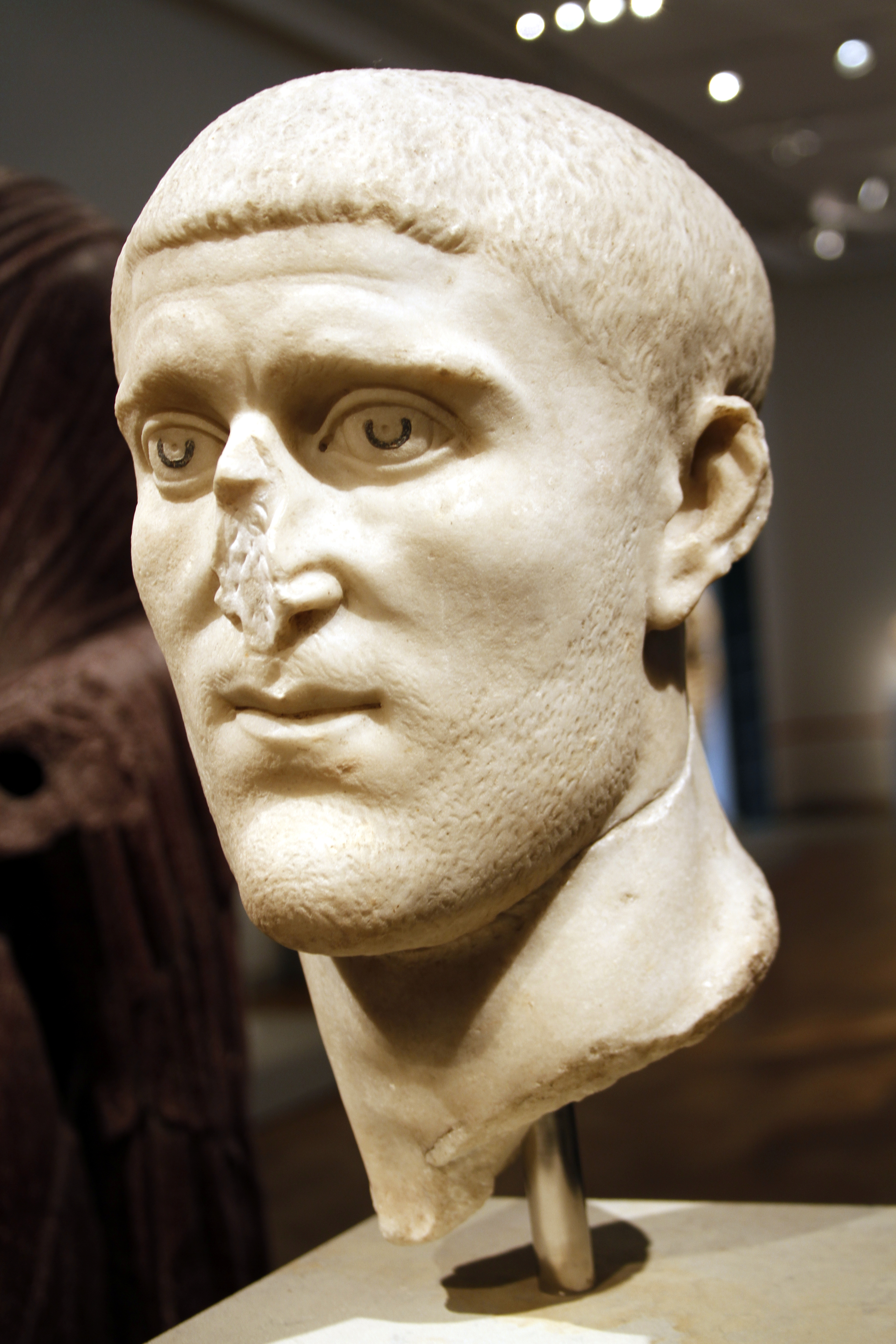
Portrait head of Tetrarch, most likely Constantius Chlorus.

Constantius remained in Britannia for a few months, replaced most of Allectus's officers, and the British provinces were probably at this time subdivided along the lines of Diocletian's other administrative reforms of the Empire. The result was the division of Britannia Superior into Maxima Caesariensis and Britannia Prima, while Flavia Caesariensis and Britannia Secunda were carved out of Britannia Inferior. He also restored Hadrian's Wall and its forts.

Later in 298, Constantius fought in the Battle of Lingones (Langres) against the Alemanni. He was shut up in the city, but was relieved by his army after six hours and defeated the enemy. He defeated them again at Vindonissa thereby strengthening the defences of the Rhine frontier. In 300, he fought against the Franks on the Rhine frontier, and as part of his overall strategy to buttress the frontier, Constantius settled the Franks in the deserted parts of Gaul to repopulate the devastated areas. Nevertheless, over the next three years the Rhine frontier continued to occupy Constantius's attention.

From 303 – the beginning of the Diocletianic Persecution – Constantius began to enforce the imperial edicts dealing with the persecution of Christians, which ordered the destruction of churches. The campaign was avidly pursued by Galerius, who noticed that Constantius was well-disposed towards the Christians, and who saw it as a method of advancing his career prospects with the aging Diocletian. Of the four Tetrarchs, Constantius made the least effort to implement the decrees in the western provinces that were under his direct authority, limiting himself to knocking down a handful of churches. Eusebius denied that Constantius destroyed Christian buildings, but Lactantius records that he did.

=== Accession as Augustus and death ===
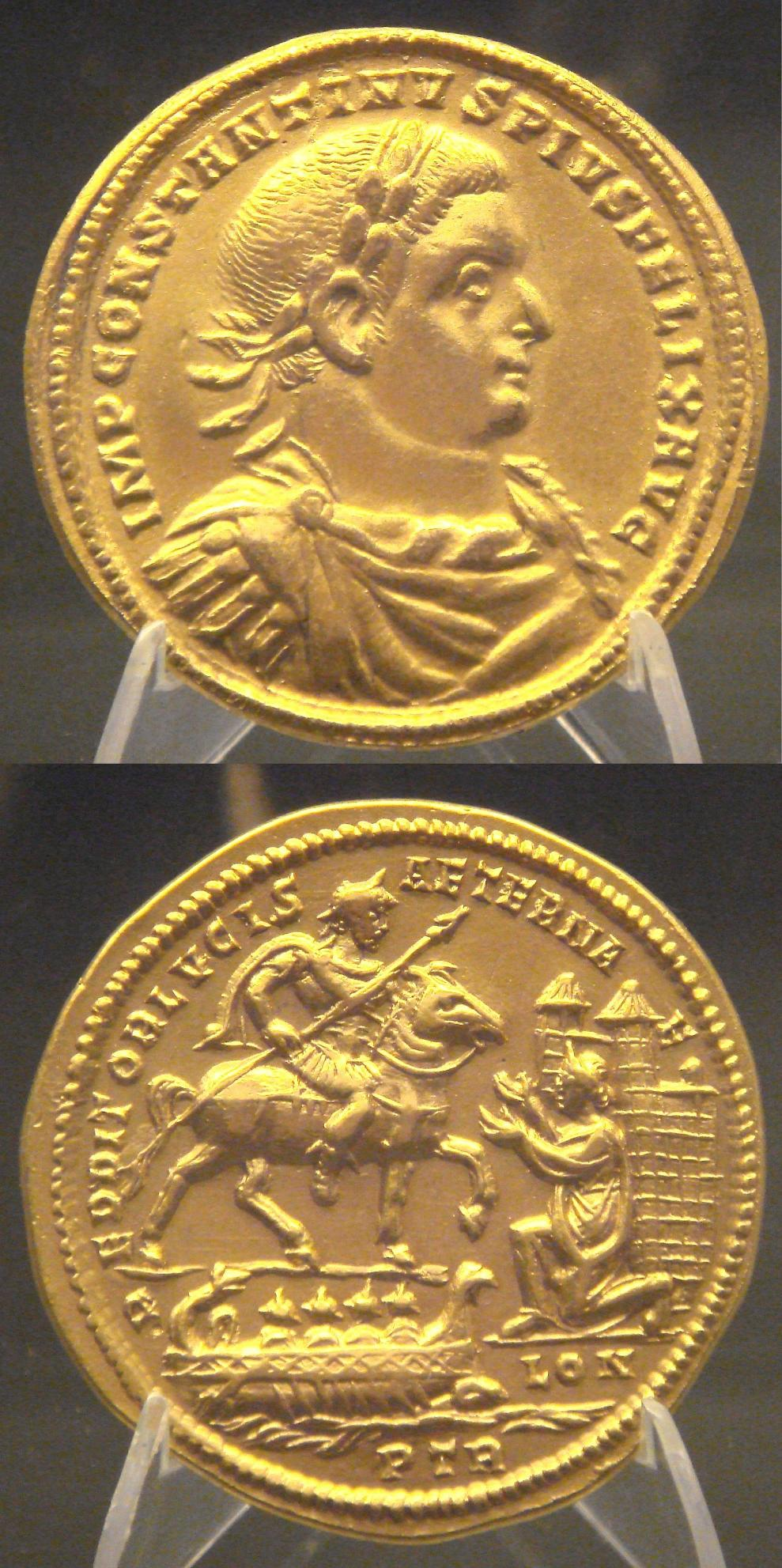
Copy of a medal of Constantius I capturing Londinium (inscribed as LON) after defeating Allectus. The original was part of the Beaurains Treasure from Arras, France.

Between 303 and 305, Galerius began maneuvering to ensure that he would be in a position to take power from Constantius after the death of Diocletian. In 304, Maximian met with Galerius, probably to discuss the succession issue and Constantius either was not invited or could not make it due to the situation on the Rhine. Although prior to 303 there appeared to be tacit agreement among the Tetrarchs that Constantius's son Constantine and Maximian's son Maxentius were to be promoted to the rank of caesar once Diocletian and Maximian had resigned the purple, by the end of 304 Galerius had convinced Diocletian (who in turn convinced Maximian) to appoint Galerius's nominees Severus and Maximinus as caesares.

Diocletian and Maximian stepped down as co-emperors on 1 May 305, possibly due to Diocletian's poor health. Before the assembled armies at Mediolanum, Maximian removed his purple cloak and handed it to Severus, the new caesar, and proclaimed Constantius as augustus. The same scene played out at Nicomedia (İzmit) under the authority of Diocletian. Constantius, notionally the senior emperor, ruled the western provinces, while Galerius took the eastern provinces. Constantine, disappointed in his hopes to become a caesar, fled the court of Galerius after Constantius had asked Galerius to release his son as Constantius was ill. Constantine joined his father's court at the coast of Gaul, just as he was preparing to campaign in Britain.

In 305, Constantius crossed over into Britain, travelled to the far north of the island and launched a military expedition against the Picts, claiming a victory against them and the title Britannicus Maximus II by 7 January 306. After retiring to Eboracum (York) for the winter, Constantius had planned to continue the campaign, but on 25 July 306 he died. As he was dying, Constantius recommended his son to the army as his successor; consequently, Constantine was declared emperor by the legions at York.

== Family ==
Constantius was married to Helena, who was probably from Nicomedia in Asia Minor. They had one son, the future emperor Constantine the Great.

In 289, political developments forced him to divorce Helena. He married Theodora, Maximian's daughter. They had six children:

- Flavius Dalmatius
- Julius Constantius
- Flavius Hannibalianus
- Flavia Julia Constantia
- Anastasia, married to Bassianus
- Eutropia

The name of Anastasia (Koine Greek: Ἀναστασία, romanized: Anastasía, lit. 'resurrection') may indicate a sympathy with Christian or Jewish culture.

=== Family tree ===
Family of Constantius Chlorus

Emperors are shown with a rounded-corner border with their dates as Augusti, names with a thicker border appear in both sections

1: Constantine's parents and half-siblings

Maximian; 286–305; adoptive father
Helena | Constantius Chlorus; 250–306 | Flavia Maximiana Theodora
Constantine I; 306–337 | Flavius Dalmatius | Hannibalianus | Flavia Julia Constantia | Licinius; 308–324 | Anastasia | Bassianus
Galla | Julius Constantius | Basilina | Licinius II | Eutropia | Virius Nepotianus
Hannibalianus | Constantina | Constantius Gallus | Julian; 360–363 | Helena | Nepotianus

2: Constantine's children

Minervina | Constantine I; 306–337 | Fausta
Crispus | Constantine II; 337–340 | Constans; 337–350 | Hannibalianus | Constantina | Constantius Gallus
Faustina | Constantius II; 337–361 | Helena | Julian; 360–363
Gratian; 367–383 | Constantia

CONSTANTINIAN DYNASTY detailed family tree

Afranius Hannibalianus | Eutropia | Maximian; Western emperor
Theodora | Constantius I Chlorus; Western emperor 250-305-306 | Helena; 250–330 | Maxentius; Western emperor
Constantia; 293–330 ∞ Licinius; 250-308-324-325 | Flavius Dalmatius censor | 1.Galla | Julius Constantius d. 337 ∞ 2.Basilina | Anastasia | Eutropia | Fausta; 289–326 | Constantine I the Great; 272-306-337 | Minervina
Dalmatius caesar | Hannibalianus | (1) Constantius Gallus | (2) Julian; 331-360-363 | Helena d. 360 | Constantina ∞ 1.Hannibalianus; 2.Constantius Gallus | Constantius II; 317-337-361 ∞ Faustina | Constantine II; Western emperor 316-337-340 | Constans I Western emperor 320-337-350 | (daughter) ∞ Justus | Crispus d. 326
Jovian; 331-363-364 | Marina Severa | Valentinian I Western emperor VALENTINIANIC DYNASTY | Justina
Constantia; 361–383 | Gratian; Western emperor 359-367-383 | Galla | Theodosius I Eastern emperor THEODOSIAN DYNASTY

== Legend ==
=== Christian legends ===
As the father of Constantine, a number of Christian legends have grown up around Constantius. Eusebius's Life of Constantine claims that Constantius was himself a Christian, although he pretended to be a pagan, and while Caesar under Diocletian, took no part in the Emperor's persecutions. It was claimed that his first wife, Helena, found the True Cross.

=== British legends ===
Constantius's activities in Britain were remembered in medieval Welsh legend, which frequently confused his family with that of Magnus Maximus, who also was said to have wed a Saint Elen and sired a son named Constantine while in Britain. Henry of Huntingdon's History of the English identified Constantius's wife Helen as British and Geoffrey of Monmouth repeated the claim in his 1136 History of the Kings of Britain. Geoffrey related that Constantius was sent to Britain by the Senate after Asclepiodotus (here a British king) was overthrown by Coel of Colchester. Coel submitted to Constantius and agreed to pay tribute to Rome, but died only eight days later. Constantius married his daughter Helena and became king of Britain. He and Helena had a son, Constantine, who succeeded to the throne of Britain when his father died at York eleven years later. These accounts have no historical validity: Constantius had divorced Helena before he went to Britain.

Similarly, the History of the Britons traditionally ascribed to Nennius claims the inscribed tomb of "Constantius the Emperor" was still present in the 9th century in the Roman fort of Segontium (near present-day Caernarfon, in North Wales). David Nash Ford credited the monument to Constantine, the supposed son of Magnus Maximus and Elen, who was said to have ruled over the area prior to the Irish invasions.

== Sources ==
=== Ancient sources ===
- Aurelius Victor, Epitome de Caesaribus
- Liber de Caesaribus of Sextus Aurelius Victor. Translated by Bird, H. W. Liverpool University Press. 1994.
- Zosimus, Historia Nova

=== Modern sources ===
- Barnes, Timothy David (1981). Constantine and Eusebius. Cambridge, Mass.: Harvard University Press. ISBN 0-674-16530-6. OCLC 7459753.
- Barnes, Timothy (2011). Constantine: Dynasty, Religion and Power in the Later Roman Empire. Oxford: Wiley-Blackwell. ISBN 978-1-405-11727-2.
- Birley, Anthony (2005), The Roman Government in Britain, Oxford University Press, ISBN 978-0-19-925237-4
- DiMaio, Robert, "Constantius I Chlorus (305–306 A.D.)", De Imperatoribus Romanis, 1996.
- Jones, A.H.M.; J.R. Martindale & J. Morris (1971). "Fl. Val. Constantius 12". Prosopography of the Later Roman Empire. Vol. 1. Cambridge University Press. ISBN 0-521-07233-6.
- Kuhoff, Wolfgang (2001). Diokletian und die Epoche der Tetrarchie. Das römische Reich zwischen Krisenbewältigung und Neuaufbau (284–313 n. Chr.). Frankfurt am Main: Peter Lang.
- Murray, Alexander (1999). From Roman to Merovingian Gaul: A Reader. University of Toronto Press. ISBN 1442604131.
- Odahl, Charles (2010). Constantine and the Christian Empire. Routledge. ISBN 978-1136961281.
- Potter, David Stone, The Roman Empire at Bay, AD 180–395, Routledge, 2004
- Seeck, Otto, "Constantius 1", Realencyclopädie der classischen Altertumswissenschaft, volume 7 (IV.1), Metzlerscher Verlag (Stuttgart, 1900), columns 1040–1043.
- Southern, Pat. The Roman Empire from Severus to Constantine, Routledge, 2001

Constantius Chlorus Constantinian dynasty Born: 31 March c. 250 Died: 25 July 306
Regnal titles
| Preceded by Maximian | Roman emperor 305–306; With: Galerius (east) | Succeeded by Severus II (west); Constantine I (west); Galerius (east) |
Political offices
| Preceded by Diocletian Augustus; Maximian Augustus | Roman consul 294 with Galerius Augustus | Succeeded by Nummius Tuscus; G. Annius Anullinus |
| Preceded by Nummius Tuscus; G. Annius Anullinus | Roman consul II; 296 with Diocletian Augustus | Succeeded by Diocletian Augustus; Galerius Augustus |
| Preceded by Diocletian Augustus; Maximian Augustus | Roman consul III; 300 with Galerius Augustus | Succeeded by T. Flavius Postumius Titianus; Virius Nepotianus |
| Preceded by T. Flavius Postumius Titianus; Virius Nepotianus | Roman consul IV; 302 with Galerius Augustus | Succeeded by Diocletian Augustus; Maximian Augustus |
| Preceded by Diocletian Augustus; Maximian Augustus | Roman consul V 305–306 with Galerius Augustus | Succeeded by Maximian Augustus; Constantine Augustus; Severus Augustus; Maximinus Augustus; Galerius Augustus |
Legendary titles
| Preceded by Coel | King of Britain; 305–306 | Succeeded by Constantine I |
