= List of museums in Tuscany =

This is a list of museums in Tuscany, Italy.

| image | name | description | address | city | coordinates | type |
|---|---|---|---|---|---|---|
| | Ospedale degli Innocenti | Italian museum | Piazza Santissima Annunziata | Florence | 43.77639°N 11.26111°E | orphanage art museum |
| | National Archaeological Museum | archaeological museum of Florence, Italy | Piazza Santissima Annunziata 9 B | Florence | 43.776222°N 11.26225°E | archaeological museum national museum |
| | Chianciano Museum of Art | art museum | Viale della Libertà, 280 | Chianciano Terme | 43.05020°N 11.82008°E | art museum |
| | Diocesan Museum in Cortona | museum in Cortona | piazza del Duomo, 1 | Cortona | 43.27213°N 11.983145°E | art museum diocesan museum |
| | Museum Horne | museum in Florence | via de' Benci, 6 | Florence | 43.76751°N 11.25961°E | art museum |
| | Marino Marini Museum | | San Pancrazio, 1 – Firenze | Florence | 43.7718°N 11.25°E | art museum |
| | Museo delle Porcellane | | piazza Pitti 1 | Florence | 43.762°N 11.25251°E | art museum |
| | Palazzo Mansi National Museum | art museum in Lucca, Italy | via Galli Tassi, 43 – Lucca | Lucca | 43.84361°N 10.49917°E | art museum national museum |
| | Villa Guinigi National Museum | art museum in Lucca, Italy | via della Quarquonia, 4 – Lucca | Lucca | 43.845°N 10.5123°E | art museum |
| | Centro per l'arte contemporanea Luigi Pecci | contemporary arts museum and arts centre in Prato, Italy | della Repubblica, 277 – Prato | Prato | 43.86111°N 11.10833°E | art museum |
| | SanGimignano1300 | art museum | Via Costarella, n 3 | San Gimignano | 43.46608°N 11.04230°E | art museum |
| | Museo Civico di Sansepolcro | art museum | via N. Aggiunti, 65 | Sansepolcro | 43.57158°N 12.14150°E | art museum |
| | Museo dell'Opera Metropolitana del Duomo | museum of Siena cathedral | | Siena | 43.3175°N 11.32917°E | art museum |
| | Santa Maria della Scala | art museum | Piazza del Duomo (Siena), 2 | Siena | 43.31705°N 11.32845°E | art museum |
| | Pinacoteca Nazionale | national art museum in Siena | via San Pietro, 29 – Siena | Siena | 43.31562°N 11.33051°E | art museum national museum |
| | Bargello | museum in Florence, Italy. | Via del Proconsolo, 4 | Florence | 43.7704°N 11.25801°E | art museum |
| | Museo dell'Opera del Duomo | art museum in Florence, Italy | piazza del Duomo (Firenze) 9 | Florence | 43.77306°N 11.25811°E | art museum |
| | Museum of San Marco | art museum in the former convent of San Marco in Florence, Italy | Piazza San Marco 3 | Florence | 43.7782°N 11.25933°E | art museum monastery |
| | Sant'Anna di Stazzema | | | Stazzema | 43.97417°N 10.27361°E | frazione military museum |
| | Stibbert Museum | | Federigo Stibbert, 26 – Firenze | Florence | 43.7929°N 11.2552°E | military museum |
| | Museo della Deportazione | military museum | di Cantagallo, 250 – Prato | Prato | 43.92296°N 11.09248°E | military museum |
| | Diocesan museum of sacred art (Arezzo) | | Palazzo Vescovile Piazza Duomo, 1 | Arezzo | 43.46706°N 11.88027°E | museum |
| | Museo di Storia Naturale di Firenze | museum | varie sedi | Florence | | museum |
| | Museo Galileo | Italian museum | Piazza dei Giudici 1 | Florence | 43.76776°N 11.25596°E | museum research institute |
| | Museo di Firenze com’era | | dell`Oriuolo, 24 – Firenze | Florence | 43.77244°N 11.26011°E | museum |
| | Loggia del Bigallo | | San Giovanni, 1 – Firenze | Florence | 43.77275°N 11.25526°E | museum |
| | Opificio delle pietre dure | institute of the Italian Ministry for Cultural Heritage based in Florence | Via Alfani, 78 | Florence | 43.77611°N 11.25898°E | museum |
| | Torrini | | | Florence | 43.77353°N 11.25640°E | museum |
| | Salvatore Ferragamo Museum | | Piazza Santa Trinita 5 rosso – Firenze | Florence | 43.769594°N 11.25099°E | museum |
| | Tribune of Galileo | | | Florence | 43.7644°N 11.2473°E | museum |
| | Museo etnologico delle Apuane | | Via Uliveti 33 | Massa | | museum |
| | Museo Civico di Montepulciano | | Via Ricci, 10 | Montepulciano | 43.09348°N 11.781°E | museum |
| | Archaeological Museum of Populonia | | Cittadella, 8 – Piombino | Piombino | 42.92344°N 10.522°E | museum |
| | Argentario Aquarium | | lungomare dei Navigatori 44 | Porto Santo Stefano | 42.4382°N 11.1197°E | museum |
| | Museo dell'Opera del Duomo | museum in Prato, Italy | del Duomo, 49 – Prato | Prato | 43.88206°N 11.09801°E | museum |
| | Prato textile museum | | S. Chiara, 24 – Prato | Prato | 43.87716°N 11.09877°E | museum |
| | Ecomuseo della Montagna Pistoiese | | Piazzetta Achilli, 7 | Province of Pistoia | | museum |
| | Casa Buonarroti | | Via Ghibellina 70 | Florence | 43.76990°N 11.26375°E | museum |
| | Museo Ideale Leonardo da Vinci | | Collinare, Vinci | Vinci | 43.78759°N 10.92672°E | museum |
| | Palace Medici Riccardi | palace and museum in Florence, Italy | Via Cavour | Florence | 43.77528°N 11.25528°E | museum administrative centre City palace |
| | Sant'Apollonia | former Benedictine convent | Via XXVII Aprile 1 | Florence | 43.77866°N 11.25656°E | museum |
| | Baratti and Populonia Archeological Park | | | Baratti | 42.9925°N 10.50056°E | national museum archaeological site |
| | Galleria dell'Accademia | art museum in Florence, Italy | Via Ricasoli, 58–60 | Florence | 43.77691°N 11.25848°E | national museum |
| | Museo Nazionale Alinari della Fotografia | national museum | Piazza Santa Maria Novella, 14 | piazza Santa Maria Novella | 43.773°N 11.24921°E | national museum |
| | Museo storia naturale di Pisa | Italian natural history museum at Pisa | via Roma, 79 – Calci | Calci | 43.72195°N 10.52334°E | natural history museum |
| | La Specola | | Via Romana 17 | Florence | 43.76449°N 11.24697°E | natural history museum |
| | Palazzo Nonfinito | | | Florence | 43.7717°N 11.2584°E | palace museum |
| | Palazzo Martelli | historic building and museum in Florence, Italy | Via Zannetti 8 | Florence | 43.7741°N 11.2535°E | palace museum |
| | Palazzo Blu | | Lungarno Gambacorti 9 | Pisa | 43.71565°N 10.39974°E | palace museum |
| | Studiolo of Francesco I | room in the Palazzo Vecchio, Florence | | Florence | 43.7691°N 11.2566°E | studiolo |
