= Baratti amphora =

Ancient Roman amphora

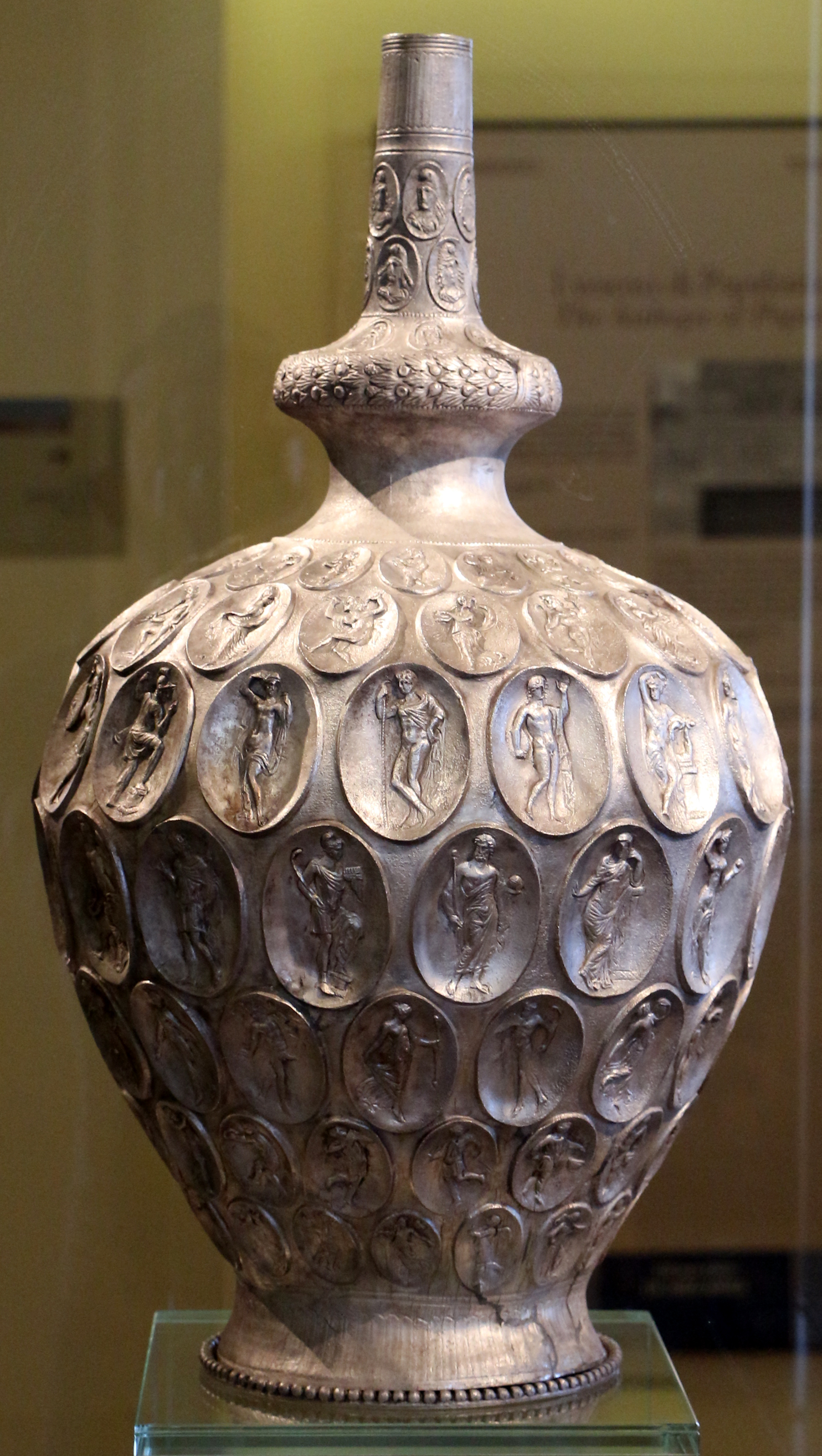
The Baratti amphora at the Archaeological Museum of Populonia

The Baratti amphora is a silver amphora, possibly from Antioch and dating to the late fourth century AD. It is a unique artistic masterpiece discovered by chance in 1968 off the coast of Baratti, Tuscany, Italy. Its origin, unique characteristics and construction method have been the subject or research by scholars of antiquity.

In 1968 the amphora was accidentally caught in the fishing net of fisherman Gaetano Graniero, near the harbor of Baratti in southern Tuscany. At the time of discovery, the amphora sustained damage by the anchor of the fishing boat. It was moved to the National Archaeological Museum of Florence in 1972 and was the subject of study and restoration for several years, given the fact that it had been in the sea for centuries. It was later moved to Archaeological Museum of Populonia, where it now resides.

The amphora is a vase of about 60 cm in height, and 35 cm in diameter. It weighs about 7 kg and is made of very pure silver, with no trace of gold. When in use, it could have contained about 22 liters of liquid. Claudio Arras, et al state that the techniques used for the construction of the amphora continue to puzzle modern scholars. The surface of the amphora is decorated, with 132 oval medallions, but it is still uncertain how these medallions were placed on the object, given that the amphora has no signs of welding, except between the body of the vase and its bottom. The material of the amphora was studied by using non-destructive X-ray fluorescence techniques.

The shape of the amphora and the depiction of Dionysus and his wife Ariadne on part of the body of the amphora suggest that it was intended for wine. But it is not clear if the amphora was built for actual use at banquets or was only intended for decorative or ritual purposes. It is also uncertain when the amphora was lost at sea near Tuscany, where it was shipped from and where it was destined for.

== See also ==
- Antioch chalice
- Seuso amphora
- Typology of Greek vase shapes
