= Libral standard =

Ancient coin standard

The libral standard compares the weight of coins to the bronze as, which originally weighed one Roman pound, but decreased over time to 1/2 pound (the semi-libral standard). It is often used in discussions of ancient cast coinage of central Italy, especially Etruscan coins and Roman Republican coinage. The adjective libral is related to libra, the Ancient Roman unit of weight, and is not related to the word liberal.

The libral standard began with the era of the so-called aes grave (heavy bronze) cast coinage of Rome, from circa 280 BC, where one as weighed one Roman pound (libra), or twelve Roman ounces (unciae). This changed when the weight of the aes grave was decreased to approximately 10 unciae (the "light libral standard") circa 265-217 BC, remaining at that level until about 217 BC. It then suddenly fell to 6 unciae (the "semi-libral standard") around the start of the second Punic war in about 217 BC, before finally falling still further until about 141 BC.

The libral/semi-libral standards were followed by the triental standards and the sextantal standard.

Many Greek city states (colonies) were founded on the Italian peninsula and Sicily during this time period; these are collectively referred to as Magna Graecia. The coinage of those city-states is more closely related to the rest of the ancient Greek world (which included many colonies along the Mediterranean and Black Sea coasts), and generally has no relationship to the Etruscan/Roman units.
