= Etruscan coinage =

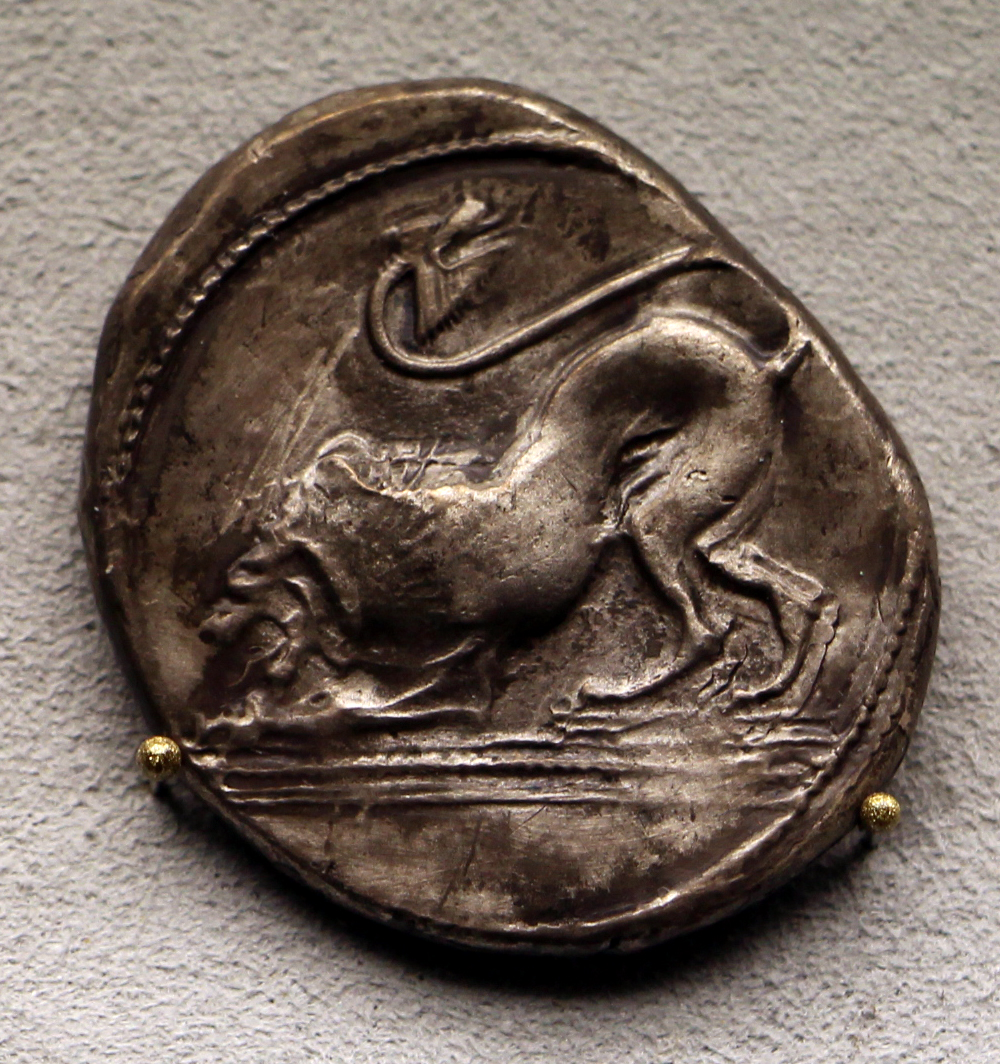
Tridrachm, 5th century

While some Etruscan coinage can be dated as far back as the 5th century BCE, the vast majority of Etruscan coinage dates to around the 3rd century BCE, spanning the time period of independent Etruscan city-states prior to their annexation by the Roman Republic.

Coinage was first introduced to the Etruscans through contact with the Western Greeks, with specific influence of uniface coin types from Cyprus and Ionia. The production of Etruscan coinage was not centralized or consistent, and consisted of independent minting from various city-states. Evidence that Greek coins circulated in Etruria is supported by finds in the 1868 Volterra hoard, in which coins from or closely copying Phocaea were found.

Coins struck in coastal Etruria tend to resemble Greek coins stylistically; they also followed the Attic weight standard. Conversely, the material fabric of coins produced in central Etruria closely resembles early Roman Republican bronzes, especially concerning in the production of large ramo secco currency bars and aes grave from Volterrae.

== History ==
=== Bronze ===
Volaterrae aes grave: dupondius
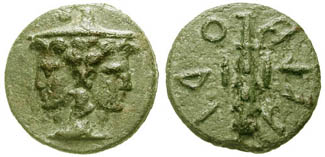
First side of the image: Janiform head wearing pointed petasos
Second side of the image: FELA-ODI (Etruscan Velathri) retrograde around club flanked by I-I
Æ Dupondius (257 g). 3rd century BC

The origin of Etruscan bronze coinage is to be sought in the central Italian pre-coinage aes rude ingots, or lumps and ramo secco and plain bronze bars, which circulated as currency throughout Italy from at least the 5th century BC. By c. 280 BC, the Roman libra or pound weighed about 325 g, subdivided into 12 unciae of about 27 g and 288 scripula of about 1,13 g. The cast round aes grave coinage of Volterra, Tarquinia, including bars, and the Chiana Valley with its associated struck unciae and semi-unciae, are all firmly dated to the 3rd century BC, including a series of oval shaped cast bronze possibly from Volsini. This cast coinage seems to mirror the extensive Roman series. The date of the inception of cast bronze coins is estimated to be about 280 BC and to have been progressively reduced in weight from libral to semi-libral at the outbreak of the Second Punic War in about 217 BC. Further reductions took place until the cast bronze gave way to struck sextantal bronze in about 214-212 BC, and the introduction of the silver 10-as denarius with its fractions, the quinarius (5-asses) and sestertius (2 1/2-asses).

Two large struck bronze series with Populonia and Vetulonia are close to the Roman post-semi-libral as standard that is dated by Crawford to about 215-211 BC, but may be earlier in date. The Etruscans were not frightened to experiment, as is illustrated by the case of an extraordinary struck bronze series with incuse reverses, presumably from Populonia and based on a hundred units (or centesimal system) which may correspond to the struck Roman sextantal as, theoretically of about 54 grams. An even more remarkable issue from a metrological point of view is one that I interpret as a dual-denominated decimal/uncial series, overstruck on earlier post semi-libral bronzes, while a similar, but slightly lighter issue seems tariffed /X or 11 centismae, both dateable to about 200 BC.

=== Silver ===
Pupluna - XX asses.
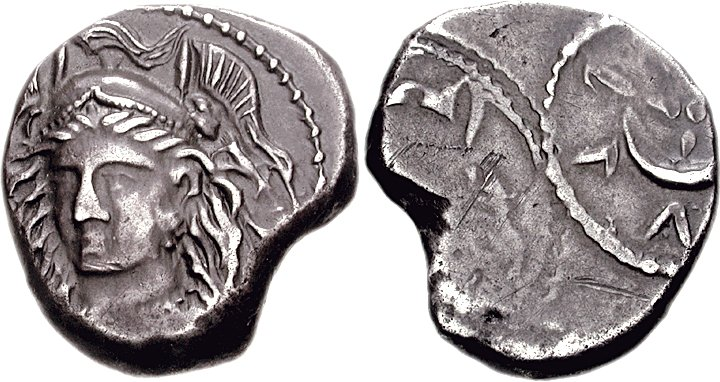
First side of the image: Head of Menrva facing slightly left, wearing triple-crested Attic helmet
Second side of the image: ‘pupluna’ in Etruscan alphabet, star of four rays within crescent
8.39 g, 3rd century BC.

The earliest struck silver coinage seems to be that of Vulci and Populonia. An attribution to the 5th century for these first issues of tridrachms, didrachms, or staters and drachms is plausible since they seem to be struck on the 'Chalcidian' silver drachm standard of theoretically about 5.8 grams, which were present at Etruria's nearest Greek neighbor, i.e. Cumae, dated to about 475-470 BC and at other Greek cities important to Etruscan sea-borne commerce in the early 5th century, such as Himera, Naxos and Zancle. The coins are of Greek style, but with an Etruscan flavor and have a predilection for 'apotropaic' images of exotic animals and monsters that drive away evil demons. The wheels with curved struts of Vulci are also reminiscent of some 5th century Macedonian tribal coins. These early issues are rare and seem not to have been exported; they have no mark of value and must have had a limited circulation.

An issue of silver didrachms with a crudely engraved male head issued on a similar 'Chalcidian' weight standard to the undenominated coins of Vulci and Populonia, but bearing the mark of value 5, has been tentatively attributed to Luca during the last quarter of the 4th century or later. They correspond to a single silver unit of about 2.25 grams, probably representing the silver equivalent of a bronze as or libra, derived from the Greek litra. These male heads were probably followed by a more finely produced octopus/amphora silver series, also struck on the 'Chalcidian' standard, but with exactly double the unit of value of the former. The marks of value 20, 10 and 5, give a silver unit or as of about 1.13 grams, approximately one Roman scruple, and probably represent a devaluation of the bronze unit in relation to silver.

Populonia may have been the first Etruscan city to place a mark of value on its coinage, following a practice already established by the mid-5th century at Syracuse and other Sicilian mints for silver uncial fractions of the litra, and at Akragas, the silver 5-litrae denominated ΠΕΝ for pentalitron and I for litra. The first Metus series has been dated to the second half of the 5th century by excavations at Prestino, via Isonzo, a chronology confirmed by the subsequent find of a rare 5-unit piece of the same series in the excavation of the early 4th century Etruscan sanctuary at Golasecca, from the phase III A 2 stratum. The weight standard employed seems to be the Corinthian stater (or Attic didrachm) with a theoretical weight of about 8.6 grams, subdivided into 10, 5 and 2 1/2 units that seem to be on the Sicilian silver litrae standard of 0.86 grams. An issue of staters on the 'Corinthian' standard attested at Cumae, Etruria's nearest Greek neighbour, dated to about 470-455 BC, may have provided the metrological model for this issue, which was denominated with Etruscan numeral X (=10); associated fractions are, V (= 5) and II< (=2 1/2).

The second Metus silver series of Populonia, massive by Etruscan standards, with the mark of value 20, 10 and 5 units, is on the same metrological standard as the Hercle and Menvra 20-units, male and female head 10, and male head 5, 2 1/5 and 1 unit and by metrological association, are related to the Metus, lion head, male and female headed 50 to 10 unit gold issues. Find evidence from the Ponte Gini di Orentino excavation suggests a dating for this whole phase in the first half of the 3rd century and may be connected with the First Punic War. The metrology of this phase, with marks of value exactly double those of the first Metus issue, may correspond to the elusive 'Italian school' introduction of the denarius proposed by Pliny to 269 BC, as it is exactly on the same standard and anticipates the Roman denarius and multiple-as systems introduced during the Second Punic War in about 212/211.

An issue depicting a hippocamp with marks of value CC and C, tentatively attributed to Lucca, is on the same weight standard as the Populonia's second Metus series (20, 10 and 5 units), but the 10 units is expressed by two numerals of five (CC).

=== Gold ===
Pupluna - XXV asses.
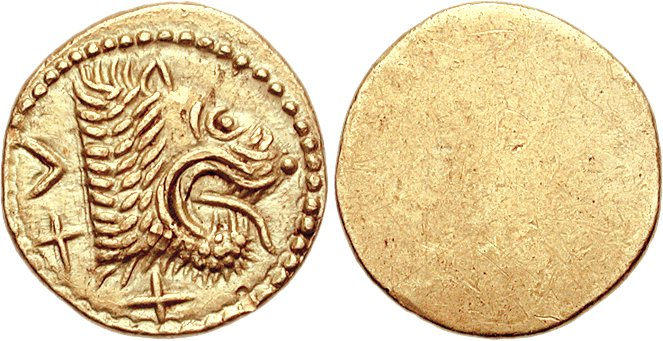
First side of the image: Lion's head right; X-XV (mark of value) below and behind
Second side of the image: Blank.
AV 1,40 g, period of 3rd century BC.

A spectacular gold series of high artistic merit probably from Volsini has marks of value 20 and 5. The unique Apollo-like head/majestic bull walking 20-unit piece is reminiscent of the bronze issues of the Latin colonies of Aesernia, Cales, Compultaria, Suessa Aurunca and Teanum in Campania dated to the mid-3rd century BC. The reverse running dog 5-unit coin is reminiscent of the Chiana Valley male head/dog running struck bronze of uncertain date in the 3rd century. This is an isolated series with a gold unit of approximately 0.225 grams, which places it before the main gold issue of Populonia with a gold unit of 0.056 grams issued in the earlier part of the 3rd century, and possibly related to the intervention of Rome at the time of the slave rebellion at Volsini in 265/4.

== Mints ==
=== Cosa Volcentium ===
Cosa - AE
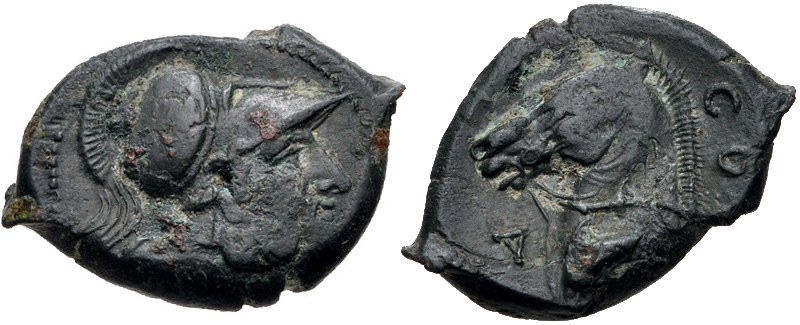
First side of the image: Helmeted head of mars, right
Second side of the image: Head of horse, left
Etruria, Cosa: AE (19mm, 4.23g)

Previously attributed to Compsa in Samnium, two types attributed to Cosa exist: a bronze ½ litra with the head of either Mars or Coza on the obverse, and the head of a horse on the reverse. They are similar in fabric to a Roman coin with the head of Minerva. Buttery uses the establishment of a Roman colony in Cosa in 273 BCE as grounds for a terminus post quem at this date.

Eckhel originally misattributed the Koson stater to Cosa, but the attribution was later confirmed to be a site in Transylvania based on hoard evidence.

=== Populonia ===
The majority of coins produced in all of Etruria were silver issues minted in Populonia. Minting of these coins began in the 5th century BCE, in a Greek style but with Etruscan artistic influence. Starting in the 3rd century BCE, bronze and gold coins were also minted; gold coins date to the beginning of the 3rd century BCE in connection with major political and military events, while bronze coins date to the end of the 3rd century BCE.

Coinage with value marks first appeared around 425 BCE, with gold coins in denominations of 50, 25, 12.5, 10, and silver coins in denominations of 20, 10, 5, 2.5, and 1. In the 3rd century BCE, bronze coinage was struck with denominations marked in unciae.

Populonian Value Marks
Inscription	Value
I	1
<II	2
Λ	5
X	10
>IIX	12½
ΛXX	25
XX	20
XXX	30
↑	50
>I<	100

=== Uncertain/Misattribution ===
==== Arretium ====
E.S.G. Robinson confidently attributed a struck bronze type from ca. 208-207 BC with the head of an African man on the obverse and an elephant on the reverse to Arretium or the slightly broader Val di Chiana.

==== Pisae ====
Only one series of coins, first published by Bompois(?), featuring a uniface design with an octopus (with a varying amount of tentacles), was first assigned to Pisae by Garrucci based on anecdotal linguistic evidence. While Vecchi originally confirmed this attribution, it appears that he reassigned it to Populonia during his time consulting the now-defunct Roma Numismatics.

== See also ==
- History of coins in Italy
- Coinage of Populonia
- Media related to Etruscan coins at Wikimedia Commons
