= Vittorio Giorgini =

Italian architect (1926–2010)

- Born: 9 May 1926; Florence, Kingdom of Italy
- Died: 19 February 2010 (aged 83); Florence, Italy
- Occupation: Architect

Vittorio Giorgini (9 May 1926 – 19 February 2010) was an Italian architect known for his experimental approach to architecture, particularly his research into the relationship between natural forms, biological systems and architectural design.

== Life and career ==
Born in Florence, Giorgini graduated from the University of Florence in 1957 and started working with architects including Leonardo Savioli, Ludovico Quaroni and Edoardo Detti.

Giorgini became internationally known for Casa Saldarini (1962), a biomorphic house built at Baratti near Piombino. The experimental structure, based on membrane-like forms inspired by natural systems, became one of the most notable examples of organic and visionary architecture in post-war Italy. Among his other works are the Baratti house known as the "Hexagon" (1957) and a middle school in Bibbona (1965–1966).

In 1969 he moved to the United States, where he taught at the Pratt Institute School of Architecture in New York. His architectural research focused on morphology, studying natural structures as models for architectural and design solutions. In the United States, Giorgini designed several visionary projects, including the Interstate Highway Oasis Prototype (1973), Roosevelt Island Housing Project (1976), Biscayne Bay (1976), South Street Seaport Center (1978), Walking Tall (1982), Genesis (1984), and River Crane (1993).

Giorgini died in Florence on 19 February 2010, aged 83.

== Bibliography ==
- Del Francia, Marco (2000). Vittorio Giorgini. La natura come modello. Florence: Angelo Pontecorboli.
- Monaci, Elisa (2024). Toscanità. Le architetture di Vittorio Giorgini. Sylva. Milan: Mimesis. ISBN 9791222309453.
- Wolf, Agnes (2007). "Vittorio Giorgini". Allgemeines Künstlerlexikon. Die Bildenden Künstler aller Zeiten und Völker. Vol. 54. Berlin: De Gruyter. pp. 443–444.
