= Coinage of Populonia =

Coins of Ancient Populonia

PUPLUNA

Coinage of Populonia consists of the coins minted by the city of Populonia and issued from the mid-5th century B.C. until the mid-3rd century B.C., when the city lost its autonomy.

The issues of this community fit into the mainstream of Etruscan coinage and constitute one of its main contributions. The coinage of Populonia, like other Etruscan coinage, is included, for traditional reasons, among the Greek coins.

First series: 10 units
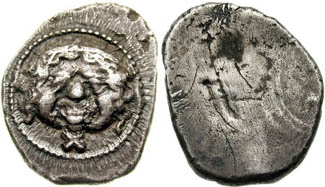
First side of the image: Gorgon; below X, indication of value.
Second side of the image: Plain.
AR, 8,19 g; HN Italy 117

== Historical context ==
First series: 2 ½ units
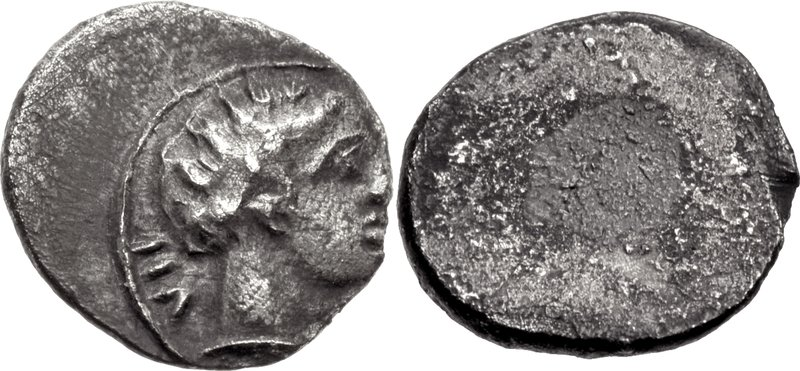
First side of the image: Male head; II, indication of value, behind.
Second side of the image: Plain.
AR 0,99 g; HN Italy 175
First series: 5 units
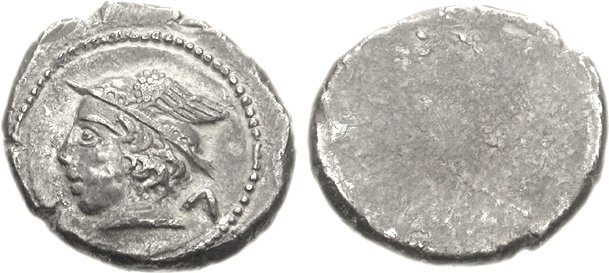
First side of the image: Head of Mercury (Turms) left, with winged petasus; right Λ, value sign.
Second side of the image: Plain.
AR 3,30 g; HN Italy 123
Second series: 50 units
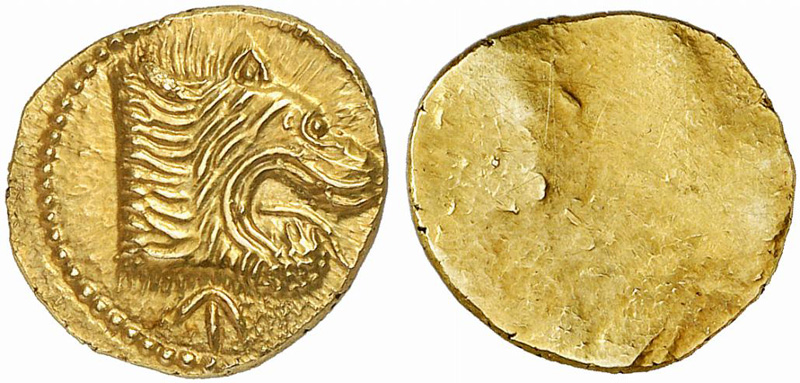
First side of the image: Lion head to the right; below ￪, indication of value.
Second side of the image: Plain.
AV 2,75 g; HN Italy 127
Second series: 25 units
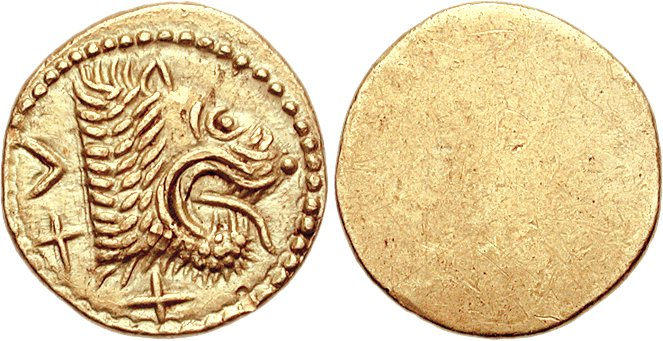
First side of the image: Lion head to the right; below and in front X - XV, indication of value.
Second side of the image: Plain.
AV 1,40 g; HN Italy 128
Second series: 10 units
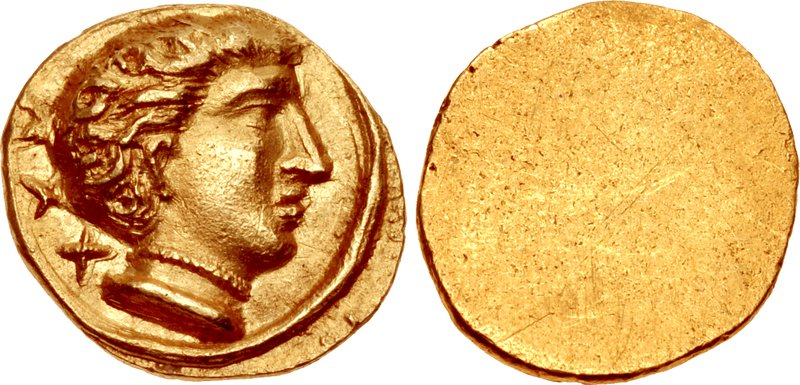
First side of the image: Young male head to the right, wearing pearl necklace; behind XXΛ (value).
Second side of the image: Plain.
AV 11 mm, 1,33 g; HN Italy 132
Second series: 10 units
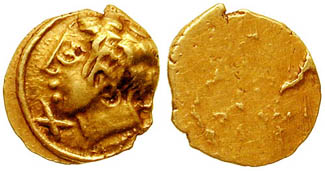
First side of the image: Human head to the left; X under chin.
Second side of the image: Plain.
AV 0,54 g; HN Italy 134.
Second series: 10 units
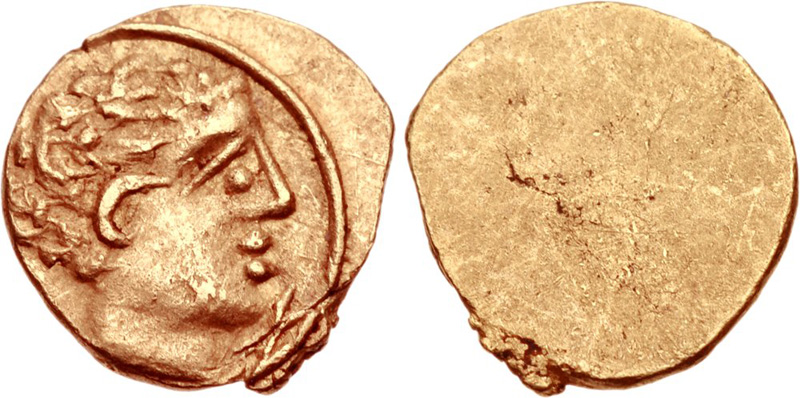
First side of the image: Human head to the ritght; X under chin.
Second side of the image: Plain.
AV 8 mm, 0,54 g; HN Italy 135.
Second series: 10 units
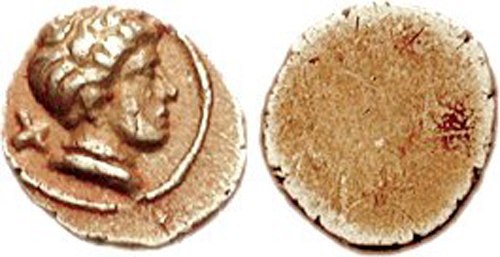
First side of the image: Human head to the right with torc; X behind the nape of the neck.
Second side of the image: Plain.
AV 0,58 g; HN Italy 136
Second series: 20 units silver
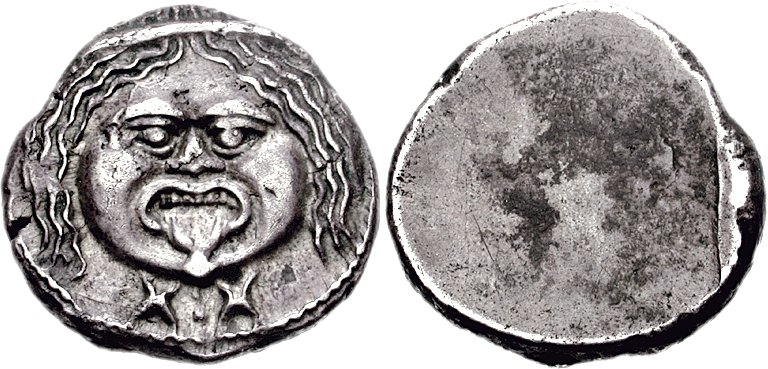
First side of the image: Gorgon in front, below X : X.
Second side of the image: Plain.
AR 8,30 g; HN Italy 152
Second series: 20 units silver
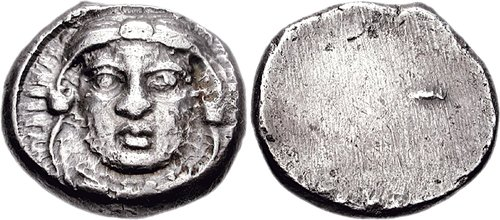
First side of the image: Head of young Hercules looking forward, with lion's skin; [X X on sides of neck].
Second side of the image: Plain.
AR 9,03 g; HN Italy 155

Populonia was an ancient city in Etruria. The remains are now in the municipality of Piombino. It was one of the twelve Etruscan lucumones and along with Volterra was one of the major mining and metallurgical centers of the Etruscans.

According to Pliny and Strabo, reported by Giuseppe Micali, Populonia would have been a colony founded by the Volterrani.

== Numismatic context ==
The coins of Populonia fall fully as features within the scope of Etruscan coinage: indication of value, a single minted face, etc.

The silver coinage of Populonia constitutes the largest group of Etruscan coins.

== Coinage ==
Three phases can be identified based on weight: in the first, the X-value has an average weight of about 8.4 g, in the second 4.2 g, and in the third 2.1 g.

There are gold coins that are to be associated with those of the second phase, maintaining a gold to silver ratio of 1:7½.

The coins bear the value indications expressed in the same way as the Roman coins. However, this coinage predates the Roman coinage by several centuries.

In addition to these coins, there are others from the Populonia area that can be identified by weight as tridrachms (c.16.5 g), didrachms (c. 10.5 g) and drachms (5.5 g) as well as some fractions.

== 5th century ==
To this group belong coins without value indication and without legend, whose attribution to Populonia is nevertheless credited by several authors.

=== Tridrachm ===
The two coins, valued as euboic foot tetradrachms by Sambon (1903), are thought to be tridrachms by Rutter et al. (2001).

Uniface silver coin. On obverse a lion, facing left, its tail with snake head turned backward. The weight is 16.3 to 16.7 g. Specimens of the coin can be found in the BM collections and SNG France.

Uniface silver coin. The present type depicts a boar passing to the right on a stone ground. The weight reported in HN Italy varies between 15.7 and 16.7 g.

=== Didrachm ===
Protome of lion ending in a snake, facing backward. Two variants exist: with the lion facing left or right. The weight varies between 10 and 11 g.

=== Drachm and fractions ===
Protome of lion, with open mouth and tongue sticking out; mane straight. In Rutter et al. three groups are identified by weight, which are then classified as drachma, tetrobolus and diobolus; weights are 5.5, about 3.7 and 2.6 to 1.2 grams, respectively.

== First series of the gorgons ==
This period is dated to around the end of the fifth century BCE and the beginning of the next. Four different types of obverse are present in this phase: Gorgon head, juvenile male head, head of Mercury or Turms, wheel.

Each of these types is depicted on several values. The wheel is known, with two variants, only on the unit. The coins are all silver, contain the value indication, and, with one exception, the reverse is plain.

The average weight of the reference coin, the one with a value of 10 units, is about 8.4 grams.

=== 10 units ===
Gorgon head facing forward; X below, sometimes between two dolphins. Weight is between 5.5 and 9 grams.

=== 5 units ===
Gorgon head facing forward; Λ below. Weight is between 3.4 and 4.5 g.

Juvenile male head turned right; on left Λ. Weight is between 3.4 and 4.5 g.

=== 2 ½ units ===
Gorgon head facing forward; II below. Weight is between 1.8 and 2.1 g.

Juvenile male head turned right; IIV on left. Weight is about 1.9 g.

=== Unit ===
Juvenile male head turned right; I on left. Weight is between 0.7 and 0.95 g.

Wheel; in a variant, I on the reverse. Weight is between 0.73 and 0.85 g. It is the only coin of this phase with a non-smooth reverse.

== Gold and second series of the gorgons ==
=== Gold ===
In Historia Numorum Italy the gold series is temporally associated with silver coins in which the X-unit coin has a weight of about 4.2 g. This association is set keeping in mind a ratio of gold to silver of 1:7½.

The known values are those of 50, 25, 12½ and 10 units, marked with the symbols ￪, ΛΧΧ, ΧΙΙΛ, Χ, respectively.

The weights for the 50-unit coins vary between 2.7 and 2.9 g; for the 25 between 1.2 and 1.7 g; for the 12½ between 0.6 and 0.8 g; and for the 10 between 0.5 and 0.76 g.

The coins have an effigy only on the obverse, while the reverse is always plain.

The effigy types are:

Lion head and value sign: 50, 25, 12½ and 10.

Female head with necklace and value sign: 50, 25.

Male head with necklace and value sign: 25, 10. This value has three variants.

Hippocampus and value sign: 50, 12½.

Gorgoneid and value sign: 50.

Owl and value sign: 10.

Seal and value sign: 10.

=== Silver ===
==== Gorgons ====
The coins, which feature the gorgon type on the obverse, are minted in three values marked as 20, 10 and 5 units. Various types are represented on the reverse, and some are plain.

Weight in grams
value	min	max
20	6,5	9,1 g
10	3,4	3,8
5	1,8	2,1

===== 20 units =====
Gorgon head obverse; XX written in different spellings. On the reverse 11 variants: letters; star, crescent and pupluna; star, crescent and puplana (sic!) between two stars; trident, crescent and puplana (sic!) between two stars; octopus, two octopus, octopus and trident; club, two caduceus, motif with X; reverse smooth.

===== 10 units =====
Head of gorgon facing front; X. Smooth reverse.

===== 5 units =====
Head of gorgon, obverse; below Λ. Reverse trident and dolphins.

==== Other deities ====
Weight in grams
value	min	max
20	6,7	9,1 g
5	1,2	2,3
2½	0,7	1,1

===== 20 units =====
Juvenile head of Hercle (the Etruscan Hercules) facing forward or slightly rotated; below X X. Reverse smooth or club.

Head of Menrva (the Etruscan Minerva) three-quarter length; beneath X X. Reverse with three variants: smooth; star, crescent and pupluna; star, crescent and mi:pupluna:les:.

Bearded head of Fufluns (the Etruscan Bacchus) three-quarter length, with ivy wreath; above X X. Reverse either plain or with thunderbolt.

===== 5 units =====
Head of Turms (the Etruscan Mercury) right or left;behind >. The reverse has three variants: one with crescent and the legend miz[- - -], another has a star, below a crescent and above [pupl]una, and the third has a smooth reverse.

===== 2½ units =====
Head of Turms right or left, IIV. The reverse is smooth.

===== Other kinds =====
Weight in grams
value	min	max
10	2,3	4,8 g
5	1,4	2,4
2½	0,6	1,2
1	0,3	0,5

There are other types that for values of 10, 5, 2½, and 1 unit. Male and female heads are depicted, variously represented: vaulted right, left, with or without beards.

====== 10 units ======
Female head with diadem looking to the right, behind X, forward, sometimes, star. Reverse smooth, with an octopus or wheel.

Male head right or left, laureate, sometimes with necklace; behind X. This type is also interpreted as a depiction of Apulu, the Etruscan deity corresponding to Apollo. Plain reverse.

====== 5 units ======
Male head right, laureate, sometimes with necklace; behind Λ. There are three types of reverse: smooth; with trident and crescent and traces of letters; octopus and traces of letters. Another variant, with the head turned to the left, has a smooth reverse.

Male head right, bearded, laureate or with hair secured with a band; behind Λ. Smooth reverse.

====== 2 ½ units ======
Male head right or left; in field IIU

Female head right or left; in field IIU

====== 1 unit ======
Male head right or left; in field I

Wheel

===== Bronze =====
====== Æ trient ======
Head of Menrva facing right with Corinthian helmet; below four globules

Reverse owl and four globules. Sometimes in retrograde Etruscan alphabet: PUPLUNA

====== Æ quadrant ======
as the previous but with three globules instead of four

====== Æ sextant ======
as the previous one but with two globules instead of three

Head of diademed Hercle with club on shoulder / Bow and arrows. Claw. Two globules.

Head of Sethlans (the Etruscan Vulcan) with pileus; left rostrum between two globules / Hammer and tongs two globules PUFLUNA - VETALU.

====== Æ trient ======
Turms head, four globes / two caduceus, crescent, four globes and legend

====== Æ sextant ======
as the previous one but with two globules

This coin is often found rebated above the sextant with Menvra (HN Italy 186)

== Third series ==
This third series features four silver coins and one bronze trient. The silver coins are of 10, 5, and 2 1/2 units. In the 10-unit coin, the weight of the known specimens varies between 2.15 and 3.3 g; the 5-unit ones between 0.9 and 1.2 g, while the 2 1/5-unit one weighs 0.9. This coin could also belong to the second series.

=== Silver ===
==== 10 units ====
Laureate male head facing right; value indication is X; reverse is smooth.

==== 5 units ====
Lion's head to left. Above < ; reverse is smooth.

Turms head left or right. Back ^ ; reverse is smooth.

==== 2½ units ====
Dolphin to left; below II C; reverse is smooth.

=== Bronze ===
==== Trient ====
Head of Sethlans to the right; on the head a laureate pileus; to the right X; on the reverse hammer with tongs and four globules. The legend is PUPLUNA.

== Fourth series ==
This series features two coins, both silver, of 10 and 5 units.

=== 10 units ===
Male head on right; on left X; on reverse lightning bolt (?).

=== 5 units ===
Male head, sometimes with beard; on left Λ. Reverse uncertain.

These coins are significantly lower in weight than earlier issues.

== Findings ==
=== IGCH 1954 ===
Treasure found at Cecina, presumably buried c. 300 BCE and consisting of 5 gold and 84 silver coins distributed as follows: 4 obols from Massalia, 5 “quinarii” from Populonia (Sambon 82? = HN Italy 171?), 4 unattributable AR and 5 undescribed AV. The contents are listed in Gamurrini, p. 68, note 1.

=== IGCH 2042 ===
Treasure found in Val d'Orcia in 1930, presumably buried in the 3rd century B.C., containing over 133 silver coins of which 131 are from Populonia. These are catalogued as follows: 111 pieces Sambon 42ff; 20 pieces Sambon 61ff; 2 drachms Sambon 73.

=== IGCH 2041 ===
This treasure was found in Sovana in 1885, presumably buried in the 3rd century B.C. It consists of 116 silver coins, all from Populonia: part didrachms (Sambon 41, 48, 50, 54-5, 58, 60-4, 67) and part drachms (Sambon 68, 73). The treasury is described by Garucci, part II, p. 184 and by Bianchi Bandinelli (1932).

== Photographs ==
- AE Mnerva - dolphin
- Hercules club
- AE triente mnerva - civet
- sextant (Hercules - bow/quiver)

== See also ==
- Populonia
- Etruscan coins
- Etruscan civilization

== Bibliography ==
- Convegni del Centro Internazionale di Studi Numismatici di Napoli: Contributi introduttivi allo studio della monetazione etrusca. Atti del V Convegno, Napoli 1975 [Conferences of the Naples International Center for Numismatic Studies: Introductory Contributions to the Study of Etruscan Coinage. Proceedings of the Fifth Conference, Naples 1975]. Rome: Istituto italiano di numismatica. 1977.
- Campana, Alberto. "Corpus Nummorum Italiæ Antiquæ". Panorama Numismatico.
- Catalli, Fiorenzo (1998). Monete Etrusche [Etruscan Coins] (in Italian). IPZS.
- Catalli, Fiorenzo (1995). Monete dell'Italia antica [Coins of ancient Italy] (in Italian). IPZS. ISBN 88-240-3977-4.
- Ciampi, Sebastiano (1813). Lettera di Sebastiano Ciampi sopra tre medaglie etrusche in argento [Letter from Sebastiano Ciampi regarding three Etruscan silver medals] (in Italian). Pisa.
- Cristofani, Mauro (1989). Istituto Italiano di Numismatica (ed.). La monetazione etrusca dieci anni dopo il convegno di Napoli [Etruscan coinage ten years after the Naples conference] (in Italian). Atti dell'Istituto italiano di Numismatica [Proceedings of the Italian Institute of Numismatics]. Rome: Istituto Italiano di Numismatica.
- Gamurrini, Gian Francesco (1874). "Le monete etrusche d'oro e principalmente di Populonia" [Etruscan gold coins mainly from Populonia]. Periodico di Numismatica e Sfragistica per la storia d'Italia (in Italian). V: 48–80.
- Garrucci, Raffaele (1967) [1885]. Le monete dell'Italia antica, Raccolta generale [Coins of Ancient Italy, General Collection] (in Italian). Rome: Forni. ISBN 978-88-271-0110-0.
- Micali, Giuseppe (1836). Storia degli antichi popoli italiani [History of the ancient Italian peoples] (in Italian). Rome.
- N. Rutter, Keith; et al. (et al.) (2001). Historia Nummorum - Italy. London: British Museum Press. ISBN 0-7141-1801-X.
- Sambon, Arthur (1903). Les Monnaies antiques d'Italie [Ancient coins from Italy] (in French). Paris: Bureaux du "Musée".
- R. Sear, David (1980). Greek coins and their values. Vol. 1 (3rd ed.). London: Sanford J Durst. ISBN 0-900652-46-2.
- Vecchi, Italo (2012). Etruscan Coinage. Part I. A corpus of the coinage of the Rasna, together with an historical and economic commentary on the issues (gold, silver and bronze) from the mints of Cosa, Luca (?), Pisae (?), Populonia, Uncertain Central Italy, Vetulonia, Volsinii (?), Vulci (?) and unidentified mints, from 5th to 3rd centuries BC. Milan: Ennerre. ISBN 978-88-87235-76-0.
- Vicari. "Materiali e considerazioni per uno studio organico della monetazione etrusca" [Materials and considerations for an organic study of Etruscan coinage]. Rivista italiana di numismatica (in Italian) (1991). Milan.
- Vincent Head, Barclay (1911). Historia Numorum: a Manual of Greek Numismatics (2nd ed.). London: Oxford.
- Thompson, Margaret; Mørkholm, Otto; M. Kraay, Colin, eds. (1973). An Inventory of Greek Coin Hoards (IGCH). New York: ANS. ISBN 978-0-89722-068-2.
- Parente, Anna Rita, ed. (2003). SNG France, Vol. 6, Part 1: Italie (Étrurie-Calabre) [SNG France, Vol. 6, Part 1: Italy (Etruria-Calabria)] (in French). Paris: Bibliothèque Nationale de France / Numismatica Ars Classica. ISBN 2-7177-2232-7.
- Schwabacher, Willy; Breitenstin, Niels, eds. (1981). SNG Copenhagen, Vol. One: Italy, Sicily. Copenhagen: Danish National Museum.
