= Populonia =

- Frazione
- Archaeological Park

- Location of Populonia in Italy
- Coordinates: 42°59′22″N 10°29′29″E
- Country: Italy
- Region: Tuscany
- Province: Livorno
- Comune: Piombino
- Elevation: 170 m (560 ft)

Population (2009)
  - Total: 17
- Time zone: UTC+1 (CET)
  - Summer (DST): UTC+2 (CEST)
- Postal code: 57020
- Dialing code: 0565

Populonia or Populonia Alta (Etruscan: Pupluna, Pufluna or Fufluna) is a small village and frazione of the comune of Piombino (Tuscany) situated on the west coast of Italy.

Populonia is noteworthy for its Etruscan remains which include one of the main necropoles in Italy, extending over a large surrounding area much of which is now within the Baratti and Populonia Archeological Park.

Its history is closely linked to the exploitation of the mineral resources of the Metalliferous Hills and the nearby island of Elba which made it the iron-working centre of Etruria.

The Archaeological Museum of Populonia in Piombino contains finds from the ancient territory of Populonia.

== Description ==
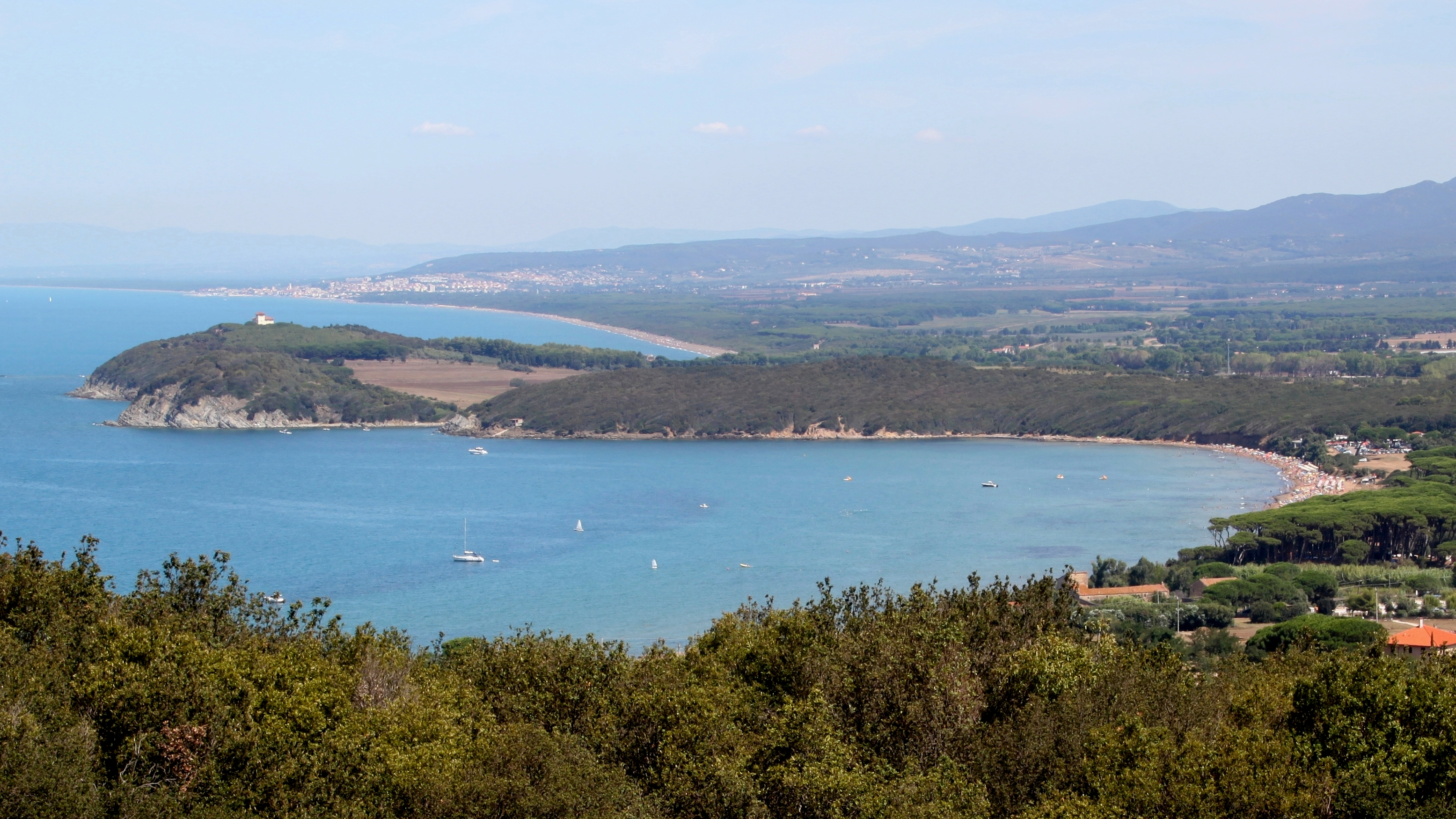
Gulf of Baratti

The hamlet of modern Populonia is located within a small part of the walled acropolis of the ancient city which covered the entire north end of Monte Massoncello promontory and extended down to the Bay of Baratti, on the shore of which was its port.

The city's wealth was derived from smelting several metal ores from the inland Colline Metallifere (the "metal-bearing hills") and later from iron ore mined on nearby Elba. Over the thousand years of the city's life, enormous quantities of waste slag from smelters was deposited and eventually covered the slopes and shore of the bay of Baratti burying abandoned buildings and cemeteries up to 10m deep until the ore ran out, when the city was abandoned and knowledge of most of the site was eventually lost.

Starting from the 1920s the still iron-rich slag was removed and reworked for its valuable content which led to rediscovery of the Etruscan necropoleis and other buildings, attracting the attention of the archaeologists. Soon it was realised that not only Populonia but the entire Val di Cornia (Valley of the nearby Cornia River) had been densely populated in Etruscan times. They uncovered the Villanovan, Orientalising, and archaic necropolises of Porcareccia, San Cerbone, Casone, and Poggio and Piano delle Granate. The work was hasty and the oldest tombs sought, and many late Classical and Hellenistic-Roman burials in the surface layers were destroyed.

Since 1998 the site has been the subject of a coordinated programme of excavations, the results of which are published in the Materiali per Populonia series. Research continues, most recently with the 2023-2025 excavations on the acropolis.

In recognition of the area's importance to archaeology, a system of parks was created, the Parchi della Val di Cornia, with a key park being the Parco archeologico di Baratti e Populonia, the "Baratti and Populonia Archeological Park", which covers the hill with the acropolis and the entire Bay of Baratti and its shores. Another is the Archaeological Area of Poggio del Molino.

== Name ==
The name of the Etruscan city of Fufluna is known from its coins. It has been suggested that it was named after a god, Fufluns, as other Etruscan cities were named after divinities. It would mean, then, "the city of Fufluns." The word was written in Hellenistic times with the Etruscan letter f, only introduced then. Before then Etruscans and Romans made do with a p, resulting in such spellings as Pupluna or Populonia, but the pronunciation must have been Fufluna.

== History ==
=== Proto-historic foundation myths ===
A number of stories about the foundation of Populonia promulgated by the classical authors writing several hundred years later have been found to have no basis in archaeology. Maurus Servius Honoratus in his commentary on Vergil's Aeneid says that Populonia was founded later than the other cities by Corsicans, who were driven out by Etruscans from Volterra or by Volterraneans without the Corsican interlude. However, Populonia is Villanovan in provenance and no material remains of any Corsicans have been found or excavated, the tombs are unlike those of Volterra, and Populonia was by far the major settlement.

Strabo claimed that Populonia was the only Etruscan coastal city; the others were removed from the coast by several miles. He may not have known that Pisa had been a major Etruscan city before it was Roman. Spina also had been placed at the edge of the Po River and has been termed the Etruscan Venice. Also the minor settlements of Pyrgi and Gravisca were early Etruscan ports. By Strabo's time, the Romans had seized the entire coastline and had ejected the Etruscans from it.

=== Foundation ===
Acropolis of Populonia - Seen from the castle

The summit of Poggio del Telegrafo on the acropolis was densely inhabited from the start of the Iron Age, as shown by excavations, with huts of different structure and size of the same date as the Villanovan cemeteries, about 900 BC. The site combined two advantages: as a coastal promontory it was easy to defend and embraced views of the coast and Elba. The inhabitants moved here after numerous nearby coastal villages of the final Bronze Age were abandoned.

The earliest evidence of Etruscans at Fufluna is from two necropoleis, San Cerbone on the south shore of the Bay of Baratti and Piano e Poggio della Granate further north on the bay, containing material of the Villanovan culture, which began about 900 BC. Except for some cities that probably began in the Proto-Villanovan, 900 is the foundation time for the majority of Etruscan urbanisations. The presence of the cemeteries can only be explained by a large settlement nearby, which can only have been Fufluna. The Villanovan burials are predominantly incineration in the earliest phase, with the ashes collected in a biconical impasto vase covered by a bowl and accompanied by bronze grave goods (one or more fibulae, ornamental objects or utensils); alongside these (as in Caere) are inhumations in a pit.

In the most ancient period the grave goods do not reveal marked differences in rank, but two or three generations later the formation of the aristocracy begins, continuing in the 8th c. BC and into the Orientalizing period.

=== The Orientalising period ===
Bronze fan from the Tomb of the Flabelli, 700-550 BC Museo archeologico nazionale di Firenze

Gold jewellery from the Tomb of the Goldsmiths, 650-600 BC (Museo archeologico del territorio di Populonia)

From the second half of the 9th century BC, before the rest of Etruria, the large monumental tumuli with a pseudo-dome roof and cylindrical base (crepidines) were built. The wealth of their grave goods indicate their use by a class whose wealth derived from the exploitation of the inland mines and perhaps already of Elba. These included proto-Corinthian, Corinthian, Greek-Oriental, Phoenician, Vetulonian and Caeretan imports, alongside local products such as the characteristic flabelli (fans) and bronze chariots, some with iron inlays which indicate their wealth. The contents are a sign of the existence of well-structured families or clans and intent on underlining their rank in burial. Among the largest, the Tomb of the Flabelli stands out as one of the richest in northern Etruria.

From the second half of the 7th century and in the first decades of the 6th the tumuli lost monumentality: the crepidines became lower, the dimensions more uniform, the alignments regular, traits in which it is possible to read a reorganisation of the community in an egalitarian sense. In the 6th century the necropolis of Poggio and Piano delle Granate ceased to be used and new tomb types emerged, the aedicule tombs with double-pitched roofs and antefixes and the sarcophagi made of bench slabs, while the Etruscan-Southern, Greco-Oriental and Greco-Continental imports continued, including Attic ceramics.

=== The Classical age ===
Bronze Situla from Populonia, 480-400 BC (Museo archeologico di Firenze)

Statuette of probably Tinia, 480 BC (Getty museum)

Around 600 BC, the city joined the Etruscan League or twelve cities. It served as one of the only two port cities.

After the Battle of Alalia (c. 540 BC) and the consequent "refounding" of Alalia, Populonia was able to establish a relationship with the Corsican centre, evidenced there by Greek and in particular Attic ceramic imports.

Also dating to the first decades of the 5th century are small bronzes of great quality from Populonia, including the Tinia of the Getty Museum and the Suicide Ajax (from the Tomb of the Funeral Beds, in the Florence museum), the work of northern Etruria with Greek-oriental origin.

In the 5th century the resources of Populonia and Elba were widely known leading Syracuse, already victorious against the Etruscans in the naval battle of Cumae (474 BC), to make two incursions against the island in 453 BC. The closure of the ports of the large cities of southern Etruria strengthened the role of Populonia as a port for the trade of minerals and metals as shown by Attic vases continuing to arrive in Populonia between the mid-5th and mid-4th century, while in the cities of southern Etruria imports decreased or stopped.

In this period Populonia became the great iron centre of Etruria, with the industrial district established around the inlet of Baratti.

In the 4th century the city experienced a notable population increase and became an obligatory stop on the commercial routes of the western Mediterranean, as indicated by the correspondence between the ceramics imported to Populonia and those found in other Mediterranean ports. The local metalworking industry produced vessels and utensils in bronze and, in a cheaper version, in lead with alloys and metals obtained from ores from the Campigliese area.

The Battle of Populonia was fought nearby in 282 BC. At this time, the Etruscans were fighting with the Boii Gauls in revolt against Rome. After the Roman victory, Etruscan military dominance of the region declined and offered little resistance to the Romans allowing for their eventual full conquest around 264 BC.

=== Hellenistic Age and Romanisation ===
After a lack of occupation on the acropolis from the middle of the 6th century BC, the hill was re-occupied between the end of the 4th and the first thirty years of the 3rd century BC, coinciding with the progressive Roman penetration into northern Etruria, and includes both new buildings on the summit terrace and the construction of the acropolis walls, dated to the first quarter of the 3rd century BC.

In 205 BC during the Second Punic War Populonia contributed iron to the outfitting of Scipio's Roman fleet. After the war the city underwent intense construction perhaps due to its loyalty to Rome: up to the first decades of the 1st century BC the saddle between the two hills was filled by a sacred area with three temples on a large polygonal terrace, connected to the summit of Poggio del Telegrafo by paved roads overlying a system of channels and cisterns. The oldest of the temples, temple B, built between the end of the 3rd and the beginning of the 2nd century BC is a canonical Tuscan temple with a tetrastyle front; Temple C is comparable with Umbrian-Latian examples and dates to the middle of the 2nd century.

The construction of a building close to the walls of the acropolis during the 2nd century BC, with a channnel against its exterior marked the obsolescence of the wall for defence.

In the second half of the 2nd century BC, a large domus with a Tuscan atrium, impluvium and tablinum was built along the western paved road, to which a balneum was added between the end of the 2nd and the beginning of the 1st century, and whose area of approximately 2000 m^{2} would make it one of the largest in Etruria. In the same period the eastern part of the public building known as the Logge was added, with an upper loggia decorated with mosaics and first style stuccoes dated to the last quarter of the 2nd century BC. On the roof tiles of the domus is the stamp Paapi, attributed to the gens of the Aemili Paapi, probably indicating the owner of the production site rather than that of the house but in any case suggesting investments by a member of the gens in the Populonian territory.

=== Roman Period ===
In the Social War (91–87 BC) the city sided with the Marian faction and was besieged by Sulla's army at the same time as Volterra, according to Strabo.

After the Social War with the granting of Roman citizenship, Populonia was registered in the Galeria tribe and became a municipium, as attested by two funerary inscriptions from the San Cerbone area. Pisa and Populonia were registered in the same Galeria tribe, despite being separated by a coastal strip belonging to Volterra registered in the Sabatina tribe, probably due to the policy of distribution of the Etruscan peoples among seven tribes, with the assignment to pairs of non-contiguous centres to prevent a tribe forming a compact electoral block.

Blind arch structure of the Logge of the acropolis

A final phase of urban renewal in the 1st century BC saw the blind arched substructure which enlarged the front of the Logge in perhaps the second quarter of the century, and the paving, or repaving, of the main street.

A rich aristocratic domus from the Roman-Republican era excavated in 2024 has revealed the story of Ledeltius, a slave who managed to regain his freedom. Finds include a black-painted ceramic inkwell inscribed with his name and indicating that he was a scribe and business manager for the owner, as well as styli for writing on wax tablets and a fragment of a ceramic doll that belonged to a little girl. The domus was destroyed by a fire around 50 BC, was abandoned in a hurry, leaving many contents in place. There was limited reuse after the fire perhaps in the Augustan age.

Strabo, writing at the beginning of the 1st century AD, saw the city almost deserted with the exception of the temples and a few houses while the port and the installations on the slopes of the promontory remained alive.

The harbour which lost its metallurgical business by the 2nd century AD continued to be of some importance. Nevertheless, several large villas were built nearby and other buildings along the nearby Via Aurelia. The suburbs near the port were abandoned at the end of the 3rd century.

=== Later History ===
In the 5th and 6th centuries the port area returned to use with less intense occupation, with the older buildings being reoccupied by small groups who built structures in perishable materials and buried their dead there, while the road was repaired and reused.

The place was an episcopal see in the 6th century. The city was destroyed in 570 by the Lombards. The few survivors, led by bishop St. Cerbo, fled to the island of Elba.

== The city ==
=== City walls ===
The walls of the acropolis on the tops of the Telegrafo and Castello hills were built in sandstone in the first quarter of the 3rd century BC, and had a perimeter of 2.4 km enclosing an area of about 20 hectares; in addition the so-called Low Walls protected the northern area of the promontory between the gulf of Baratti and Cala San Quirico and a third wall was along the watershed, called "bretella". The Low walls had at least three gates and were discovered from 1926 and largely destroyed by the removal of the ferrous waste; they were dated to the end of the 4th century BC. The walls of the acropolis also functioned as terracing, containing the erosion of the land and creating flat urban spaces.

=== The Etruscan-Roman acropolis ===
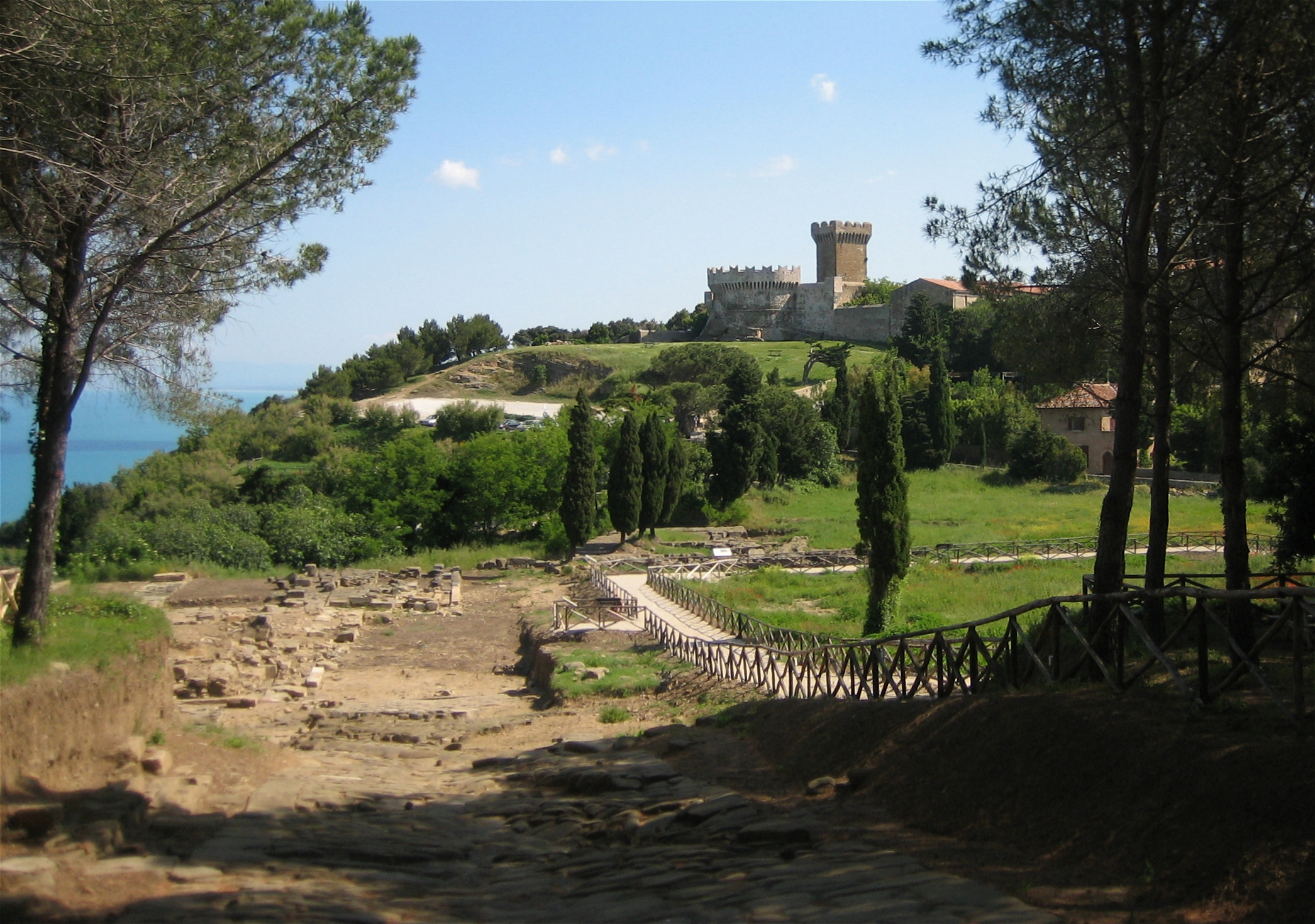
Populonia Acropolis

In its monumental phase between the end of the 3rd and the first decades of the 1st century BC, the acropolis was organised around two streets paved in sandstone and with sidewalks on benches, under which rainwater channels led to cisterns, including a large double-chamber public reservoir on the slopes of Poggio del Telegrafo. The three temples overlooked the square of the saddle; in a scenographic position on the slope stood the complex of the Logge, a public building on several terraces whose function is still debated, perhaps a sanctuary dedicated to Venus; along the streets there were houses and shops, in addition to the large domus.

=== The Necropoleis ===
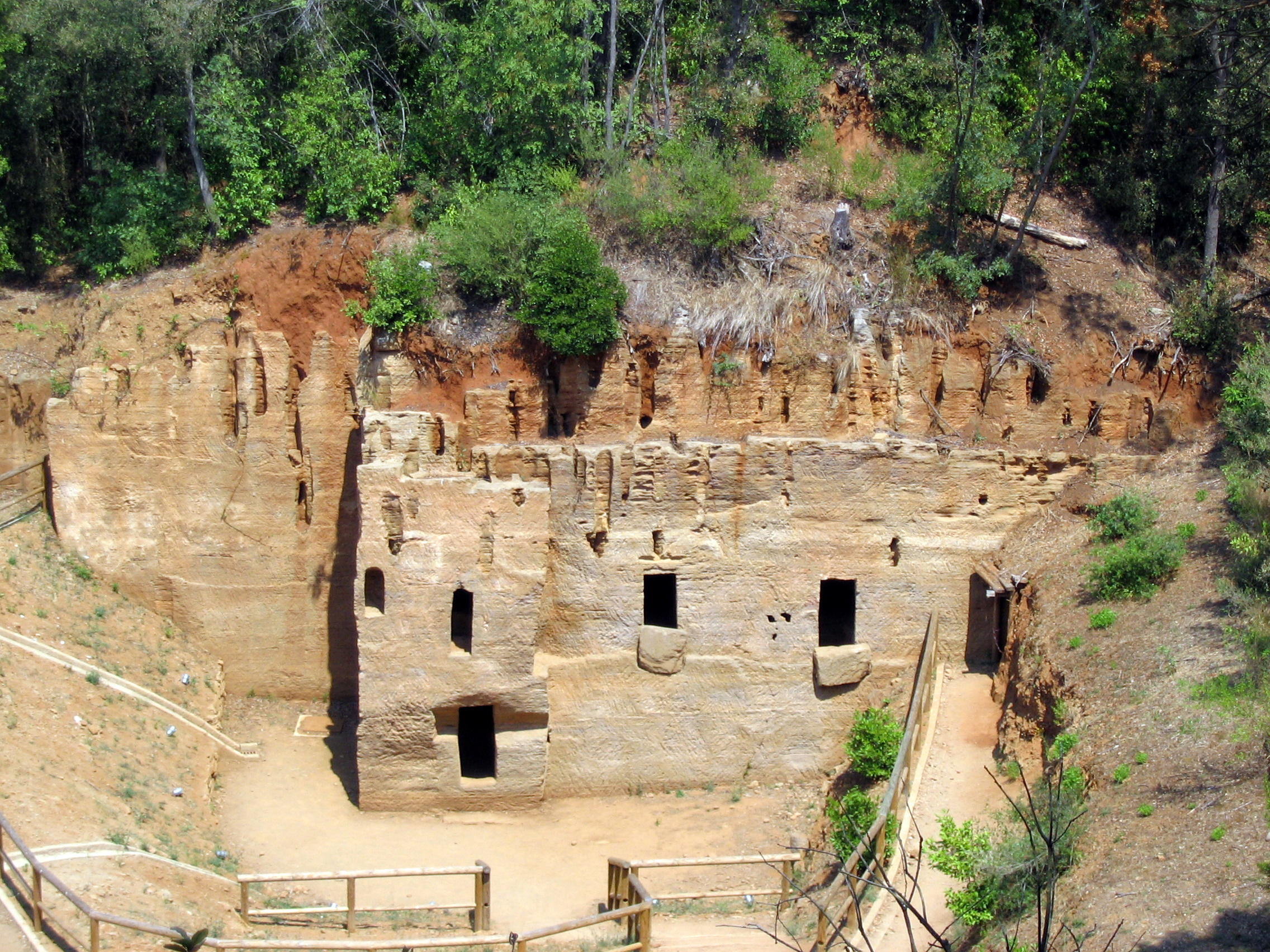
Necropolis "Necropoli delle grotte" (4th - 2nd century BC)

The necropoleis form one of the most important funerary complexes of the Etruscan civilisation. They are distributed in the gulf of Baratti and on the hills that surround it and include nuclei from the early Iron Age to the Hellenistic age. Unlike other Etruscan cities, the burial grounds do not surround the inhabited area but occupy spaces within.

Most of the contents of the tombs were robbed in antiquity but some which were soon buried deeply in slag retained valuable objects which have been recovered. The grave goods are conserved mainly in the museums of Piombino and Florence, where pieces recovered from the antiques market also arrived between the nineteenth and twentieth centuries; a collection is also in the museum of the Gasparri private collection in Populonia Alta.

=== Early Iron Age ===
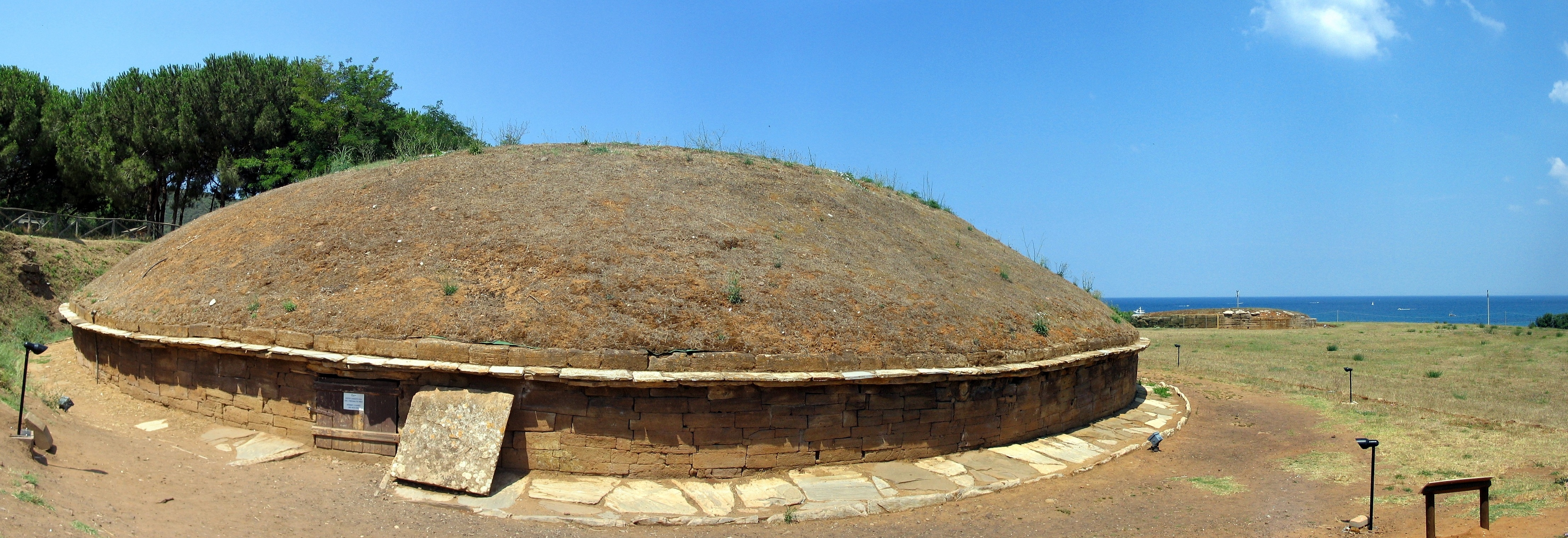
Tomb of the Chariots

Chariot with bronzes from the Biga tomb

Bronze detail of Biga chariot

The early Iron Age (9-8th century BC) burials show traits not found elsewhere in Etruria: inhumation was commonly practiced from the beginning alongside cremation; there are the oldest warrior burials in the region; burying several individuals together is unknown elsewhere in the Etruria.

Later tombs are in the necropolis of San Cerbone-Casone (and in the adjacent Poggio della Porcareccia). The "tumulus tombs" date to the 7th century BC (Orientalizing period) and are monumental tombs whose diameter ranges from 4 m in the oldest examples to 28 in the Tumulus of the Chariots. They are family tombs of the dominant aristocracy and the larger ones remained in use for several generations. The most common shape has a base (cylindrical drum or crepidine), usually in local sandstone (calcarenite), crowned by frames of protruding slabs and surrounded at the base by a sloping pavement for the drainage of water. The access dromos opens into the drum, with built walls and niches for secondary burials and grave goods; the burial chamber, in the centre of the tumulus, has a quadrangular plan and houses funeral beds, sometimes with moulded feet. The roof is a pseudo-dome, as in the most ancient chambers. In the second half of the century the tumuli became smaller and were executed with less care, seen as a reflection of a more complex social stratification, which saw the emergence of new groups with more modest means alongside a restricted aristocracy. Among the larger complexes, the Tomb of the Fans (Tomba dei Flabelli) of Poggio della Porcareccia stands out, one of the richest in northern Etruria.

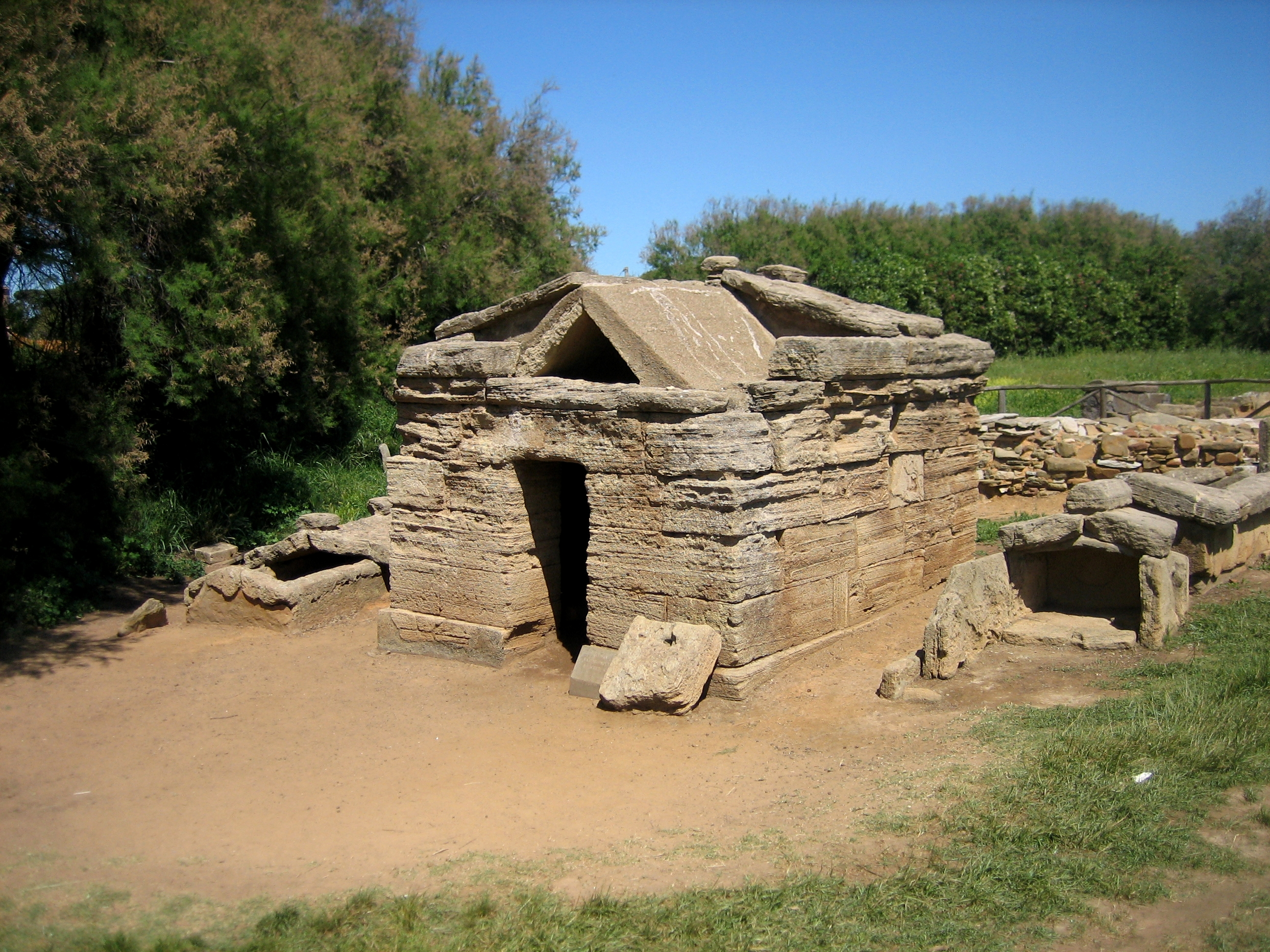
Tomb of the Bronze Statuette (530-500 BC)

Bronze statuette from the tomb

The "Aedicule tombs", dating essentially to the 6th century BC and used for a long period of time, have a small temple shape and were also decorated with statues. Rarer than the others, they imitate real buildings: squared bench blocks on a moulded podium, a single rectangular room, a double-pitched roof with clay decoration, antefixes in the shape of a Silenus and a Maenad's head and kalypteres, or with stone acroteria. This type was also probably used for several members of the same family, linked to the aristocracy, and remained in use in the 5th century BC, when cremation re-emerges. The best-preserved aedicule tomb, of the Bronze Statuette (Bronzetto di offertore), is in the Casone necropolis, a few steps from today's beach: the strongly squared construction has a characteristic roof made of monolithic slabs with a double pitch and originally decorated with clay antefixes and acroteria.

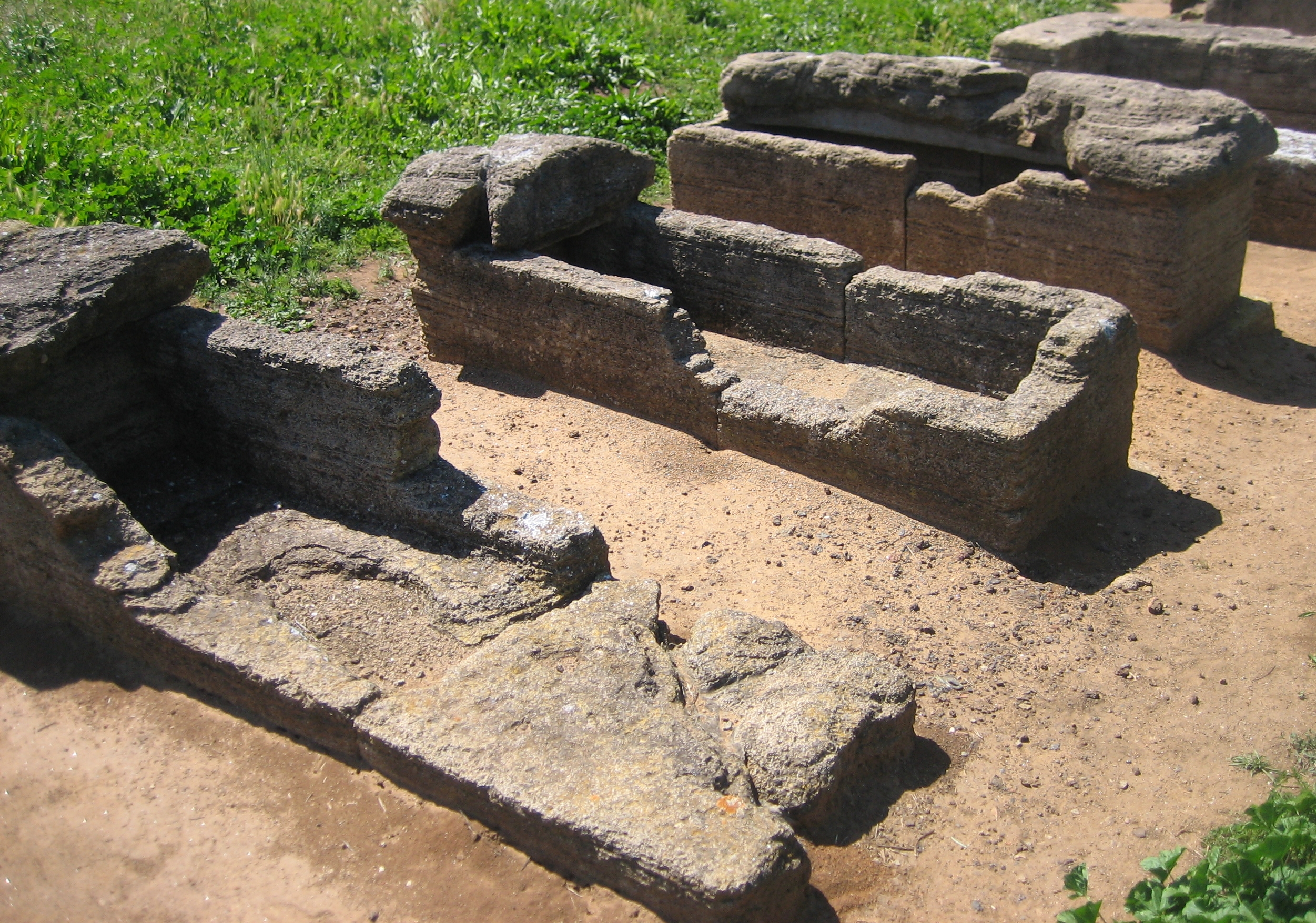
Sarcophagus tombs

The "box tombs" or "sarcophagus tombs", usually individual, began to be used from the end of the 6th century BC. They are similar to sarcophagi, even without the elaborate decorations that are usually associated with the idea of an Etruscan sarcophagus, but they were not contained within other structures: each sarcophagus is a tomb in its own right. Most of them are built in "panchino stone", while one, in nenfro (volcanic stone) would seem to be imported. The lid is double-pitched and in some cases has stone acroteria; these burials were often marked on the surface by stele with an anthemion of Greek-oriental type or by club-shaped cippi, also known in the Volterra area and in the Po Valley.

Around the middle of the 6th century BC the use of tumuli ceased, while the depositions in the already constructed chambers continued in the second half of the century and beyond, as shown by the frequency of Attic ceramics in the grave goods.

==== Tomb of the goldsmiths (Oreficerie) ====
Gold, tomb of the goldsmiths, 650-600 BC

Gold, tomb of the goldsmiths

Dating to between 640 and 550BC, the tomb escaped ancient tomb robbers and takes its name from the numerous jewels which adorned one of the deceased (a woman), a sign of the rich articles of clothing with which high-ranking members of Etruscan society were buried. These masterpieces are the result of sophisticated gold-working methods based on a thorough understanding of the properties of metals, and due to contacts with Greek and Phoenician jewellers who had, in turn, learnt them from Syrian and Egyptian craftsmen. The small spheres used in granulation, for example, are obtained by heating the gold with charcoal dust and fixed to the support using a special flux, malachite, found in the Campiglia area.

The tomb also contained other valuable objects and a very refined set of pottery used for the funeral banquet, which was then left inside the tomb for the deceased's use in the afterlife.

==== The Tomb of the Fans (Flabelli) ====
The tomb, excavated in 1927, and of 7th and 6th centuries BC was found intact with many contents which allowed a precise picture of this kind of burial. Externally, the presence of the tomb was indicated by two marker stones (stelae) set vertically into the ground. Inside the chamber were two funeral beds decorated with miniature columns, adorned with thin sheets of bronze in the upper section.

One of the four people in the chamber was a woman accompanied by rich grave goods including three bronze fans (flabelli) very similar in shape to feather fans. Another of a man featured weapons, and a helmet made in Corinth.

from the Flabelli tomb (Florence museum)

Balsamarium

Grater

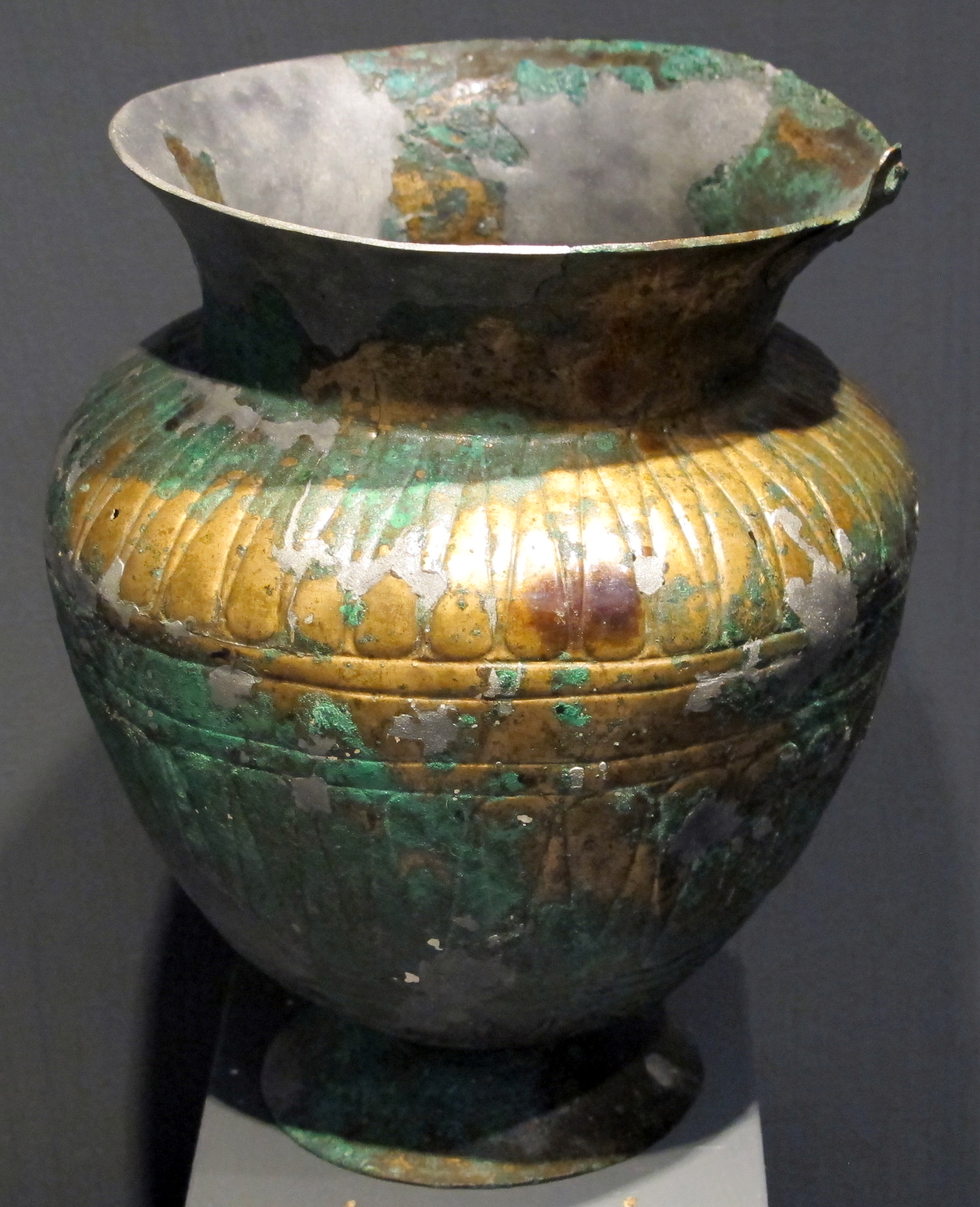

==== Tomb of the Chariots (Carri) ====
The tomb was excavated in 1914 and 1921. From the long access corridor three small rooms lead off inside each of which were highly valuable objects including: bronze and iron decorations belonging to a processional chariot, parts of a war chariot and an ivory horn decorated with thin sheets of gold. However, as few objects were found inside the burial chamber the chamber had already been robbed, but a gold fibula, two small pendants of gold leaf, and other objects remained. The chariots (in the Florence museum) had been dismantled to get them though the narrow entrance; the processional chariot had bronze plates covering the wooden and leather frame with iron inlays showing hunting scenes, with vegetable and animal motifs.

The deceased were laid on funerary beds of limestone slabs, decorated with miniature columns in the shape of the feet of ordinary household wooden beds. This tomb is the clearest symbol of the presence of powerful aristocracies which, in the mid-7th century BC, celebrated their wealth in funeral monuments. In the following centuries up until the 3rd century BC, other tombs were placed in the vicinity of the tomb, and within the layer of metal slag which covered it. Some of these later tombs were in the form of a sarcophagus, but are no longer visible.

== The metals industry ==
In geology, the "Tuscan metallogenic province" is derived from volcanic intrusions into southern Etruria due to extension of the crust there (which also created a karst topography in western Italy) from the late Miocene to the Pleistocene. This process emplaced iron oxide deposits on Elba, pyrite in southern Tuscany and various kinds of skarn including copper-bearing in the Colline Metallifere, called Etruria Mineraria in the Middle Ages.

Especially of interest to the Etruscans and later Romans of Populonia were the polymetallic ores of Campiglia Marittima, which contain copper, lead, zinc, iron, silver and tin; in short, all the ingredients for bronze and steel with the added bonus of silver.

The first evidence of an artisan smelting district in the lower city dates to the 8th century BC and concerns the working of copper. The systematic exploitation of Elban iron begins only from the 7th, if not the 6th century BC. The oldest known ironworks, at Porcareccia, dates to the second half of the 6th century BC and overlaps with an area which in the 8th and 7th centuries had been used as a necropolis which corresponds to the Etruscan urban principle of placing the temple of Vulcan and the fire activities outside the inhabited area; archaic ovens for the roasting of Elban haematite have also been identified north of Follonica.

From the second half of the 5th century BC the industrial district extended around Baratti bay and Elban ore was smelted on a massive scale. From the 4th-3rd century BC the mighty accumulations of ferrous slag, which reached up to 20 metres in depth over a surface of around 200,000 m^{2} progressively obliterated the most ancient necropoleis and continued until the 1st century BC. Although mining on the peninsula had been banned by the Roman senate, that did not affect the Elban mines as they were insular and the mineral continued to be worked on the mainland.

The ancient slag-heaps are estimated to have weighed 2–4 million tons, representing an annual iron production of between 1,600 and 10,000 tons, according to varying modern estimates.

The iron slag was later mainly removed from the shores of the Gulf of Baratti while copper slag remains on the beach, which has been dated to the 9th and 8th centuries BC by radiocarbon methods.

== In literature ==
Populonia is mentioned in Horatius, the poem by English author Lord Macaulay: "From seagirt Populonia,/Whose sentinels descry/Sardinia's snowy mountain-tops/Fringing the southern sky", although Macaulay wrongly wrote that Sardinia is visible from it.

== See also ==
- Archaeological Museum of Populonia
- Baratti and Populonia Archeological Park
- Baratti
- Coinage of Populonia
- Etruscans
- Etruscan coins
- Piombino
- Populonia Stazione
- Volterra

== Bibliography ==
- Banti, Luisa (1973) [1968]. Etruscan cities and their culture. Berkeley: University of California Press.
- Benvenuti, M.; Boni, M.; Meinert, L. (2004). Skarn Deposits in Southern Tuscany and Elba Island (Central Italy). 32nd International Geological Congress; Volume No. 2 - From B16 to B33; Field Trip Guide Book - Pre-Congress B18. Florence: APAT – Italian Agency for the Environmental Protection and Technical Services.
- Cambi, Franco, and Giorgia Maria Francesca Di Paola. (2013). "Etruscan Strategies of Defense: Late Classical and Early Hellenistic Hilltop Fortresses in the Territory of Populonia." Etruscan Studies 16 (2): 190–209.
- Haynes, Sybille (2000). Etruscan Civilization. Los Angeles: The J. Paul Getty Trust.
