= Museo etnologico delle Apuane =

Anthropological museum in Massa, Tuscany, Italy

Coordinates: 44.0334°N 10.1149°E

The Museo etnologico delle Apuane (Ethnological Museum) is an anthropological and ethnographical museum of the Apuan Alps, located in Massa, Tuscany, Italy.
