= Archaeological Museum of Populonia =

Museum in Italy

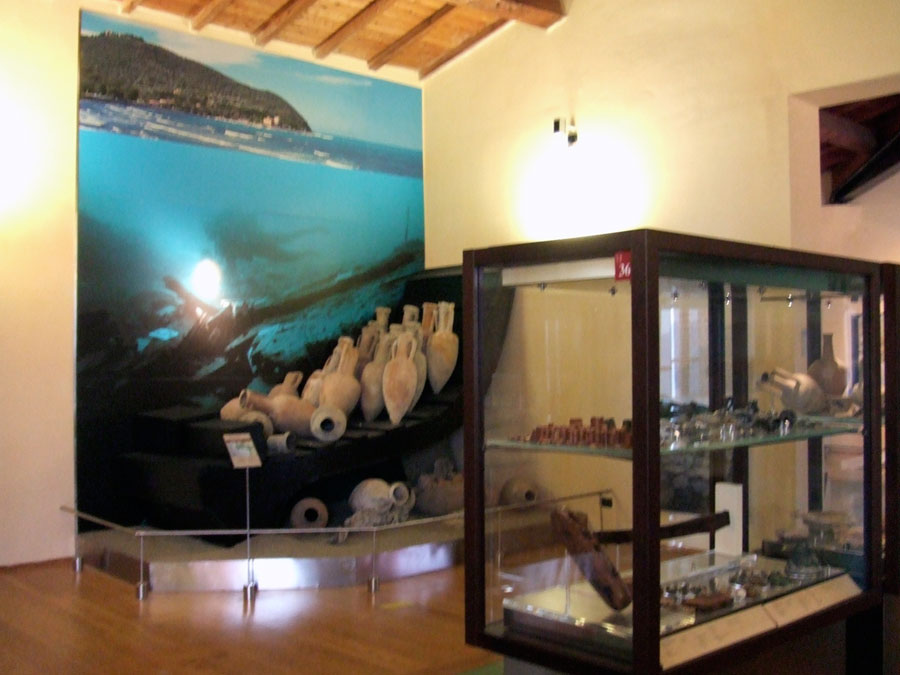
- Established: 2001
- Location: Piombino, Italy
- Type: archaeology museum
- Collection size: 1,953 item, 1,600 item
- Visitors: 2,897 (2020)

The Archaeological Museum of Populonia is in Piombino and contains artifacts from the ancient territory of Populonia from prehistory to late antiquity.

== The building ==
The museum is located in a historic building that was part of the Citadel, the seat of the princes of Appiani and later of Princess Elisa Baciocchi, sister of Napoleon.

== Exhibition ==
The museum illustrates the history of the territory and the use of its resources, in particular mining.

The organization within the museum follows the chronological history of the area: the first rooms are devoted to prehistoric artifacts (from the Stone age to the Bronze Age), the center rooms to the Etruscan period, and the last to the Roman period and late antiquity. There are also exhibited models of production facilities (ovens and proto-historic Etruscans), a tomb, and the cargo of a ship.

=== The Baratti Amphora ===
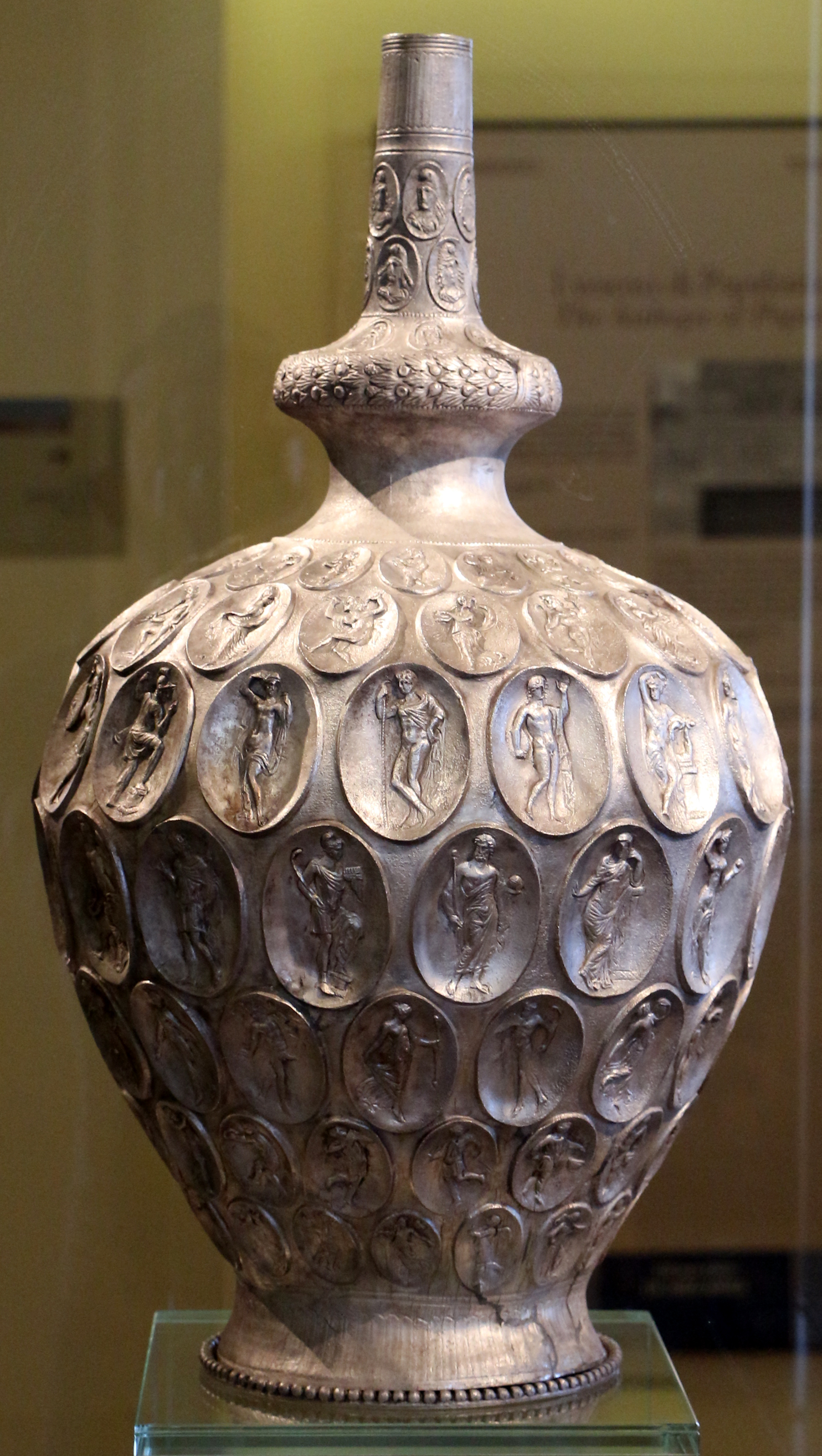
Baratti Amphora, silver about 390 AD

This is the most important artifact in the museum, accidentally found at sea in the nets of a fishing vessel in the Gulf of Baratti in 1968 and carefully restored. This vase dating from the 4th century AD is decorated with 134 medallions depicting myths and pagan gods, linked to the worship of the goddess Cybele.

Not only is this a rare piece of silverware, but it is also an example illustrating the persistence of pagan culture in the Roman Empire after the conversion to Christianity.

=== Other finds ===
Other important items at the museum include the fish mosaic, depicting a shipwreck scene and dating to the 2nd century BC, the Tesoretto Rimigliano (a collection of Roman coins found at sea), the cargo of the wreck of Pozzino (from the 2nd century BC), and several sets of Etruscan tombs. Among the tombs are the Tomb of Goldsmiths (7th century BC), the Tomb of the Bidder Bronzetto (6th-4th century BC) and the Tomb of the Cave 14 (4th-3rd century BC) found during an excavation in 1997-1998.

A stone engraving of a bison in prehistoric times is another item that stands out.

== Bibliography ==
G. De Tommaso, Populonia. Una città e il suo territorio. Guida al Museo Archeologico di Piombino, Poggibonsi 2003

== See also ==
- Piombino
- Populonia
- Baratti (town)
- Necropolis of Populonia
- Baratti and Populonia Archeological Park
