= Ecomuseo della Montagna Pistoiese =

Museum in Tuscany, Italy

Coordinates: 44°03′23.4″N 10°49′15.6″E

The Ecomuseo della Montagna Pistoiese (Ecomuseum of the Pistoian Mountain Region) is a partly open-air museum, located in the mountainous part of the Province of Pistoia, Tuscany, Italy. It covers a variety of thematic areas, from proto-industrial activities to daily life, at a number of sites. The unifying focus is on ecology, or more precisely the integration of humanity into nature.

== History ==
Founded in 1990, the ecomuseum consists of a coordinated assemblage of open-air itineraries with museums and teaching centers, within the Pistoian Mountain Region of the Northern Apennines. Currently there are six itineraries, each with its own museum and related teaching materials. The administrative center of the museum is in the historic Palazzo Achilli at Gavinana, in San Marcello Pistoiese; it is equipped with interactive learning laboratories, the Central Information Point, reception facilities, and audio and visual archives on the traditions of the region.

== Itineraries ==
1. Ice Itinerary - Ice was formerly produced in ice houses, to be sold in the cities in the summer months and also for supply to hospital facilities
2. Iron Itinerary - The energy of moving water was used to work iron
3. Sacred Art and Popular Religion Itinerary
4. Everyday Life Itinerary
5. Nature Itinerary
6. Stone Itinerary

== See also ==
- Open-air museum
- Ecomuseum
