= Archaeological Area of Poggio del Molino =

Coordinates: 43°0′52.8″N 10°30′55.6″E

The archaeological area of Poggio del Molino is situated on the northern side of a headland that acts as a watershed between the beach of Rimigliano in the north, and the Gulf of Baratti in the south; to the northern border of the territory administered by the city of Piombino in the Italian Province of Livorno. The structure of Roman age spreads over a high plateau of about 20 m asl which dominates, in the west, the stretch of a sea between San Vincenzo and Elba and to the east, the metalliferous hills and plains of the Campiglia lagoon. The top of the hill is occupied by the beautiful Villa del Barone, built in 1923 by Baron Luigi De Stefano and Assunta Vanni Desideri, the daughter of Eugenio. From a paper of the 16th century, the "Bandita di Porto Baratti", and some archival documents we know that the Poggio owes its name to the mill which was a part of Torre Nuova (“Torre nuova del molino”), the building of coastal defense and a lookout built in the early sixteenth century by Cosimo I de' Medici, on the slopes of the promontory.

== Prehistoric and Protohistoric Age ==
The hill of Poggio del Molino has been inhabited since Prehistoric times, as indicated by the stone tools of the Middle and Upper Paleolithic Ages found at the ‘Villa del Barone’, on the eastern and southern side of the headland. During the Bronze Age, at the same site, a village dated to the Late Bronze Age (XI-X secolo a.C.), flourished to which a necropolis was linked, between the ‘Villa del Barone’ and Poggio San Leonardo, where about fifty globular or biconical urns, dated to the proto-Villanovan facies, were found. The economic purpose of the community was connected to the mineral resources of the mountains of Campiglia (processing of copper and lead) and with marine activities (trade, fishing and shellfish harvesting). At the beginning of the Iron Age the population tended to concentrate around the Gulf of Baratti and the Poggio del Molino seemed to be uninhabited until at least the Republican Age.

== Roman era ==
=== Late Republican Age to 2nd century CE ===
During the 1st century BCE, coinciding with the gradual abandonment of the urban centre of Populonia, the number of archaeological records in the territories north of Baratti increased. The eastern side of the hill is occupied by a mighty wall of stone and mortar which defines an almost square area used, at least in part, as workshop for iron smelting. Archaeological excavations in progress are bringing to light substantial deposits clearly related to metallurgical activities: tight sequences of layers rich in hematite, coal, ore, iron slag and plans made of burned clay. Some fragments of black slip pottery and a silver coin of Calpurnius Piso, allow us to trace the craft back to the 1st century BCE. In the period between the end of the 1st century BCE and the 2nd century CE, yet to be determined with accuracy as it is a work in progress, in the northern sector of the settlement a workshop area for fish processing is established. In this area, some rectangular basins coated with hydraulic mortar (cocciopesto) interpreted as cetariae: (structures used for the salting of fish and production of garum and salsamenta), known throughout the Mediterranean Sea have been found.

=== 3rd century CE ===
At the end of the 2nd century CE the settlement of Poggio del Molino is fully restored: in the interior of the massive wall a villa with the characteristics of a luxury residence is built. Around a large open court (perhaps a garden with peristilium), in the southwest, there are residential rooms richly decorated with wall paintings and floor mosaics; until now two cubicula separated by a triclinium and interpreted as hospitalia have been excavated. To the northwest side of the court there are the baths, whose supply provides a powerful raised tank, powered by a well which was probably connected to a supply system operated by a large wheel. The tepidarium and the caldarium, the only rooms excavated so far, are also decorated with paintings and mosaics. To the north, along the escarpment overlooking the sea, a sort of belvedere developed to join the thermae and the hospitalia, which is equipped with basins and fountains. To the south another open area stretched out, intended for craft activities, occupied in the center by a small square room, with a cocciopesto floor.

=== 4th century CE ===
At the beginning of the 4th century the rooms of the complex, though dilapidated, appear re-occupied: but life is now taking place in small rooms poorly built on the collapsed baths and even within the ruins of the hospitalia which are never rebuilt, which certainly takes away the luxuries of an urban residence. It is at this moment that it begin the production of iron artifacts, probably intended solely for personal use. Kitchenware, oil lamps and terra sigillata produced in Africa bear witness to the continuity of employment until the end of the 4th century, before the partial abandonment, perhaps as a result of Visigoth invasion.

== Late Antiquity (5th – 7th century CE) ==
Even in the middle of the 5th century, a simple burial pit was dug in the rubble of one of the rooms of the hospitalia, eating away at the mosaic floor. In the 7th century, at the time of the Longobardian conquest, the ruins of the villa provide shelter to isolated sporadic groups of pastoralists and refugees.

== Archaeological research ==
The first systematic research on Poggio del Molino was conducted in the early seventies by volunteers of the Archaeological Association of Piombino; their intervention made it possible to clarify the dimensions of the archaeological site and the identification of the repeated destructive actions of looters. Between 1984 and 1988 a team of archaeologists from the University of Florence, led by Professor Vincenzo Saladino, undertook the first systematic excavation of the villa. Although the investigations, in which the students of the Institute of Archaeology of Florence took part, had brought to light only a limited portion of the house, they allowed him to define the basic features associated with the arrangement of the settlement in the 3rd century. After being abandoned for twenty years, a new season of archaeological excavations started in 2008, forming part of a research project led by the Superintendence for Archaeological Heritage in Tuscany, in collaboration with the University of Florence, and coordinated on the field by a team of archaeologists who belong to Archeodig Project, supported by Earthwatch Institute and by the Cultural Association Past in Progress .

The overall objective of the project is to contribute to the knowledge of the history of the territory of Populonia from the late Republican age to the early Middle Ages. The details of the life stages connected to the Roman occupation of this strip of the Tyrrhenian coast are still indeed, largely unknown. The primary objective is to bring to light the monument in its entirety, to reconstruct its appearance in the various stages of life, from the Roman age to Late Antiquity, and to understand their relationships with the surrounding area (the sea, the lake at Rimigliano, the road system, the mines of Elba Island and Campiglia, etc.).

The Archaeological Museum of the territory of Populonia in Piombino has a section devoted to the Villa of Poggio del Molino, which displays a selection of materials collected during the excavations in the ‘80s. Some of the most significant findings which emerged in the course of ongoing investigations serve to enrich the Museum's collection. In particular, since May 2010, two enormous blocks of stone with an inscription of numerals have been on display in the section of Roman epigraphy in the Museum.

== Bibliography ==
Prehistoric and Protostoric Time

- A. Galiberti, L. Perrini, 1997, Il musteriano denticolato su ciottoletto di Villa del Barone (Piombino, LI): aspetti tecnologici e tipologici, «Rassegna di Archeologia», 14, pp. 55–87.
- F. Fedeli, A. Galiberti, A. Romualdi, 1993, Populonia e il suo territorio. Profilo storico-archeologico, Firenze.

The Roman Settlement

- S. Bertone, 1995, Mosaici della villa romana di Poggio del Molino a Populonia, Atti del II Colloquio dell’Associazione italiana per lo studio e la conservazione del mosaico, (Roma 1994), Bordighera, pp. 159–162.
- G. De Tommaso (ed.), 1998, La villa romana di Poggio del Molino (Piombino-LI). Lo scavo e i materiali, «Rassegna di Archeologia», 15, pp. 119–348.
- G. De Tommaso, 2003, Populonia. Una città e il suo territorio. Guida al Museo Archeologico di Piombino, Siena.
- G. De Tommaso, 2008, Villa di Poggio del Molino, in G. BIANCHI (ed.), Guida all’archeologia medievale della provincia di Livorno, Firenze, pp. 135–136.
- G. De Tommaso, F. Ghizzani Marcìa, C. Megale, 2010, Piombino (LI). Populonia, Villa di Poggio del Molino: nuove indagini, le campagne 2008 e 2009, «Notiziario della Soprintendenza per i Beni Archeologici della Toscana», 5/2009, pp. 352–356.
- G. De Tommaso, F. Ghizzani Marcìa, C. Megale, 2010, La villa romana di Poggio del Molino e il Progetto Archeodig: un nuovo approccio all’archeologia sul campo, in G. Baratti, F. Fabiani (eds.), Materiali per Populonia 9, Pisa, pp. 163–180.
- F. Fedeli, 1983, Populonia. Storia e Territorio, Firenze.
- F. Redi, 1996, Insediamento e strutture materiali a Populonia in età medievale e moderna, in M.L. Ceccarelli Lemut, G. Garzella (eds.), Populonia e Piombino in età medievale e moderna, Pisa, pp. 53–82.
- V. Saladino, E.J. Shepherd, G. De Tommaso, G. Poggesi, 1984, La villa romana di Poggio del Molino: campagna di scavo 1984, «Rassegna di Archeologia», 4, pp. 319–335.
- V. Saladino, 1995, La villa romana sul Poggio del Molino (Populonia) e il lago di Rimigliano. Aspetti di continuità nell’uso del territorio, «La Colombaria», Atti e memorie dell’accademia toscana di scienze e lettere, LX, n.s. XLVI, pp. 31–101.
- E.J. Shepherd (ed.), 1986–1987, Villa romana di Poggio del Molino (Populonia-Livorno), «Rassegna di Archeologia», 6, pp. 273–300.
