= Baratti and Populonia Archeological Park =

Site in Livorno, Italy

Coordinates: 42°59′33″N 10°30′02″E

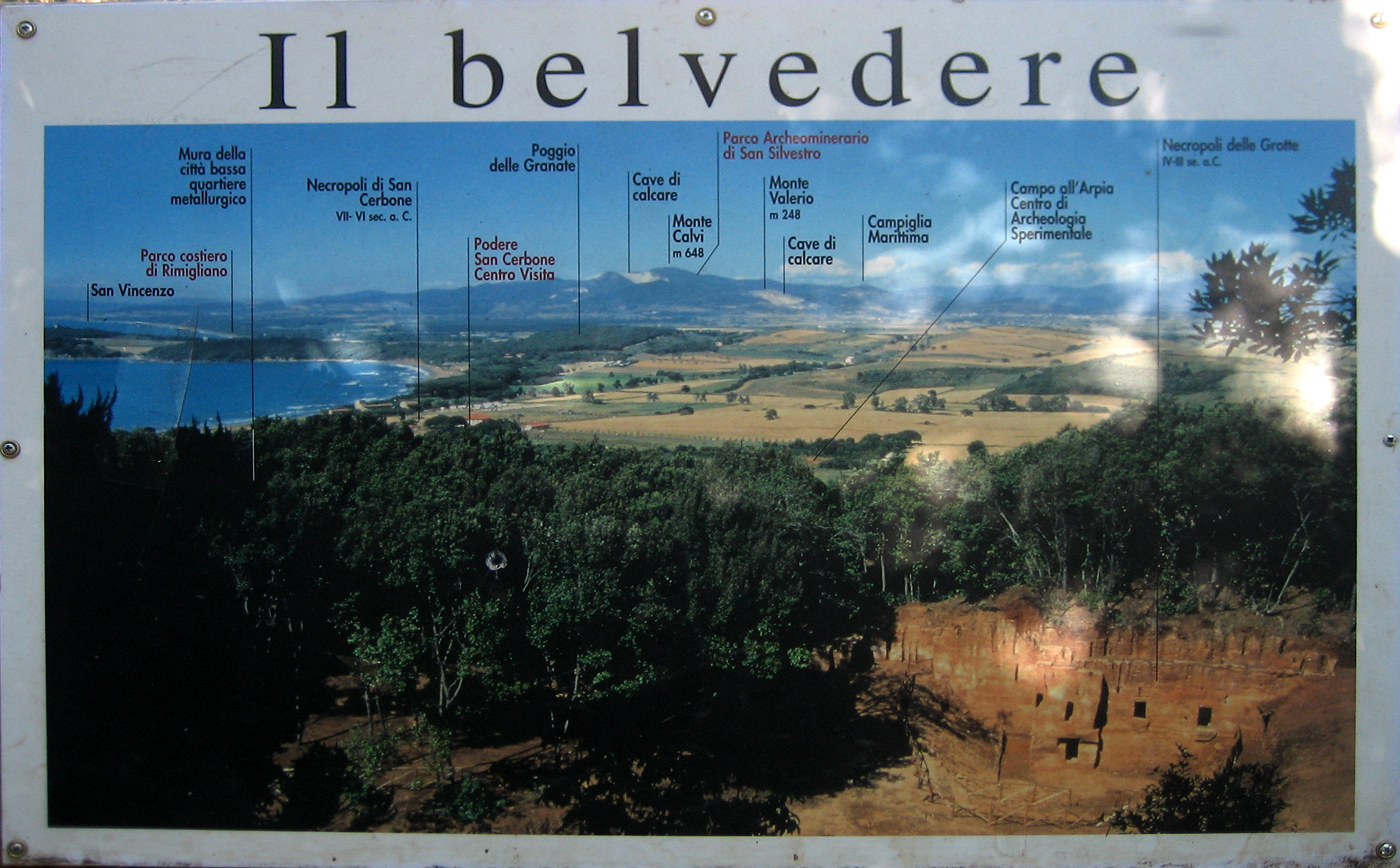
View over the park from the edge of the heights. The Bay of Baratti is visible on the left.

The Archaeological Park of Baratti and Populonia is located in the township of Piombino (Province of Livorno) and covers about 80 hectares between the slopes of the promontory of Piombino and the Gulf of Baratti coast. It is part of The Parks of Val di Cornia and was opened in 1998 for visitors to view some of the archaeological sites and remains found in the new digs archaeological conducted in the area since 1996.

The park includes several areas from the ancient Etruscan city of Populonia, the necropolis of San Cerbone, Casone and the grotto, and the cave of calcarenite. Inside the park is an experimental archeological laboratory.

There are currently several proposed routes:

- San Cerbone necropolis, with tombs from the 7th-6th century BC;
- the "Via delle Cave": from fields of the Arpa, a path leading to Etruscan cave of calcarenite (or stone bench), with tombs carved into the rock of the necropolis from the 4th-3rd BC
- the "Via del Ferro" a path along the coast with the experimental archeology laboratory, which offers a glimpse into the industrial districts of the city, where housing buildings for the manufacture of iron can be found dating from the (6th-3rd century BC);
- nature trails along the edge of the Caves.

In 2007 a third area of the park was opened, the acropolis, which is located at the Castle in upper Populonia and includes remains from the most ancient Etruscans, up to the Romans.

== See also ==
- Archaeological Area of Poggio del Molino
- Baratti (town)
- Populonia

== Bibliography ==
- Andrea Semplici, Parco Archeologico di Baratti e Populonia. Percorsi di visita per conoscere un territorio, Firenze, Edizioni Polistampa, 2000
