= Baratti, Italy =

Baratti
- Frazione
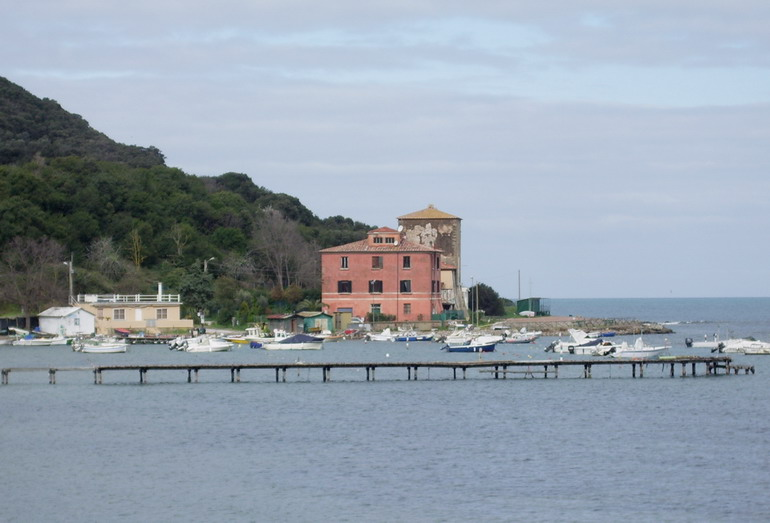
- The little port and the tower

- Location of Baratti in Italy
- Coordinates: 42°59′52.8″N 10°31′2.6″E
- Country: Italy
- Region: Tuscany
- Province: Livorno
- Comune: Piombino
- Elevation: 8 m (26 ft)

Population (2010)
  - Total: 15
- Time zone: UTC+1 (CET)
  - Summer (DST): UTC+2 (CEST)
- Postal code: 57020
- Dialing code: 0565

Baratti is a village frazione of the comune of Piombino in the Province of Livorno, with roughly only 15 residents.

== History ==
Just like its neighbour Populonia, Baratti has Etruscan origins, confirmed by various burial mounds found around the area and reflecting the colonization of this civilization. The main activity pursued here during the Etruscan period and then the Roman Empire was centered on the port of Populonia, which mainly dealt with goods such as iron ore from the nearby Island of Elba and finished metal products found in the local area. The accumulation of iron debris covered the entire area of Baratti overlooking the sea, allowing rare archaeological insight into the area's heritage. The first archaeological expeditions resulted in impressive discoveries preserved in the area. In 1968, a 6th-century silver vase, or anfora, from Antioch and lost in a shipwreck was found off the gulf. This was later renamed the "Anfora Baratti" and has been preserved in the Archaeological Museum of Populonia in Piombino.

== Geography ==
=== Gulf of Baratti ===
This small bay sits between the Ligurian Sea and the Tyrrhenian Sea to the north of the peninsula, which forms much of the town of Piombino. The basin lies between the promontory of Populonia and Torraccia, which is part of the municipality of San Vincenzo.

=== Location ===
Baratti stands on the Tyrrhenian coast, at the foot of Populonia, which is 1.5 km (0.93 mi) away, 12 km (7.5 mi) from Piombino, 15 km (9.3 mi) from San Vincenzo, and about 80 km (50 mi) from Livorno in the north and Grosseto in the south.

== Places of interest ==
Baratti is included in the Baratti and Populonia Archeological Park and is one of the largest parks in the Val di Cornia. The influx of the archaeological tourist is secured not only by the presence of the Etruscan ruins but also because of the proximity of Populonia and its necropolis, which is reachable by a road that passes by Baratti.

At the port stands the fifteenth-century Baratti Tower, while farther north along the bay is the chapel of San Cerbone.

Nearby lies the Saldarini House, a remarkable testimony of contemporary architecture, designed and built by Italian architect Vittorio Giorgini. The Saldarini house takes a beautiful organic shape, made of wire mesh and ferrocement. It was completed by the architect in 1962.
