= Barat =

Barat may refer to:

== People ==
=== Given name ===
- Barat Ali Batoor (born 1983), Afghan photographer
- Barat Shakinskaya (1914–1999), Azerbaijani and Soviet stage and film actress

=== Surname ===
- Andy Barat (born 1997), Comorian canoeist
- Anne-Marie Barat (1948–1990), French classical organist
- Carl Barât (born 1978), English musician, actor and author
- František Barát (born 1950), Czech footballer
- Kahar Barat (born 1950), Uyghur-American historian
- Leonid Barats (born 1971), Russian actor, screenwriter and film producer
- Madeleine Sophie Barat (1779 – 1865), French Catholic saint
- Nicolas Barat (?–1706) French Catholic scholar of Hebrew works

== Places ==
- Barat, NWFP, town in Pakistan
- Barát, the Hungarian name for Baraţi, a village in Romania
- Barat (Kanfanar), a village in Croatia
- Barat, Višnjan, a village in Croatia

=== Schools ===
- Barat Academy in Chesterfield, Missouri, USA
- Barat College, former college in Lake Forest, Illinois, USA
- Groupe scolaire Sophie-Barat in Châtenay-Malabry, France
- Sophie-Barat-Schule in Hamburg, Germany

== Other uses ==
- Shab-e-barat is a Muslim holiday celebrated on the 14th night of the month of Sha'aban
- Lailatul Barat or Mid-Sha'ban, a Muslim holiday
- Baalat, 'Lady of Byblos', was the goddess of the city of Byblos, Phoenicia in ancient times.
- Baraat, a wedding procession in parts of south Asia
- Barat (wind)
- Barat (film), a 1942 Bollywood film
- West direction in Malay languages, both Indonesian and Bahasa Malaysia

== See also ==
- Bharat (disambiguation)
- Barati (disambiguation)
- Barad (name)
- Borat, a 2006 Sacha Baron Cohen mockumentary
  - Borat Sagdiyev, central character in the mockumentary
