= Barad =

Barad may refer to:

- Barad, Syria, a historic village in Syria
- Barad (name), a surname and given name
- Barad (band), an Iranian rock band
- Barye or barad, a CGS unit of pressure
- Barad, the Hebrew name for the seventh of the ten Biblical Plagues of Egypt
