= Barati =

Barati may refer to:

== People ==
- George Barati (1913–1996) a Hungarian cellist, composer, and conductor
- Éva Barati (born 1968 in Üröm) is a Hungarian athlete
- Kristóf Baráti (born 1979) is a Hungarian classical violinist
- Reza Barati (1988–2014), Kurdish Iranian asylum seeker murdered in Australia's Manus Regional Processing Centre

== Others ==
- Barati (1954 film), 1954 Indian film
- Barați, a village in Mărgineni, Bacău, Romania

== See also ==
- Baratie (disambiguation)
- Bharati (disambiguation)
- Baratti (disambiguation)
- Barate
- Barat (disambiguation)
- Bharat (disambiguation)
