= Henri de Boulainvilliers =

French Nobleman, Historian, Writer, and Soldier

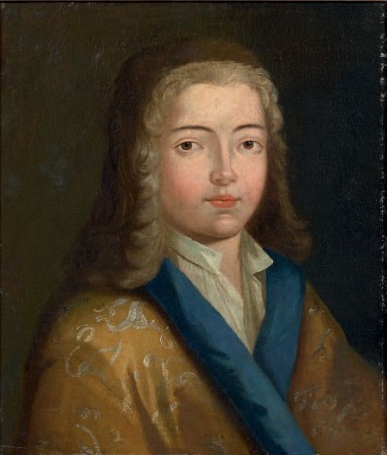
The alleged portrait of Henri de Boulainvilliers

Henri de Boulainvilliers (French: [aʁi d(ə) bulɛ̃vilje]; 21 October 1658, Saint-Saire, Province of Normandy – 23 January 1722, Paris) was a French nobleman, writer and historian. He was educated at the College of Juilly; he served in the army until 1697.

Primarily remembered as an early modern historian of France, Boulainvilliers also published an early French translation of Spinoza's Ethics and wrote on topics as diverse as astrology, physics, philosophy and theology. His theory that French nobility is of Germanic origins while the Third Estate is of Celtic origin inspired Arthur de Gobineau.

The Comte de Boulainvilliers traced his lineage to the House of Croÿ, to Jean de Croÿ, sire de Clery et de Boulainviller, who died in the Battle of Poitiers (1356). At the time of his birth, however, the family's fortune had declined significantly. Much of Boulainvilliers' historical work and political life centered on the decline of the nobility.

== Education ==
In 1669, Henri de Boulainvilliers went to study at the Collège de Juilly, one of the most famous schools of the Congregation of the Oratory of Philip Neri. Natural philosophy, history and geographywere taught there. The philosopher Malebranche being one of the great educators at the Oratory, Cartesianism was allowed reference in the classroom from 1662 until 1675 when it was banned by Royal decree. In 1673, Henry studied rhetoric with his teacher Richard Simon, who was excluded from the Oratory (1678) because of his critical Bible studies.

The education at Juilly had great impact on Boulainvilliers: a special accent on critical history had been introduced into the Oratory by Caesar Baronius and Richard Simon, and through the science classes he became familiar with the works of Jean Baptist van Helmont, Robert Boyle and Edme Mariotte.

Since he had also received private lessons in the German language, it is not inconceivable that he was able to read van Helmont in Dutch that author used as a critical means to an accessible reading of medicine in the Low Countries, and which so fluently worded his rich independence of mind.

== Physics ==
In 1683 Boulainvilliers wrote l'Idée d'un Système Général de la Nature, based on his reading of Jan Baptist van Helmont and Robert Boyle, followed by Archidoxes de Paracelsus, avec une préface sur les principes de l'art chimique.

By 1715-1720, he wrote his Traité d'astronomie physique using the Cartesian method, commenting on the nature of gravity and the movement of planets and drawing on sources such as Jean-Baptiste du Hamel and Huygens.

He described his method as experimental philosophy and closely preceded the Dutch experimentalists led by Anthony Leeuwenhoek (Nieuwentijt, Boerhave, Volder)

He retained affection for astrology, for which he was famous in Court gossip.

== Critical history ==
In a Lettre à Mlle Cousinot sur l'histoire de France et le choix des historiens, he explained why the writing of history was to be more than the "amateur" collection of dates and anecdotes related to old coins (numismatics) and stones: The knowledge of history pertained to a distinct moral character of society. Related causes of past events, such as the 1346 Battle of Crécy during the Hundred Years' War, could be instructive on related measures in the present — how to do things better or worse. Sometimes we want to know not only what a historical figure has done, but by what right he might have done so differently.

He stressed in his writings the corruption absolutism played in the fall of France when he contrasts the role English and French historians were able to investigate history. For instance, when stressing the importance of sources in developing fact, he contrasted Thomas Rymer's way of access to the London archives to that of his own where he had to bribe the keepers of the French archives. For his neutral reasoning, his works were cited by subsequent writers whose works would prove influential in the development of Western political thought and historical research.

== Philosophy ==
Parallel to his historical studies ran an untiring interest in philosophy which he wrote down in Considérations abrégées des operations de l'entendement sur les idées on the model borrowed from the famous Port-Royal Logic by Antoine Arnauld: psychology of the mind, logic, and method; to which he added ontology. His influences, apart from the Schola of his early education, were Gassendi, Descartes, Malebranche, Locke and Spinoza.

== Spinoza ==
Boulainvilliers's translation of Spinoza's Ethics was not published until 1907 by Colonna d'Istria from an unsigned manuscript at Lyon.

Boulainvilliers's study of Spinoza, as captured in the collected treatises published by Renée Simon (1973), shows an exceptional development from a basic criticism to an enlightened understanding marked by the incredibly generous way in which he let his opponent use his own voice.

In the Essay de Métaphysique dans les principes de B...de Sp... he translated Spinoza's "geometrical method" into an accessible French, closely following its original meaning without incisive criticism.

In the Exposition du système de Benoit Spinosa et sa defense contre les objections de M. Régis he voiced the defense of Spinoza against his cartesian critic Pierre-Sylvain Régis. The comte Boulainvilliers was no blind follower of Descartes; he knew how to make use of his method, but he could equally well criticise him on metaphysical points.

This unusual way of writing philosophy led to the gossip that he was a Spinozist and therefore an atheist. Yet in his persistent criticism of Spinoza's monism (through the concept of the "unity of substance"), in writings inaccessible to the multitude, his independent judgement remained unspoilt. After his death his name was frequently used to circulate anti-religious treatises, leading to still more confusion about his intellectual identity.

With Matthieu Marais he shared a friendship with another great student of Spinoza, Pierre Bayle.

== Molinos ==
Less well known but as important in his time was the similar treatment he gave to the mysticism of Molinos in Extrait du livre du ministre Pierre Jurieu touchant les dogmes des mystiques et particulièrement contre Messieurs de Cambray et de Méaux. By the time the reader finished his lecture he had a complete survey of the works of Molinos, thus recapitulating the famous disagreements over Quietism.

Such are the traits that can make one regret the criticism — amply justified in retrospect — that Boulainvilliers, elsewhere, brought over himself by his brutal stance on feudalism; traits for which he equally deserves to be known to a larger circle of students.

== Bibliography ==
Boulainvilliers wrote a number of historical works (published after his death), of which the most important were the following:

- Histoire de l'ancien gouvernement de la France (La Haye, 1727)
- Etat de la France, avec des memoires sur l'ancien gouvernement (London, 1727)
- Histoire de la pairie de France (London, 1753)
- Histoire des Arabes avec la Vie de Mahomet (1731). Translation (s.d. 18th century) reprinted (2001) as The Life of Mohammad: Or The Life of Mahomet, Henri de Boulainvilliers. Kessinger Publishing's Rare Reprints ISBN 0-7661-9102-8
- Essai sur la noblesse de France, contenans une dissertation sur son origine & abaissement. Avec des notes historiques, Critiques et Politiques; Un projet de Dissertation sur les premiers Français & leurs Colonies; et un Supplément aux notes par forme de Dictionnaire pour la Noblesse. Amsterdam, Rouen, 1732.
- Analyse du Traité Théologi-politique de Spinosa, par le comte de Boulainvilliers. Londres, 1767.

== See also ==
- Philosophy of history
