= Prabha =

Prabha may refer to:

== People with the given name ==
- Prabha Atre (born 1932), Indian classical singer
- Prabha Bannabilaya (1885–1948), princess of Siam
- Prabha Bharti (d. 2000s), one of the first Indian women qawaali singer (fl. 1960s-1990s)
- Prabha Kiran Jain (born 1963), Indian poet and author
- Prabha Ranatunge (born 1926), Sri Lankan female radio personality
- Prabha Rau (1935–2010), Indian politician
- Prabha (actress), South Indian actress
- Prabha Sinha (born 1950), Indian actress
- Prabha Thakur (born 1949), Indian politician

== People with the surname ==
- B. Prabha (1933–2001), Indian artist
- Rama Prabha (born 1947), Indian actress

== Other ==
- Andhra Prabha, a Telugu daily newspaper launched in 1938
- Kannada Prabha, a morning daily newspaper from the house of The New Indian Express Group

== See also ==
- Prabhas (disambiguation)
  - Prabhas (born 1979), Indian film actor
