= Bharat =

Bharat, or Bharath, may refer to:

== Places ==
- Bharat (term), the name for India in various Indian languages
  - India, a country
  - Bharata Khanda, the Sanskrit name for the Indian subcontinent
  - Bharatavarsha, another Sanskrit name for the Indian subcontinent
- Bharath University, in Chennai, India
- Barat, Bannu, also Bharat, a village in Khyber Pakhtunkhwa, Pakistan
- Pakpak Bharat, a regency in North Sumatra, Indonesia

== Arts and media ==
- Bharat (film), a 2019 Indian Hindi-language drama by Ali Abbas Zafar
- "Bharat", a song by A. R. Rahman and Hariharan from the 1992 Indian film Roja
  - "Bharat", a remake of the song from the 2025 Indian film The Diplomat

== Businesses and organizations ==
- Bharat Biotech, an Indian biotechnology company
- Bharat Electronics, an Indian aerospace and defence company
- Bharat FC, a former Indian professional football team
- Bharat Petroleum, an Indian oil and gas company

== People ==
- Bharat (given name), a contemporary given name (including a list of people with the name)
- Bharath (actor) (born 1983), Indian actor in Tamil cinema

== Other uses ==
- Bharat stage emission standards, a set of Indian emissions standards
- Bharatpol, Indian crime monitoring portal under the Central Bureau of Investigation

== See also ==
- Bharata (disambiguation)
- Barat (disambiguation)
- Bharati (disambiguation)
- Bharti (disambiguation)
- Bharatham, a 1991 Indian Malayalam-language musical-drama film directed by Sibi Malayil
- Bharatvarsh (TV series), Indian television documentary about the history of India
- Bhārata Mātā, the national personification of India as a mother goddess
- Bharathar, a Tamil caste in Tamil Nadu, India
- Bharathan (disambiguation)
- Bharatha people, Bharathar in Sri Lanka
- Bharatiana, a genus of Asian plant lice
- Baratha (moth), a synonym of genus Mocis
- Mahābhārata, a Sanskrit epic of ancient India
- Baharat, the Arabic word for "spices"
