= Bharti =

Bharti may refer to:

== People ==
=== Given name ===
- Bharti Singh (born 1984), Indian stand-up comedian and actress
- Sunil Bharti Mittal (born 1957), Indian businessman

=== Surname ===
- Divya Bharti (1974–1993), Indian actress
- Prabha Bharti (fl. 1960s-1990s), one of the first Indian women qawaali singers
- Somnath Bharti (born 1974), Indian lawyer and politician
- Uma Bharti, Indian politician, former Chief Minister of Madhya Pradesh

== Other uses ==
- Bharati (research station), an Antarctic research station commissioned by India
- Bharti Enterprises, a business conglomerate based in New Delhi, India
  - Bharti Airtel, an Indian global telecommunications services company based in New Delhi, India

== See also ==
- Barty, a surname and nickname
- Bharat (disambiguation)
- Bharata (disambiguation)
- Bharati (disambiguation)
