= Bharat (given name) =

Bharat (occasionally also romanised as Bharath or Bharata) is an Indian given name.

Notable people with the name include:

- Bharata, brother of Lord Rama
- Bharata, figure in the Mahabharata
- Bharata Muni, ancient Indian musicologist, author of the Natyashastra
- Bharath (actor) (born 1983), Indian Tamil film actor
- Bharath B. J., Indian music producer, composer and singer
- Bharat Mohan Adhikari (1936–2019), Nepali politician and freedom fighter
- Bharat Anand, American economist
- Bharat Awasthy (born 1938), Indian cricketer
- Bharat Bala, Indian film director, screenwriter and film producer
- Bharat Barot, Indian politician
- Bharat Bhushan (academic), American professor of bio/nanotechnology and biomimetics
- Bharat Bhushan (yogi) (born 1952), Indian yoga guru and author
- Bharat Bhushan Goswami (born 1955), Indian sarangi player
- Bharat Bhalke (died 2020), Indian politician
- Bharat Bhushan Ashu (born 1971), Indian politician
- Bharat Goenka, Indian industrialist
- Bharat Boghara, Indian politician and cotton producer
- Bharat B. Chattoo (1951–2016), scientist
- Bharat Chawda (born 1978), Indian television actor
- Bharat Chhikara (born 1985), Indian field hockey player
- Bharat Chipli (born 1983), Indian cricketer
- Bharat Singh Chowhan, Indian politician
- Bharat Desai (born 1952), American businessman
- Bharat Desai (cricketer), Indian cricketer
- Bharat Ganeshpure (born 1969), Marathi comedian
- Bharat Gopy (Kodiyettem Gopy, 1937–2008), Indian film actor, producer and director
- Bharat Gupt (born 1946), Indian professor of English, classicist and musicologist
- Bharat Gurung, Nepali aide-de-camp
- Bharrat Jagdeo (born 1966), Guyanese politician and former president
- Bharat Kamat (born 1967), Hindustani classical tabla player
- Bharat Karnad, national security expert
- Bharat Kaul, Indian actor
- Bharat Khanna (1914–1993), Indian cricketer
- Bharat Khawas (born 1992), Nepali footballer
- Bharat Khorani, Indian politician
- Bharat Masrani, Canadian banker
- Bharat Ram Meghwal (born 1956), Indian politician
- Bharat Nalluri (born 1965), British-Indian film and television director
- Bharat Narah, Indian politician
- Bharat Pandya, Indian politician
- Bharat Patankar, Indian activist
- Bharat Patel (born 1952), Zimbabwean judge
- Bharat Popli (born 1990), Indian-born New Zealand cricketer
- Bharat Ram (1914–2007), Indian industrialist
- Bharat Ramamurti, American attorney and political advisor
- Bharat Rangachary Indian film director and producer of Bollywood
- Bharat Ratra (born 1960), Indian-American physicist
- Bharat Singh Rawat, Indian politician
- Bharat Sawad (1968–?), Nepalese weightlifter
- Bharat Shah (cricketer) (1945–2016), Indian cricketer
- Bharat Shah (born 1944), Indian film financier and distributor
- Bharat Kumar Shah, Nepalese politician
- Bharath Shetty Y (born 1971), Indian politician
- Bharat Singh, Indian politician
- Bharat Sitaula, Nepali pop singer-songwriter and record producer
- Bharat Sundar (born 1988), Indian Carnatic singer
- Bharat Swamy, Indian rock musician
- Bharat Tripathi (born 1989), English cricketer
- Bharat Bhushan Tyagi (born 1954), Indian farmer and educator
- Bharat Raj Upreti (1950–2015), justice of the Supreme Court of Nepal
- Bharat Vatwani, Indian psychiatrist
- Bharat Veer (born 1988), Indian cricketer
- Bharat Vyas (1918–1983), Indian lyricist for Hindi films
- Bharat Vir Wanchoo, Indian politician

== See also ==
- Bharathan (1946–1998), Indian film maker
