= Prabhas (disambiguation) =

Prabhas is an Indian actor.

Prabhas may also refer to:

- Prabhas Patan, a locality and site of pilgrimage of the Somnath temple in Veraval, Gujarat, India
- Prabhas Sreenu, Indian actor
- Prabhas Chandra Lahiri, Indian revolutionary
- Prabhas Chandra Tiwari, Indian politician
- Prabhas Kumar Choudhary, Indian writer
- Prabhas Kumar Singh, Indian politician

== See also ==
- Prabha (disambiguation)
- Prabhash Joshi, Indian writer
- Prabhashankar Pattani, Indian politician
