= Billa No. 786 =

2000 Indian film by Imran Khalid

- Promotional Poster
- Directed by: Imran Khalid
- Produced by: Salim Khan, Manisha
- Starring: Mithun Chakraborty
- Music by: Kush-Luv
- Release date: 29 December 2000
- Running time: 120 minutes
- Country: India
- Language: Hindi

Billa No. 786 is a 2000 Indian Hindi-language action drama film directed by Imran Khalid and produced by Salim Khan. The movie was released on 29 December 2000 under the banner of Tirupati Enterprises. Mithun Chakraborty played the lead role.

== Plot ==
Shankar is a coolie at a bus stop. He fights for the down-trodden and stands up against evil forces. Local goon Dhankeshwar has set his eyes on the slum where the coolies live. Shankar fights against the villains.

== Cast ==
- Mithun Chakraborty as Shankar
- Rutika Singh as Pinky Singh
- Gajendra Chouhan as Virendra Singh (Pinky's dad)
- Siddharth Dhawan as Siddhu
- Mohan Joshi as Pyaremohan Dhankeshwar
- Kader Khan Darvesh Baba Sher Khan
- Harish Patel Ibu Hatela
- Shiva Rindani as Kaalu Tagda (as Shiva)
- Tej Sapru as Kaalu Ragda
- Anil Nagrath as Roopchand
- Sudhir as Balwant Rai
- Kavita as Lajjo

== Soundtracks ==
No.	Title	Artist(s)	Length
1.	"Main Hoon Raju Coolie"	Udit Narayan
2.	"Bhar Do Jholi"	Sabri Brothers
3.	"Gorki Patar Ki"	Udit Narayan, Prabha Bharti
4.	"Raat Bhar Nahin Mujhko"	Prabha Bharti
5.	"Karishma Mein Kuchh"	Vinod Rathod, Poornima
6.	"Roopwa Se Chuye"	Sapna Awasthi
