= Bharata =

Bharata (representing either Sanskrit: भरत bharata or भारत bhārata, and occasionally rendered as Bharat or Bharatha in informal contexts) may refer to:

- Bhārata, a name for India
- Bharata (tribe), mentioned in the Rigveda
- Bharata (Mahabharata), a legendary emperor
- Bharata (Ramayana), a Hindu prince, step-brother of Rama
- Bharata (Jainism), a figure in Jain mythology
- Bharata (sage), an ancient Indian sage who authored the Natya Shastra
- Bhārata, a term for descendants of any of the figures listed above
- Paravar or Bharata, a maritime caste in southern India
- Bharata, a genus of leafhoppers in the tribe Cicadellini

== See also ==
- Bharat (disambiguation)
- Bharati (disambiguation)
- Bharti (disambiguation)
- Bhārata Mātā, the national personification of India as a mother goddess
- Bharathan (disambiguation)
- Bharathar, a Tamil caste in Tamil Nadu, India
  - Bharatha people, Bharathar in Sri Lanka
- Mahābhārata, a Sanskrit epic of ancient India
- Baratha (moth), a synonym of genus Mocis
