= Bharati =

Bharati or Bharathi may refer to:

== Hinduism ==
- Bharati, an epithet of the Hindu goddess of knowledge Saraswati
- Bharati, consort of Hindu wind god Vayu

== Given name ==
- Bharathi (Tamil actress) (born 1987), Indian film actress
- Bharathi Vishnuvardhan (born 1950), South Indian actress
- Bharathiraja (born 1941), South Indian filmmaker
- Bharati Braille, a family of braille alphabets used in South Asia

== Surname ==
- Agehananda Bharati (1923–1991), Austrian academic and Hindu monk
- Gopalakrishna Bharati (1811–1896), Tamil poet and composer
- Subramania Bharati (1882–1921), Indian Nationalist poet and revolutionary

== Films ==
- Barati (1954 film), Indian Hindi language film
- Bharathi (1948 film), Indian Kannada language film
- Bharathi (2000 film), Indian Tamil-language film
- Bharati (2006 film), Indian Telugu language film

== Other uses ==
- Bharati (research station), Indian research station in Antarctica
- Bharati script, a constructed script proposed as a common script for Indian languages

== See also ==
- Barati (disambiguation)
- Bharat (disambiguation)
- Bharathi Kannamma (disambiguation)
- Bharti (disambiguation)
