= Richard Simon (priest) =

French priest (1638-1712)

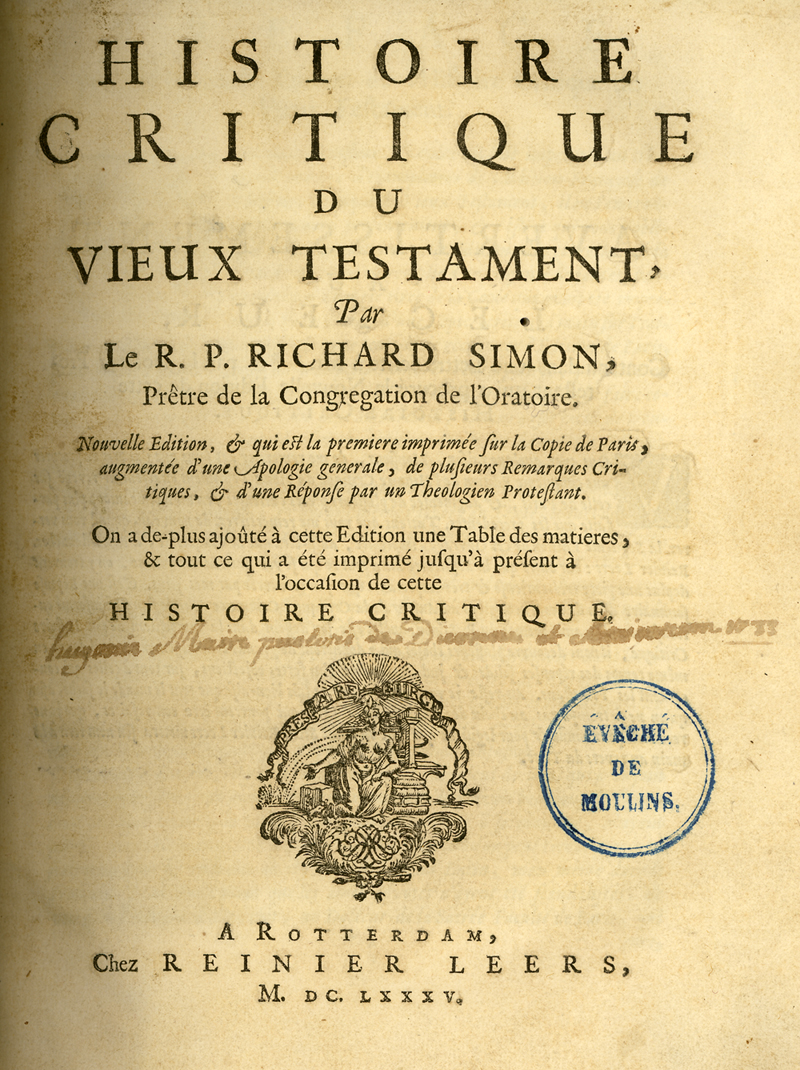
Title page of Simon's "Critical history", 1685.

Richard Simon CO (13 May 1638 – 11 April 1712), was a French priest, a member of the Oratorians, who was an influential biblical critic, orientalist and controversialist.

== Early years ==
Simon was born at Dieppe. His early education took place at the Oratorian college there, and a benefice enabled him to study theology at Paris, where he showed an interest in Hebrew and other Oriental languages. He entered the Oratorians as novice in 1662. At the end of his novitiate he was sent to teach philosophy at the College of Juilly. But he was soon recalled to Paris, and employed in preparing a catalogue of the Oriental books in the library of the Oratory.

== Conflicts as Oratorian ==
Simon was ordained a priest in 1670. He then taught rhetoric at Juilly until 1673, having among his students the noted philosopher, Count Henri de Boulainvilliers.

Simon was influenced by the ideas of Isaac La Peyrère who came to live with the Oratorians (though taking little of the specifics), and by Baruch Spinoza. Simon's approach earned him the later recognition as a "Father of the higher criticism", though this title is also given to German writers of the following century, as well as to Spinoza himself. Simon had a friend who was Jewish and a follower of Sabbatai Zevi, and tried to have La Peyrere talk to him, but he showed no interest.

Simon aroused ill will when he strayed into a legal battle. François Verjus was a fellow Oratorian and friend who was acting against the Benedictines of Fécamp Abbey on behalf of their commendatory abbot, the Prince de Neubourg. Simon composed a strongly worded memorandum, and the monks complained to the Abbé Abel-Louis de Sainte-Marthe, Provost General of the Oratory from 1672. The charge of Jesuitism was also brought against Simon, on the grounds that his friend's brother, Father Antoine Verjus, was a prominent member of the Society of Jesus.

== Suppression of the Histoire critique ==
At the time of the printing of Simon's Histoire critique du Vieux Testament, the work passed the censorship of the University of Paris, and the Chancellor of the Oratory gave his imprimatur. Simon hoped, through the influence of the Jesuit priest, François de la Chaise, the king's confessor, and Charles de Sainte-Maure, duc de Montausier, to be allowed to dedicate the work to King Louis XIV; but the king was absent in Flanders.

The freedom with which Simon expressed himself, especially when he declared that Moses could not be the author of much in the writings attributed to him, gained attention. The influence of Jacques-Benigne Bossuet, at that time tutor to the Dauphin of France, was invoked; the chancellor, Michel le Tellier, lent his assistance. A decree of the Royal Council was obtained, and, after a series of intrigues, the whole printing, consisting of 1,300 copies, was seized by the police and destroyed.

== Later life ==
The Oratory then expelled Simon (1678). He retired in 1679 to the curacy of Bolleville, Seine-Maritime. He later returned to Dieppe, where much of his library was lost in the naval bombardment of 1694. He died there on 11 April 1712, at the age of seventy-four.

== Works ==
Most of what Simon wrote in biblical criticism was not new, given the work of previous critics such as Louis Cappel, Johannes Morinus, and others. The Jesuit tradition of biblical criticism starting with Alfonso Salmeron had paved the way for his approach.

=== Old Testament ===
The Histoire critique du Vieux Testament (1678) consists of three books. The first deals with the text of the Hebrew Bible and the changes which it has undergone, and the authorship of the Mosaic writings and of other books of the Bible. It presents Simon's theory of the existence during early Jewish history of recorders or annalists of the events of each period, whose writings were preserved in the public archives. The second book gives an account of the main translations, ancient and modern, of the Old Testament. The third discusses biblical commentators. The book had a complicated early development. It appeared, with Simon's name on the title page, in the year 1685, from the press of Reinier Leers in Rotterdam. This Dutch edition, in fact the second, superseded the suppressed French first edition, but differed from it in a number of ways. Simon had hoped to overcome the opposition of Bossuet by making changes; these negotiations with Bossuet lasted a considerable time, but finally broke down.

The original French printer of the book, in order to promote sales, had the titles of the chapters printed separately and circulated. These had come into the hands of the Port-Royalists, who had undertaken a translation into French of the Prolegomena to Brian Walton's Polyglott. To counteract this, Simon announced his intention of publishing an annotated edition of the Prolegomena, and added to the Histoire critique a translation of the last four chapters of that work, not part of his original plan. Simon's announcement prevented the appearance of the projected translation.

A faulty edition of the Histoire critique had previously been published at Amsterdam by Daniel Elzevir, based on a manuscript transcription of one of the copies of the original work which had been sent to England; and from which a Latin translation (Historia critica Veteris Testamenti, 1681, by Noël Aubert de Versé) and an English translation (Critical History of the Old Testament, London, 1682) were made. The edition of Leers was a reproduction of the work as first printed, with a new preface, notes, and those other writings which had appeared for and against the work up to that date; it included Simon's answers to criticisms of Charles de Veil and Friedrich Spanheim the Younger.

=== New Testament ===
In 1689 appeared Simon's companion Histoire critique du texte du Nouveau Testament, consisting of thirty-three chapters. In it he discusses: the origin and character of the various books, with a consideration of the objections brought against them by the Jews and others; the quotations from the Old Testament in the New; the inspiration of the New Testament (with a refutation of the opinions of Baruch Spinoza); the Greek dialect in which they are written (against Claudius Salmasius); and the Greek manuscripts known at the time, especially Codex Bezae (Cantabrigiensis).

There followed in 1690 his Histoire critique des versions du Nouveau Testament, where he gives an account of the various translations, both ancient and modern, and discusses the way in which difficult passages of the New Testament have been rendered in the various versions. In 1693 was published the Histoire critique des principaux commentateurs du Nouveau Testament depuis le commencement du Christianisme jusques a notre tems. Nouvelles Observations sur le texte et les versions du Nouveau Testament (Paris, 1695) contains supplementary observations on the subjects of the text and translations of the New Testament.

In 1702 Simon published at Trévoux his own translation into French of the New Testament (the version de Trévoux). It was substantially based on the Latin Vulgate, but was annotated in such a way as to cast doubt on traditional readings that were backed by Church authority. Again Bossuet did what he could to suppress the work. Despite changes over two decades in how Bossuet was able to exert influence through his circle of contacts, he again mobilised against Simon beyond the boundaries of his diocese.

=== Other works ===
As a controversialist, Simon tended to use pseudonyms, and to display bitterness.

Simon was early at odds with the Port-Royalists. Antoine Arnauld had compiled with others a work Perpétuité de la foi (On the Perpetuity of the Faith), the first volume of which dealt with the Eucharist. After François Diroys, who knew both of them, had involved Simon in commenting on the work, Simon's criticisms from 1669 aroused indignation in Arnauld's camp.

Simon's first major publication followed, his Fides Ecclesiae orientalis, seu Gabrielis Metropolitae Philadelphiensis opuscula, cum interpretatione Latina, cum notis (Paris, 1671), on a work of Gabriel Severus (1541–1616), the object of which was to demonstrate that the belief of the Greek Church regarding the Eucharist was the same as that of the Church of Rome. In 1670 he had written a pamphlet in defence of the Jews of Metz, who had been accused of having murdered a Christian child.

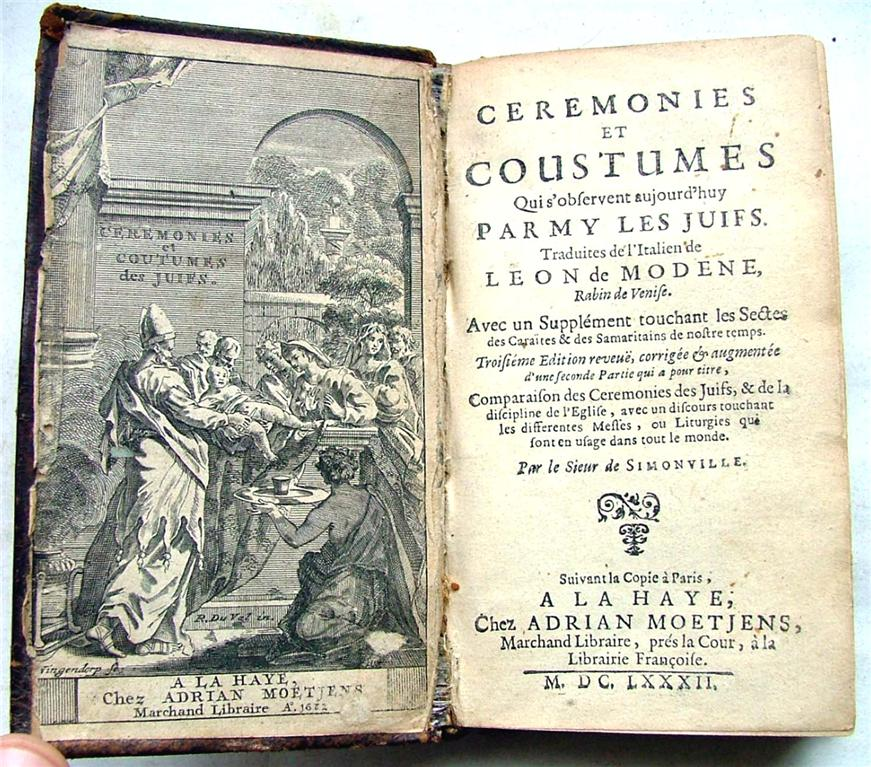
Cérémonies et coutumes parmi les Juifs by Leon of Modena, translated by Simon.

Simon published in 1675 a translation of the travels of Girolamo Dandini in Lebanon, as Voyage au Mont Liban (1675). Dandini was a perceptive observer, and Simon in his preface argued for the utility of travel to theologians.

In 1676 contacts with Huguenots at Charenton led Simon to circulate a manuscript project for a new version of the Bible. This was a sample for a proposed improved edition of the Giovanni Diodati translation; but after Simon had translated the Pentateuch the funding ran out.

=== Reception ===
The Histoire critique du Vieux Testament encountered strong opposition from Catholics who disliked Simon's diminishing of the authority of the Church Fathers. Protestants widely felt that an infallible Bible was threatened by doubts which Simon raised against the integrity of the Hebrew text; and indeed Simon as basic tenets argued against sola scriptura and in favour of the Catholic Church tradition of interpretation. Jean Le Clerc, in his 1685 work Sentimens de quelques théologiens de Hollande, controverted the views of Simon acutely, and claimed that an uninformed reader might take Simon to be any of a Calvinist, Jew or crypto-Spinozan; Bossuet made a point of banning this also, as even more harmful than Simon's book. It was answered in Réponse aux Sentimens de quelques théologiens de Hollande by Simon (1686).

In France, Simon's work became well known and widely circulated, despite Bossuet's hostility and efforts to keep it marginal. Étienne Fourmont was in effect a disciple of Simon, if not acknowledging the fact. Another orientalist influenced by Simon was Nicolas Barat. An important eighteenth century biblical critic in France that did use Simon's work on the Hebrew Bible was Jean Astruc.

The identity of the translator of the 1682 English version Critical History of the Old Testament is unclear, being often given as a Henry Dickinson who is an obscure figure, and sometimes as John Hampden; John Dryden wrote his Religio Laici in response with a dedication to Dickinson, and Simon's work became well known. Isaac Newton took an interest in Simon's New Testament criticism in the early 1690s, pointed out to him by John Locke, adding from it to an Arian summary of his views that was intended for publication by Le Clerc, but remained in manuscript. Later Samuel Clarke published his The Divine Authority of the Holy Scriptures Asserted (1699) in reply to Simon. Simon's works were later an influence on Johann Salomo Semler.

Pope Leo XIII's 1897 catalogue of condemned books contains several works by Richard Simon.

A ... celebrated man was Richard Simon ... whose 'Critical History of the Old Testament' was prohibited in 1682 at the instance of Bossuet, and by that illustrious prelate described as 'a mass of impieties and a rampart of free-thinking (libertinage).' It opens the modern era of Bible studies on scientific principles. Five works of Simon are kept on the condemned list by Leo XIII, including his French translation of the New Testament.

== Bibliography ==
- Factum, servant de responce au livre intitulé Abrégé du procéz fait aux Juifs de Mets, Paris, 1670.
- Histoire critique du Vieux Testament, Paris, 1678; A critical history of the Old Testament (1682), available at archive.org.
- Histoire critique du texte du Nouveau Testament (Rotterdam 1689)
- Histoire critique des versions du Nouveau Testament, ibid., 1690; R. Simon, Critical Enquiries into the Various Editions of the Bible (1684)
- Histoire critique des principaux commentateurs du Nouveau Testament, (Rotterdam, chez Reinier Leers, 1693).
- Nouvelles observations sur le texte et les versions du Nouveau Testament, Paris, 1695.
- Le Nouveau Testament de notre Seigneur Jésus-Christ, traduit sur l’ancienne édition, avec des remarques littérales et critiques sur les principales difficultés, Trévoux, 1702, v. 4.

== Notes ==
Attribution
