= Bharat Vatwani =

Indian psychiatrist

- Occupation: Psychiatrist
- Known for: Rehabilitating mentally ill homeless people
- Awards: Ramon Magsaysay Award (2018)

Bharat Vatwani is an Indian psychiatrist, based in Mumbai, India. He is known for his work in rehabilitating and reuniting mentally ill homeless people with their families. He founded the Shraddha Rehabilitation Foundation, and provides care, treatment, and support to homeless mentally ill people. In recognition of his humanitarian efforts, he was awarded the Ramon Magsaysay Award in 2018.

Vatwani began helping the mentally ill after an encounter with a homeless man drinking from a gutter and reuniting the man with his family. After helping a well-known professor who suffered from schizophrenia, a fundraising campaign was started in order for Vatwani to open a 20-bed rehabilitation centre. In 2006, Vatwani's original rehabilitation centre was moved to Karjat.

Vatwani officially founded the Shraddha Rehabilitation Foundation in 1989. Between 2006 and 2011, the foundation reunited over a thousand people with their families.
