= Kannamma =

Kannamma may refer to:

- Kannamma (film), a 2005 Indian Tamil film
- Kannamma (TV series), a 2015—2016 Indian Tamil television soap opera
- Kannamma (2018 TV series), a 2018 Indian Tamil television series broadcast by Raj TV
- "Kannamma", a song by Santhosh Narayanan, Rita Thyagarajan and Anthony Daasan from the 2014 Indian film Jigarthanda

== See also ==
- Bharathi Kannamma (disambiguation)
- Kannammapet, an area in the city of Chennai, India
