= Bharathi Kannamma (disambiguation) =

Bharathi Kannamma is a 1997 Indian film.

Bharathi Kannamma may also refer to these in Indian television:

- Bharathi Kannamma (2014 TV series)
- Bharathi Kannamma (2019 TV series)
  - Bharathi Kannamma 2

== See also ==
- Bharathi (disambiguation)
- Kannamma (disambiguation)
- Bharathi Kannan, Indian film director and actor
