= Baratti =

Baratti may refer to:

== Places ==
- Baratti, Italy, a village
- Baratti and Populonia Archeological Park, Park in the province of Livorno in Italy

== People ==
- Antonio Baratti, (1724-1787), Italian engraver
- Boris de Rachewiltz (redirect from Boris Baratti), Italian Egyptologist
- Éva Barati (born 1968 in Üröm) is a Hungarian athlete

== See also ==
- Barati (disambiguation)
