= Spinoza's Ethics =

Philosophical treatise written by Spinoza

Ethics, Demonstrated in Geometrical Order
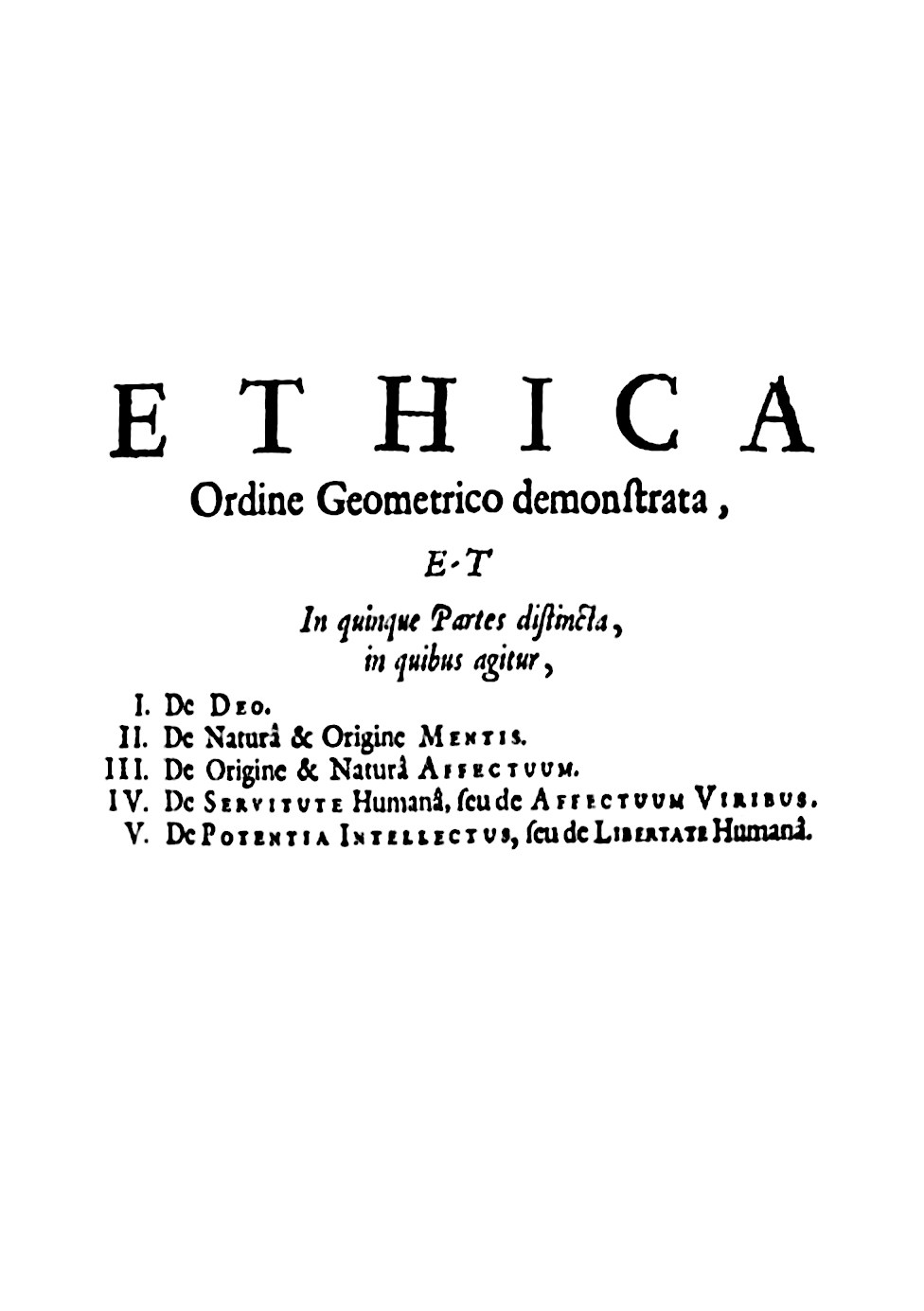
- The opening page of Ethics, in the posthumous Latin first edition
- Author: Baruch Spinoza
- Language: Latin
- Genre: Philosophy
- Publication date: 1677
- Publication place: Dutch Republic
- Original text: Ethics, Demonstrated in Geometrical Order at Latin Wikisource
- Translation: Ethics, Demonstrated in Geometrical Order at Wikisource

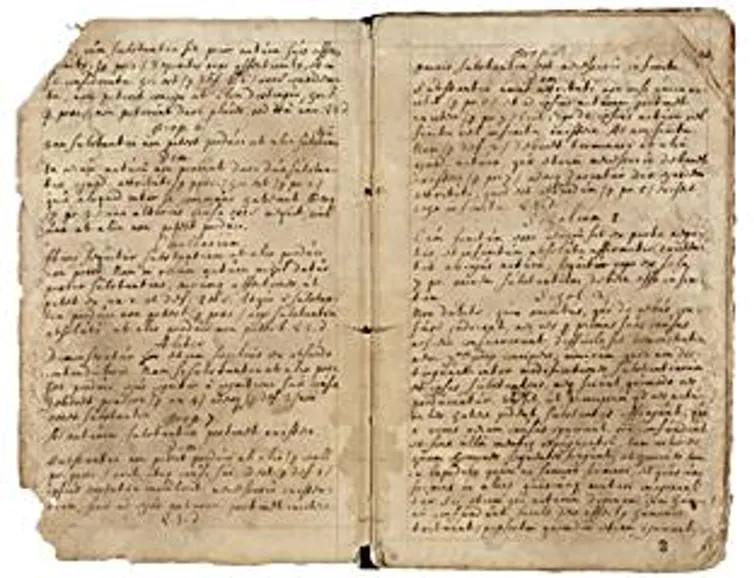
A manuscript of Baruch de Spinoza: Ethica in the Biblioteca Vaticana, Vat. lat. 12838. Part 1, theorems 5 (the ending), 6–8. Prop. = Theorem, Dem. = Proof.

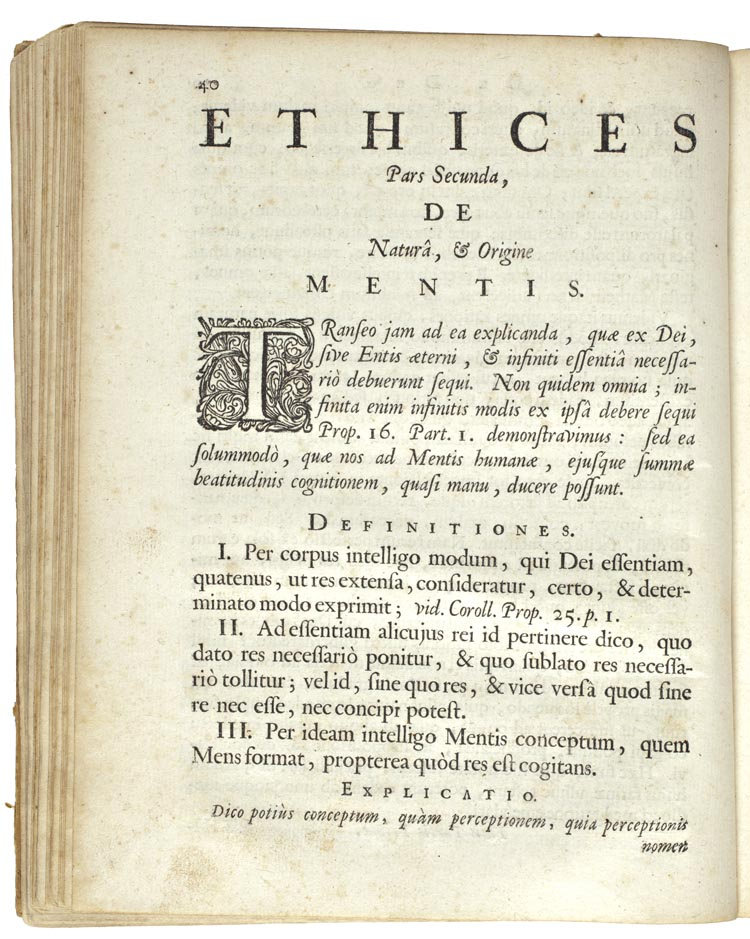
Benedictus de Spinoza: Ethica part 2. Ethices Pars secunda, De Naturâ & Origine mentis, 1677. "On the nature and origin of the Mind"

Ethics, Demonstrated in Geometrical Order (Latin: Ethica, ordine geometrico demonstrata) is a philosophical treatise written in Latin by Baruch Spinoza (Benedictus de Spinoza). It was written between 1661 and 1675 and was first published posthumously in 1677.

The Ethics is perhaps the most ambitious attempt to apply Euclid's method in philosophy, which was referred to as “more geometrico” which in Latin meant “in a geometrical manner”. Spinoza puts forward a small number of definitions and axioms from which he attempts to derive hundreds of propositions and corollaries, such as "when the Mind imagines its own lack of power, it is saddened by it", "a free man thinks of nothing less than of death", and "the human Mind cannot be absolutely destroyed with the Body, but something of it remains which is eternal."

== Summary ==
=== Part I: Of God ===
The first part of the book addresses the relationship between God and the universe. Spinoza was engaging with a tradition that held that God exists outside of the universe, that God created the universe for a reason, and that God could have created a different universe according to his will. Spinoza denies each point. According to Spinoza, God is the natural world. Spinoza concludes that God is the substance comprising the universe; that God exists in itself, not outside of the universe; and that the universe exists as it does from necessity, not because of an anthropomorphic reason or will.

Spinoza argues through propositions. He considers the conclusions he reaches to be the necessary logical result of combining the Definitions and Axioms he provides. He starts with the proposition that "there cannot exist in the universe two or more substances having the same nature or attribute." He then argues that objects and events must not merely be caused if they occur, but that they must be prevented if they do not. If something is non-contradictory, there is no reason that it should not exist. Spinoza builds from these starting ideas. If substance exists it must be infinite, because if it is not infinite another finite substance would have to exist to take up the remaining parts of its finite attributes, something that is impossible according to an earlier proposition. Spinoza then uses the Ontological Argument as the justification for the existence of God and argues that God must possess all attributes infinitely. Since no two things can share attributes, "besides God no substance can be granted or conceived."

As with many of Spinoza's claims, what this means is a matter of dispute. Spinoza claims that the things that make up the universe, including human beings, are God's "modes". This means that everything is, in some sense, dependent upon God. The nature of this dependence is disputed. Some scholars say that the modes are properties of God in the traditional sense. Others say that modes are effects of God. Either way, the modes are also logically dependent on God's essence, in this sense: everything that happens follows from the nature of God, just as it follows from the nature of a triangle that the sum of its angles are equal to two right angles or 180 degrees. Since God had to exist with the nature that he has, nothing that has happened could have been avoided; and, if God has fixed a particular fate for a particular mode, there is no escaping it. As Spinoza puts it, "A thing which has been determined by God to produce an effect cannot render itself undetermined."

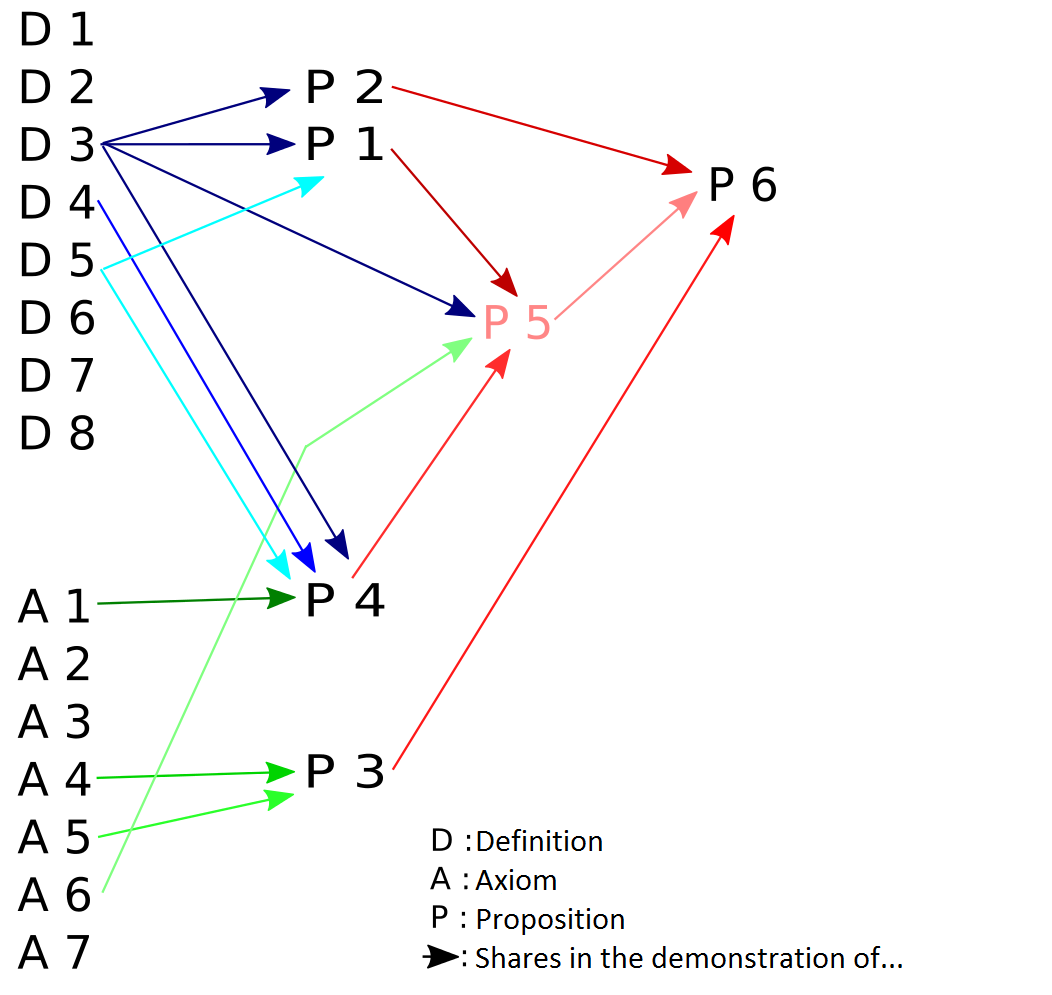
Logical structure of the first six propositions of Spinoza's Ethics

=== Part II: Of the Nature & Origin of the Mind ===
The second part focuses on the human mind and body. Spinoza attacks several Cartesian positions: (1) that the mind and body are distinct substances that can affect each other; (2) that we know our minds better than we know our bodies; (3) that our senses may be trusted; (4) that despite being created by God we can make mistakes, namely, when we affirm, of our own free will, an idea that is not clear and distinct. Spinoza denies each of Descartes's points. Regarding (1), Spinoza argues that the mind and the body are a single thing that is being thought of in two different ways. The whole of nature can be fully described in terms of thoughts or in terms of bodies. However, we cannot mix these two ways of describing things, as Descartes does, and say that the mind affects the body or vice versa. Moreover, the mind's self-knowledge is not fundamental: it cannot know its own thoughts better than it knows the ways in which its body is acted upon by other bodies.

Further, there is no difference between contemplating an idea and thinking that it is true, and there is no freedom of the will at all. Sensory perception, which Spinoza calls "knowledge of the first kind", is entirely inaccurate, since it reflects how our own bodies work more than how things really are. We can also have a kind of accurate knowledge called "knowledge of the second kind", or "reason". This encompasses knowledge of the features common to all things, and includes principles of physics and geometry. We can also have "knowledge of the third kind", or "intuitive knowledge". This is a sort of knowledge that, somehow, relates particular things to the nature of God. While scholars differ in their interpretations of intuitive knowledge; Kristin Primus suggests that "in this 'third kind of cognition,' one immediately understands, given one's understanding of the very being of God, the very being of things."

=== Part III: Of the Origin & Nature of Emotions ===
In the third part of the Ethics, Spinoza argues that all things, including human beings, strive to preserve their perfection of power in being unaffected. Spinoza states that virtue is equal to power (i.e., self-control).

Spinoza explains how this desire ("conatus") underlies the movement and complexity of our emotions and passions (i.e., joy and sadness that are building blocks for all other emotions). Our mind is in certain cases active, and in certain cases passive. In so far as it has adequate ideas it is necessarily active, and in so far as it has inadequate ideas, it is necessarily passive.

==== Definitions of the affects ====
Term affect	Definition affect	Definition / object
Joy	passage from	a lesser to a greater perfection.
Sadness	passage from	a greater to a lesser perfection.
Wonder	an imagination of a thing in which	the mind remains fixed because this singular imagination has no connection with the others.
Disdain	an imagination of a thing which	touches the mind so little that the thing's presence moves the mind to imagining more what is not than what is.
Love	a joy accompanied by	the idea of an external cause.
Hate	a sadness accompanied by	the idea of an external cause.
Inclination	a joy accompanied by	the idea of a thing which is the accidental cause of joy
Aversion	a sadness accompanied by	the idea of something which is the accidental cause of sadness.
Devotion	a love of	one whom we wonder at.
Mockery	a joy born of the fact that	we imagine something we disdain in a thing we hate.
Hope	an inconstant joy born out of	the idea of a future or past thing whose outcome we to some extent doubt.
Fear	an inconstant sadness born of	the idea of a future or past thing whose outcome we to some extent doubt.
Confidence	a joy born of the idea of	a future or past thing, concerning which the cause of doubting has been removed.
Despair	a sadness born of the idea of	a future or past thing concerning which the cause of doubting has been removed.
Gladness	a joy accompanied by the idea of	a past thing which has turned out better than we had hoped.
Remorse	a sadness accompanied by the idea of	a past thing which has turned out worse than we had hoped.
Pity	a sadness accompanied by the idea of	an evil which has happened to another whom we imagine to be like us.
Favor	a love toward	someone who has benefited another.
Indignation	a hate toward	someone who has done evil to another.
Overestimation	out of love	thinking more highly of someone than is just.
Scorn	out of hate	thinking less highly of someone than is just.
Envy	hate insofar as it so affects a human that	they are saddened by another's happiness and, conversely, glad at another's ill fortune.
Compassion	love insofar as it so affects a human that	they are glad at another's good fortune and saddened by another's ill fortune.
Self-esteem	a joy born of the fact that	a human considers itself and its own power of acting.
Humility	a sadness born of the fact that	a human considers its own lack of power and weakness.
Repentance	a sadness accompanied by	the idea of some deed we believe ourselves to have done from a free decision of the mind.
Pride	out of love of oneself	thinking more highly of oneself than is just.
Despondency	out of sadness	thinking less highly of oneself than is just.
Love of esteem	a joy accompanied by the idea of	some action of ours which we imagine that others praise.
Shame	a sadness accompanied by the idea of	some action of ours which we imagine that others blame.
Longing	a desire / appetite / sadness	to possess something which is encouraged by the memory of that thing while concurrently restrained by the memory of other things which exclude the existence of the thing wanted.
Emulation	a desire for a thing which is generated in us because	we imagine that others have the same desire.
Gratitude	a desire / eagerness for love by which	we strive to benefit one who has benefited us from a like affect of love.
Benevolence	a desire to benefit	one whom we pity.
Anger	a desire by which	we are spurred.
Vengeance	a desire by which, from reciprocal hate, we are roused	to do evil to one who, from a like affect, has injured us.
Cruelty	a desire by which someone is roused	to do evil to one whom we love or pity.
Timidity	a desire to avoid	a greater evil, which we fear, by a lesser one.
Daring	a desire by, which	someone is spurred to do something dangerous which one's equals fear to take on themselves.
Cowardice	desire is restrained by timidity in	fear of some evil which most people do not usually fear.
Consternation	one whose desire to avoid an evil is	restrained by wonder at the evil they fear.
Courtesy	a desire to	do what pleases others and not do what displeases oneself.
Ambition	an excessive desire for	esteem.
Gluttony	an immoderate desire for and love of	eating.
Drunkenness	an immoderate desire for and love of	drinking.
Greed	an immoderate desire for and love of	wealth.
Lust	a desire for and love of	joining one body to another.

=== Part IV: Of the Servitude of Humanity, or the Strength of the Emotions ===
The fourth part analyzes human passions, which Spinoza sees as aspects of the mind that direct us outwards to seek what gives pleasure and shun what gives pain. The "bondage" he refers to is domination by these passions or "affects" as he calls them. Spinoza considers how the affects, ungoverned, can torment people and make it impossible for mankind to live in harmony with one another.

=== Part V: Of the Power of the Intellect, or the Liberty of Humanity ===
The fifth part argues that reason can govern the affects in the pursuit of virtue, which for Spinoza is self-preservation: only with the aid of reason can humans distinguish the passions that truly aid virtue from those that are ultimately harmful. By reason, we can see things as they truly are, sub specie aeternitatis, "under the aspect of eternity," and because Spinoza treats God and nature as indistinguishable, by knowing things as they are we improve our knowledge of God. Seeing that all things are determined by nature to be as they are, we can achieve the rational tranquility that best promotes our happiness, and liberate ourselves from being driven by our passions.

== Themes ==
=== God or Nature ===
According to Spinoza, God is Nature and Nature is God (Deus sive Natura). This is his pantheism. In his previous book, Theologico-Political Treatise, Spinoza discussed the inconsistencies that result when God is assumed to have human characteristics. In the third chapter of that book, he stated that the word "God" means the same as the word "Nature". He wrote: "Whether we say ... that all things happen according to the laws of nature, or are ordered by the decree and direction of God, we say the same thing." He later qualified this statement in his letter to Oldenburg by abjuring materialism. Nature, to Spinoza, is a metaphysical substance, not physical matter. In this posthumously published book Ethics, he equated God with nature by writing "God or Nature" four times. "[F]or Spinoza, God or Nature—being one and the same thing—is the whole, infinite, eternal, necessarily existing, active system of the universe within which absolutely everything exists. This is the fundamental principle of the Ethics...."

Spinoza holds that everything that exists is part of nature, and everything in nature follows the same basic laws. In this perspective, human beings are part of nature, and hence they can be explained and understood in the same way as everything else in nature. This aspect of Spinoza's philosophy — his naturalism — was radical for its time, and perhaps even for today. In the preface to Part III of Ethics (relating to emotions), he writes:

Most writers on the emotions and on human conduct seem to be treating rather of matters outside nature than of natural phenomena following nature's general laws. They appear to conceive man to be situated in nature as a kingdom within a kingdom: for they believe that he disturbs rather than follows nature's order, that he has absolute control over his actions, and that he is determined solely by himself. However, my argument is this. Nothing comes to pass in nature, which can be set down to a flaw therein; for nature is always the same, and everywhere one and the same in her efficacy and power of action; that is, nature's laws and ordinances, whereby all things come to pass and change from one form to another, are everywhere and always the same; so that there should be one and the same method of understanding the nature of all things whatsoever, namely, through nature's universal laws and rules.

— Ethics, Part 3

Therefore, Spinoza affirms that the passions of hatred, anger, envy, and so on, considered in themselves, "follow from this same necessity and efficacy of nature; they answer to certain definite causes, through which they are understood, and possess certain properties as worthy of being known as the properties of anything else". Humans are not different in kind from the rest of the natural world; they are part of it.

Spinoza's naturalism can be seen as deriving from his thoroughgoing commitment to the principle of sufficient reason (psr), which is the thesis that everything has an explanation. He articulates the psr in a strong fashion, as he applies it not only to everything that is, but also to everything that is not:

Of everything whatsoever a cause or reason must be assigned, either for its existence, or for its non-existence — e.g. if a triangle exists, a reason or cause must be granted for its existence; if, on the contrary, it does not exist, a cause must also be granted, which prevents it from existing, or annuls its existence.

— Ethics, Part 1, XI (emphasis added)

And to continue with Spinoza's triangle example, here is one claim he makes about God:

From God's supreme power, or infinite nature, an infinite number of things – that is, all things have necessarily flowed forth in an infinite number of ways, or always flow from the same necessity; in the same way as from the nature of a triangle it follows from eternity and for eternity, that its three interior angles are equal to two right angles.

— Ethics, Part 1, XVII

Spinoza rejected the idea of an external Creator suddenly, and apparently capriciously, creating the world at one particular time rather than another, and creating it out of nothing. The solution appeared to him more perplexing than the problem, and rather unscientific in spirit as involving a break in continuity. He preferred to think of reality as self-sufficient in the sense of being constituted entirely by the one necessarily existing substance. This view was simpler; it avoided the impossible conception of creation out of nothing; and it was religiously more satisfying by bringing God and man into closer relationship. Instead of Nature, on the one hand, and a supernatural God, on the other, he posited one world of reality, at once Nature and God, and leaving no room for the supernatural. This so-called naturalism of Spinoza is only distorted if one starts with a crude materialistic idea of Nature and supposes that Spinoza degraded God. The truth is that he raised Nature to the rank of God by conceiving Nature as the fulness of reality, as the One and All. He rejected the specious simplicity obtainable by denying the reality of Matter, or of Mind, or of God. The cosmic system comprehends them all. In fact, God and Nature become identical when each is conceived as the Perfect Self-Existent. This constitutes Spinoza's Pantheism.

=== Structure of reality ===
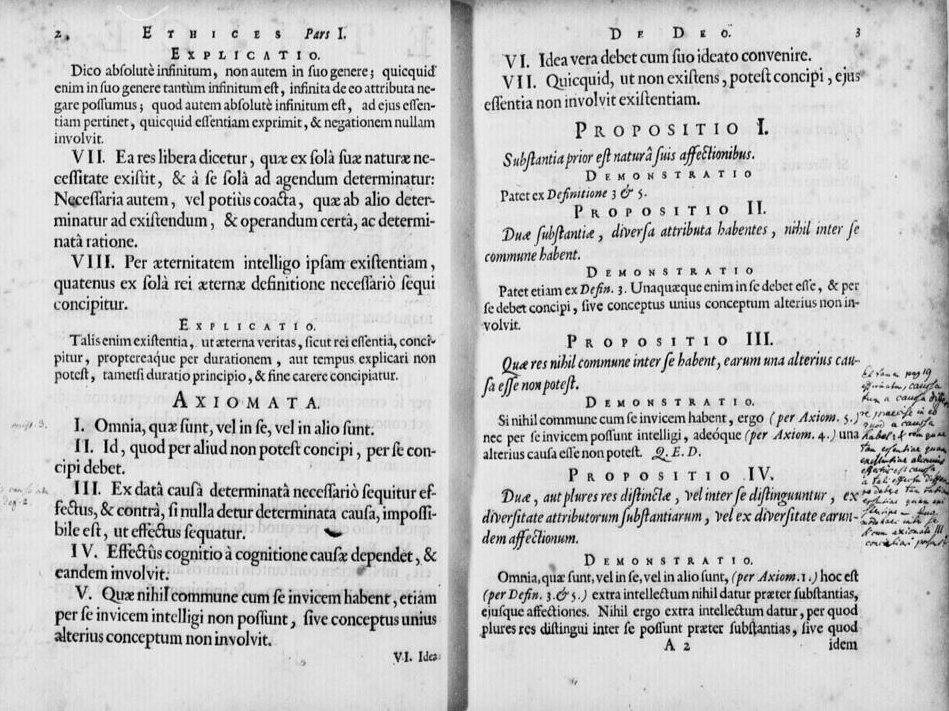
Spinoza's original text of Ethica, Part 1

According to Spinoza, God has "attributes". One attribute is 'extension', another attribute is 'thought', and there are infinitely many such attributes. Since Spinoza holds that to exist is to act, some readers take 'extension' to refer to an activity characteristic of bodies (for example, the active process of taking up space, exercising physical power, or resisting a change of place or shape). They take 'thought' to refer to the activity that is characteristic of minds, namely thinking, the exercise of mental power. Each attribute has modes. All bodies are modes of extension, and all ideas are modes of thought.

==== Substance, attributes, modes ====
Spinoza's ideas relating to the character and structure of reality are expressed by him in terms of substance, attributes, and modes. These terms are very old and familiar, but not in the sense in which Spinoza employs them. To understand Spinoza, it is necessary to lay aside all preconceptions about them, and follow Spinoza closely. Spinoza found it impossible to understand the finite, dependent, transient objects and events of experience without assuming some reality not dependent on anything else but self-existent, not produced by anything else but eternal, not restricted or limited by anything else but infinite. Such an uncaused, self-sustaining reality he called substance. So, for instance, he could not understand the reality of material objects and physical events without assuming the reality of a self-existing, infinite and eternal physical force which expresses itself in all the movements and changes which occur, as we say, in space.

This physical force he called extension, and described it, at first, as a substance, in the sense just explained. Similarly, he could not understand the various dependent, transient mental experiences with which we are familiar without assuming the reality of a self-existing, infinite and eternal consciousness, mental force, or mind-energy, which expresses itself in all these finite experiences of perceiving and understanding, of feeling and striving. This consciousness or mind-energy he called thought, and described it also, at first, as a substance. Each of these "substances" he regarded as infinite of its kind (that is, as exhaustive of all the events of its own kind), and as irreducible to the other, or any other, substance. But in view of the intimate way in which Extension and Thought express themselves conjointly in the life of man, Spinoza considered it necessary to conceive of Extension and Thought not as detached realities, but as constituting one organic whole or system. And in order to express this idea, he then described Extension and Thought as attributes, reserving the term Substance for the system which they constitute between them. This change of description was not intended to deny that Extension and Thought are substances in the sense of being self-existent, etc. It was only intended to express their coherence in one system. The system of course would be more than any one attribute. For each attribute is only infinite of its kind; the system of all attributes is absolutely infinite, that is, exhausts the whole of reality. Spinoza, accordingly, now restricted the term "substance" to the complete system, though he occasionally continued to use the phrase "substance or attribute", or described Extension as a substance.

As commonly used, especially since the time of Locke, the term substance is contrasted with its attributes or qualities as their substratum or bearer. But this meaning must not be read into Spinoza. For Spinoza, Substance is not the support or bearer of the Attributes, but the system of Attributes — he actually uses the expression "Substance or the Attributes." If there is any difference at all between "Substance" and "the Attributes", as Spinoza uses these terms, it is only the difference between the Attributes conceived as an organic system and the Attributes conceived (but not by Spinoza) as a mere sum of detached forces. Something is still necessary to complete the account of Spinoza's conception of Substance. So far only the two Attributes have been considered, namely, Extension and Thought. Spinoza, however, realised that there may be other Attributes, unknown to man. If so, they are part of the one Substance or cosmic system. And using the term "infinite" in the sense of "complete" or "exhaustive", he ascribed to Substance an infinity of Attributes, that is, all the attributes there are, whether known to man or not.

Now reality, for Spinoza, is activity. Substance is incessantly active, each Attribute exercising its kind of energy in all possible ways. Thus the various objects and events of the material world come into being as modes (modifications or states) of the attribute Extension; and the various minds and mental experiences come into being as modes of the attribute Thought (or Consciousness). These modes are not external creations of the Attributes, but immanent results — they are not "thrown off" by the Attributes, but are states (or modifications) of them, as air-waves are states of the air. Each Attribute, however, expresses itself in its finite modes not immediately (or directly) but mediately (or indirectly), at least in the sense to be explained now. Galilean physics tended to regard the whole world of physical phenomena as the result of differences of motion or momentum. And, though erroneously conceived, the Cartesian conception of a constant quantity of motion in the world led Spinoza to conceive of all physical phenomena as so many varying expressions of that store of motion (or motion and rest).

Spinoza might, of course, have identified Extension with energy of motion. But, with his usual caution, he appears to have suspected that motion may be only one of several types of physical energy. So he described motion simply as a mode of Extension, but as an infinite mode (because complete or exhaustive of all finite modes of motion) and as an immediate mode (as a direct expression of Extension). Again, the physical world (or "the face of the world as a whole", as Spinoza calls it) retains a certain sameness in spite of the innumerable changes in detail that are going on. Accordingly, Spinoza described also the physical world as a whole as an infinite mode of extension ("infinite" because exhaustive of all facts and events that can be reduced to motion), but as a mediate (or indirect) mode, because he regarded it as the outcome of the conservation of motion (itself a mode, though an immediate mode). The physical things and events of ordinary experience are finite modes. In essence each of them is part of the Attribute Extension, which is active in each of them. But the finiteness of each of them is due to the fact that it is restrained or hedged in, so to say, by other finite modes. This limitation or determination is negation in the sense that each finite mode is not the whole attribute Extension; it is not the other finite modes. But each mode is positively real and ultimate as part of the Attribute.

In the same kind of way the Attribute Thought exercises its activity in various mental processes, and in such systems of mental process as are called minds or souls. But in this case, as in the case of Extension, Spinoza conceives of the finite modes of Thought as mediated by infinite modes. The immediate infinite mode of Thought he describes as "the idea of God"; the mediate infinite mode he calls "the infinite idea" or "the idea of all things". The other Attributes (if any) must be conceived in an analogous manner. And the whole Universe or Substance is conceived as one dynamic system of which the various Attributes are the several world-lines along which it expresses itself in all the infinite variety of events.

Given the persistent misinterpretation of Spinozism it is worth emphasizing the dynamic character of reality as Spinoza conceived it. The cosmic system is certainly a logical or rational system, according to Spinoza, for Thought is a constitutive part of it; but it is not merely a logical system — it is dynamic as well as logical. His frequent use of geometrical illustrations affords no evidence at all in support of a purely logico-mathematical interpretation of his philosophy; for Spinoza regarded geometrical figures, not in a Platonic or static manner, but as things traced out by moving particles or lines, etc., that is, dynamically.

=== Moral philosophy ===
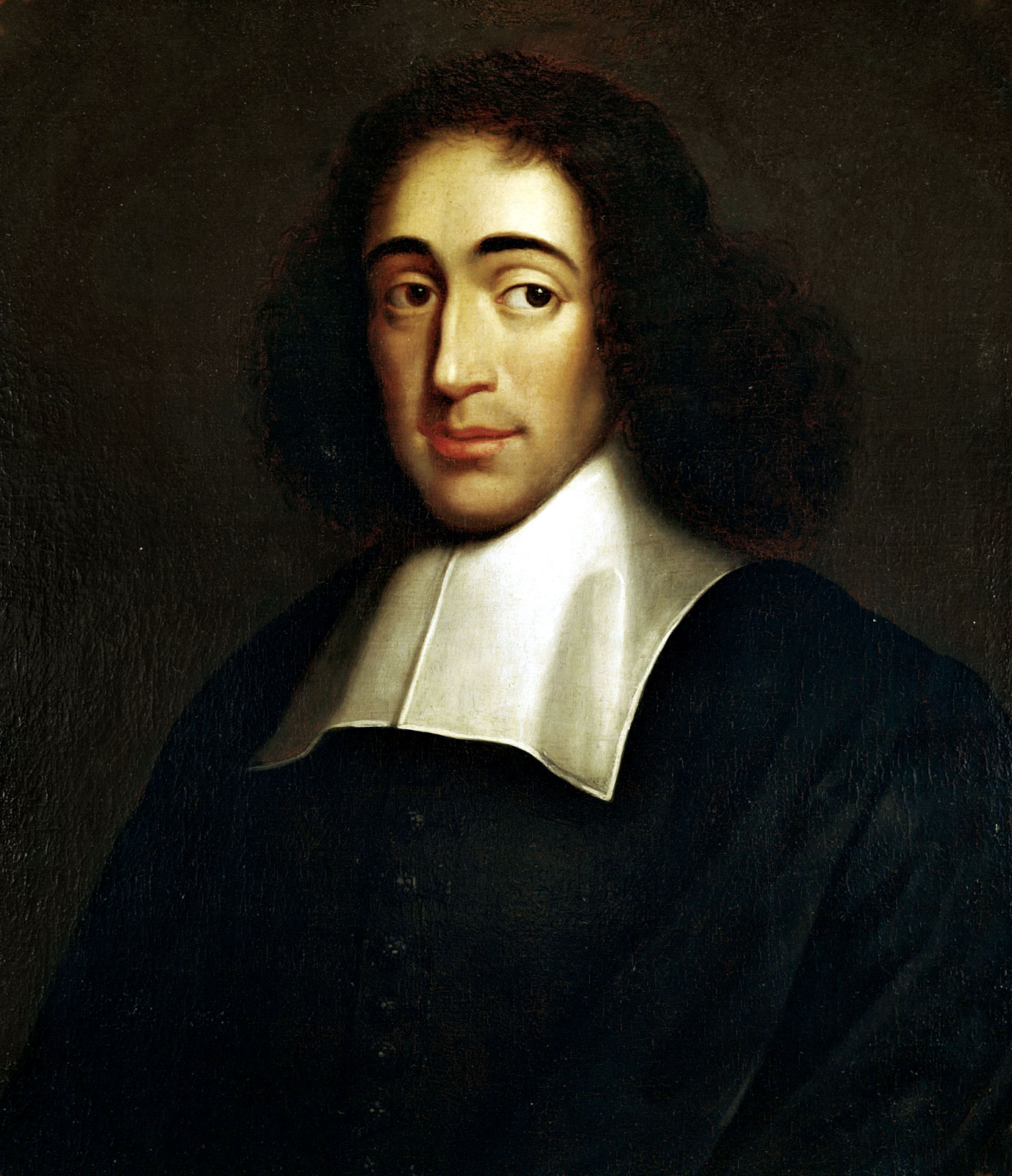
Portrait of Baruch Spinoza, 1665

Without intelligence there is not rational life: and things are only good, in so far as they aid man in his enjoyment of the intellectual life, which is defined by intelligence. Contrariwise, whatsoever things hinder man's perfecting of his reason, and capability to enjoy the rational life, are alone called evil.

— Ethics, Part IV, Appendix V

For Spinoza, reality means activity, and the reality of anything expresses itself in a tendency to self-preservation — to exist is to persist. In the lowest kinds of things, in so-called inanimate matter, this tendency shows itself as a "will to live". Regarded physiologically the effort is called appetite; when we are conscious of it, it is called desire. The moral categories, good and evil, are intimately connected with desire, though not in the way commonly supposed. Man does not desire a thing because he thinks it is good, or shun it because he considers it bad; rather he considers anything good if he desires it, and regards it as bad if he has an aversion for it. Now whatever is felt to heighten vital activity gives pleasure; whatever is felt to lower such activity causes pain. Pleasure coupled with a consciousness of its external cause is called love, and pain coupled with a consciousness of its external cause is called hate — "love" and "hate" being used in the wide sense of "like" and "dislike". All human feelings are derived from pleasure, pain and desire. Their great variety is due to the differences in the kinds of external objects which give rise to them, and to the differences in the inner conditions of the individual experiencing them.

Spinoza gives a detailed analysis of the whole gamut of human feelings, and his account is one of the classics of psychology. For the present purpose the most important distinction is that between "active" feelings and "passive" feelings (or "passions"). Man, according to Spinoza, is active or free in so far as any experience is the outcome solely of his own nature; he is passive, or a bondsman, in so far as any experience is due to other causes besides his own nature. The active feelings are all of them forms of self-realisation, of heightened activity, of strength of mind, and are therefore always pleasurable. It is the passive feelings (or "passions") which are responsible for all the ills of life, for they are induced largely by things outside us and frequently cause that lowered vitality which means pain. Spinoza next links up his ethics with his theory of knowledge, and correlates the moral progress of man with his intellectual progress. At the lowest stage of knowledge, that of "opinion", man is under the dominant influence of things outside himself, and so is in the bondage of the passions. At the next stage, the stage of "reason", the characteristic feature of the human mind, its intelligence, asserts itself, and helps to emancipate him from his bondage to the senses and external allurements. The insight gained into the nature of the passions helps to free man from their domination. A better understanding of his own place in the cosmic system and of the place of all the objects of his likes and dislikes, and his insight into the necessity which rules all things, tend to cure him of his resentments, regrets and disappointments. He grows reconciled to things, and wins peace of mind. In this way reason teaches acquiescence in the universal order, and elevates the mind above the turmoil of passion. At the highest stage of knowledge, that of "intuitive knowledge", the mind apprehends all things as expressions of the eternal cosmos. It sees all things in God, and God in all things. It feels itself as part of the eternal order, identifying its thoughts with cosmic thought and its interests with cosmic interests. Thereby it becomes eternal as one of the eternal ideas in which the Attribute Thought expresses itself, and attains to that "blessedness" which "is not the reward of virtue, but virtue itself", that is, the perfect joy which characterises perfect self-activity. This is not an easy or a common achievement. "But", says Spinoza, "everything excellent is as difficult as it is rare."

== Reception ==
Shortly after his death in 1677, Spinoza's works were placed on the Catholic Church's Index Librorum Prohibitorum. Condemnations soon appeared, such as Aubert de Versé's L'impie convaincu (1685). According to its subtitle, in this work "the foundations of [Spinoza's] atheism are refuted". In June 1678—just over a year after Spinoza's death—the States of Holland banned his entire works, since they "contain very many profane, blasphemous and atheistic propositions". The prohibition included the owning, reading, distribution, copying, and restating of Spinoza's books, and even the reworking of his fundamental ideas.

For the next hundred years, if European philosophers read this so-called heretic, they did so almost entirely in secret. How much forbidden Spinozism they were sneaking into their diets remains a subject of continual intrigue. Locke, Hume, Leibniz and Kant all stand accused by later scholars of indulging in periods of closeted Spinozism. At the close of the 18th century, a controversy centering on the Ethics scandalized the German philosophy scene.

The first known translation of the Ethics into English was completed in 1856 by the novelist George Eliot, though not published until much later. The book next appeared in English in 1883, by the hand of the novelist Hale White. Spinoza rose clearly into view for Anglophone metaphysicians in the late nineteenth century, during the British craze for Hegel. In his admiration for Spinoza, Hegel was joined in this period by his countrymen Schelling, Goethe, Schopenhauer and Nietzsche. In the twentieth century, the ghost of Spinoza continued to show itself, for example in the writings of Russell, Wittgenstein, Davidson, and Deleuze. Among writers of fiction and poetry, the influential thinkers inspired by Spinoza include Clarice Lispector, Coleridge, George Eliot, Melville, Borges, and Malamud.

The first published Dutch translations were by the poet Herman Gorter (1895) and by Willem Meyer (1896).

== Criticism ==
=== Number of attributes ===
Spinoza's contemporary, Simon de Vries, raised the objection that Spinoza fails to prove that substances may possess multiple attributes, but that if substances have only a single attribute, "where there are two different attributes, there are also different substances". This is a serious weakness in Spinoza's logic, which has yet to be conclusively resolved. Some have attempted to resolve this conflict, such as Linda Trompetter, who writes that "attributes are singly essential properties, which together constitute the one essence of a substance", but this interpretation is not universal, and Spinoza did not clarify the issue in his response to de Vries. On the other hand, Stanley Martens states that "an attribute of a substance is that substance; it is that substance insofar as it has a certain nature" in an analysis of Spinoza's ideas of attributes.

=== Misuse of words ===
Schopenhauer claimed that Spinoza misused words. "Thus he calls 'God' that which is everywhere called 'the world'; 'justice' that which is everywhere called 'power'; and 'will' that which is everywhere called 'judgement'." Also, "that concept of substance...with the definition of which Spinoza accordingly begins...appears on close and honest investigation to be a higher yet unjustified abstraction of the concept matter."

== English translations ==
- 1856 by George Eliot, unpublished until 1981 (Institut für Anglistik und Amerikanistik, University of Salzburg, Austria); edited by Thomas Deegan. New edition with an introduction and notes by Clare Carlisle (Princeton University Press, 2020).
- 1870 by Robert Willis, in Benedict de Spinoza: His Life, Correspondence, and Ethics (Trübner & Co., London).
- 1883 by Hale White (Trübner & Co., London). Reissued in the Volume 31 of the Great Books of the Western World series, with selected Descartes' Major Works.
- 1884 by R. H. L. Elwes, in the second volume of The Chief Works of Spinoza (George Bell & Sons, London). Many reprints and editions until today.
- 1910 by Andrew Boyle, with an Introduction by George Santayana (Dens & Sons, London); some reprints since then. Revised by G. H. R. Parkinson and newly edited as a part of the Oxford Philosophical Texts (London, 1989).
- 1982 by Samuel Shirley (Hacket Publications), with Spinoza's selected Letters. Added to his translation of the Complete Works, with introduction and notes by Michael L. Morgan (also Hacket Publications, 2002).
- 1985 by Edwin Curley, in the first volume of The Collected Works of Spinoza (Princeton University Press). Separately reissued by Penguin Classics (2005), and with a selection of the Letters and other texts in A Spinoza Reader (Princeton University Press, 1994).
- 2018 by Michael Silverthorne and Matthew J. Kisner in the Cambridge Texts in History of Philosophy series.

== See also ==
- Natura naturans
- Natura naturata
- Nature connectedness
- Opera Posthuma
- Pantheism
- Philosophy of Spinoza
