= Baratie =

Baratie may refer to:

- a story arc in One Piece, and a restaurant at Fuji Television headquarters
- Andrea and Bartolomé Baratie, involved in the Rancho San Juan Capistrano del Camote murders in 1858

== See also ==
- Bărăţia (disambiguation)
