= Bharathan (disambiguation) =

Bharathan (1947–1998) was an Indian filmmaker, artist, and art director.

Bharathan may also refer to:

- Bharathan (Tamil director), Indian filmmaker and writer
- Bharathan (film), Tamil film starring Vijayakanth and Bhanupriya

== See also ==
- Bharata (disambiguation)
- Bharathan Effect, 2007 Malayalam film starring Biju Menon and Geethu Mohandas
- Bharatham, 1991 Indian Malayalam-language musical drama film by Sibi Malayil
