= Prabhas Kumar Choudhary =

Indian author (1941–1998)

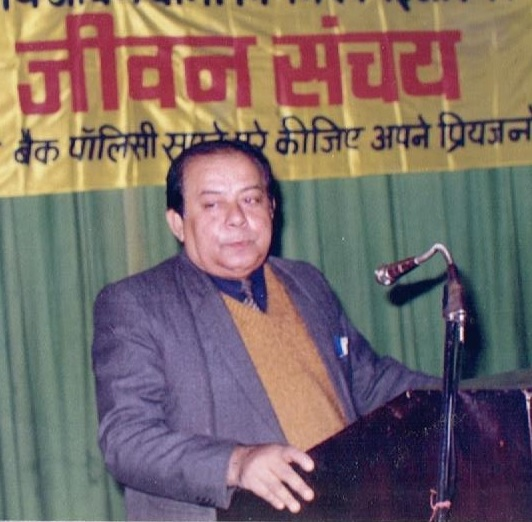
Prabhas Kumar Choudhary Prabhas Kumar Choudhary
- Born: 2 January 1941; Pindaruch, Bihar, British India
- Died: 22 February 1998 (aged 57); Kolkata, West Bengal, India
- Occupations: Writer, editor and publisher
- Writing career
- Period: 20th century

Prabhas Kumar Choudhary (प्रभास कुमार चौधरी, 2 January 1941 – 22 February 1998) was an Indian author, editor and publisher known for his novels and short stories, written in Maithili and Hindi languages. He received the Sahitya Akademi Award for Maithili language in 1990 for Prabhasak Katha, a collection of short stories and authored other books. He also won the Vaidehi Puraskar in 1982 for his book Raja Pokhair Me Katek Machri.

== Life ==
Born in Pindaruch to Shri Surendra Choudhary and Smt. Kali Choudhary in a Zamindar family, he was the eldest of his nine siblings. People used to affectionately call him Hadbad Babu. He came from a modest background. He did his matriculation from M L Academy, Darbhanga and did a double M.A. in Political Science and History from Patna University.

He was married to Smt. Jyotsna Choudhary (1947–1995) and has six children, two brothers and four sisters. He died of a heart attack at the age of fifty-seven in Kolkata, West Bengal.

== Career ==
He joined Life Insurance Corporation of India in 1966 as Assistant Administrative Officer and had risen to the rank of Regional Manager – Marketing (Eastern Zone) at the time of his death.

== Major works ==
- Bahar Ijot Bhitar Dhuan, Mithila Mihir (Magazine), 1961. Maithili.
- Nav Ghar Uthay: Purn Ghar Khasay (Short Stories), 1964. Maithili.
- Abhishapt, Jyotsna Prakashan 1970. Maithili.
- Yugpurush, Jyotsna Prakashan 1971. Maithili.
- Humra Lag Rahab, Maithili Akademi 1977. Maithili.
- Navarambh, 1979. Maithili.
- Raja Pokhair Me Katek Machri, Jyotsna Prakashan 1981. Maithili. (Translated in Hindi by Smt. Vibha Rani) (Won him the Vaidehi Puraskar, 1982)
- Katha Prabhas, Maithili Akademi 1988. Maithili.
- Prabhasak Katha, Jyotsna Prakashan 1989. Maithili.
- Ashtavakrak Shesh Katha, 1997. Maithili.
- Didbal, 2004 (Post Humous) Jyotsna Prakashan. Maithili
- And many other short stories in Hindi published in various magazines.
