= Bharat Sitaula =

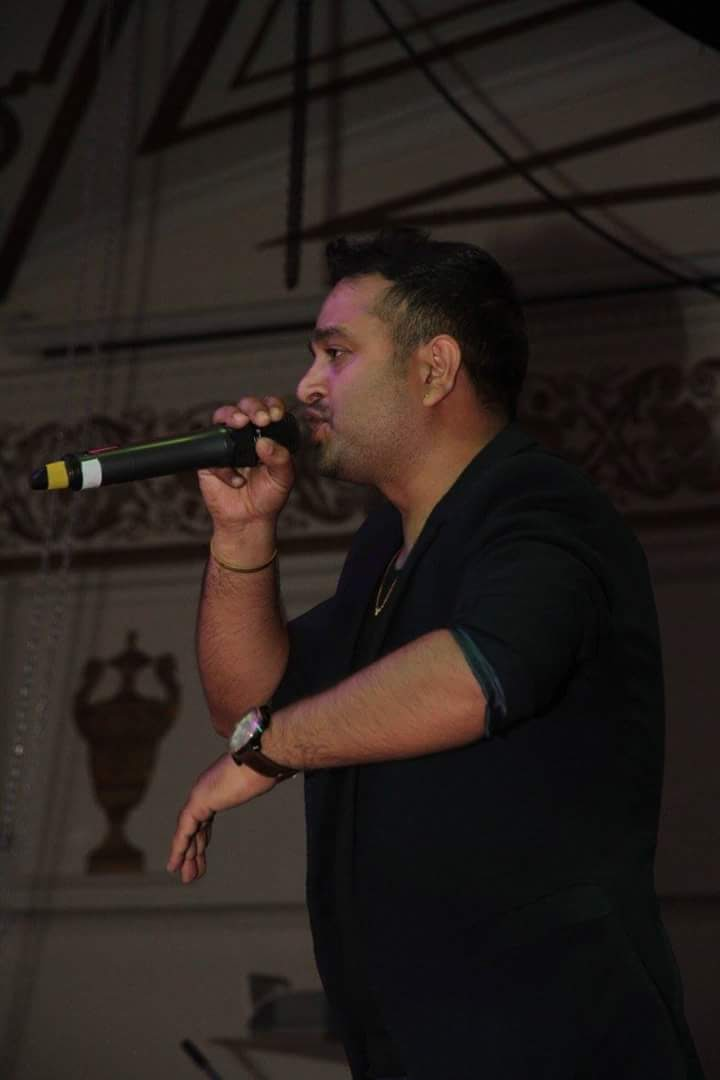
- Sitaula performing in May 2017
- Born: Bharat Kumar Sitaula; Niguradhin, Taplejung, Nepal
- Occupations: Singer, song writer
- Years active: 2001–present
- Musical career
- Genres: Rock, pop, folk rock, folk pop
- Instruments: Vocal; guitar
- Website: http://www.bharatsitaula.com.np/

Bharat Kumar Sitaula (Nepali: भरत कुमार सिटौला) is a Nepali pop singer and songwriter. His debut album was Mod-The turning point in 2005. He has recorded hundreds of songs.

== Career ==
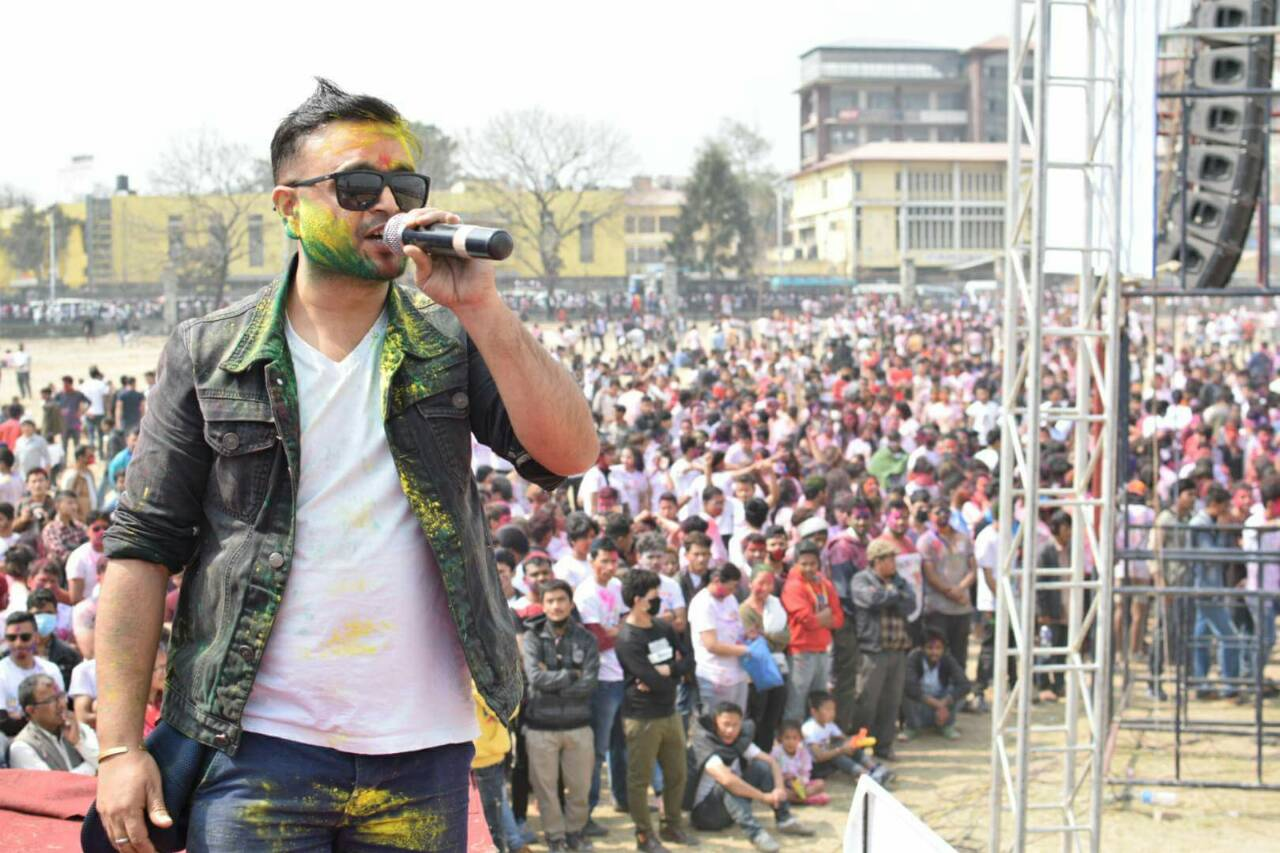
Sitaula performing at Holi concert

Popular Singer Sitaula attended Anurag Music School, Putalisadak, Kathmandu. In 2000, he recorded his song "Oh Bolana". He composed a number of songs for other artists in the following few years, and released his debut album Mod-The Turning Point in the year 2005. The album's songs included "Achanak", which earned him Best New Artist for that year by Hits FM Awards. His second album, Ma Ani Timi, was released in 2006.

As of 2018, he was working on another album Baisama.

== Discography ==
=== Albums ===
- Mod-The Turning Point 2060 B.S
- Ma ani timi 2063 B.S
- Mahima 2066 B.S
- Baisama

== Awards and nominations ==
- Hits F.M Music Award : Best New Artist of the year 2005 A.D (WINNER)
- Kalika F.M Music Award : Best Pop Vocal Male 2073 B.S(WINNER)
- Kalika F.M Music Award : Best Pop Music Composition 2066 B.S (WINNER)
- Hits FM Music Award : Best Pop Vocal Male 2017 (Nominated)
- Hits FM Music Award : Best Pop Vocal Male 2018 (Nominated)
- Image FM Music Award : Best Pop Vocal Male 2017 (Nomination)
- Arina Music Award : Best Pop Vocal Male 2017 (Nomination)
