= Nicolas Barat =

French academic

Nicolas Barat was a French Catholic scholar of Hebrew works, who died in 1706.

== Life ==
Barat was born at Bourges during the first quarter of the seventeenth century; he began his studies at Sens, and continued them in Paris, where he was instructor in the Mazarin College. There he came under the influence of Richard Simon, the Orientalist and Biblical scholar.

Barat died in 1706 at Paris.

== Works ==
Most of Barat's published work was done in collaboration with other scholars. With Charles Bordes he edited the posthumous work of Louis Thomassin, Glossarium universale hebraicum (Paris, 1697), and aided Jean-Baptiste Duhamel in the publication of his Bible (Paris, 1706). At the time of his death he was engaged on a French translation of Schabtai's Rabbinical Library. His critical opinions, and much information that he had acquired, were published posthumously under the title, Nouvelle bibliothèque choisie (Amsterdam, 1714, 2 vols.)
