= Bărăția =

Bărăția may refer to:

- Bucharest Bărăția, a church in Romania
- Câmpulung-Muscel Bărăţia, a Catholic Church in Romania

== See also ==
- Baratia, a genus of bush crickets
