= Bharati script =

Proposed common script for Indian languages

Bharati script Bhārati Lipi
- Bhārati Lipi Varnamala (Abugida Chart) divided into 18 vowels (swar), 50 consonants (vyanjan), 17 vowel diacitics (mātrā), 4 special diacritics and 2 punctuation marks.
- Script type: Abugida
- Creator: Research team led by Srinivasa Chakravathy
- Direction: Left-to-right
- Language: Multiple Indian languages

Related scripts
- Parent systems: Devanagari, Latin, Tamil, Telugu, Kannada, Malayalam, Bengali-Assamese: Bharati script

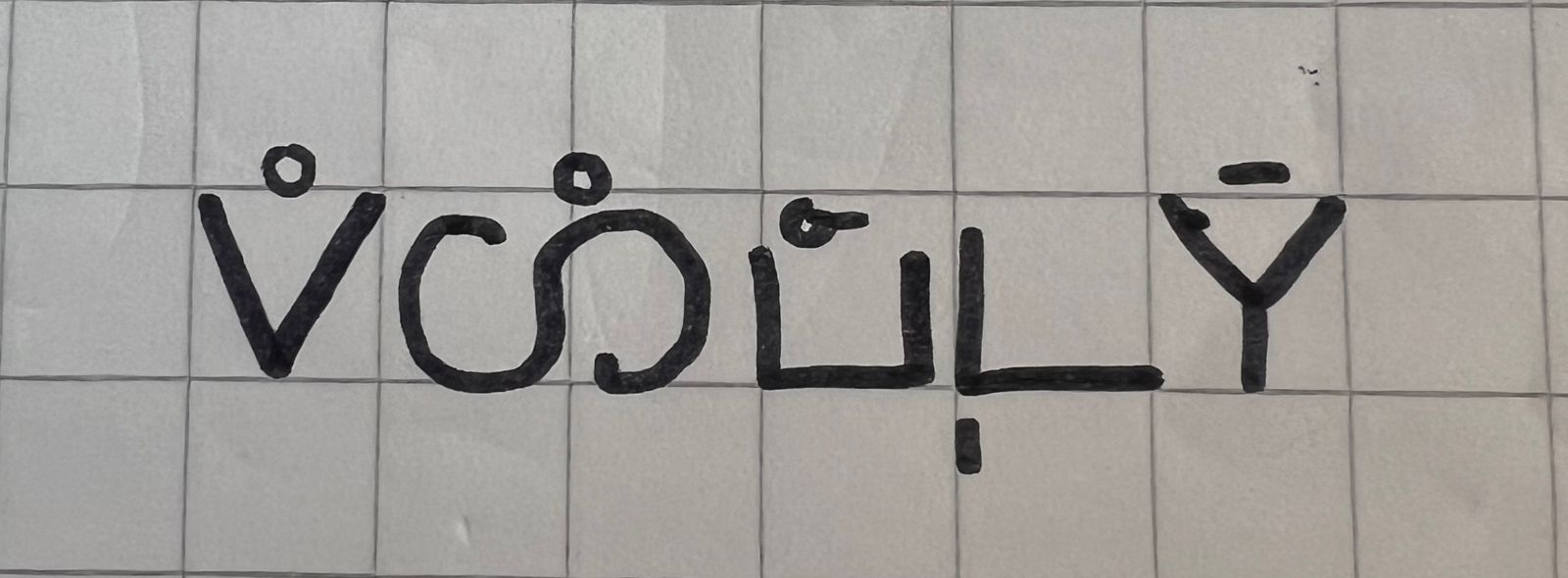
"Wikipedia" in Bharati script

The Bharati (ISO: Bhārati) script is a constructed script created by a research team led by V. Srinivasa Chakravarthy at IIT Madras. It is designed to serve as a common script or link script for Indian languages. It is a left-to-right abugida in which the vowel diacritics may be placed below, upon, or to the right of the primary character.

The script borrows characters and concepts from multiple scripts including the Latin script, Devanagari, Tamil script, Telugu script, Kannada script, Malayalam script, and the Bengali–Assamese script. Like the Gujarati script, it does not feature a running horizontal line above the characters, which is a characteristic of the Devanagari and Bengali-Assamese scripts.

== Development ==
Bharati is proposed to be a common script or link script of Indian languages, including both Indo-Aryan and Dravidian language families, much as the Latin script serves as a common script for many European languages.

It may also serve the purpose of providing a written means for tribal languages that do not have a writing system.

V. Srinivasa Chakravarthy started this project at IIT Madras and a research team led by him developed it.

== Input and fonts ==
"Bhārati" written in the Bharati script

The Bharati script is supported on all operating systems using fonts created by the Bharati team, namely NavBharati and SundarBharati, which transliterate characters of supported scripts into their Bharati equivalents.

NavBharati is a TrueType sans-serif font which supports transliteration of the Devanagari, Tamil, Telugu and Malayalam scripts. SundarBharati is an OpenType serif font which supports transliteration of all of the scripts supported by NavBharati, in addition to the Bengali-Assamese script.

Three Android apps are also offered, which can output text in chosen scripts using a Bharati-based keyboard and handwriting, and transliterate other scripts into Bharati.

An OCR system for the script has also been developed. It is yet to be added to Unicode.

== Mudra Bharati ==
A finger-spelling system is proposed alongside the Bharati script named Mudra Bharati, for use as a sign language.

Unlike the American Sign Language convention, Mudra Bharati utilises two hands.

A prototype has been developed using self-organizing maps and convolutional neural networks, which can give out characters in Devanagari and Tamil scripts after recognition from Mudra Bharati.

== See also ==
- Brahmi script
