= Shraddha Rehabilitation Foundation =

Shraddha Rehabilitation Foundation is Non-profit organisation established by Dr Bharat Vatwani, a Mumbai-based Psychiatrist, in 1988. Based in Karjat, Maharashtra, the foundation aims to find, restore and reunite, the mentally ill destitutes back with their families.

== History ==
In 1988, the psychiatrists Dr Bharat vatwani and Smitha Vatwani decided to start a Rehabilitation home for mentally ill destitutes wandering on the streets. As Bharat quoted in a newspaper article,"I was so moved by the plight of this boy that I decided to take care of him. After treating the boy, I was shocked to learn of his identity. He was a BSc graduate with a diploma in medical laboratory technology and his father was a superintendent in Andhra Pradesh".

== Work ==
So far more than 8000 destitutes have been reunited since the inception of the organisation. The foundation joins hands with various individuals and Corporates such as ValueLabs to achieve the goal.
