= Barat Academy =

Closed school in Chesterfield, Missouri, United States

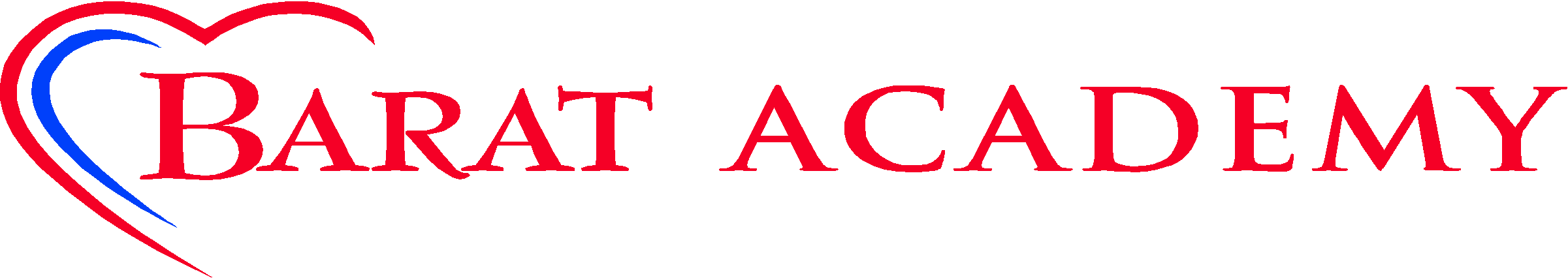

Location
- 17815 Wild Horse Creek Rd; Chesterfield, Missouri 63005; United States; 38°39′13″N 90°38′35″W

Information
- Type: Private, Coeducational
- Religious affiliation: Roman Catholic
- Established: 2007
- Closed: 2025
- Head of school: Debby Watson
- Grades: 6–12
- Colors: Red and white
- Song: Coeur de Jesus
- Nickname: Eagles
- Accreditation: North Central Association of Colleges and Schools

Barat Academy was an independent, co-educational, Catholic, college-preparatory school in St. Louis County, Missouri. Founded in 2007, it served students from grades six to twelve and followed the educational traditions of the Society of the Sacred Heart. The school was originally located in Dardenne Prairie before moving to Chesterfield in 2011. In-school instruction ceased in 2023, and the school closed in 2025.

== History ==
Barat Academy opened with a class of freshmen in 2007, and added the tenth, eleventh and twelfth grades over the following three years. It graduated its first class in May 2011. It was founded in the traditions of the Sacred Heart, and named after Madeleine Sophie Barat, founder of the Society of the Sacred Heart. An anonymous gift of about $1.65 million in 2007 covered tuition for the school's inaugural class of 150 students.

Barat Academy opened in 2007, located in Dardenne Prairie. The school relocated to Chesterfield in 2011 due to financial problems after the 2008 financial crisis. This relocation resulted in a decline in enrollment, dropping from 250 to 210 students.

During the 2009–2010 school year, Barat had 181 students from the ninth grade to eleventh. That increased to 250 students for the 2010–2011 school year as Barat added a twelfth grade. The relocation caused Barat Academy to lose about 40 students.

The school was sued for eviction in 2022 by the Midland States Bank.

In April 2023, the school announced a pause in its in-person instruction for the 2023–2024 academic year, affecting 20 local students, as it planned to vacate its leased facilities in June. This decision followed a lawsuit filed by its landlord, Midland States Bank, seeking eviction due to the school's financial struggles.

== Athletics ==
In 2013, the Barat Academy Boys Golf Team won the Missouri Class 1 Boys Golf State Championship. Team members achieved top individual placements during these tournaments.

In 2014, the Barat Academy Boys Golf Team won the Missouri Class 1 Boys Golf State Championship for the second consecutive year.
