= Barad (band) =

- Origin: Tehran, Iran
- Genres: Folk rock
- Years active: 2003–2005
- Labels: Hermes Records
- Members: Kasra Saboktakin; Pouya Mahmoodi; Aydin Naeeni; Arash Moghadam

Barad (Persian: باراد) were an Iranian rock band from Tehran. The main language for their lyrics is Persian, although English has appeared in their lyrics as well.

== History ==
In 2002, bass player Kasra Saboktakin, singer and guitar player Pouya Mahmoodi, drummer Arash Moghadam and guitar player Aydin Naeeni began to jam together at Naeeni's house.

In early 2003 the record label Hermes Records was introduced to Kasra through a friend, and the label showed interest in the band's Ideas. After they heard their first couple of demos for "Leyva“ and " Dar Har Rag E Man", they signed the band. Later In 2003, their debut album, "Barad“, was released, which had very good reviews and successful sales in Iran and was selected as one of the top 10 albums of the year. In January 2004, they played at a charity event for the victims of 2003 Bam earthquake. Their song „Dar Har Rage Man (Within Each of My Veins)“ in 2006 appeared on the „Rough Guide to the Music of Iran“ compilation. Barad has disbanded around 2005.

== Discography ==
- Barad (2003, Hermes Records)
