= Noel Aubert de Versé =

French writer (1898–1995)

Noel Aubert de Versé (c. 1642/45 in Le Mans – 1714) was a French advocate of religious toleration, whose own religious position oscillated between Unitarian Protestantism and an Oratorian-influenced Catholicism.

== Life ==
Raised a Catholic, Aubert de Versé took a medical degree in Paris but converted to Protestantism in 1662, and studied at the Protestant Academy of Sedan to become a minister in the Dutch Republic. Ejected from the ministry in 1668/9 as a suspected Socinian, he reverted to Catholicism in 1670 and practiced medicine. After the Edict of Fontainebleau, he turned away from Catholicism, but was accused of anti-Trinitarianism and attacked by supporters of Pierre Jurieu. In 1682 he undertook an abortive mission to England in order to establish political links with the Moroccan ambassador, After moving to Hamburg and Danzig, and another visit to England in 1689, he was allowed to return to Paris on condition that he return to Catholicism and write against Socinianism. He translated Richard Simon's critical history of the Old Testament into Latin, and wrote controversial works against both Spinoza and Jurieu.

== Works ==
- Le protestant pacifique; ou, Traité de la paix de l'eglise : dans lequel on fait voir par les principes des Réformez, que la foy de l'Église Catholique ne choque point les fondements de salut: et qu'ils doivent tolerer dans leur Communion tous les Chrêtiens du monde, les Sociniens & les Quakres même, dont on explique la religion contre Monsieur Jurieu, 1684
- L'impie convaincu, ou Dissertation contre Spinosa. Dans laquelle l'on réfute les fondemens de son atheisme. L'on trouvera dans cét ouvrage non seulement la réfutation des maximes impies de Spinosa, mais aussi celle des principales hypotheses du Cartesianisme, que l'on fait voir être l'origine du Spinosisme, 1685
- L'Avocat des protestans, ou Traité du schisme, dans lequel on justifie la separation des Protestans d'avec l'Eglise romaine, contre les objections des sieurs Nicole, Brueys & Ferrand, 1686
- Le tombeau du socinianisme : auquel on a ajouté Le nouveau visionnaire de Rotterdam &c, 1687
- Manifeste de Maître Noël Aubert de Versé ... contre l'auteur anonyme d'un libelle diffamatoire, intitulé Factum, pour demander justice aux Puissances contre le nommé Noël Aubert, dit de Versé, atteint & convaincu des crimes d’impureté, d’impieté & de blasphême, 1687. Digitized Copy, E-Book of Saxon State Library (eBooks on Demand)
- Traité de la liberté de la conscience, ou de l'autorité des souverains dur la religion des peuples opposé aux maximes impies de Hobbes et de Spinosa adoptée par le sier Jurieu, 1687
- L'Anti-socinien ou Nouvelle apologie de la foi catholique, contre les calvinistes, &c., 1692
