= Barad (name) =

Barad can refer to a number of people, places, and things. It occurs as a family name with multiple ethnic sources and meanings (Hebrew: ברד, Russian: Барад). It was ranked # 88,149 in popularity in the 1990 US census. Variants of the surname include: Barada, Barade, Baradi, Baradt, Barat, Bard, Brar, Beirad, Barrett, Albarado, and Al-Barad'i.

- Barad is a Jewish Ashkenazic name derived from the Hebrew patronymic phrase Ben Rabi David "son of Rabbi David".Z
- Barad is a Jewish Sephardic name of unknown origin.
- Barada is an Arabic toponymic name, from a place name meaning cold (for example, the Barada River in Syria).

== People ==
A partial list of people named Barad or a variant thereof:

- Jashubhai Dhanabhai Barad, member of the 14th Lok Sabha (parliament) of India.
- Jill Barad, former CEO of Mattel Inc.
- Karen Barad, feminist philosopher and theoretical physicist.
