= Prabha Bharti =

- Died: 2000s
- Occupations: qawaali and ghazal singer
- Years active: 1960s–1990s
- Formerly of: Prabha Bharti & party

Prabha Bharti (died 2000s) was a noted Indian qawaali and ghazal singer of the 1960s to the 1990s. She was one of the first women qawwali-singer (qawwal) of India, a form of Sufi devotional music traditionally a reserve of male singers. She is known for her album, "Rang-e-Qawwali" (1978), which features qawaalis, "Chhaap Tilak" and "Mai Ni Mai", besides album, "Prabha Bharti Ghazal & Qawali" with music by Kesar Singh Narula released by His Master's Voice.

== Career ==
When she started her career, she found herself being "taken in more as a prop", however subsequently the trend of female qawwals became popular. Later filmi qawwali in Bollywood started depicting the battle of sexes, wherein male and female qawwal competed against each other. Born in a Hindu family, she was a sought after singer in Sufi circles, and performed at commercial as well as private venues and shrines.

At the peak of her career in the 1970s and 1980s, he was a leading qawwal in states of Delhi, Uttar Pradesh and large cities. She won many qawwali competitions against male qawwals, including Ustad Chhote Ussaf, Nazir Bharati, Afzal Iqbal, and Imam Khan. She even organized concerts to raise funds for Indian Army soldiers during the 1971 Indo-Pak War. In 1980, as a part of Indian Republic day celebrations, the Indian Council for Public Relation sponsored a series of her performances along with her "party" (group) in Middle-Eastern countries like Dubai, Kuwait, Damascus, Abu Dhabi and Muscat.

She was also performed a few song as a Bollywood playback singer, she flourished during the 1970s and 1980s and remained active till the 1990s. She lived in Andheri, Mumbai, and died in the late 2000s.
