= Vettius Agorius Praetextatus =

Roman aristocrat and politician

Vettius Agorius Praetextatus (c. 315 – 384) was a wealthy pagan aristocrat in the 4th-century Roman Empire, and a high priest in the cults of numerous gods. He served as the praetorian prefect at the court of Emperor Valentinian II in 384 until his death that same year.

== Sources ==
His life is primarily known through the works of Quintus Aurelius Symmachus and Ammianus Marcellinus, supplemented by some epigraphical records.

Symmachus (c. 345 – c. 402) was a leading member of the senatorial aristocracy of his time and the best orator of his age. Symmachus' letters, speeches and relations have been preserved and testify a sincere friendship between Symmachus and Praetextatus: according to Symmachus, Praetextatus was a good magistrate and a virtuous man.

Ammianus Marcellinus, writing in the early 390s, tells about Praetextatus in three passages of his Res Gestae: in all of them Ammianus shows appreciation of Praetextatus' actions, while the same author is usually critical about the members of the Senate; for this reason some historians think Ammianus and Praetextatus knew each other.

Several inscriptions referring to Praetextatus have been preserved, and among them the most important is the one on the funerary monument to Praetextatus and his wife Aconia Fabia Paulina; other information is provided in some laws addressed to Praetextatus as praefectus urbi and praetorian prefect, and preserved in the Theodosian Code; in addition, there are some letters addressed to him by Emperor Valentinian III about a religious dispute and preserved in the Collectio Avellana.

Jerome (347–420), a Christian writer and theologian, knew the Roman aristocracy through his acquaintances among the Roman matrons. He wrote about Praetextatus in two letters and in his polemic Contra Ioannem Hierosolymitanum (397); the sorrow caused by the death of Praetextatus was so diffused among his acquaintances that Jerome wrote a letter to a matron in which he wrote that Praetextatus was in hell.

A different kind of source is represented by the philosopher and writer Macrobius Ambrosius Theodosius, who made Praetextatus the main character of his Saturnalia, a book describing the pagan renaissance of the late 4th century. However the Saturnalia was written half a century after Praetextatus' death, so his description is highly idealised.

Finally, two later historians wrote about Praetextatus. The first is Zosimus, a pagan historian who lived in the first half of the 6th century and author of the Historia Nova, who described Praetextatus as a defender of the Hellenic cults in Greece; the second historian is Joannes Laurentius Lydus, who lived in the second half of the 6th century, and who talks about a hierophant named Praetextatus, but this identification is uncertain.

== Biography ==
=== Early life ===
Praetextatus' birthday is unknown, but the sources show he was born before Quintus Aurelius Symmachus and Virius Nicomachus Flavianus. They also state that in 384, the year of his death, Praetextatus had been married to his wife Aconia Fabia Paulina for forty years; if Paulina was his first wife and if they married when he was twenty/twenty-five years old, as was customary among the senatorial aristocracy, his birth can be assumed between 314 and 319. According to Joannes Lydus, however, a "Praetextatus the hierophant" and the Neo-platonic philosopher Sopater of Apamea participated to the polismós ceremony during the foundation of Constantinople, around 330. As aristocrats took sacerdotal roles very young, it is possible that this Praetextatus was Vettius Agorius, who actually was Pontifex Vestae; in this case, he would have been born between 310 and 324.

As regards Praetextatus' family, sources are silent and only hypotheses can be drawn. Gaius Vettius Cossinus Rufinus (Praefectus urbi of Rome in 315–316) could have been his father, both because of their names and because they followed a similar career (corrector Tusciae et Umbriae, proconsul Achaiae, pontifex Solis and augur): in the senatorial aristocracy, the sons often held the same political, administrative and religious positions as their fathers. However, many years separated their careers (Praetextatus was praefectus urbi in 367), so it has been proposed that Cossinus Rufinus was the father of Vettius Rufinus (consul in 323) and the latter was Praetextatus' father.

Nonetheless, we know that Praetextatus' family was ancient and noble, and therefore he possessed a network of relationships with other members of the senatorial aristocracy, a network that was used also to gain advantages. His acquaintances included Quintus Aurelius Symmachus, his father Lucius Aurelius Avianius Symmachus, Virius Nicomachus Flavianus and probably the senators Volusius Venustus and Minervius. An example of this network of relationships is the very wedding between Praetextatus and his wife Aconia Fabia Paulina, celebrated around 344 (they had been married for 40 years in 384); Paulina, in fact, was the daughter of Aconius Catullinus Philomatius, Praefectus urbi in 342–344 and Consul in 349. They had at least one son, recalled in the funeral eulogy and the author of an inscription in honour of his father, dated to shortly after his death and found in their home on the Aventine. Even if most historians identify the commissioner of the inscription with a son, this could be also a daughter, maybe the Praetextata cited by Jerome. Finally, Vettius Agorius Basilius Mavortius, consul in 527 and with a similar interest in literature, could have been his great-grandson.

=== Political and religious career ===
The tomb of Praetextatus and of his wife Aconia Fabia Paulina, conserved at the Musei Capitolini, records his cursus honorum.

Praetextatus held several religious positions: pontifex of Vesta and Sol, augur, tauroboliatus, curialis of Hercules, neocorus, hierophant, priest of Liber and of the Eleusinian Mysteries. He also held several political and administrative positions: he was quaestor, corrector Tusciae et Umbriae, Governor of Lusitania, Proconsul of Achaea, praefectus urbi in 384 and was praetorian prefect of Italy and Illyricum, as well as consul designated for the year 385, an honour he did not achieve because he died in late 384.

In 370, several senators were tried for alleged magic practices by prefect Maximinus; Praetextatus led a senatorial legation to emperor Valentinian I, including Volusius Venustus and Minervius, charged with asking Valentinian to forgo torture for those senators involved in trials; the three of them were allowed in the presence of the Emperor, who denied having given such a disposition, but, thanks to the influence of the quaestor Eupraxius, the rights of the senators were restored.

While holding the office of praefectus urbi, he gave back to the Bishop of Rome, Damasus, the basilica of Sicininus and had the other bishop, Ursicinus, expelled from Rome, thus restoring peace in the city, even if he granted an amnesty to the followers of the defeated bishop. His justice was celebrated; he had removed those private structures that were built against pagan temples (the so-called maeniana) and distributed within the whole city uniform and verified weights and measures. He also restored the Porticus Deorum Consentium in the Roman Forum.

After his death, the Emperor asked the Roman Senate for a copy of all his speeches, while the Vestal Virgins proposed to the Emperor that they be allowed to erect statues in his honour.

=== Support of traditional Roman religion ===
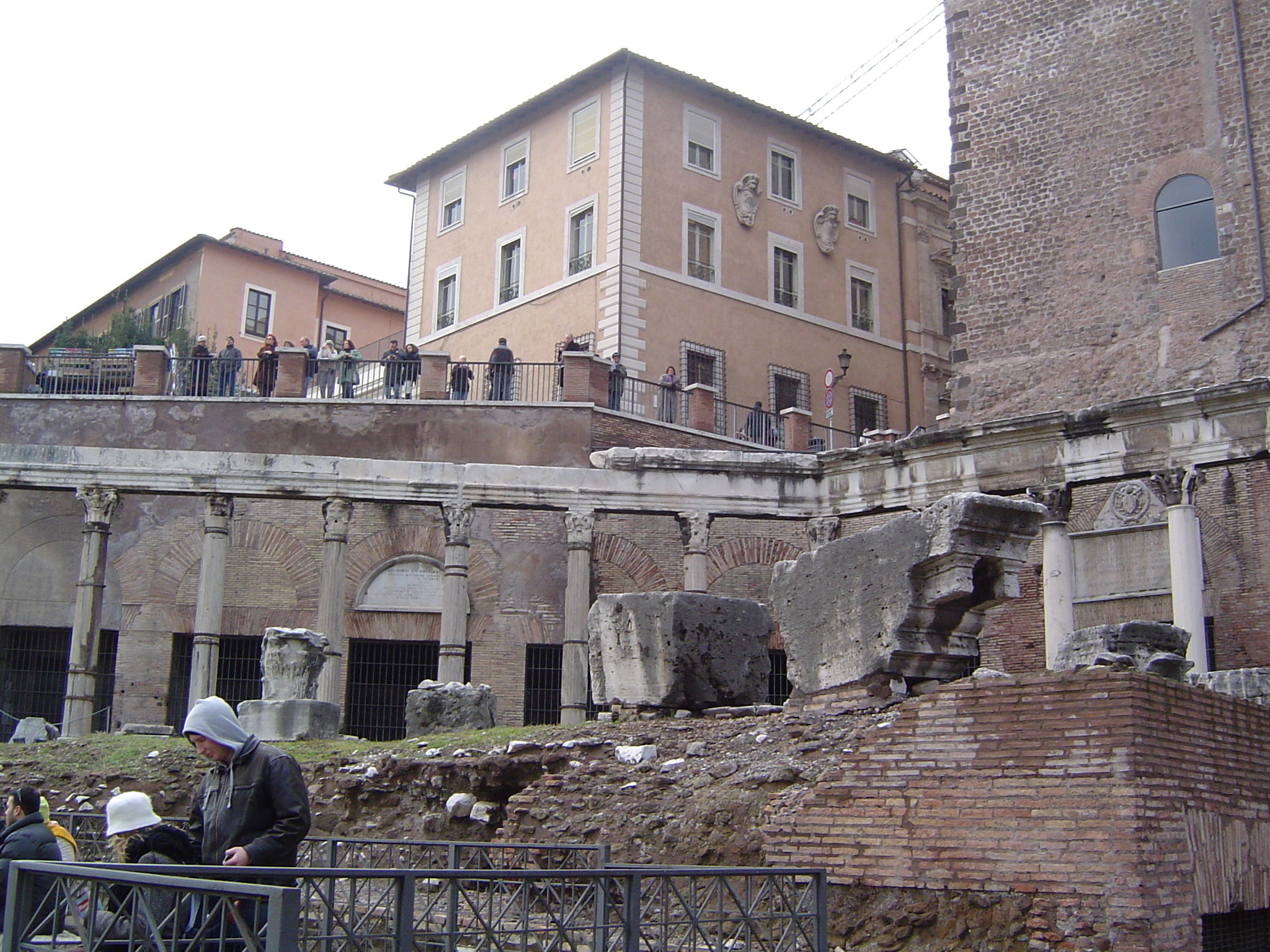
The Porticus Deorum Consentium in the Roman Forum; it was restored in 367 by Praetextatus, who reorganized also the worship of the Di Consentes, the protectors of the Roman Senate.

Praetextatus was one of the last political supporters of the res divina, the Roman religion, in Late Antiquity; he was particularly devoted to Vesta, as was his wife. Praetextatus was friend with another major figure of the pagan aristocracy, Quintus Aurelius Symmachus, with whom he exchanged letters partially conserved. According to Jerome, in reference to Bishop Damasus' luxurious lifestyle, he joked to him "Make me bishop of Rome and I will become a Christian".

During his office as Proconsul of Achaea he appealed against an edict by Emperor Valentinian I (issued in 364) that forbade night sacrifices during the Mysteries: Praetextatus maintained that this edict made it impossible for pagans to keep their faith, and Valentinian nullified his own edict.

In 367, during his tenure as praefectus urbi, he oversaw the restoration of the Porticus Deorum Consentium in the Roman Forum (41°53′33.2″N 12°29′1.27″E), the last great monument devoted to a pagan cult in Rome. Even if this was a simple restoration of the damaged statues and a renovation of the worship, it was a symbolic choice, as the Di Consentes were the protectors of the Senate, and therefore used to balance the power of the Emperor (it is significant that the inscription does not mention the Emperor). It has been also proposed that the restoration of the cult of the Di Consentes appealed to Praetextatus as a propagation of "his ideology of the numen multiplex" cited in his funerary poem.

A few years before his death, while his friend Symmachus was praefectus urbi, Praetextatus held an important ceremony, a pagan ascent to the Capitolium, an event that is recorded by Jerome: Praetextatus ascended, preceded by the highest magistrates, in a ceremony that was not a triumph, but which was really close to a pagan triumphal ceremony.

In 384, during his tenure as praetorian prefect, he obtained from Valentinian II an edict about the persecution of the crimes of demolition of pagan temples and the attribution of the related investigations to the praefectus urbi of Rome (who, at that time, was his friend Symmachus). Praetextatus' policy of restoration of the ancient Roman religion hit the Christian members of the imperial court (at Milan) and possibly it was for this reason that Symmachus, as friend and ally of Praetextatus, was falsely accused of torturing Christian priests: Symmachus responded that he was authorised by Praetextatus on the basis of the imperial edict and even Damasus supported him.

Praetextatus and Paulina had a palace located at the corner of via Merulana and viale del Monte Oppio (41°53′39.83″N 12°29′59.09″E) in Rome, on the place of the modern Palazzo Brancaccio. The garden around the palace, the so-called Horti Vettiani, extended to the modern Roma Termini railway station. Archaeological investigations in this area brought out several discoveries related to Praetextatus' family. Among them there is the base of a statue dedicated to Coelia Concordia, one of the last Vestal Virgins, who had erected a statue in honour of Praetextatus after his death; the latter statue was criticised by Symmachus, who wrote a letter to Flavianus saying he opposed this erection because that was the first time that the Virgins had erected a statue to a man, even if pontifex.

== Literature ==
Praetextatus published the Latin version of the Analytics written by Aristotle, in the Greek version composed by the philosopher Themistius. It is possible that Praetextatus knew Themistius, either meeting him in Constantinople or when the philosopher visited Rome (in 357, when Themistius followed Emperor Constantius II as leader of the Senate of Constantinople, or in 376, when Themistius honoured Emperor Gratian with a speech in the Roman Senate), and it is known he could read Greek, as he had been one of the quindecimvir sacri faciundi, who had to know Greek in order to read the Sybilline books.

Praetextatus also collaborated with acquaintances of Symmachus and Nicomachus Flavianus in the emendation and transmission of texts of the traditional Roman culture. He was also the main character of the Saturnalia by Macrobius Ambrosius Theodosius, and might be the target of the anonymous Carmen contra paganos.

== Bibliography ==
=== Primary sources ===
- CIL VI, 102; CIL VI, 1777; CIL VI, 1778; CIL VI, 1779
- Collectio Avellana
- Ammianus Marcellinus, Res Gestae Libri XXXI
- Jerome, letters
- Joannes Laurentius Lydus, De mensibus
- Sozomen, Historia Ecclesiastica
- Zosimus Historia Nova

=== Secondary sources ===
- Cameron, Alan. The Last Pagans of Rome. Oxford University Press, 2011, ISBN 978-0-19-974727-6.
- Jones, Arnold Hugh Martin, John Robert Martindale, John Morris, Prosopography of the Later Roman Empire: A.D. 260–395, volume 1 (PLRE I), Cambridge University Press, 1971, ISBN 0-521-07233-6.
- Kahlos, Maijastina, "The Restoration Policy of Praetextatus", Arctos 29 (1995), pp. 39–47.
- Kahlos, Maijastina, Vettius Agorius Praetextatus. A senatorial life in between, Institutum Romanum Finlandiae, Roma, 2002, ISBN 952-5323-05-6 (Acta Instituti Romani Finlandiae, 26).
- Lanciani, Rodolfo, Ancient Rome in the Light of Recent Discoveries, Houghton & Mifflin, Boston and New York, 1898, pp. 169–170. On-line at LacusCurtius
