= Hypatius (consul 359) =

Flavius Hypatius (Greek: Ύπάτιος; c. 336 – died after 383) was a Roman Senator, who was the brother-in-law of the Roman emperor Constantius II.

== Biography ==
Born into a family originating from the city of Thessalonica, and of Macedonian descent, Hypatius was the son of Flavius Eusebius, the Roman consul of 347. Probably through the influence of his sister Eusebia, the wife of the emperor Constantius II, Hypatius was appointed consul posterior alongside his brother Flavius Eusebius in AD 359, while still an adolescent.

Possibly appointed the vicarius urbi Romae on 21 February 363, at some point he moved to the city of Antioch. Here, in 371, Hypatius and his brother were accused of treason and put on trial during the reign of the emperor Valens. The accusation involved their involvement in a supposed prophecy which indicated that Notarius Theodorus would succeed Valens as emperor. Although Hypatius and Eusebius were found guilty, fined and exiled, they was soon recalled from their exile by the emperor through the intercession of the praepositus sacri cubiculi Heliodorus, the official who had accused Hypatius and his brother in the first place. Although his wealth and position were restored, Hypatius' career suffered while Valens still lived. Hypatius was still in Antioch when he received notification from the emperor Gratian of his appointment as praefectus urbi of Rome, shortly after the Battle of Adrianople. He held this post from late AD 378 until 5 April 379.

In 381, he was in Constantinople, where he was notified that he had been appointed the Praetorian Prefect of both Illyricum and Italy, a command he held from 382 to 383. During his time as Praetorian prefect he received a number of laws to promulgate, including one from Gratian on 21 May 383, which condemned anyone who converted from Christianity to either Paganism, Judaism, or Manichaeism.

A Christian who corresponded with Gregory of Nazianzus, Hypatius was praised highly by the historian Ammianus Marcellinus, who described him as gentle, placid, upright and honest. He was also honoured by the people of Crete. At some point he was raised to the rank of Patrician by the emperor.

== Sources ==
- Chastagnol, André, Les Fastes Par Andre Chastagnol (1962)
- Martindale, John R.; Jones, A. H. M.; Morris, John, eds. (1971). The Prosopography of the Later Roman Empire: Volume I, AD 260–395. Cambridge: Cambridge University Press. ISBN 0-521-07233-6.

Political offices
Preceded by Censorius Datianus; Neratius Cerealis	Consul of the Roman Empire; 359 with Flavius Eusebius	Succeeded by Flavius Julius Constantius Augustus X Flavius Claudius Julianus Caesar III
