= Eusebius (consul 359) =

Flavius Eusebius (Greek: Εὐσέβιος; died after 371) was a Roman Senator, who was the brother-in-law of the emperor Constantius II.

== Biography ==
Born into a family originating from the city of Thessalonica, and of Macedonian descent, Eusebius was the son of Flavius Eusebius, the consul of 347. Probably through the influence of his sister Eusebia, the wife of Constantius II, Eusebius was appointed the governor of the province of Hellespontus in 355. While here, he was noted as an efficient governor, and an improvement on his predecessors.

After his term had completed, he went to Antioch where he was notified of his appointment as governor of Bithynia et Pontus, which he held in 356. He was then made consul prior alongside his brother Flavius Hypatius in 359.

Eventually moving back to Antioch, it was here in 371 that Eusebius was accused of treason and put on trial during the reign of the emperor Valens. Although he was found guilty, fined and exiled, he was soon recalled from his exile by the emperor, and his wealth and position were restored.

A Christian, Eusebius was deeply admired by the teacher of rhetoric, Libanius, who described him as an excellent orator. At some point, he was raised to the rank of Patrician by the emperor.

== Sources ==
- Martindale, John R.; Jones, A. H. M.; Morris, John, eds. (1971). The Prosopography of the Later Roman Empire: Volume I, AD 260–395. Cambridge: Cambridge University Press. ISBN 0-521-07233-6.

Political offices
Preceded by Censorius Datianus; Neratius Cerealis	Consul of the Roman Empire; 359 with Flavius Hypatius	Succeeded by Flavius Julius Constantius Augustus X Flavius Claudius Julianus Caesar III
