= Emperor and Galilean =

1896 play by Henrik Ibsen

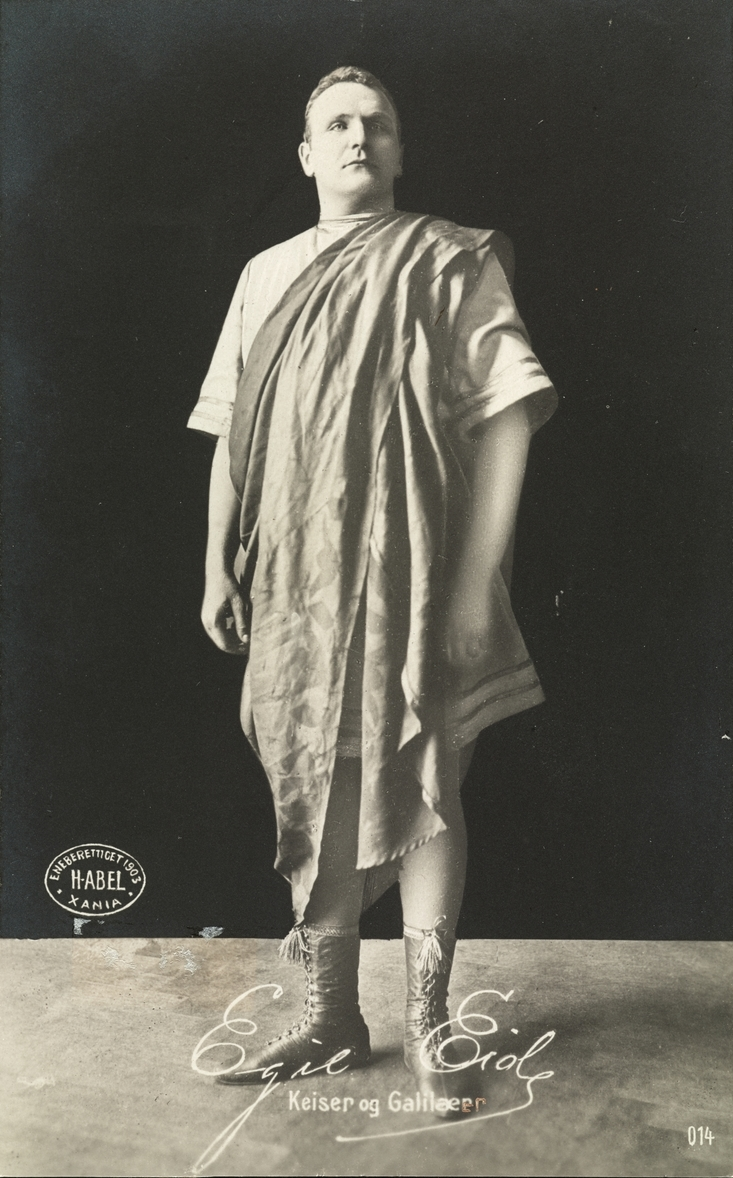
Egil Eide as Julian in the 1903 Oslo premiere of Emperor and Galilean

Emperor and Galilean (in Norwegian: Kejser og Galilæer) is a play written by Henrik Ibsen. Although it is one of the writer's lesser known plays, on several occasions Henrik Ibsen called Emperor and Galilean his major work. Emperor and Galilean is written in two complementary parts with five acts in each part and is Ibsen's longest play.

The play is about the Roman Emperor Julian the Apostate, the last pagan ruler of the Roman Empire. The play covers the years 351–363. It was his desire to bring the empire back to its ancient Roman values. Another crucial and more sympathetic feature of Emperor Julian, is his dislike of his own dynasty, who, in the play at least, were claiming descent and authority for being Galileans, making Jesus Christ their own, in terms of ethnicity.

== Writing ==
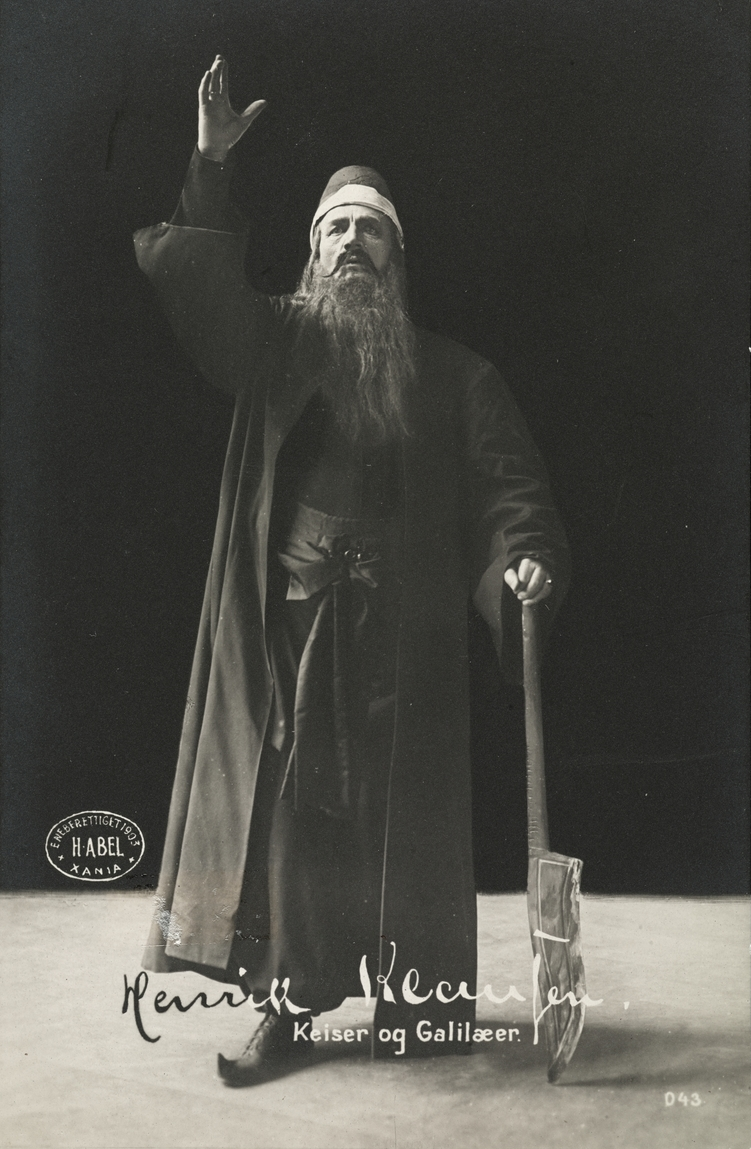
Henrik Klausen as the mystic Maximus in the play's Oslo premiere (1903)

The play was conceived by Ibsen in 1864. During his four years in Rome (1864–1868) he actively collected historical material, before starting to write the play itself in 1871. It was completed and published in 1873.

== Production history ==
The play was premièred at the Theater der Stadt in Leipzig on 5 December 1896. The piece was premiered at the National Theatre in Kristiania (now Oslo) on 30 March 1903.

A slightly abridged English translation was made by Michael Meyer in the early 1960s and revised in the 1980s: it has not been performed on stage, though it was broadcast on BBC Radio 3 on 30 March 1990, with Robert Glenister playing Julian.

The first stage performance in English was of a newly created version by Ben Power, given at the National Theatre in London on 9 June 2011: Julian was played by Andrew Scott, with Ian McDiarmid as Maximus. This formed the basis for a two-part audio adaptation broadcast on BBC Radio 3 in 2023, with Freddie Fox as Julian and Siân Phillips as Maxima, a female version of Maximus.

Another stage adaptation by Neil Wechsler premiered at Torn Space Theater in Buffalo, New York on Thursday, March 1, 2012, directed by David Oliver, starring Adriano Gatto as Julian.

== Themes ==
Ibsen called the play a "world drama in two parts", addressing the world order, the state of faith and what constitutes an ideal government, intertwining these three issues together with each other, with Julian's personality and with an artistic reconstruction of that historical era. It originates the idea of a "Third Reich", put into the mouth of the philosopher Maximus, as a moral and political ideal formed by a kind of synthesis between the realm of the flesh in paganism and the realm of the spirit in Christianity. The author wrote that the future had to be marked by such a synthesis, seeing that future as a community of noble, harmonious development and freedom, producing a society in which no person can oppress another and that future had to be reached by a revolution in the spirit and an internal rebirth.

== Synopsis ==
=== Part 1 – Caesar's Apostasy ===
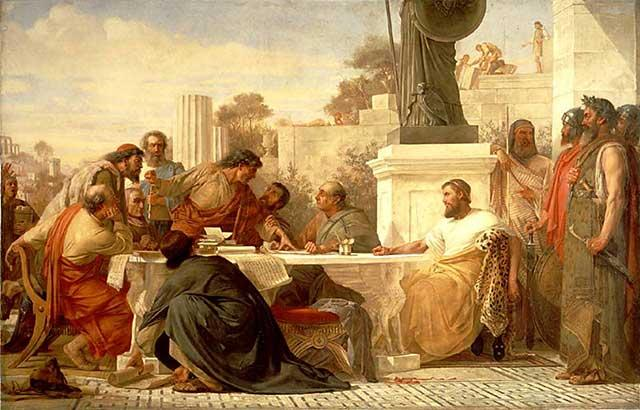
Julian the Apostate was the last pagan Roman emperor and tried in vain to suppress Christianity and bring the empire back to its ancient religion.

==== Act 1 ====
Julian, a cousin of Emperor Constantine II, lives at the court in Christian Constantinople, surrounded by constant surveillance. His mentor, a teacher of theology called Ekivoly, fears the impact the sophist Libanius might have on Julian and so distributes poems round the city, hostile to Julian and attributed to Libanius. Julian learns the truth about the poems from Agathon, son of a winegrower from Cappadocia. Constantius announces his will – his heir will be his cousin Gallus, Julian's half-brother – and his banishment of Libanius to Athens. Julian then asks for permission to study in Pergamum, which Constantius grants, though thinking it a strange wish. However, unbeknown to Constantius, Julian goes to Athens instead.

The first act takes place in Christian Constantinople, ruled by the emperor Constantius II. There the play's main character, Constantius' young cousin prince Julian, is under constant surveillance; the city's inhabitants are very divided as to what is correct Christianity; the emperor's court is corrupt. For his part, Julian is a searching soul and wants answers to the central questions of life. He is visited by his childhood friend Agathon, who is an honest Christian. Julian, on the other hand, is in love with ancient Greece and asks himself why Christianity has destroyed the beauty of Greek thought. He follows his teacher Libanius to Athens. Agathon, on the other hand, tells Julian about a vision he has had – he believes that this referred to Julian and Julian agrees, in that it showed God designating him to "break with the lions".

==== Act 2 ====
The second act takes place in Athens, where Julian talks with Libanius, in whom he soon loses interest, and with the Church Fathers Basil of Caesarea and Gregory of Nazianzus, who become less and less of an influence on him. These three are all members of the intellectual circle which has gathered around Julian as he becomes popular in the Greek Academy, running rhetorical discussions and logical debating. Julian becomes disenchanted with his teacher and does not think he has found what he was really looking for – that is, the truth. He hears rumours of a mystic named Maximus, and Julian decides to leave Athens to find him.

==== Act 3 ====
This act takes place in Ephesus, where the mystic Maximus has set up a mysterious symposium for Julian to communicate with the other world and thus find out the meaning of his life. Here Julian first encounters a voice in the light, telling him that he must "establish the kingdom on the freedom road". The voice also states that "Freedom and necessity are one" and that Julian will do "what he will have to do". The voice says no more and Julian is then presented with a vision of the two great deniers, Cain and Judas Iscariot. The third great denier is still in the land of the living and Maximus will show Julian no more. Immediately news arrives that Gallus, heir to the imperial throne, is dead and that Julian has been appointed Caesar of the Roman Empire. Julian takes this as a sign that he will establish the kingdom referred to in the vision.

==== Act 4 ====
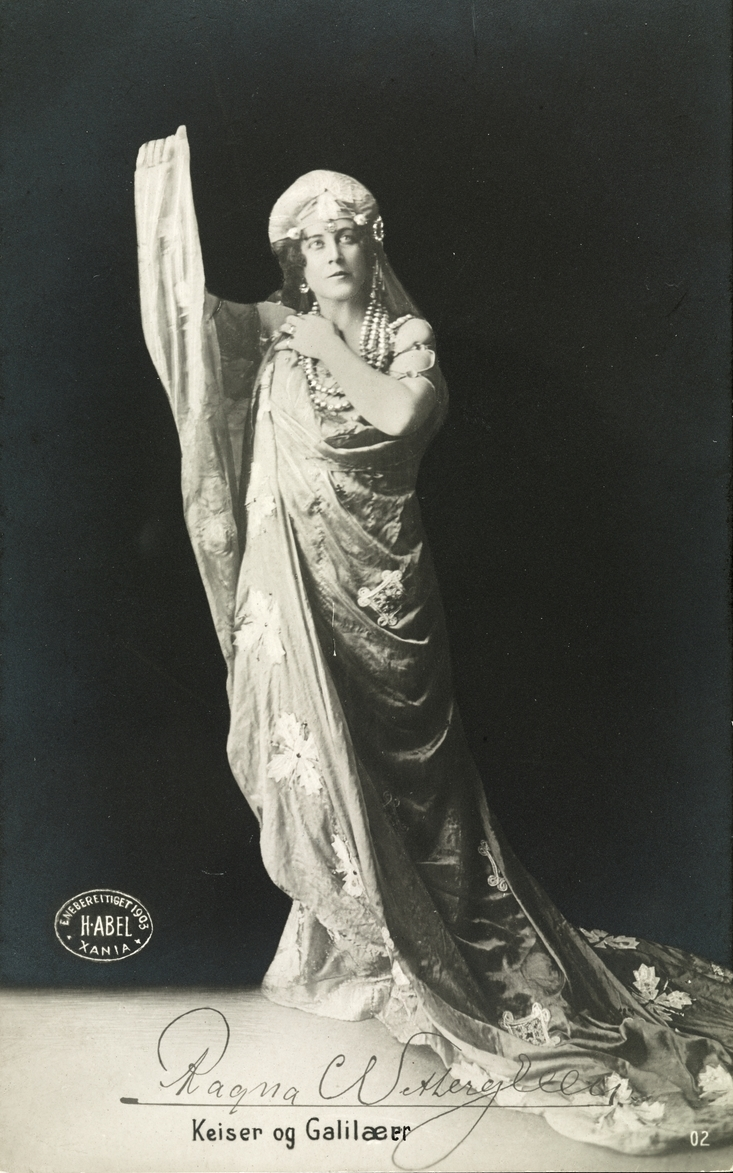
Ragna Wettergreen as Helena in the play's Oslo premiere (1903)

This act occurs in Lutetia, where it turns out that Julian has made himself unpopular with the emperor because of a misconception by a local tribal chief who came to pay him tribute as "Emperor". Gallus is suspected of trying to murder the emperor and removed, thus clearing Julian's way to power. He marries Helena, Constantius's sister and Constantine the Great's daughter, but he does not enjoy his family life for long – Constantius' assassins poison Helena in a conspiracy and in her delirious dying moments she reveals to Julian that she had loved his dead brother and that she had committed treason against Constantius. The soldiers backing Julian then convince him to go to Constantinople and seize power.

==== Act 5 ====
The act takes place in Vienne, where Julian is waiting for news of the intrigues around the emperor's sick-bed and updates from the mystic Maximus. The act is a long struggle, which ends in Julian finally making a complete rejection of Christianity in favour of pure neo-Platonism. It ends with him making an offering to Helios as he is proclaimed emperor of the Roman Empire.

=== Part 2 – The Emperor Julian ===
After becoming emperor, Julian reveals his commitment to paganism. He calls for tolerance, but Christians quickly begin to destroy pagan temples, and the pagans retaliate. Julian, believing he has a destiny, leads an army against the Persians. He is tricked into burning his ships, and his army is defeated. Julian is killed, and we hear the army rejoicing that the new Emperor is a Christian.

== Characters ==
=== Part 1 ===
- Emperor Constantius II
- Empress Eusebia
- Helena, sister of the Emperor
- Gallus, a cousin of Emperor
- Julian, half-brother of Gallus
- Memnon, an Ethiopian slave, the bodyguard of the Emperor
- Potamon, goldsmith
- Fokion, dyer
- Evnapy, barber
- Fruiterer
- Brigade Commander of the palace guards
- Soldiers
- Rouged woman
- A paralytic
- A blind beggar
- Agathon, son of a vine-grower from Cappadocia
- Libanius, a philosopher
- Gregory of Nazianzus
- Basil of Caesarea
- Sallust of Perusia
- Hecebolius, a teacher of theology
- Maximus, a mystic
- Eutherius, a chamberlain
- Leontes, a quaestor
- Myrrha, a slave woman
- Decentius, a tribune
- Sintula, an equerry
- Florentius and Severus, generals
- Oribases, a doctor
- Laipso and Varro, subalterns
- Maurus, a standard-bearer
- Soldiers, church-goers, pagan spectators, courtiers, priests, students of philosophy, dancing-girls, servants, the quaestor's suite, Gaulish warriors.
- Visions and voices.

=== Part 2 ===
- The Emperor Julian
- Nevita, a general
- Potamon, a goldsmith
- Caesarius of Nazianzus, physician to the Emperor
- Themistius and Mamertinus, orators
- Ursulus, Chancellor of the Exchequer
- Eunapius, a barber
- Barbara
- Hecebolius, a teacher of theology
- Courtiers and civil servants
- Inhabitants of Constantinople
- Participants in the procession of Dionysus, flute-players, dancers, acrobats, and women
- Envoys from the eastern kings
- Eutherius, a chamberlain
- Palace servants
- Judges, orators, teachers, and inhabitants of Antioch
- Medon, a corn-merchant
- Malchus, a tax-collector
- Gregory of Nazianzus, brother of Caesarius
- Phocion, a dyer
- Publia
- Hilarion, her son
- Agathon of Cappadocia
- Bishop Maris of Chalcedon
- Participants in the procession of Apollo, priests, temple-servants, harpists, and city guards
- Agathon's younger brother
- The procession of Christian captives
- Heraclius, a poet
- Oribases, physician to the Emperor
- Libanius, orator, and chief magistrate of Antioch
- Apollinaris, a hymn writer
- Cyrillus, a teacher
- An old priest at the sanctuary of Cybele
- Women psalm-singers of Antioch
- Fromentinus, a captain
- Jovian, a general
- Maximus, a mystic
- Numa, a soothsayer
- Two other Etruscan soothsayers
- Hormisdas, an exiled Persian prince
- Anatolus, captain of the bodyguard
- Priscus and Chytron, philosophers
- Ammian, a captain
- Basil of Caesarea
- Macrina, his sister
- A Persian deserter
- Roman and Greek soldiers
- Persian warriors

== Other sources ==
- Moi, Toril (2006) Henrik Ibsen and the Birth of Modernism (Oxford University Press) ISBN 978-0-19-929587-6
- Ferguson, Robert (1996) Henrik Ibsen: A New Biography (Richard Cohen Books) ISBN 978-1-86066-078-8
- McFarlane, James (1994) The Cambridge Companion to Ibsen (Cambridge University Press) ISBN 978-0-521-42321-2
