= Neratius Cerealis =

Roman politician and aristocrat

- Years active: fl. 328–358
- Office: Praefectus urbi (352–353); Consul (358)
- Children: 1 son

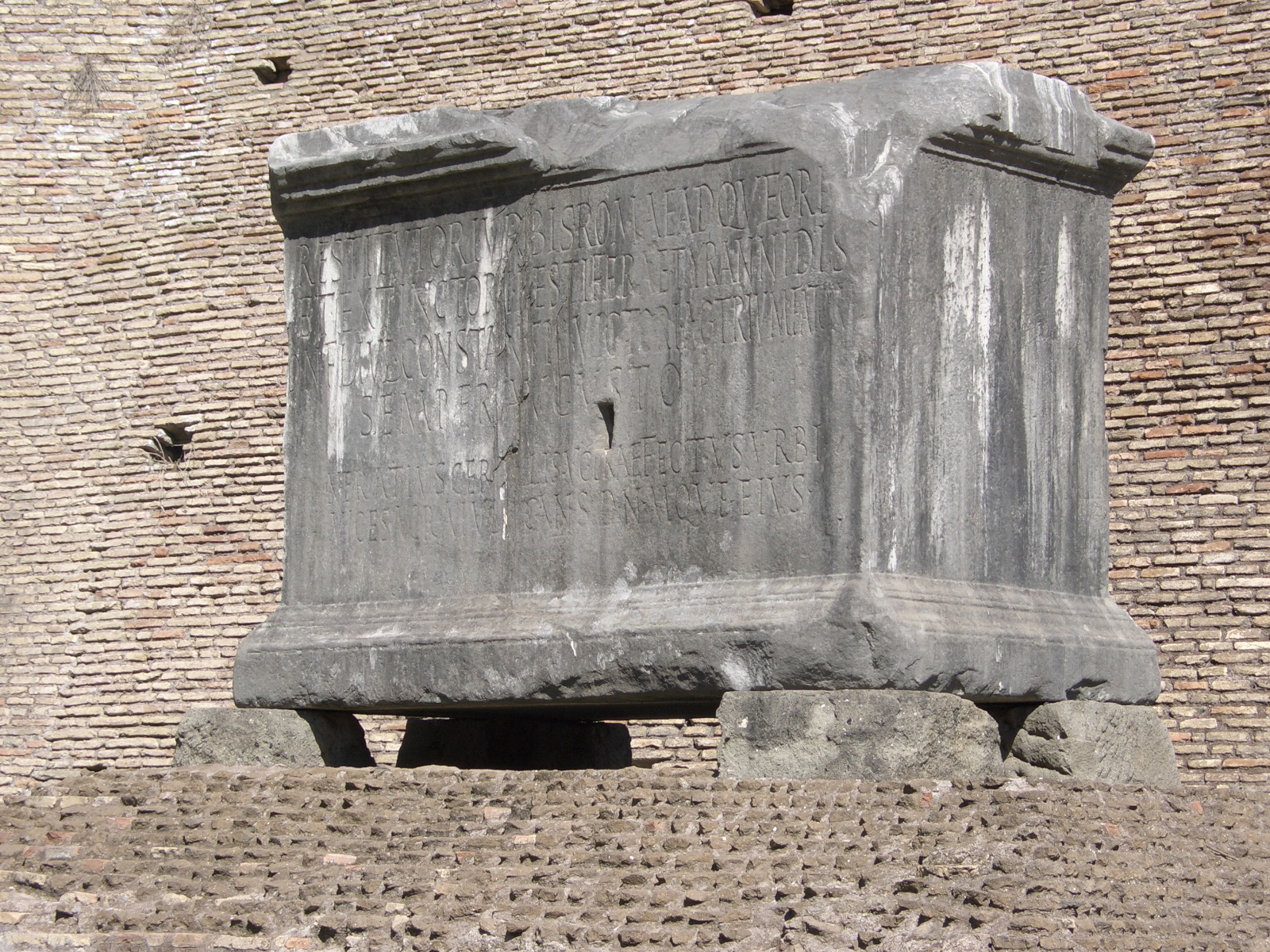
Basis of the statue to Emperor Constantius II erected by Neratius Cerealis in the Roman Forum (CIL VI, 1158).

Neratius (or Naeratius) Cerealis (fl. 328–358) was a Roman senator and politician, Praefectus urbi and consul.

== Biography ==
He was the brother of Galla, wife of Julius Constantius, and half-brother of Vulcacius Rufinus, and probably had a son named Neratius Scopius. He owned some balnea on the Esquiline Hill in Rome, the balnea Neratii Cerealis, located between the church built by Pope Liberius (the modern Basilica di Santa Maria Maggiore) and the Basilica of Junius Bassus; maybe it was the domus Neratiorum, owned by an aristocratic family of the 2nd century, to which he added the balnea around 360.

In 328 he was praefectus annonae of Rome.

In late summer 351 he was in Sirmium, a member of the tribunal processing Photinus; the city was under the control of Emperor Constantius II, while Rome was occupied by the usurper Magnentius. It is probable that Neratius remained with Constantius until he was appointed Praefectus urbi of Rome, on September 26, 352, a little time after the usurper had left the city. As Praefectus he asked to divert the grain for Capua, Puteoli, and other cities of Campania to Rome. His office ended on December 8, 353.

On the right of the Arch of Septimius Severus in the Roman Forum, between the arch and the Curia, the base of a statue erected by Neratius in honour of Constantius II is still extant; the Emperor is celebrated in the epigraph (CIL VI, 1158) as restitutor urbis et orbis, extinctor pestiferae tyrannidis, a reference to his victory over Magnentius.

Neratius was consul in 358.

Jerome records the answer that a young widow, Marcella, gave to Neratius when he proposed to marry her, late in his life: she said that if she wanted to marry again, she would choose a husband, not an inheritance.

== Bibliography ==
- Martindale, John R.; Jones, A. H. M.; Morris, John, eds. (1971). "Cerealis 2". The Prosopography of the Later Roman Empire: Volume I, AD 260–395. Cambridge: Cambridge University Press. pp. 197–199. ISBN 0-521-07233-6.

Political offices
Preceded by Constantius Augustus IX; Julian Caesar II	Roman consul 358 with Censorius Datianus	Succeeded by Eusebius; Hypatius
Preceded by Septimius Mnasea	Urban prefect of Rome; 352–353	Succeeded by Memmius Vitrasius Orfitus
