= Memmius Vitrasius Orfitus =

Roman aristocrat and politician (died c. 369)

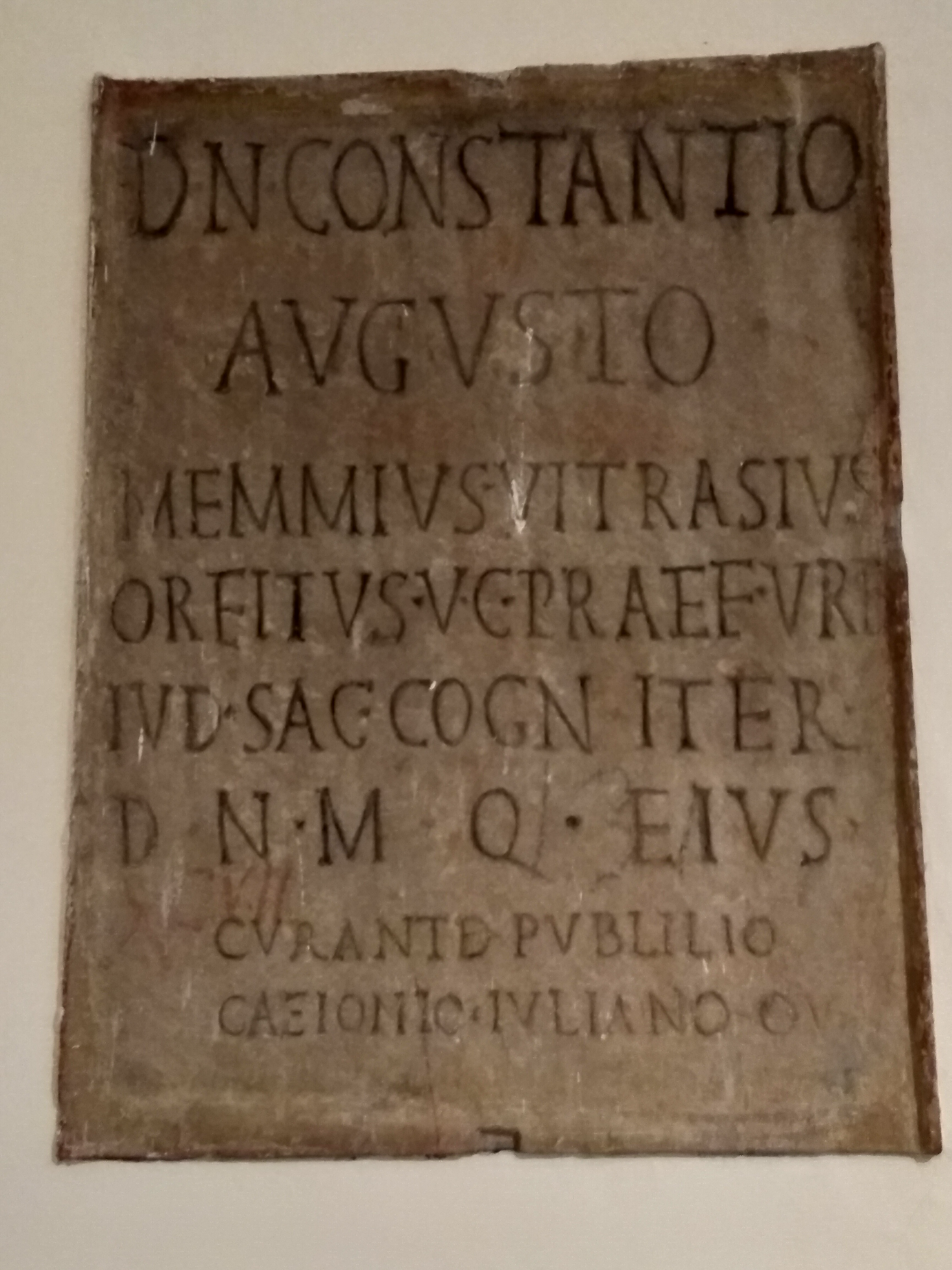
Inscription for a statue in honour of Constantius II

Memmius Vitrasius Orfitus signo Honorius (died c. 369) was a Roman politician.

== Biography ==
Orfitus came from a noble family, and started his career at a relatively young age. He held the posts of quaestor and praetor before becoming consularis of Sicilia under Constantius II and Constans (340/350). He supported Constantius in a war against Magnentius and was appointed to the office of proconsul of Africa after Constantius got control over it.

Between 353 and 355 he was praefectus urbi, succeeding Neratius Cerealis. In 357 he got urban prefecture again; at this time Constantius visited Rome in 357. In 359 he was replaced by Leontius.

According to Ammianus Marcellinus, "he was a man of wisdom, it is true, and highly skilled in legal practice, but less equipped with the adornment of the liberal arts than became a man of noble rank". Various Roman corporas erected statues in his honor.

A devout pagan, he was a Pontifex Deae Vestae and Pontifex Dei Solis and during his second term as the praefectus urbi he built a shrine to Apollo.

In 364 he was accused of peculation by the baker Terentius. Because of that Orfitus was exiled and had his property confiscated, but soon he was recalled through the influence of Vulcacius Rufinus.

He died around 369. His wife, Constantia, was related to the house of Constantine; according to Alan Cameron, she probably was a daughter of Hannibalianus and Constantina. His daughter, Rusticiana, married the orator Quintus Aurelius Symmachus. Another daughter, whose name is unknown, lived in Etruria in 385.

== Sources ==
- Martindale, John R.; Jones, A. H. M.; Morris, John, eds. (1971–1992). "Memmius Vitrasius Orfitus signo Honorius 3". The Prosopography of the Later Roman Empire (3 vols.). Cambridge: Cambridge University Press.
- Seeck O. Symmachos 16 // Paulys Realencyclopädie der classischen Altertumswissenschaft. — 1931. — Bd. IV A, 1. — Kol. 1144—1146.
