= Aconia Fabia Paulina =

Roman aristocrat and priestess

- Died: c. 384
- Spouse: Vettius Agorius Praetextatus (344-384, his death)
- Children: At least 1
- Father: Aconius Catullinus Philomatius

Aconia Fabia Paulina (died c. 384) was a late Roman aristocrat and priestess. Her father was Aconius Catullinus Philomatius, who was suffect consul in 349. In 344 Paulina married Vettius Agorius Praetextatus, and was through him initiated into various mystery cults.

Paulina and her husband owned property on the Esquiline and Aventine hills in Rome, close to which inscriptions about them have been found. Most knowledge about the couple comes from four inscriptions on a funerary monument to them (CIL VI, 1779), with Paulina often considered to be the author of the poem about Praetextatus on it. They were also well known in their time for their paganism, being mentioned to that effect in two letters by Jerome and other contemporary Christian sources.

== Biography ==
Paulina's father Aconius Catullinus Philomatius was a prominent aristocrat who held the office of Praefectus urbi of Rome from 342 to 344 and served as ordinary consul in 349. In 344, Paulina married Vettius Agorius Praetextatus, who held numerous posts in the provinces of the Roman Empire and was ultimately appointed praetorian prefect of Italy in 384 before dying in the same year.

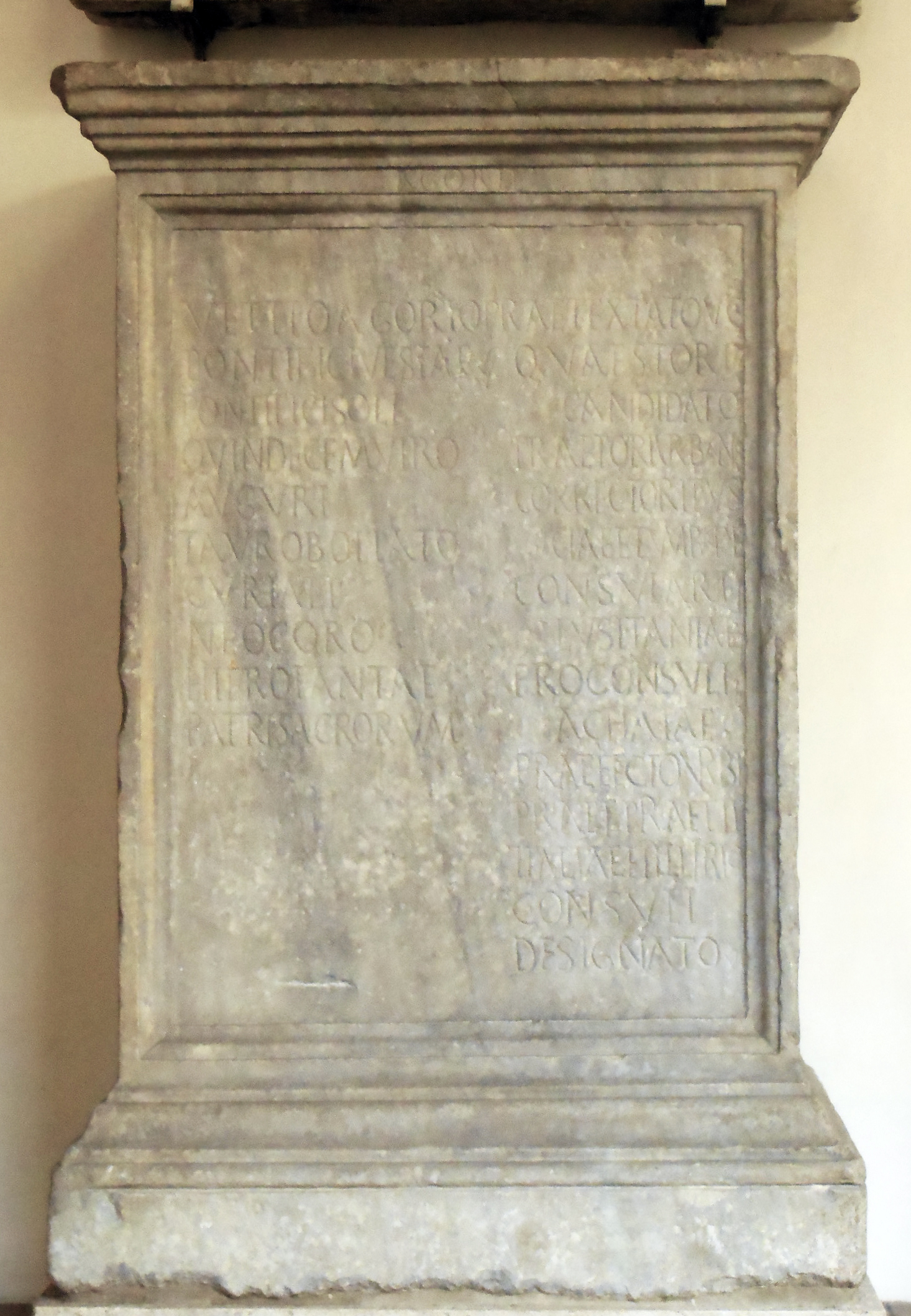
Plinth with descriptions of the religious roles held by Praetextatus (387). CIL VI, 1778

Praetextatus was a member of various mystery cults, into which he initiated Paulina. Through the Eleusian mysteries she entered the cult of Iacchus and of Persephone and Ceres, goddesses whose cults (in addition to that of Liber) she also encountered through the Lernian mysteries. A consacranea in the cult of Ceres, Paulina was also a hierophant in the cult of Hecate, which had its base in Aegina. Paulina may have completed her initiation in these three Greek mystery cults from 362 to 364, during her husband's tenure as governor of the province of Achaia. Through baptism with bull's blood Paulina was also initiated into the cult of Isis, where she held the rank of Isiaca, and she was also a devotee of the Magna Mater and Attis.

Information about Paulina's contact with these mystery cults is derived from the funerary monument to her and Praetextatus, as well as on an inscription on a plinth that likely supported a statue of her (CIL VI, 1780). To the former, religion takes greater prominence than in comparable ancient inscriptions. She and Praetextatus may then have sought to highlight their devotion to the pagan gods in the face of the growing popularity of Christianity. 384 was indeed a highpoint in the influence of the pagan aristocracy, which however decreased in the same year due to Praetextatus's death and the failure of his friend Quintus Aurelius Symmachus's attempt to return the altar of Victory to the Senate.

The date of Paulina's own death is disputed. Maijastina Kahlos has argued that she died in 384 shortly after her husband, while Heike Niquet and Jörg Rüpke have proposed that she died in 387, suggesting that her death prompted the creation of an inscription to Praetextatus that is dated to that year (CIL VI, 1778). She and Praetextatus were survived by at least one child, who dedicated a monument in their house to them.

== Sources ==
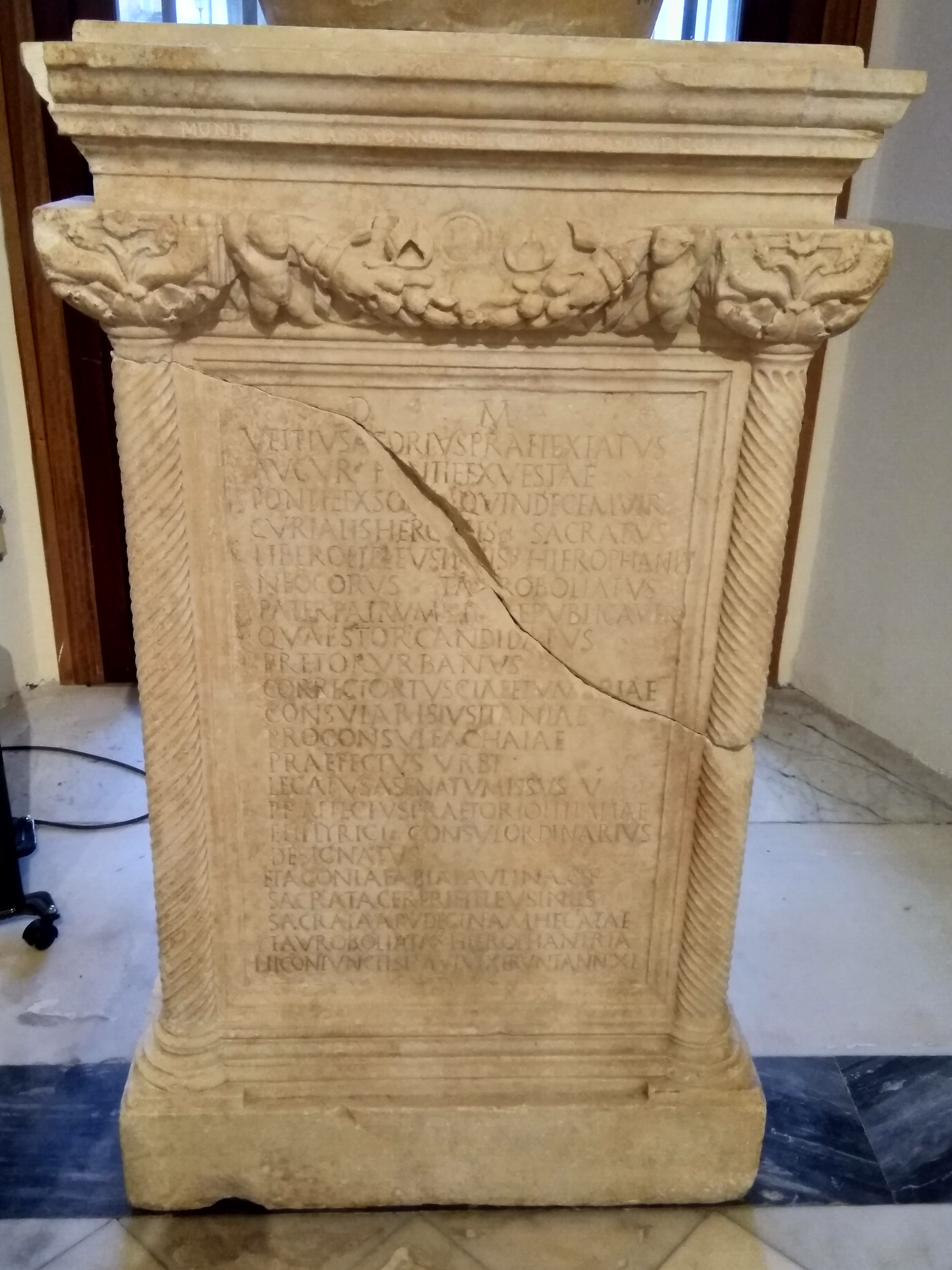
Front of the plinth for a statue of Vettius Agorius Praetextatus

=== Inscriptions on the Esquiline and Aventine ===
Paulina and Praetextatus likely owned at least two houses in Rome. The first was on the Esquiline Hill, probably situated between via Merulana and viale del Monte Oppio in Rome, where the modern Palazzo Brancaccio stands (41°53′39.83″N 12°29′59.09″E). In 1591, archaeological investigations in this area uncovered two inscriptions about Paulina and Praetextatus. The first (CIL VI, 1781) records Praetextatus' gardens, the so-called Horti Vettiani, which extended to the modern Roma Termini railway station. The second of them (CIL VI, 2145) was the base of a statue dedicated to Coelia Concordia, one of the last Vestal Virgins, who had erected a statue in honour of Praetextatus after his death (384); in exchange for this honour Paulina dedicated a statue to Concordia. Subsequently, lead pipes have been found in this area with the names of Paulina and Praetextatus upon them (CIL XV, 7563), which probably record private plumbing to the couple's house on the Esquiline.

The couple may also have had a house on the Aventine, since in the sixteenth century an inscription (CIL VI, 1777) was found in the church of Saints Boniface and Alessio on the hill which refers to a statue of Praetextatus in the latter's house.

=== The funerary monument to Paulina and Praetextatus ===
The most important source for Paulina's life are however the inscriptions on the funerary monument to her and Praetextatus (CIL VI, 1779). This monument was found in 1750 in an unknown location in Rome, and is now kept in the Capitoline Museums. In contrast to the majority of other fourth-century Roman monuments in stone, that to Paulina and Praetextatus is not composed of spolia, but rather a previously unused block of Parian marble. The monument is 126 cm high, 76 cm wide and 56 cm deep, and its decoration indicates that it was used as an altar, perhaps inside a mausoleum.

Four sides of this monument are inscribed. One of the inscriptions lists Praetextatus' cursus honorum and the religious roles possessed by him and Paulina. The other three inscriptions are in iambic hexameter. Two are poems from Praetextatus in praise of Paulina, and the last is a poem of 41 lines in which Paulina praises her husband and their marriage.

Although written from Paulina's perspective, it is debated whether she composed this poem. Giovanni Polara has argued that the similarity in style between this inscription and the other three on the monument point to an anonymous poet who composed these pieces at Paulina and Praetextatus' behest. By contrast, Pierre Lambrechts and Maijastina Kahlos have proposed that Paulina held an oration at her husband's funeral, which then formed the basis of this poem, and Jane Stevenson has also identified it as one of the few extant funeral orations to have been composed by a late Roman woman. While not doubting Paulina's authorship, Alan Cameron has questioned whether the poem was composed for Praetextatus' funeral. Since the first 37 lines are written in the present tense and the last four only in the past tense, he suggests instead that Paulina may have written the majority of the poem while Praetextatus was still alive, perhaps to mark their 40th anniversary, only adding the last lines after her husband's death. Cameron argued moreover that this may explain why contemporary writers like Jerome and Symmachus appear to have known about Paulina's poem in works that appear to have been written prior to the erection of the monument to her and Praetextatus. In a 2022 article, Camilla Campedelli defended anew the argument that the poem had been written to mark Praetextatus's death, observing that a Roman viewer would have probably read the four inscriptions in a circle, thereby bringing them into a dialogue which is reflected in lines that suggest the couple communicating across the different poems of the monument.

=== References to Paulina in Jerome's letters ===
At the time of Praetextatus's death, the Church Father Jerome was serving as secretary to Pope Damasus and mentor to a group of aristocratic Roman women, which included Paula and Marcella. Jerome was therefore likely aware of the political context of Rome and Praetextatus's influence upon it, as well as Paulina's status as a prominent pagan.

In a letter to Marcella written shortly after Praetextatus' death, Jerome indeed mocks the latter, claiming that he was not in paradise but in hell. According to Kahlos, this letter shows that Jerome knew Paulina's poem to Praetextatus, in that he twice mentions her hope to join her husband in heaven. In another letter, Jerome also lambasts Paula for doubting that her daughter Blaesilla was in heaven, when a pagan like Paulina believed that her husband was in paradise. This has sometimes been taken to show that Jerome knew the exact text of Paulina's poem to Praetextatus, or else simply as a more general product of the couple's fame as convinced pagans.

Camilla Campedelli has argued that Jerome's harsh response to Paula was due to the fact that he considered Paulina and Praetextatus' paganism to be a threat, since the mystery cults to which they belonged promised eternal life without the asceticism that he sought to promote among the Roman aristocracy. In funerary verse drafted for Paula and included in a letter to her daughter, Jerome deliberately contrasts the Christian Paula with the pagan Paulina. Whereas Rome stands in the centre of Paulina's inscription, Jerome argues that Paula had migrated from there to Bethlehem. He moreover contrasts the constriction of the grave with the expansiveness of eternal life, likely a commentary on the rich funerary monument dedicated to Paulina and Praetextatus.

=== Carmen contra paganos ===
The Carmen contra paganos is an invectice against a deceased pagan prefect and his wife, composed by an anonymous Christian author. This prefect has traditionally been identified with Virius Nicomachus Flavianus, but more recent work has identified this official and his wife with Praetextatus and Paulina.

=== De excidio Hierosolymitano ===
Another late-fourth century AD invective is De excidio Hierosolymitano attributed to pseudo-Hegesippus, in which a virgin named Paulina is seduced by a suitor named Mundus who claims to be the god Anubis and is raped by him in a temple dedicated to Isis. This work is based on a section in Josephus's Jewish Antiquities, but Duncan MacRae has argued that its anonymous author rewrote this material to mock Praetextatus and Paulina. MacRae sees in it an attack on Paulina's morals and on the initiation rites of pagan rituals, with the sinister portrayal of Mundus equally serving to attack the 'seduction' of Roman women by pagan religion.

== Bibliography ==
=== Primary sources ===
- CIL VI, 1779, CIL VI, 1780, CIL VI, 2145

=== Secondary sources ===
- Campedelli, Camilla (2022). "Der Grabaltar von Praetextatus und Paulina. Eine aristokratische Liebeserklärung über den Tod hinaus." Gymnasium 129, pp. 215–233.
- Kahlos, Maijastina, "Paulina and the Death of Praetextatus", Arduum res gestas scribere
- Kahlos, Maijastina, Vettius Agorius Praetextatus. A senatorial life in between, Institutum Romanum Finlandiae, Roma, 2002, ISBN 952-5323-05-6 (Acta Instituti Romani Finlandiae, 26).
- Lanciani, Rodolfo, Ancient Rome in the Light of Recent Discoveries, Houghton & Mifflin, Boston e New York, 1898, pp. 169–170.
- Stevenson, Jane, Women Latin Poets, Oxford University Press, 2005, ISBN 0-19-818502-2, pp. 71–72.
- Thayer, Bill, "Honorific Inscription of Vettius Agorius Praetextatus", Lacus Curtius
