= Eusebius (consul 347) =

Roman consul

Flavius Eusebius (died c. 350) was a Roman military officer and politician. He is usually identified as the father of Eusebia, and consequently as the posthumous father-in-law of the Roman emperor Constantius II.

== Biography ==
Born in Thessalonica to a family of Macedonian descent, Eusebius served prior to 347 as the Magister equitum et peditum in the east, probably under the emperor Constantius II. During his time as military commander, he intervened in Armenia, possibly to suppress the revolt of Bacour.

After he had retired from this post, he held the rank of Comes and was made consul posterior alongside Vulcacius Rufinus in 347.

Eusebius was probably a Christian. He had at least three children: his sons Flavius Eusebius and Flavius Hypatius held the consulship together in 359, and his daughter Eusebia married Emperor Constantius II after her father had died.

== Sources ==
- Martindale, John R.; Jones, A. H. M.; Morris, John, eds. (1971). The Prosopography of the Later Roman Empire: Volume I, AD 260–395. Cambridge: Cambridge University Press. ISBN 0-521-07233-6.

Political offices
| Preceded by Constantius Augustus IV; Constans Augustus III | Roman consul 347 with Vulcacius Rufinus | Succeeded by Flavius Philippus; Flavius Salia |
