= Antipope Ursicinus =

Roman priest elected pope in 366 or 367

- Elected: 366
- Papacy began: 366
- Papacy ended: 367
- Predecessor: Roman claimant: Damasus I Liberius; Antipapal claimant: Felix II
- Successor: Roman claimant: Damasus I Antipapal claimant: Eulalius
- Opposed to: Pope Damasus I

Personal details
- Died: c. 381
- Denomination: Arianism (Note: Ambrose of Milan, Epistles iv)

Ursicinus (died c. 381), also known as Ursinus, was elected pope in a violently contested election in 366 as a rival to Pope Damasus I. He ruled in Rome for several months in 366–367, was afterwards declared antipope, and died after 381.

== Background ==
In 355, Emperor Constantius II, who was sympathetic towards the Arians, banished Liberius for refusing to subscribe to a sentence of condemnation against Saint Athanasius, staunch opponent of Arius of Alexandria.

Liberius was sent to a prison in Berea in Thrace. The Collectio Avellana says that Damasus was a deacon in Rome; Alban Butler and the Encyclopedia Britannica name him an archdeacon of the Roman Church. In any event, Damasus followed Liberius into exile, though he immediately returned to Rome. Having sworn to have no Pope but Liberius, members of the Roman clergy then chose the Archdeacon Felix as his successor, an action that proved unpopular with the general populace. During the period before Liberius's return, Damasus had a great share in the government of the church.

In May 357, at the insistence of a number of prominent Romans, Liberius was allowed to return. Apparently the Emperor expected Felix and Liberius to rule jointly, but when Liberius returned, Felix was forced to retire to Porto, near Rome, where, after making an unsuccessful attempt to establish himself again in Rome, he died on 22 November 365. However, the rival parties remained highly polarized in Rome.

== History ==
Liberius died on 24 September 366. The upper-class partisans of Felix threw their support to Damasus, but the opposing supporters of Liberius, the deacons and laity, supported Ursicinus; the two were elected simultaneously, in an atmosphere of rioting. Supporters already clashed at the beginning of October. Such was the violence and bloodshed that the two praefecti of the city were called in to restore order, and after a first setback, when they were driven to the suburbs and a massacre of 137 was perpetrated in the basilica of Sicininus (as cited by Ammianus Marcellinus), the prefects banished Ursicinus to Gaul. There was further violence when he returned, which continued after Ursicinus was exiled again.

Church historians, such as Jerome and Rufinus, took the part of Damasus. At a synod in 378 Ursicinus was condemned and Damasus exonerated and declared the true pope. The former antipope continued to intrigue against Damasus for the next few years, and unsuccessfully attempted to revive his claim on Damasus's death. Ursicinus was among the Arian party in Milan, according to Ambrose (Epistle iv).

== See also ==
- Papal selection before 1059
