= Hannibalianus =

King of the Kings and of the Pontic People

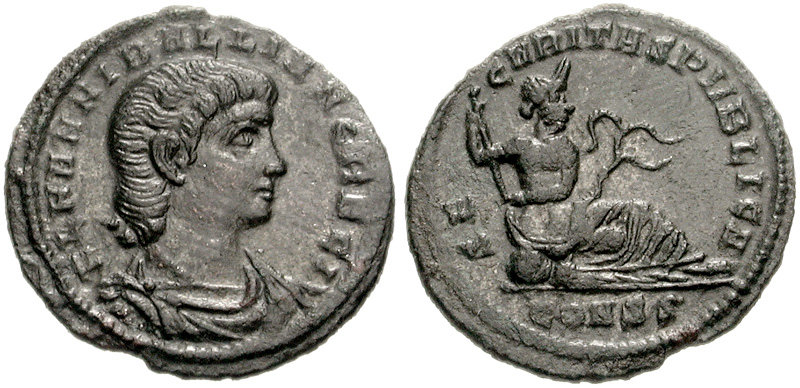
- Follis of "King" Hannibalianus

Rex Regum
- Reign: 335 – c. 337
- Died: c. 337
- Spouse: Constantina
- Issue: Constantia
- Dynasty: Constantinian
- Father: Flavius Dalmatius

Flavius Hannibalianus (also Hanniballianus; died 337) was a member of the Constantinian dynasty, which ruled over the Roman Empire in the 4th century.

Hannibalianus was the son of Flavius Dalmatius, and thus nephew of Constantine the Great. Hannibalianus and his brother Dalmatius were educated at Tolosa by rhetor Exuperius (who is probably not to be identified with St. Exuperius).

In 320s, Constantine called Flavius Dalmatius and his sons to Constantinople. Hannibalianus married Constantine's elder daughter, Constantina, in 335, and was made nobilissimus. He and Constantina may have had a daughter named Constantia, who would later marry Memmius Vitrasius Orfitus and become mother of Rusticiana, wife of Quintus Aurelius Symmachus.

On occasion of the campaign of Constantine against the Sassanids (337), Hannibalianus was made Rex Regum et Ponticarum Gentium, "King of the Kings and of the Pontic Peoples". Probably it was Constantine's intention to put Hannibalianus on the Pontic throne, after the defeat of the Persians.

The Persian campaign did not take place, because Constantine died in May 337. Hannibalianus died, as did his brother, father, and other relatives, in the purge of the imperial family that followed. Burgess states that it is "almost certain" that Hannibalianus and the other victims of the purge were in Constantinople in the midst of a military mutiny.
