= Flavius Salia =

Roman army officer

Flavius Salia (fl. 4th century) was a Roman military officer who was appointed consul in AD 348.

== Biography ==
Salia was of Germanic descent and a devout Christian. He rose through the military ranks to become the Magister equitum under the emperor Constans from AD 344 to 348. Constans dispatched him after the Council of Sardica, along with two bishops, Vincentius of Capua and Euphrates of Cologne, to the court of his brother, Constantius II, at Antioch, with a letter from Constans demanding that Constantius restore the Patriarch of Alexandria, Athanasius, to his see.

Then in AD 348, Salia was made consul posterior alongside Flavius Philippus.

== Sources ==
- Martindale, John R.; Jones, A. H. M.; Morris, John, eds. (1971). The Prosopography of the Later Roman Empire: Volume I, AD 260–395. Cambridge: Cambridge University Press. ISBN 0-521-07233-6.

Political offices
Preceded by Vulcacius Rufinus II; Flavius Eusebius	Roman consul 349 with Flavius Philippus	Succeeded by Ulpius Limenius II; Aconius Catullinus
