= Constantina =

Daughter of Roman emperor Constantine I

- Augusta
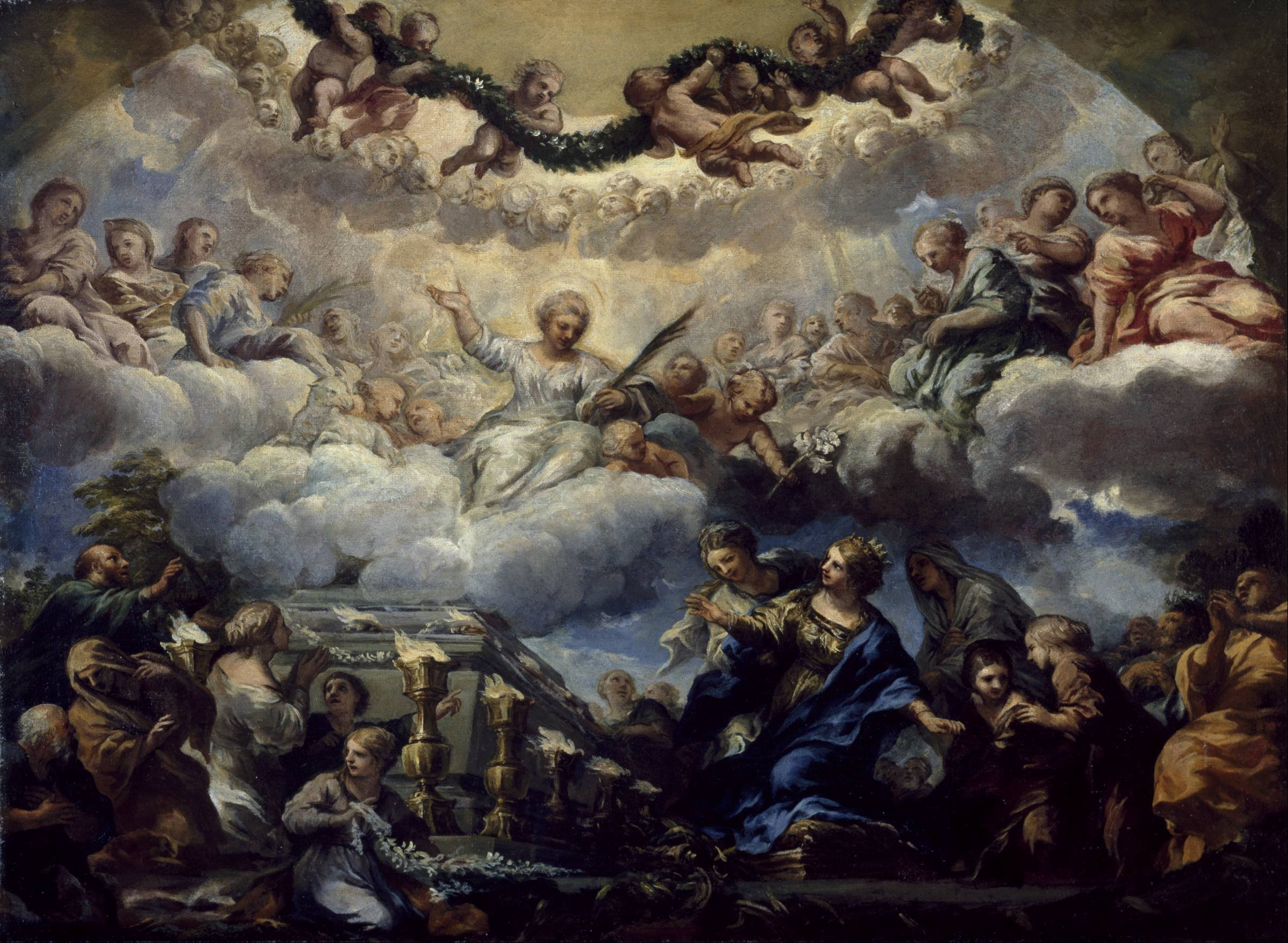
- Saint Constantia's Vision before the Tomb of Saints Agnes and Emerentiana, by Pietro da Cortona
- Born: 307-317
- Died: 354; Caeni Gallicani, Bithynia
- Burial: Santa Costanza, near Via Nomentana, Rome
- Spouse: Hannibalianus; Constantius Gallus
- Issue: Constantia; Anastasia
- Dynasty: Constantinian
- Father: Constantine the Great
- Mother: Fausta

Flavia Valeria Constantina (Note: Full name attested in an inscription.) (also sometimes called Constantia and Constantiana; Greek: Κωνσταντίνα; b. after 307/before 317 – d. 354), later known as Saint Constance, was the eldest daughter of Roman emperor Constantine the Great and his second wife Fausta, daughter of Emperor Maximian. Constantina may have received the title of Augusta from her father, and is venerated as a saint, having developed a medieval legend wildly at variance with what is known of her actual character.

== Life ==
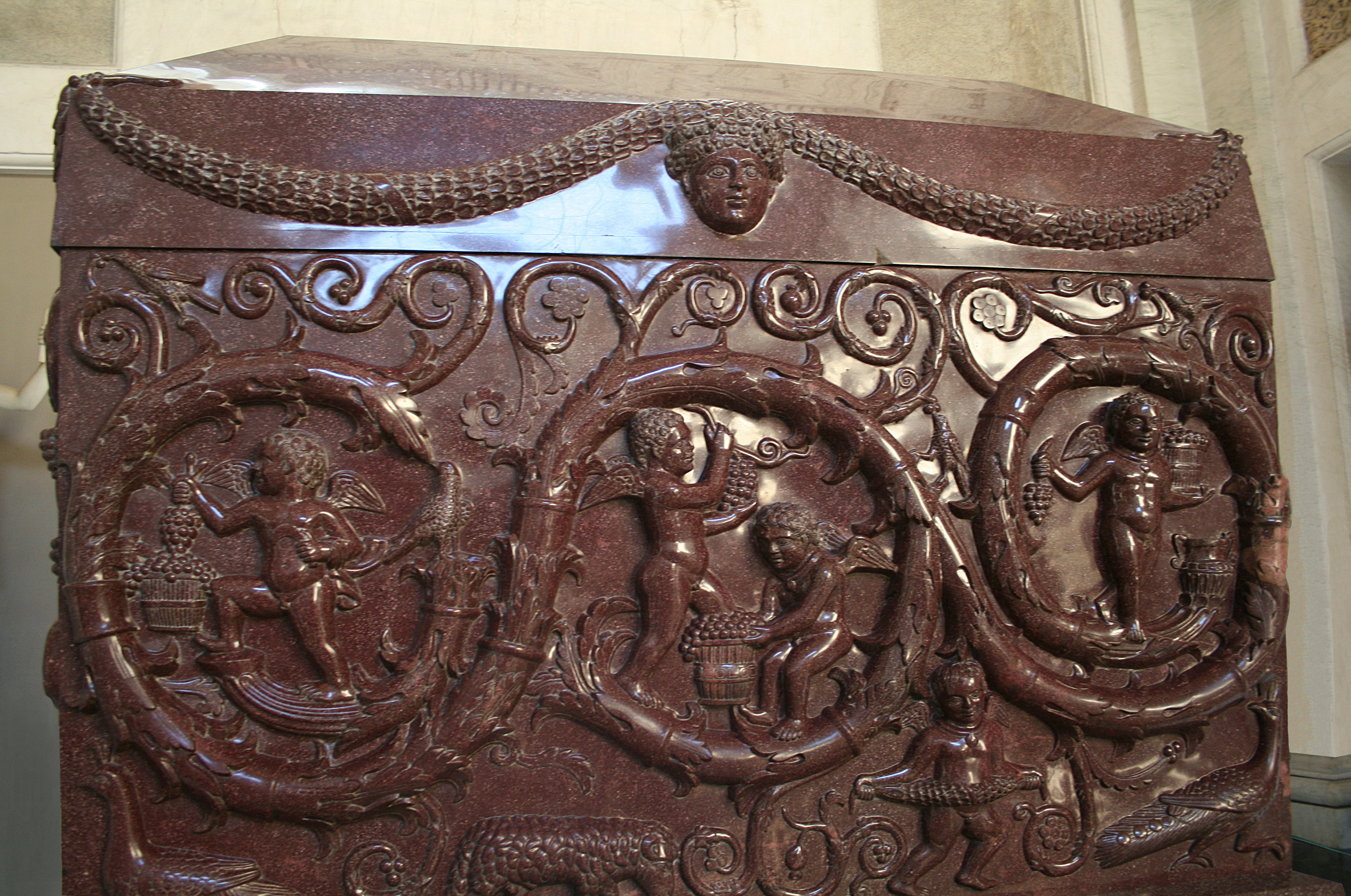
Sarcophagus of Constantina, sculpted around AD 340. Formerly in the Mausoleo di Santa Costanza, part of the complex of Sant'Agnese fuori le mura in Rome, it is now on display at the Museo Pio-Clementino in the Vatican City.

Some time before mid 320s, Constantina was born to the emperor Constantine and empress Fausta. She was sister to Constantine II, Constans, Constantius II, Helena and half-sister to Crispus. In 335, Constantina married her cousin Hannibalianus, son of Flavius Dalmatius, whom Constantine I had created Rex Regum et Ponticarum Gentium, "King of Kings and Ruler of the Pontic Tribes". From her first marriage, Constantina may have had a daughter, Constantia, who later married Memmius Vitrasius Orfitus and become mother of Rusticiana, wife of Quintus Aurelius Symmachus. After Constantine died, great purges of the imperial family occurred and her husband was executed in 337.

For the second time, Constantius II gave Constantina to Hannibalianus' cousin, and her own half cousin Gallus. Gallus was created a Caesar of the East and his name changed to Constantius Gallus to further his legitimacy around 349/350, which also presumably was the time of their marriage. Gallus was twenty-five or twenty-six at the time, whereas Constantina was substantially his senior. Her second marriage produced a daughter Anastasia, whose full name and fate are unknown.

Constantina and Constantius Gallus were then sent from Rome to Syria at Antioch to govern that portion of the Eastern Roman Empire. She would not return to Rome until her death. In AD 354, when Constantius called for Gallus, the caesar sent Constantina to her brother, with the purpose to mitigate his position in Constantius' consideration. While on her way to meet with Constantius II, she died at Caeni Gallicani in Bithynia (Asia Minor). The cause of her death was a sudden high fever of unknown cause. Her body was sent back to Rome and entombed near Via Nomentana in a mausoleum her father, Emperor Constantine I, had started building for her. This mausoleum would later become known as the church of Santa Costanza, when Constantina was venerated as a saint. Her porphyry sarcophagus is on exhibit in the Vatican Museums.

== Political role ==
Upon marrying Hannibalianus her father allegedly made her Augusta. However, this claim is preserved only by Philostorgius among ancient sources and has been debated. After her husband was executed in AD 337, Constantina disappeared from the imperial record until AD 350. This was when Magnentius revolted against her brother Constantius II causing political upheaval in the Western parts of the empire. This prompted her to become directly involved in the revolt. Using her Augusta status and political network, she claimed Vetranio as Caesar, encouraging him to challenge Magnentius. This allowed her to protect her own interests and preserve her power.

Not only did Constantina exercise influence on her own, she was inherently, as a female member of the imperial Roman family, a political tool. As a widow, she could be offered in marriage to secure political alliance. This happened twice. In AD 350, in order to attempt a peaceful compromise by arranging marriage, Magnentius offered to marry Constantina and have Constantius II marry his daughter. But Constantius II refused this offer. Shortly after, in AD 351, Constantius II used Constantina for a different political purpose and gave her in marriage to Constantius Gallus who was made Caesar in the Eastern Roman Empire and they moved to Antioch.

The Passio Artemii (12) alleges that the marriage was meant to ensure Gallus' loyalty but it may have had at least as much to do with Constantina who, besides having known power as Constantine's daughter and Hannibalianus' wife, had prompted the opposition of Vetranio to Magnentius, and whose hand had been sought from Constantius by ambassadors of Magnentius himself.

The marriage, besides benefiting Constantius, extricated her from a dangerous situation in the empire and placed her in a position from which she might control the younger and inexperienced Caesar, an interest she shared with Constantius. On the other hand, it is possible that Constantius saw the marriage as a way to remove his intrusive – perhaps treasonous – sister from the volatile west. If the mention in the Passio Artemii (11) of letters from Constantina to her brother preserves a genuine tradition, it is possible Constantina even initiated the proposal that she marry Gallus.

Gallus ruled over the East from Antioch, and his purpose was to keep under control the Sassanid menace. Gallus, however, alienated the support of his subjects with his arbitrary and merciless rule. Constantina supported her husband. It is in Antioch that Constantina appeared to become politically active in the way of imperial Roman women. According to Ammianus Marcellinus, she largely operated hidden from the public view but was still sinister, brutal and controlling. He suggests that she called for the murder of several people: during an interrogation about people killed on his orders, "Gallus...had just enough strength to reply that most of them had been massacred at the insistence of his wife Constantina". She accepted a necklace as a bribe for securing the execution of a nobleman. In ancient historical sources, she was generally perceived as a cruel and violent but politically dynamic figure.

When, after receiving the complaints of the Anthiocheans, Constantius II summoned both Gallus and Constantina, but according to Ammianus Constantina, in her last attempt at using her political power, journeyed ahead to meet with her brother the emperor to try to pacify him in his conflict with her husband Constantius Gallus, during which she died from illness.

== Character assessment ==
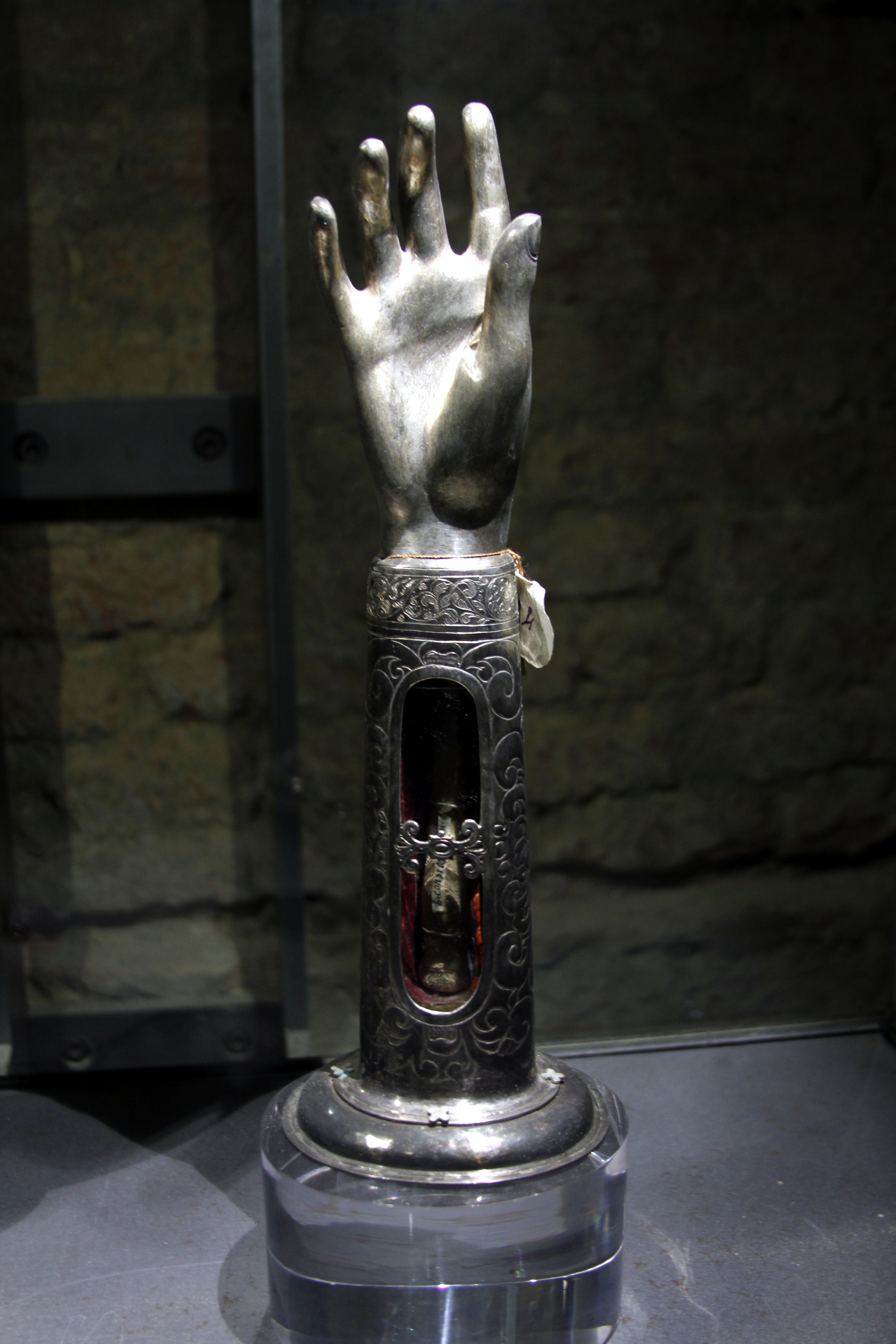
Arm reliquary of Saint Constantina, Santa Maria della Scala in Siena.

Ammianus Marcellinus portrayed Constantina as cruel, violent, and arrogant: "her pride was swollen beyond measure; she was a Fury in mortal form, incessantly adding fuel to her husband's rage, and as thirsty for human blood as he".

Later in the 18th century, Edward Gibbon, influenced by Ammianus Marcellinus' rhetoric, likened Constantina to one of the infernal furies tormented with an insatiate thirst of human blood. The historian said that she encouraged the violent nature of Gallus rather than persuading him to show reason and compassion. Gibbon stated that her vanity was accentuated while the gentle qualities of a woman were absent in her makeup when she would have accepted a pearl necklace in return for consenting to the execution of a worthy nobleman.

== Medieval legend ==
In the Middle Ages, Constantina developed a legend, connected with the life of Agnes of Rome; the origins of this are unclear, though she was certainly buried in a mausoleum, Santa Costanza, attached to the large Constantinian basilica over the catacomb where Agnes is buried. The mausoleum survives largely intact, but now only parts of the wall of the basilica survive. In the version told by the Golden Legend, she caught leprosy, and was then miraculously cured when praying at Agnes' tomb, which is supposed to be at the site of the later Basilica of Sant'Agnese fuori le mura alongside the earlier basilica. (The Ethiopian Synaxarium describes Constantine I sending his sick daughter to Abu Mena to be cured, and credits her with finding Menas' body, after which Constantine ordered the construction of a church at the site.) Constantina took a vow of chastity, and converted her fiancé Gallicanus, and eventually left her wealth to her servants John and Paul for them to spend on Christian works. The story, with considerable elaborations, survives in various literary forms, and as a figure from the life of Agnes, Constantina appears in the late 14th enamelled scenes on the Royal Gold Cup in the British Museum.

== Cult and veneration ==
Pope Alexander IV placed the relics of Constantina under a new altar. Today, her grave is in the Church of Santa Costanza in Rome. In the 16th century Constantina, Attica, and Artemia were recorded for the first time in martyrologies. The feast day of Constantina is 18 February. Attica and Artemia are venerated, in addition, on 28 January and 17 February. Together, they are venerated on 25 February and 25 June.
