= Vulcacius Rufinus =

Vulcacius Rufinus (died 368) was a Roman politician, related to the Constantinian dynasty.

== Biography ==
Rufinus' siblings were Neratius Cerealis, Galla (the mother of Constantius Gallus), and the mother of Maximus. A pagan, he was pontifex maximus, consularis for Numidia, comes ordinis primi intra consistorium under the Emperor Constans I or his brother Constantius II, comes per Orientem, Aegypti et Mesopotamiae per easdem vice sacra iudicans from 5 April 342, praetorian prefect of Italy from 344 to 347 (between the prefectures of Fulvius Placidus and Ulpius Limenius), consul ordinarius prior in 347 with Flavius Eusebius, and praetorian prefect of Illyricum between 347 and 352.

During Rufinus' prefecture of Illyricum, Magnentius overthrew Constans. The usurper sent Rufinus, along with Marcellinus, Maximus and Nunechius, as envoys to Constantius II. Constantius had the other three men arrested, but Rufinus retained his liberty and his office. In 354, after the fall of Magnentius, he was praetorian prefect of Gaul, living in the capital Trier, but was replaced by Gaius Ceionius Rufius Volusianus Lampadius. Rufinus may have lost his post because his relative Constantius Gallus had fallen into disgrace with the Emperor.

Between 365 and 368 he was the praetorian prefect for Italy and Africa, succeeding Claudius Mamertinus, and of Gaul from 366 to 368. He died in service.

== Bibliography ==
- Martindale, John R.; Jones, A. H. M.; Morris, John, eds. (1971). The Prosopography of the Later Roman Empire: Volume I, AD 260–395. Cambridge: Cambridge University Press. pp. 782–783. ISBN 0-521-07233-6.

Political offices
Preceded by Constantius Augustus IV; Constans Augustus III	Roman consul 347 with Eusebius	Succeeded by Philippus; Salia
