= Philippus (consul 348) =

Roman politician

Flavius Philippus (Greek: Φίλιππος; fl. 340s–350s) was an official under the Roman emperor Constantius II.

== Biography ==
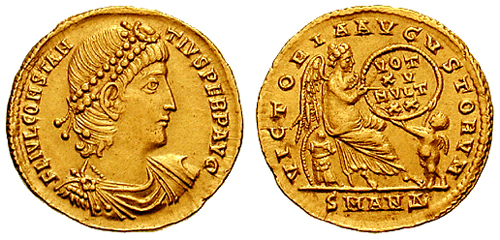
Coin of Emperor Constantius II, who promoted Philippus to high office.

Son of a sausage-maker, Philippus rose in social standing, becoming a notarius. In 346, he became Praetorian Prefect of the East under Emperor Constantius, allegedly because of the influence of the court eunuchs. Philippus then obtained the consulate in 348.

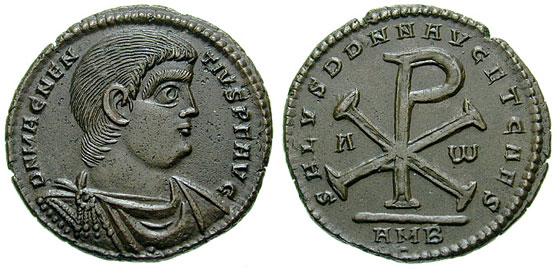
Coin of the usurper Magnentius.

In 351, when Constantius was facing the rebellion of the usurper Magnentius, Philippus was sent to the rebel camp, formally to negotiate a peace, but actually to discover the military readiness of the enemy. Philippus then addressed the rebel army, accusing them of ingratitude towards the Constantinian dynasty, and proposing that Magnentius leave Italy and keep only Gaul. When Magnentius tried to take the town of Siscia, Philippus was held hostage by the usurper.

It is unknown whom he married, but his grandson, Flavius Anthemius, also became Praetorian Prefect of the East.

Preceded by Vulcacius Rufinus; Eusebius	Roman consul 348 with Flavius Salia	Succeeded by Ulpius Limenius; Aconius Catullinus
