= Volusius Venustus =

Volusius Venustus (floruit 4th century) was an aristocrat of the Roman Empire.

== Biography ==
Volusius Venustus set up a monument in the forum of Canosa in honour of Constantine I and his two sons (the fact that only two sons are honoured means that the monument was set up between 317 and 333, less the period between 324 and 326). This monument is a clue that he was from this city in southern Italia; it also marks his office, the one of corrector Apuliae et Calabriae (governor of the region corresponding to the present-day Apulia).

A Venustus is attested in the year 362, as a member of a senatorial delegation to Antioch to the emperor Julian, who on this occasion nominated this Venustus as vicarius Hispaniarum (362-363). In 370, together with Vettius Agorius Praetextatus and Minervius, he comprised a senatorial legation to the Emperor Valentinian I, asking him not to torture those senators involved in trials. According to a long-standing reconstruction by Otto Seeck, the two previous officers were the same person, who is to be identified with Venustus, the father of Virius Nicomachus Flavianus and grandfather of Nicomachus Flavianus the younger, and maybe another nephew called Venustus. This Venustus was, therefore, related to the orator Quintus Aurelius Symmachus (also father-in-law of Flavianus the younger), since he was brother-in-law of Lucius Aurelius Avianius Symmachus, father of Aurelius. However, recently this interpretation has been questioned. The most-widely accepted reconstruction is that the Venustus corrector Apuliae et Calabriae and the vicarius Hispaniarum are two different persons; the first, Volusius Venustus, would be a member of the Ragonii, belonging to the generation between Lucius Ragonius Venustus consul in 240 and the Lucius Ragonius Venustus who performed a taurobolium in 390; the second, Venustus, might have been Nicomachus' father.

== Bibliography ==
- Marcella Chelotti, Vincenza Morizio, Marina Silvestrini, Francesco Grelle, Mario Pani, Le epigrafi romane di Canosa, Edipuglia, 1990, ISBN 88-7228-065-6, pp. 21–23.
- Rita Lizzi Testa, Senatori, popolo, papi: il governo di Roma al tempo dei Valentiniani, Edipuglia, 2004, ISBN 88-7228-392-2, p. 268.
