= Saturnalia (Macrobius) =

Latin work by Macrobius

Seven Books of the Saturnalia
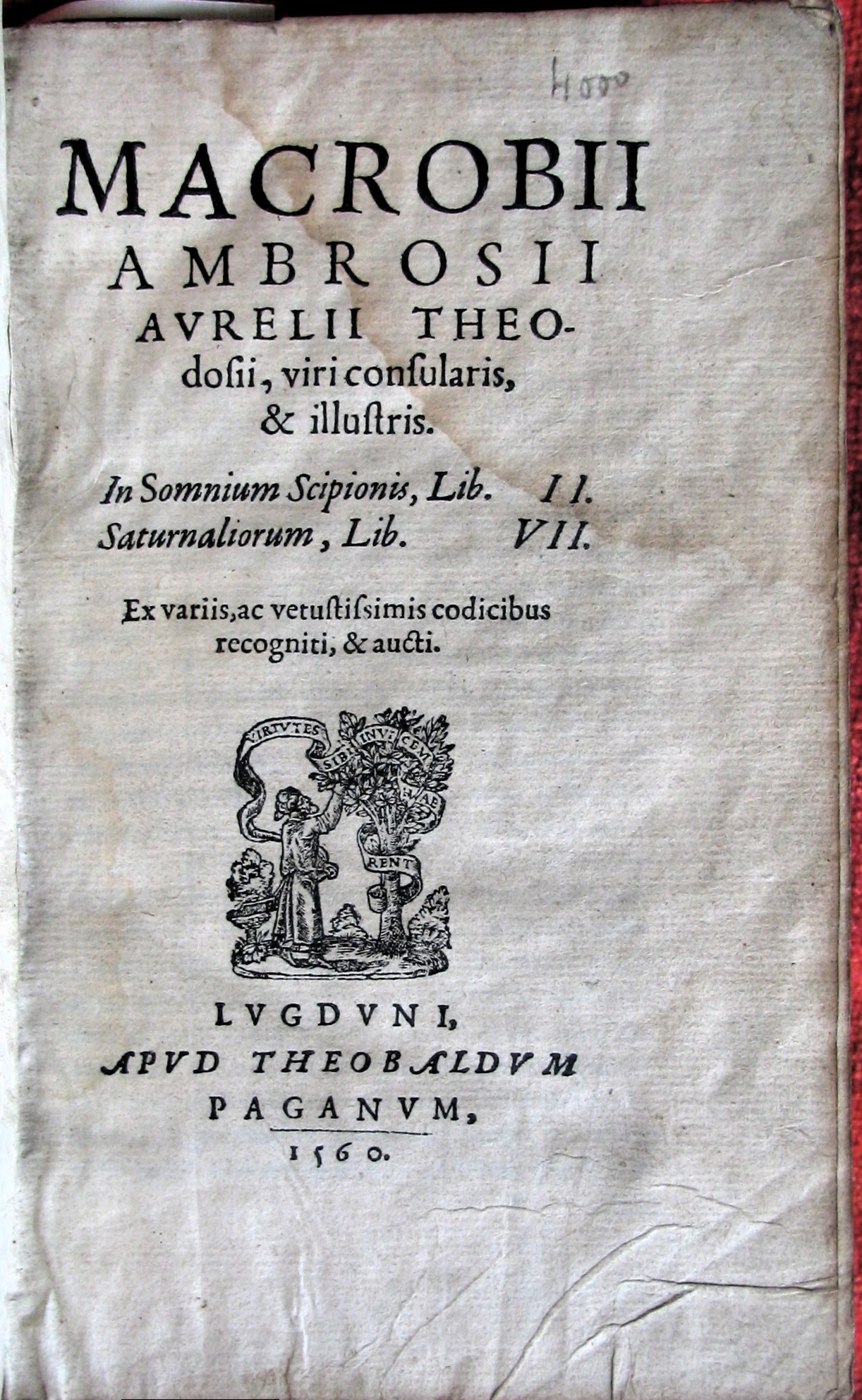
- A 1560 printed edition of Macrobius's Saturnalia, included alongside his commentary on Cicero's Somnium Scipionis.
- Author: Macrobius
- Original title: Saturnaliorum Libri Septem
- Language: Latin
- Genre: philosophy, Platonic dialogue, Symposium
- Publication date: c. 431

Saturnalia (Latin: Saturnaliorum Libri Septem, "Seven Books of the Saturnalia") is a work written after c. 431 CE by the Roman provincial Macrobius. The Saturnalia consists of an account of the discussions held at the house of Vettius Agorius Praetextatus during the holiday of the Saturnalia. It contains a great variety of curious historical, mythological, critical, antiquarian and grammatical discussions.

== Background ==
Saturnalia is a late example of the Symposium genre pioneered by Plato and Xenophon. It is written as a series of scholarly dialogues at fictional banquets held over the eve of Saturnalia and three days of the holiday, December 16–19. In each book, one of the characters does the bulk of the speaking on the topic.

== Principal Characters ==
Macrobius placed characters from different times and places in an anachronistic gathering. Some are historical figures, primarily from the 4th century in the Roman Empire. Others are fictional or very loosely associated with obscure figures.

- Praetextatus: Vettius Agorius Praetextatus, a wealthy pagan aristocrat.
- Flavianus: Virius Nicomachus Flavianus, vicar of Africa, prefect and consul.
- Symmachus: Quintus Aurelius Symmachus, orator, author, and politician.
- Decius: Caecina Decius Albinus Iunior, prefect of Rome and father of Caecina Decius Aginatius Albinus.
- Rufius Albinus: prefect of Rome.
- Eustathius: Greek philosopher.
- Evangelus: an aristocrat from Tibur.
- Avienus: a young aristocrat.
- Eusebius: a Greek teacher of rhetoric.
- Servius: a grammarian.
- Dysarius: a physician.
- Horus: a former boxer and Cynic philosopher.

== Contents ==
The first book is devoted to an inquiry as to the origin of the Saturnalia and the festivals of Janus, which leads to a history and discussion of the Roman calendar, and to an attempt to derive all forms of worship from that of the Sun. The second book begins with a collection of bons mots, to which all present make their contributions, many of them being ascribed to Cicero and Augustus; a discussion of various pleasures, especially of the senses, then seems to have taken place, but almost the whole of this is lost. The third, fourth, fifth and sixth books are devoted to Virgil, dwelling respectively on his learning in religious matters, his rhetorical skill, his debt to Homer (with a comparison of the art of the two) and to other Greek writers, and the nature and extent of his borrowings from the earlier Latin poets. The latter part of the third book is taken up with a dissertation upon luxury and the sumptuary laws intended to check it, which is probably a dislocated portion of the second book. The seventh book consists largely of the discussion of various physiological questions.

The primary value of the work lies in the facts and opinions quoted from earlier writers. The form of the Saturnalia is copied from Plato's Symposium and Gellius's Noctes atticae; the chief authorities (whose names, however, are not quoted) are Gellius, Seneca the philosopher, Plutarch (Quaestiones conviviales), Athenaeus and the commentaries of Servius and others on Virgil.

== Editions and translations ==
- Macrobius, Ambrosius Aurelius Theodosius. Seven Books of the Saturnalia. [Publisher Not Identified, 1400–1499]. Pdf. Library of Congress.

Illuminated codex from the Plutei Collection of the Biblioteca Medicea Laurenziana in Florence.

- Macrobius. The Saturnalia. Translated by Percival Vaughan Davies. Columbia University Press, 1969.

Loeb Classical Library (LCL)

- Macrobius. Saturnalia, Volume I: Books 1-2. Edited and translated by Robert A. Kaster. LCL 510. Cambridge: Harvard University Press (HUP), 2011.
- ---. Saturnalia, Volume II: Books 3-5. Edited and translated by R.A. Kaster. LCL 511. HUP, 2011.
- ---. Saturnalia, Volume III: Books 6-7. Edited and translated by R.A. Kaster. LCL 512. HUP, 2011.

Includes Index of Names, Topics, and Index Locorum.
