= Aconius Catullinus Philomatius =

Roman senator

Aconius Catullinus
- Born: Roma, Roman Empire
- Died: 4th century
- Other name: Philomatius
- Occupation: politician
- Years active: 338-349 CE
- Office: Praetorian prefect (341); Prefect of Rome (342–344); Consul (349)
- Children: Aconia Fabia Paulina

Aconius Catullinus signo Philomatius (fl. 338–349 AD) was a Roman senator who held high state offices under the emperor Constans.

== Biography ==
Aconius (or Aco) Catullinus was probably a son of the identically-named senator who served as governor of Africa in 317–318. He was a pagan.

He was consul suffectus at an unknown date, and served as governor (praeses) of Gallaecia in Hispania before 338. A dedication of his to Jupiter Optimus Maximus during his term of office has been preserved (CIL II, 2635). In 338–339, Catullinus served as vicarius of Africa, and is attested on 24 June 341 as praetorian prefect of Italy. From 6 July 342 to 11 April 344, he served as urban prefect of Rome. A law (Codex Theodosianus, 16.10.3) addressed to (and likely suggested by) him, dated 1 November 342 during his term of office, concerns the preservation of pagan temples. Catullinus was consul ordinarius in 349.

Catullinus had a daughter, Aconia Fabia Paulina, who married the senator Vettius Agorius Praetextatus.

According to the Chronograph of 354, Catullinus bore the informal name (signum) Philomatius, which some authors have emended to Philomathius (meaning love of learning), but Salway suggested instead Philematius, from the Greek φίλημα (kiss).

== Footnotes ==
Political offices
Preceded by Philippus; Salia	Roman consul 349; With: Ulpius Limenius	Succeeded by Sergius; Nigrinianus
Preceded by Antonius Marcellinus	Praetorian prefect of Italy; 341	Succeeded by M. Furius Placidus
Preceded by Lollianus Mavortius	Prefect of Rome; 342–344	Succeeded by Quintus Rusticus
