= Portico Dii Consentes =

Ancient structure in Rome, Italy

Porticus Deorum Consentium
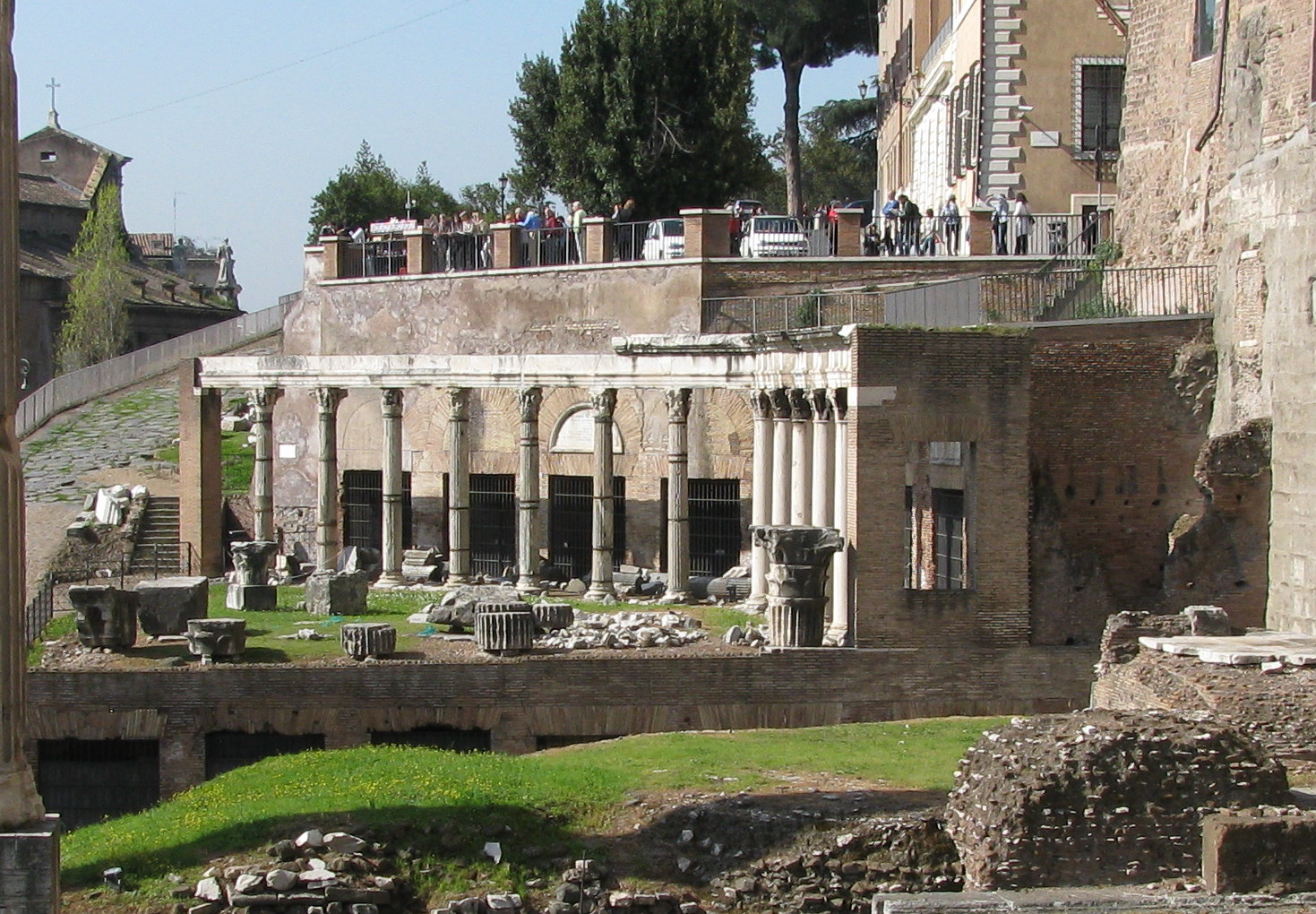
- Porticus Deorum Consentium.

- Shown within Augustan Rome
- Interactive map of Porticus Deorum Consentium
- 41°53′N 12°29′E

The Portico Dii Consentes (Latin: Porticus Deorum Consentium; Italian: Portico degli Dei Consenti), also known as the Area of the Dii Consentes or the Harmonious Gods, was an ancient structure located at the bottom of the ancient Roman road that leads up to the Capitol in Rome, Italy. The Clivus Capitolinus ("Capitoline Rise") turned sharply at the head of the Roman Forum where this portico of marble and composite material was discovered and re-erected in 1835.

== History ==
It was last rebuilt in AD 367 by Vettius Praetextus and was thus the last functioning pagan shrine in the Forum (such shrines had been forbidden by law more than a decade earlier). The Portico contained two distinct floors.The lower floor was constructed by the Emperor Titus alongside the Temple of Vespasian. This lower floor contained 7 rooms upon the ground level which are assumed by modern scholars to be shopfronts. With the completion of the Temple of Vespasian, public access to the Tabularium via the Forum had been blocked off. As a result Domitian built a second level of the portico composed of eight rooms, one of which contained a staircase allowing forum access to the Tabularium. These eight rooms on the second level are presumed to have been clerks offices. Later on Hadrian added on to the portico by adding a colonnade of 13 pillars. Between each of these pillars it is believed that a bronze statue of each of the Dii Consentes stood, overlooking the Roman Forum. The structures proximity to the Temple of Saturn (then a mint) and the Tabularium (a records keeping office) showcase the Dii Consentes importance in monitoring financial and administrative wrongdoing of the Roman Empire.

== See also ==
- List of ancient monuments in Rome

Preceded by Curia Julia	Landmarks of Rome; Portico Dii Consentes	Succeeded by Porticus Octaviae
