= Helena (wife of Julian) =

Roman empress in 360

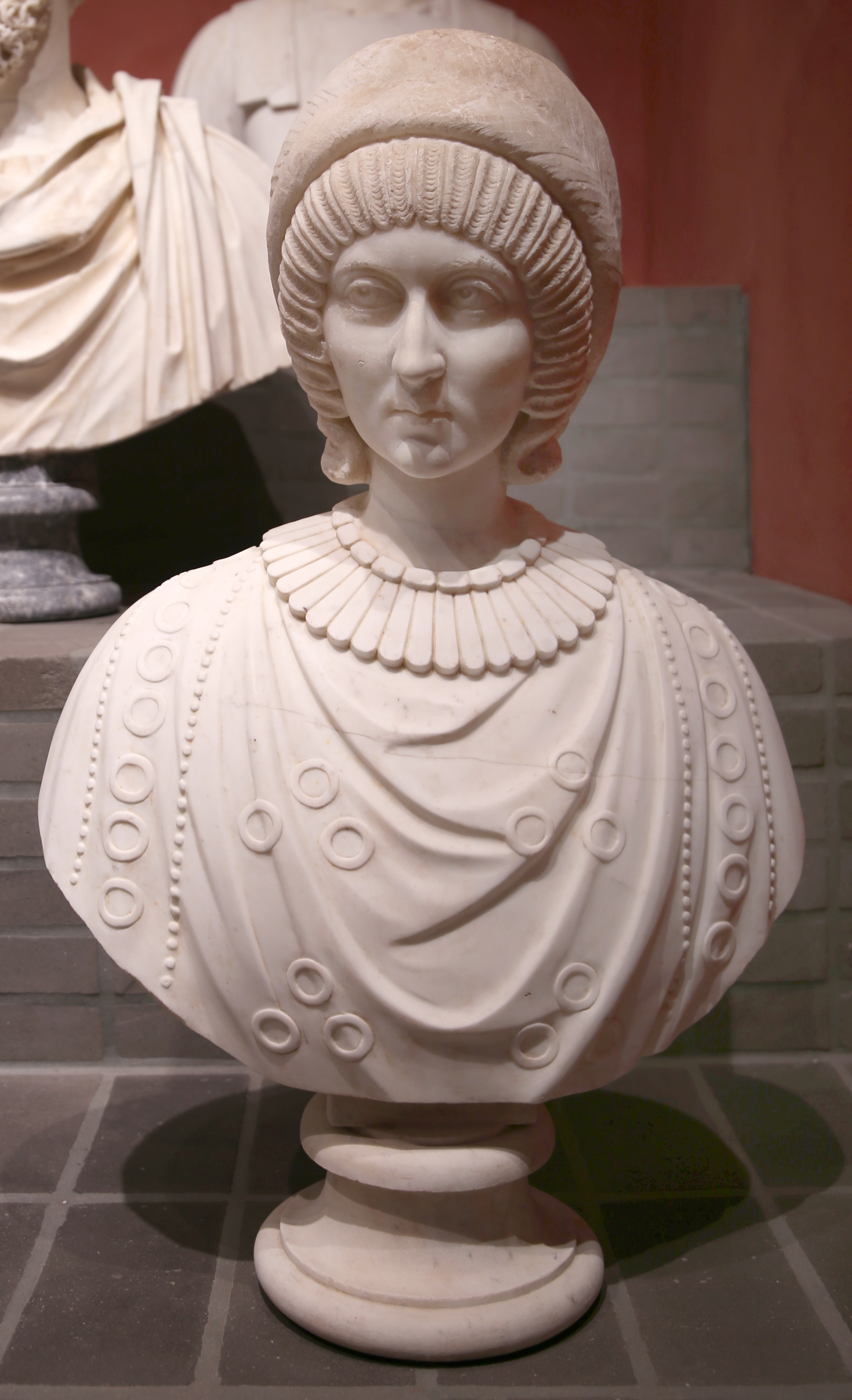
- Portrait of Helena (ancient head on an 18th-century bust from the studio of Bartolomeo Cavaceppi)

Roman empress
- Tenure: 360 (alongside Eusebia)
- Died: 360
- Spouse: Emperor Julian
- Dynasty: Constantinian
- Father: Constantine the Great
- Mother: Fausta

Helena (Greek: Έλένη; died 360) was a Roman Empress by marriage to Julian, Roman emperor in 360–363. She was briefly his Empress consort when Julian was proclaimed Augustus by his troops in 360. She died prior to the resolution of his conflict with Constantius II.

== Family ==
Helena was a daughter of Constantine I and Fausta. She was sister to Constantine II, Constantius II, Constans and Constantina and half-sister of Crispus.

Her paternal grandparents were Constantius Chlorus and Helena. Her maternal grandparents were Maximian and Eutropia.

== Marriage ==
On 6 November 355, Julian was declared Caesar by Constantius II. The new Caesar was a paternal first cousin to Helena and her siblings. He was a son of Julius Constantius and his second wife Basilina. His paternal grandparents were Constantius Chlorus and his second wife Flavia Maximiana Theodora. At the time of his declaration Julian was the only viable candidate for this position, at least within the ranks of the Constantinian dynasty. The various other males of the family had died out.

The marriage of Helena and Julian took place days after his proclamation. The marriage confirmed the alliance of Julian to her brother. According to Ammianus Marcellinus: "This happened on the sixth of November of the year when Arbetio and Lollianus were consuls. Then, within a few days, Helena, the maiden sister of Constantius, was joined in the bonds of wedlock to the Caesar." Zosimus reports: "Constantius declared him Caesar, gave him in marriage his sister Helena, and sent him beyond the Alps. But being naturally distrustful, he could not believe that Julian would be faithful to him, and therefore sent along with him Marcellus and Sallustius, to whom, and not to Caesar, he committed the entire administration of that government." Eutropius narrates: "Constantius then remained sole ruler and emperor over the Roman dominions. He then sent into Gaul, with the authority of Caesar, his cousin Julian, the brother of Gallus, giving him his sister in marriage, at a time when the barbarians had stormed many towns and were besieging others, when there was everywhere direful devastation, and when the Roman Empire was tottering in evident distress." According to Socrates of Constantinople: "The emperor recalled him [Julian], and after created him Caesar; in addition to this, uniting him in marriage to his own sister Helen, he sent him against the barbarians. For the barbarians whom the Emperor Constantius had engaged as auxiliary forces against the tyrant Magnentius, having proved of no use against the usurper, were beginning to pillage the Roman cities. And inasmuch as he [Julian] was young he [Constantius] ordered him to undertake nothing without consulting the other military chiefs."

Sozomen apparently confused Helena with her sister, calling her Constantia He narrates: "Constantius recalled him [Julian], and proclaimed him Caesar, promised him his sister Constantia in marriage, and sent him to Gaul; for the barbarians whose aid had been hired by Constantius previously against Magnentius, finding that their services were not required, had portioned out that country. As Julian was very young, generals, to whom the prudential affairs were turned over, were sent with him; but as these generals abandoned themselves to pleasure, he was present as Caesar, and provided for the war." Philostorgius reports: "He [Constantius] summoned Gallus' brother Julian from Ionia and appointed him Caesar in Milan, giving his own sister Helena to him as his wife and taking oaths with him. He then sent him to Gaul to watch over the realm there.". The marriage is also recorded in the Chronicon Paschale.

None of the primary sources mention the age of Helena at the time of her marriage. The History of the Decline and Fall of the Roman Empire by Edward Gibbon does comment on her age. "If we recollect that Constantine, the father of Helena, died above eighteen years before, in a mature old age, it will appear probable, that the daughter, though a virgin, could not be very young at the time of her marriage." Constantine I had died in 337 and Fausta in 326, which would mean Helena was at least twenty-nine years old when she married Julian.

== Caesar's wife ==
Helena seems to have followed her husband to Gaul and is next reported being pregnant with his child. This pregnancy ended in a miscarriage. Ammianus reports on further miscarriages: "Meanwhile Constantius' sister Helena, wife of Julian Caesar, had been brought to Rome under pretence of affection, but the reigning empress, Eusebia, was plotting against her; she herself had been childless all her life, and by her wiles she coaxed Helena to drink a rare potion, so that as often as she was with child she should have a miscarriage. For once before, in Gaul, when she had borne a baby boy, she lost it through machination: a midwife had been bribed with a sum of money, and as soon as the child was born cut the umbilical cord more than was right, and so killed it; such great pains and so much thought were taken that this most valiant man might have no heir." In the historical study "Ammianus Marcellinus and the Representation of Historical Reality" (1998) by Timothy Barnes, the birth of this stillborn son is estimated to 356. The miscarriage in Rome to 357. Barnes considers the story of the potion-induced miscarriages to be an allegation without further reference. Gibbon prefers to think that the miscarriages were accidental, but says that a definitive judgement on the question should be made by a physician, not a historian. In "A History of Medicine" (1995), Plinio Prioreschi dismisses the account as an example of a very common error in accounts of ancient medicine, "the attribution to drugs of properties that they could not have". In this case, a potion is consumed just once and keeps having effect for years. Prioreschi regards it as "an obvious impossibility in the light of modern pharmacology".

"The Propaganda of Power: The Role of Panegyric in Late Antiquity" (1998) contains a number of essays on the subject of panegyrics. Among them is "In praise of an Empress: Julian's speech of thanks to Eusebia" by Shaun Tougher, discussing a "Panegyric In Honour Of Eusebia" written by Julian himself. Tougher examines the relationship of Julian and Eusebia, commenting on whether Helena was affected by it. The historian considers that the image of a politically influential but "kind-hearted and philanthropic" Eusebia is directly based on her depiction in the works of Julian. According to Tougher, later historians have tended to accept this depiction with little to no questioning of it. He regards Eusebia to be the greatest threat to Julian for the duration of his term as Caesar. This rank effectively made Julian heir presumptive to the imperial throne. His position as such relied solely on Constantius and Eusebia remaining childless. Had an heir been born to the imperial couple, Julian could find himself outliving his usefulness to his imperial patrons. Tougher follows the example of senior historian Noël Aujoulat in considering the story of Helena's miscarriages being the result of abortifacients to be entirely plausible. Both historians consider Ammianus' allegations, casting Eusebia as the orchestrator of such a plot, should be taken into consideration and "not be lightly dismissed".

Whatever the case, "The Cambridge Ancient History" notes that the occasion of her presence in Rome were the Vicennalia of Constantius II, a celebration in honor of completing twenty years on the throne. Constantius and his Milan court moved to Rome for the occasion, marking the first and only known visit of this particular Augustus in the ancient capital of the Roman Empire. Constantius was following the examples of Diocletian and Constantine I who also visited Rome during their own Vicennalia. The presence of Constantius, Eusebia and Helena marked this as a dynastic display.

== Empress ==
By 360, Julian had restored peace to Gaul and reached a ceasefire with the Alamanni in particular. This secured the local borders for a while. Meanwhile, Constantius was involved in a conflict against Shapur II of the Sassanid Empire, another phase of the Roman–Persian Wars. He took advantage of the peace achieved by Julian, sending orders that would transfer many officers and units from Gaul to the Persian borders. The Petulantes, one of the units ordered to the eastern border, revolted and proclaimed Julian to be their Augustus. Soon their cause was joined by the rest of the Gallic troops. Julian accepted his proclamation with some initial reluctance. The exact date of his proclamations is unknown, estimated to February or March, 360. Helena served as his Empress consort. She is mentioned being alive at the time of his proclamation in Julian's Letter To The Senate And People of Athens: "Though my wife was then living, I happened to sleep alone in an adjoining upper chamber…" Julian gives no reason for the couple's sleeping apart.

This letter is the only survivor of a series, written in 361 and dispatched to several cities of the empire which Julian was attempting to win over. It describes an officer of Helena's guard contacting Julian with no prolonged journey mentioned, implying that at the start of the new reign she was attended by soldiers and in close proximity to her husband at Gaul. Her role in the conflict between her husband and brother is left unmentioned.

== Death ==
Helena is next mentioned by Ammianus as already deceased for some time: Julian "being now an Augustus, he celebrated quinquennial games… While these games were going on, he had sent to Rome the remains of his deceased wife Helena, to be laid to rest in his villa near the city on the Via Nomentana, where also her sister Constantina, formerly the wife of Gallus, was buried." In his assessment of Julian, Ammianus claims Julian practiced chastity and avoided sexual intercourse for the rest of his life. "He was so conspicuous for inviolate chastity that after the loss of his wife it is well known that he never gave a thought to love…" Barnes notes that Ammianus offers much praise of both Julian and Eusebia. In contrast, there is no such praise for Helena, nor an actual assessment of her.

The "Funeral Oration upon the Emperor Julian" by Libanius elaborates on the subject of Julian's chastity: "This was the pleasure our emperor reaped from the length of the nights, whilst others were following the business of Venus. But he was so far from inquiring where there was a fair daughter, or wife, that had he not once been tied by Juno with the bond of marriage, he would have ended his days knowing nothing of sexual intercourse but by name. But as it was he regretted his wife, yet did not touch another woman, either before or after her; being by his constitution enabled to be continent, and his constant occupation in the art of soothsaying concurring to require this restraint."

Gibbon notes that Helena's "pregnancy had been several times fruitless, and was at last fatal to herself." Gibbon used as his source another work by Libanius, "a very weak apology, to justify his hero [Julian] from a very absurd charge of poisoning his wife, and rewarding her physician with his mother's jewels." Libanius suggests that this rumour, which is only known from this work, was spread by the former praetorian prefect Helpidius and Polycles who he sought to discredit while praising Julian.

An entry of the Liber Pontificalis, the one covering Pope Liberius, mentions Helena being a devout Christian and an adherent of the Nicene Creed. However, like Sozomen, the entry writer confused her with her sister and calls her "Constantia Augusta".

Royal titles
Preceded by Eusebia	Roman Empress consort 360 with Eusebia (360)	Succeeded by Faustina
