= Maijastina Kahlos =

Finnish classicist

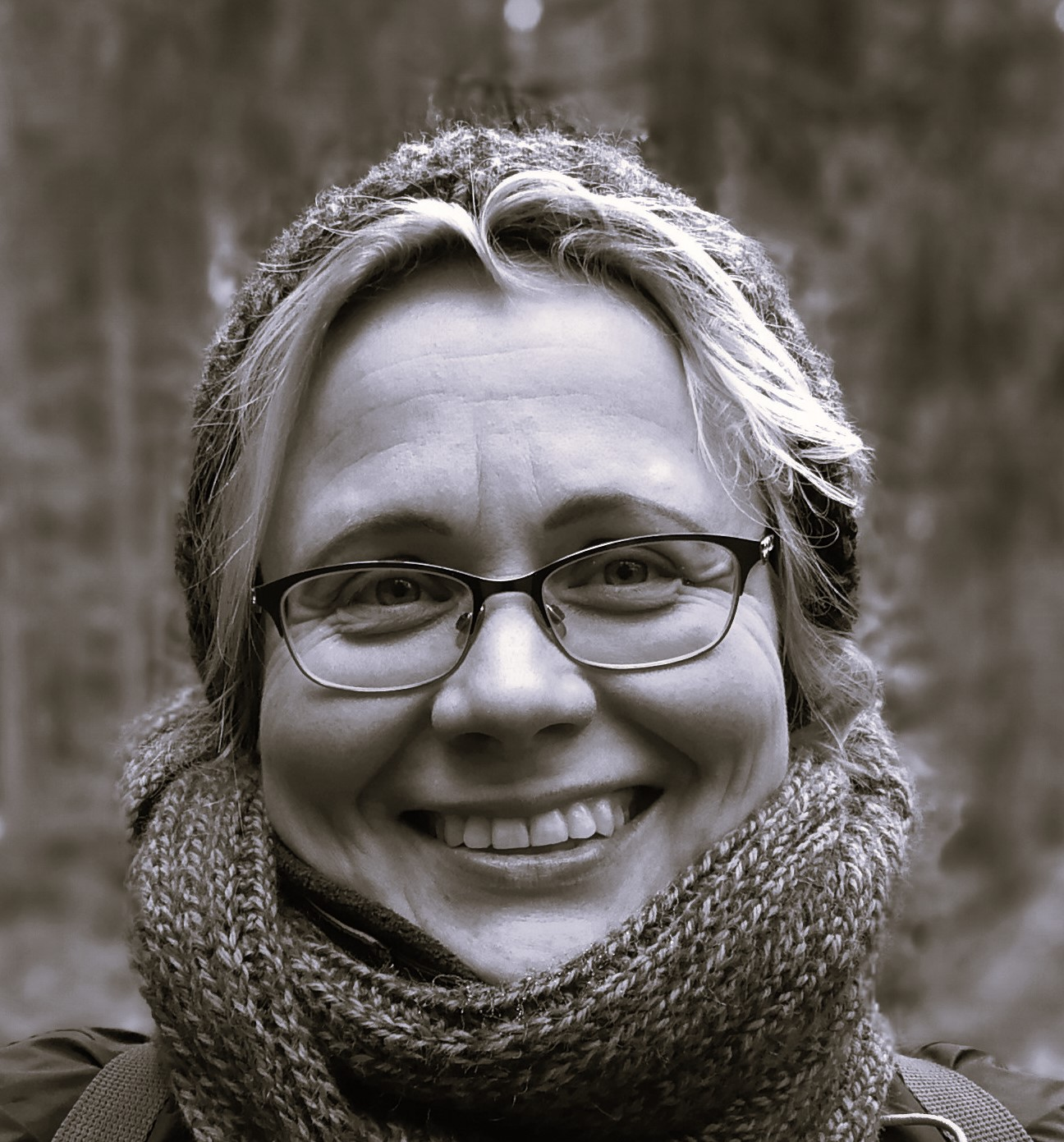
Maijastina Kahlos

Maijastina Kahlos is a Docent of Latin and Roman literature at the University of Helsinki and a Life Member of Clare Hall, University of Cambridge. She specialises in migration and mobility in the late antique Mediterranean, everyday life in ancient Rome, and ancient religion.

== Education ==
Kahlos received her PhD from the University of Helsinki in 1998. Her doctoral thesis was entitled, Saeculum Praetextati. She also received her master's degree from Helsinki.

== Career ==
Kahlos was a research fellow at the Helsinki Collegium for Advanced Studies and a researcher in the Academy of Finland Centre of Excellence (2011–2021). She was a visiting fellow at the Käte Hamburger Kolleg at Ruhr Universität Bochum in 2019. In 2001, she was a visiting fellow at the Friedrich Meinecke Institut at the Freie Universität Berlin. In 2021–2022 she was a visiting fellow at Clare Hall, University of Cambridge. Currently, Kahlos is principal researcher at Centro de Estudos Clássicos, University of Lisbon.

Kahlos has written four books covering various topics of late antique history and religion, most recently Religious Dissent in Late Antiquity, published by Oxford University Press (2020), described as "a welcome addition to the scholarship on late antique Christianity". She published the monograph Forbearance and Compulsion: The Rhetoric of Tolerance and Intolerance in Late Antiquity, in 2009. She has edited or co-edited six books, most recently Slavery in the Late Antique World, 150-700 CE (Cambridge University Press 2022).

== Bibliography ==
- Slavery in the Late Antique World, 150-700 CE (Cambridge University Press, 2022)
- Religious Dissent in Late Antiquity (Oxford University Press, 2020)
- Recognition and Religion: Contemporary and Historical Perspectives (2019)
- Emperors and the Divine: Rome and its Influence (2016)
- Spaces in Late Antiquity: Cultural, Theological and Archaeological Perspectives (2016)
- The Faces of the other: Religious Rivalry and Ethnic Encounters in the Later Roman World (Brepols, 2012)
- Forbearance and Compulsion: The Rhetoric of Tolerance and Intolerance in Late Antiquity (2009)
- Changes and Continuities in Christian Apologetic (2009)
- Debate and Dialogue: Christian and Pagan Cultures, c. 360-430 (2007)
- Vettius Agorius Praetextatus: Senatorial Life in Between (2002)
