= Ulpius Limenius =

Ulpius Limenius (died 8 April AD 349) was a Roman politician who was appointed consul in AD 349.

== Biography ==
Presumably a member of the Nobiles and a member of the eastern Senate, Limenius was appointed Proconsul of Constantinople in AD 342. He was an opponent of the rhetorician Libanius, and during his tenure as Proconsul he supported the accusations of Libanius’ rivals, charging him with practicing magic and treason, thereby forcing Libanius to leave Constantinople.

Although he was an eastern provincial, he was assigned the dual role of praetorian prefect of Italy (which the emperor Constans gave to him when he created the new Prefecture, splitting Italy off from the Praetorian prefecture of Illyricum) as well as praefectus urbi of Rome. He held these posts from 12 June 347 to 8 April 349. This unusual appointment not only reflected Constans' upbringing in Constantinople, but was also probably indicative of a long-standing relationship with a trusted subordinate. In AD 348, Limenius, as Urban Prefect, probably celebrated the Secular Games in the emperor's name, as Constans was absent from Rome.

During his time as Praetorian Prefect, he received a number of imperial laws to implement. One, dated 28 March 349, was aimed at the preservation of columns and monuments, as well as preventing the violation of tombs in the city of Rome. Another, dated 12 February 349, directed Limenius to crack down on counterfeiters.

In AD 349, Limenius was appointed consul prior alongside Aconius Catullinus Philomatius.

A pagan, Limenius died on 8 April 349, during his term as consul.

== Sources ==
- Chenault, Robert R., Rome Without Emperors: The Revival of a Senatorial City in the Fourth Century CE. (2008)
- Martindale, John R.; Jones, A. H. M.; Morris, John, eds. (1971). The Prosopography of the Later Roman Empire: Volume I, AD 260–395. Cambridge: Cambridge University Press. ISBN 0-521-07233-6.
- Story, Joseph, Commentaries on the Conflict of Laws, Foreign and Domestic, in Regard to Contracts, Rights, and Remedies, and Especially in Regard to Marriages, Divorces, Wills, Successions, and Judgements (1841)

Political offices
Preceded by Philippus; Salia	Roman consul 349 with Aconius Catullinus	Succeeded by Sergius; Nigrinianus
