= Collectio Avellana =

Collectio Avellana (the "Avellana Compilation") is a collection of 244 documents, dating from AD 367 to 553. It includes many imperial letters written to Catholic popes and others, imperial acts, papal letters and other documents that were gathered just after the mid-6th century.

Many of the documents have not been preserved in any other collection and contemporary copies have not survived. The oldest and best manuscript is in the Vatican Library, Vat. lat. 3787 (XI). It was this text which was edited by O. Guenther, and published as Epistolae Imperatorum Pontificum Aliorum Inde ab a. CCCLXVII usque DLIII datae Avellana Quae Dicitur Collectio, in Corpus Scriptorum Ecclesiasticorum Latinorum, Vol. 35, in 2 parts (Prague/Vienna/Leipzig, 1895).

The compiler(s) of Collectio Avellana aimed to fill the gaps of previous compilations. The author or authors must have had access to archives of the See of Rome, since they incorporated into the collection a variety of papal documents not in the Liber Pontificalis and imperial acts.

The documents include;

- CA 1-40 (regarding the papal elections of 366-367 and 418-419 (Bonifatius and Eulalius);
- CA 41-50 (regarding Pope Zosimus and the Pelagian controversy);
- CA 51-56 (regarding the church in Alexandria in June 460);
- CA 56-104 (regarding the start of the Acacian schism, with letters from Simplicius, Zeno, Acacius, Gelasius, Anastasius, Symmachus, Vigilius, Agapitus and Justinian dated to 540)
- CA 105-243 (regarding the end of the Acacian schism, with letters between Pope Hormisdas, the senate of Rome and the emperor Anastasius, among other documents).

The collection was given the name Avellana by the Ballerini brothers, after a Vatican manuscript, which was once held in the Santa Croce monastery in Fonte Avellana. In 2010, the Avellana Project was launched, with a view to completing a systematic study of the documents. The project was led by Dr. Alexander Evers, Assistant Professor of Classical Studies and Ancient History at Loyola University Chicago.
