= Censorius Datianus =

Censorius Datianus (fl. 337–365) was a politician of the Roman Empire, very influential under the rule of Emperor Constantius II (337-361).

== Biography ==
Datianus was the son of a servant in the public baths, and he climbed the social ladder to the position of senator in Constantinople and patricius of the Empire.

He had some properties in Antioch, where he built public baths, some gardens and some villas. He also exchanged letters with Libanius, from whom he received, between 355 and 365, 20 letters still conserved.

After serving under Emperor Constantine I, he became one of the main counsellors of his son Constantius II. As comes in 345, he wrote a letter to bishop Athanasius inviting him to return to his see in Alexandria, after being deposed by the Arians. In 351 was a member of the tribunal that put bishop Photinus on trial at the synod of Sirmium. In 354 he allowed Libanius to return to Antioch. In 358 he held the consulate, and he was still patricius as of 18 September of that year. After the death of Constantius and the rise to power of Julian (361-363), he lost influence.

In 363, now elderly, he was in Antioch when Julian died. Datianus followed the new Emperor Jovian to Ancyra, where he passed the winter. When Jovian died in February 364, Datianus wrote from Galatia to Nicaea, where the imperial court was gathered, to support the election of Valentinian I. That same month (February 364), the population of Antioch burned his house, and the city council was accused of doing nothing to fight the fire. The people of Antioch sent Datianus a letter asking for his pardon, through the intercession of Libanius; when Datianus gave his pardon, the people were so happy that Libanius, who brought the news, increased his prestige. Datianus is recorded as still alive in 365.

== Bibliography ==
- Scott Bradbury, Selected Letters of Libanius: From the Age of Constantius and Julian, Liverpool University Press, 2004, ISBN 0853235090, pp. 80–82.
- Martindale, John R.; Jones, A. H. M.; Morris, John, eds. (1971). "Datianus 1". The Prosopography of the Later Roman Empire: Volume I, AD 260–395. Cambridge: Cambridge University Press. pp. 243–244. ISBN 0-521-07233-6.
