= Eusebia (empress) =

Roman empress from 353 to 360

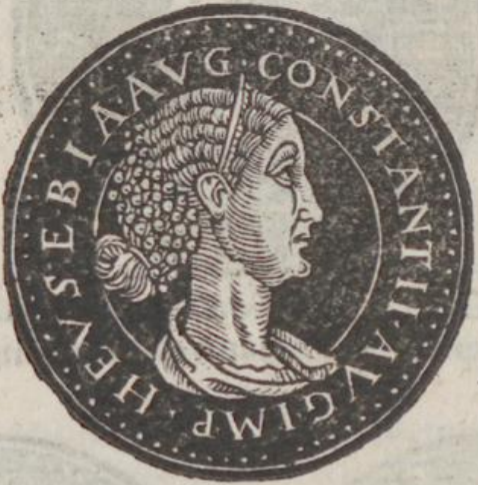
- Imaginary portrait (1615)

Roman empress
- Tenure: c. 353–360
- Born: Thessalonica
- Died: before 361
- Spouse: Constantius II
- Dynasty: Constantinian
- Father: Eusebius (probably)
- Religion: Arian Christianity

Eusebia (Greek: Εύσεβία, died before 361) was Roman empress as the second wife of Roman emperor Constantius II. The main sources for the knowledge about her life are Julian's panegyric "Speech of Thanks to the Empress Eusebia", as well as several remarks by the historian Ammianus Marcellinus.

== Family ==
Julian's "Panegyric In Honour Of Eusebia", the primary source for her family and ancestry, states that "she is of a family line that is pure Greek, from the purest of Greeks, and her city is the metropolis of Macedonia". Her father was the first member of the family to serve as a consul. The Panegyric never gives his name, but modern historians identify him with Flavius Eusebius, consul in 347. This Eusebius is identified elsewhere as a former Magister Equitum and Magister Peditum, which means he had served as a military commander of both the cavalry and infantry of the Roman army. The Prosopography of the Later Roman Empire considers it probable that his consulship came at the end of his military career. He is later styled "Comes."

The Panegyric mentions that Eusebia's father died some time before she married Constantius. Her mother, also unnamed in the speech, did not remarry, but "devoted herself to her children, and won a great reputation for prudence, so great indeed that whereas Penelope, while her husband was still on his travels and wanderings, was beset by those young suitors… no man however fair and tall or powerful and wealthy ever ventured to approach [Eusebia's mother] with any such proposals. And her daughter the Emperor deemed worthy to live by his side".

Eusebia's two brothers, Flavius Eusebius and Flavius Hypatius, both served as co-consuls in 359, which was attributed to her influence. Eusebius is described as a rhetor in an epistle by Libanius. Libanius identifies Eusebius as governor of the Hellespont c. 355. He was next sent to Antioch and then appointed governor of Bithynia, but held no known offices following his term as consul. Hypatius was possibly vicarius of the city of Rome in 363. Libanius mentions Hypatius appointed Praefectus urbi, c. 378–379. Gregory of Nazianzus mentions Hypatius visiting Constantinople in 381. He served as Praetorian prefect of both the Praetorian prefecture of Italy and the Praetorian prefecture of Illyricum, c. 382–383. An inscription of Gortyn, Crete praises him as the most illustrious of the consuls and praetorian prefects.

== Empress ==
The Panegyric of Julian places her marriage to Constantius prior to the defeat of the usurper Magnentius, who was dead by August 353. The marriage of Constantius and Eusebia may have occurred earlier in that year.

According to Julian's panegyric, Eusebia was able to influence her husband positively by encouraging him to be merciful. She was applauded for her wisdom and kindness, as well as her loyalty to Constantius, who honoured her by renaming the Dioecesis Pontica as Pietas, the Latin equivalent of the Greek name Eusebia. Both names refer to piety as well as family loyalty, including the loyalty of a wife to her husband.

Eusebia made a solo visit to Rome in 354, while Constantius was waging war in Germania. She was welcomed, with much ceremony, by the Roman Senate and general populace, and distributed monetary gifts "to the presidents of the tribes and the centurions of the people."

== Patronage of Julian ==
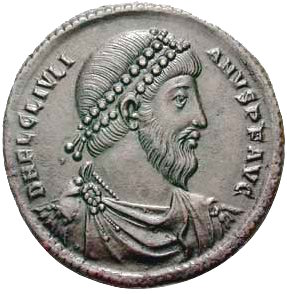
Bronze coin of Julian

After Constantius Gallus was executed in 354, his half-brother Julian was placed under house arrest for 7 months. Julian was subsequently cleared of suspicion despite the efforts of unfriendly courtiers, an outcome attributed to the kindness of Eusebia. Julian thanks her for her intercession, both in the Panegyric and in his "Letter To The Senate And People of Athens", the latter being written after Eusebia's death and Julian's open rupture with Constantius.

By 355, Constantius realized the empire was too big for him to rule by himself. Again defying the opinion of the court officials, Eusebia convinced Constantius to appoint Julian, his last surviving male relative, as Caesar.

Julian himself attributes Eusebia's behavior to kindness and to respect for their familial ties: "no other reason can I discover, nor learn from anyone else, why she became so zealous an ally of mine, and an averter of evil and my preserver, and took such troubles and pain in order that I might retain unaltered and unaffected the Emperor's good will." Modern historians Shaun Tougher and J. Juneau suggest that Eusebia's role may in fact have been part of Constantius's own strategy, using her as a "front woman" in negotiations with Julian, as the two men had a contentious relationship. Eusebia may have been able to help to build a valuable alliance where Constantius needed one.

== Residence in Rome ==
In 357, Constantius celebrated his Vicennalia, the twentieth anniversary of his reign, by moving his court temporarily to Rome, and Eusebia accompanied him in her second recorded visit to the city. "The Cambridge Ancient History" notes that Constantius was following the examples of Diocletian and Constantine I, who also visited Rome during their Vicennalia. The presence of Constantius, Eusebia and Julian's wife Helena marked this as a dynastic display.

Ammianus accused Eusebia of plotting against Helena and causing her miscarriages, which Barnes considered to be an allegation without further reference. While Edward Gibbon did not dismiss it outright, he preferred to suppose that "public malignity imputed the effects of accident as the guilt of Eusebia". The possibility of such a potion's existence was, in his view, something to be determined by physicians rather than historians. "A History of Medicine" (1995), by Plinio Prioreschi, dismisses the account as an example of a common error in early medical thought, "the attribution to drugs of properties that they could not have". A potion which Helena consumed just once ostensibly retained its effect for years, which Prioreschi calls "an obvious impossibility in the light of modern pharmacology".

Tougher follows the example of senior historian Noël Aujoulat in considering the story of Helena's miscarriages being the result of abortifacients to be entirely plausible. Both historians consider Ammianus' allegations, casting Eusebia as the orchestrator of such a plot, should be taken into consideration and "not be lightly dismissed". On the other hand, Crawford observed that there was little to no evidence of such plotting, and Julian did not display any suspicion towards Eusebia, at least outwardly. On speculating Ammianus’ reasoning for the accusation, he suggested that the historian was trying to defend Julian from allegations of divine ill-favor by attributing his wife's miscarriages to human interference.

== Role in religion ==
Eusebia used her considerable influence in court to promote the doctrine of Arianism. Her role as an Arian is noted by Sozomen, who described a resurgence of support for this creed after the death of Constantine. Court partisans of Arianism "found an efficient coadjutor in the presbyter who had obtained from Constantine the recall of Arius… he became an intimate of the emperor's wife, and of the powerful eunuchs of the women's sleeping apartments. At this period Eusebius was appointed to superintend the concerns of the royal household, and being zealously attached to Arianism, he induced the empress and many of the persons belonging to the court to adopt the same sentiments."

Theodoret records that Constantius and Eusebia sent money to the exiled Pope Liberius in 355, although Liberius showed his scorn for the imperial court by refusing the gift. The Suda gives an account of Eusebia's apparent conflict with Leontius, bishop of Tripolis, who held aloof from her at an imperial Synod. She offered to build a church for Leontius if he would meet with her, but received the answer, "[S]o that the respect due to bishops may be preserved, let me come to you, but do you descend at once from your lofty throne and meet me and offer your head to my hands, asking for my blessing.'" The passage goes on to say that Eusebia complained to Constantius, but that the emperor approved of Leontius' stand for the rights of the clergy.

She was credited in Christian legend with translating the relics of St Theodore from Amasea, the site of his martyrdom by immolation, to Euchaita, which became a center of pilgrimage.

== Death ==
Eusebia was already dead by 361, as Constantius II remarried to Faustina during that year. Although Ammianus does not mention how she died, it may have been due to complications from fertility treatments in her desperation to give Constantius an heir. Philostorgius recorded that the Arian bishop and renowned healer Theophilus the Indian was called out of exile to attempt to reverse her infertility.

Crawford speculated that her death could represent the loss of an important connection between Julian and Constantius, as she was noted for her role in protecting Julian after Gallus' death and supporting his promotion to the rank of Caesar.

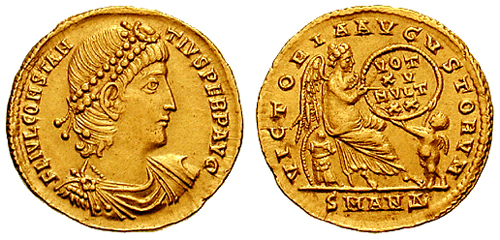
Solidus of Constantius II

== Modern historians ==
Shaun Tougher notes that the panegyric in honor of Eusebia "tends to be neglected" in favor of two orations Julian wrote about Constantius II. Tougher also notes a tendency to take this text "at face value" instead of receiving "deeper analysis". He offers an analysis on how the oration was influenced by first the praise of Arete as found in the Odyssey by Homer, secondly the treatises on speeches of Menander of Laodicea. Menander advised that the praise on an emperor's virtue should focus on four areas: his courage, justice, temperance and wisdom. Julian manages to praise the justice, temperance and wisdom of Eusebia. Notably missing is any reference to her courage. However, there are additional references to her mildness, clemency, philanthropy and liberality.

Tougher notes that Julian reveals her influence on the decisions of Constantius, but constantly reminds his audience that the authority to decide on any given matter rests with the Emperor, not with the Empress. She persuades but does not command. The historian notes how Julian manages to stray from his titular subject and to offer readers a quite detailed portrait of himself, far more detailed than the one on Eusebia. His self-portrayal covers so much of the oration that in Tougher's words "the rhetorician is in danger of eclipsing his subject.

On the matter of portrayal two key elements are the benevolent portrayal of Eusebia and his "satisfaction" at being sent to Athens. Tougher invites the aspiring historian to be cautious on either one. He notes that the oration manages to incorporate both "implied and direct criticism" of the imperial couple. This is only the version of events presented by Julian. A version that might have managed to influence Ammianus Marcellinus and through him later historians. Julian has shaped the historical narrative and portrayal of much of his life. The luck of other perspectives questions its reliability.

"Ammianus Marcellinus and the Representation of Historical Reality" (1998) by Timothy Barnes focuses on the elements shaping Ammianus' account. He notes that "Just as with the male characters in his history ... Ammianus reveals his personal likes and dislikes without inhibition when dealing with the wives of Emprerors". Barnes notes that his portrayal of Eusebia was mostly positive but his motives may be clearly identified. The historian clearly portrays Julian as a hero and his allies are cast in a favorable light by association. Further, Ammianus has only warm praise for Hypatius, pointing to the latter being his friend and a probable patron. Ammianus' settlement in Rome matches the period when Hypatius was its prefect, suggesting that the historian had either arrived in the city with his friend or followed him there at a later date. Eusebia was "protector of Julian" and sister of Hypatius, and as such would require positive treatment.

== Sources ==
- Barnes, Timothy D. (1998). Ammianus Marcellinus and the Representation of Historical Reality (Cornell Studies in Classical Philology). Cornell University Press. ISBN 080143526-9.
- Crawford, Peter (2016). Constantius II: Usurpers, Eunuchs, and the Antichrist. Pen & Sword. ISBN 978-1-78340-055-3.
- Hunt, David (1998). "The successors of Constantine". In Averil Cameron & Peter Garnsey (eds.). The Cambridge Ancient History XIII: The Late Empire, A.D. 337–425. Cambridge University Press. ISBN 0-521-30200-5.
- Martindale, John R.; Jones, A. H. M.; Morris, John, eds. (1971). The Prosopography of the Later Roman Empire: Volume I, AD 260–395. Cambridge: Cambridge University Press. ISBN 0-521-07233-6.
- Juneau, J. (1999). "Piety and Politics: Eusebia and Constantius at Court". The Classical Quarterly. New Series. 49 (2): 641–644. doi:10.1093/cq/49.2.641-a. JSTOR 639898.
- Tougher, Shaun (1998a). "The Advocacy of an Empress: Julian and Eusebia" (PDF). The Classical Quarterly. New Series. 48 (2): 595–599. doi:10.1093/cq/48.2.595. JSTOR 639857.
- Tougher, Shaun (1998b). "In Praise of An Empress: Julian's Speech of Thanks to Eusebia". In Mary Whitby (ed.). The Propaganda of Power: The Role of Panegyric in Late Antiquity. Brill. pp. 105–124. ISBN 978-9-0041-0571-3.

Royal titles
| Preceded by Daughter of Julius Constantius | Roman Empress consort 353–360 with Helena (360) | Succeeded by Faustina |
