= Constans =

Roman emperor from 337 to 350

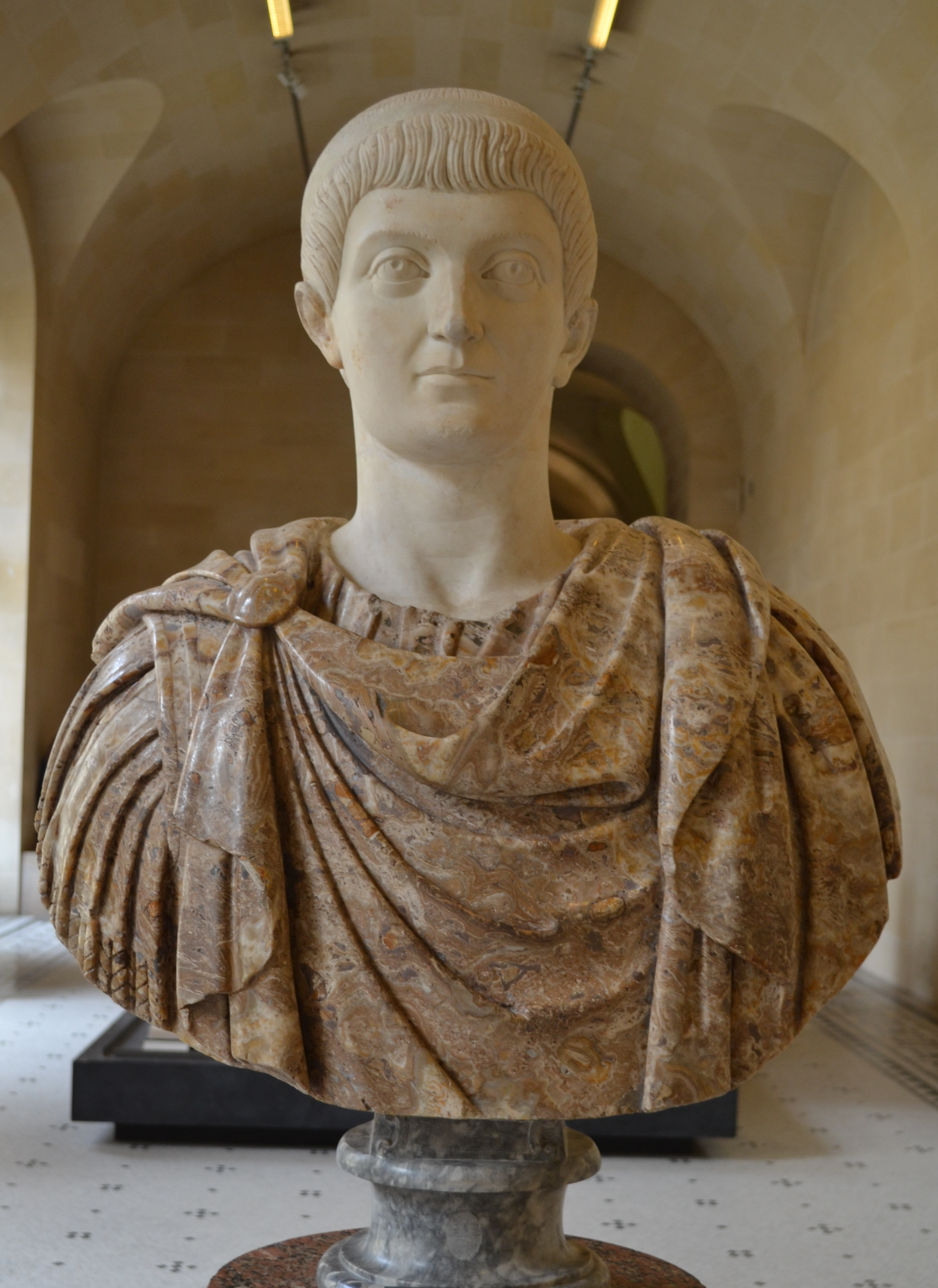
- Possible head of Constans set in a modern bust (Louvre)

Roman emperor
- Augustus: 9 September 337 – January 350
- Predecessor: Constantine I
- Successor: Magnentius
- Co-rulers: Constantine II (Gaul, Hispania and Britain, 337–340); Constantius II (East)
- Caesar: 25 December 333 – 9 September 337
- Born: 322 or 323
- Died: January 350 (aged 27); Vicus Helena, southwestern Gaul
Names
- Flavius Julius Constans
Regnal name
- Imperator Caesar Flavius Julius Constans Augustus
- Dynasty: Constantinian
- Father: Constantine I
- Mother: Fausta
- Religion: Nicene Christianity

Flavius Julius Constans (c. 323 – 350), also called Constans I, was Roman emperor from 337 to 350. He held the imperial rank of caesar from 333, and was the youngest son of Constantine the Great.

After his father's death, he was made augustus alongside his brothers in September 337. Constans was given the administration of the praetorian prefectures of Italy, Illyricum, and Africa. He defeated the Sarmatians in a campaign shortly afterwards. Quarrels over the sharing of power led to a civil war with his eldest brother and co-emperor Constantine II, who invaded Italy in 340 and was killed in battle by Constans's forces near Aquileia. Constans gained from him the praetorian prefecture of Gaul. Thereafter there were tensions with his remaining brother and co-augustus Constantius II (r. 337–361), including over the exiled bishop Athanasius of Alexandria, who in turn eulogized Constans as "the most pious Augustus... of blessed and everlasting memory." In the following years he campaigned against the Franks, and in 343 he visited Roman Britain, the last legitimate emperor to do so until Manuel II in 1400, more than a thousand years later.

In January 350, Magnentius (r. 350–353) the commander of the Jovians and Herculians, a corps in the Roman army, was acclaimed augustus at Augustodunum (Autun) with the support of Marcellinus, the comes rei privatae. Magnentius overthrew and killed Constans. Surviving sources, possibly influenced by the propaganda of Magnentius's faction, accuse Constans of misrule and of homosexuality.

== Early life ==
Sources variously report Constans' age at the time of his death as 27 or 30, meaning he was born in either 320 or 323. Timothy Barnes, observing numismatic evidence, considered the younger age to be more likely. He was the third and youngest son of Constantine I and Fausta. According to the works of both Ausonius and Libanius, he was educated at Constantinople under the tutelage of the poet Aemilius Magnus Arborius, who instructed him in Latin.

On 25 December 333, Constans was elevated to the imperial rank of caesar at Constantinople by his father. Prior to 337, Constans became engaged to Olympias, the daughter of the praetorian prefect Ablabius, although the marriage did not actually happen. Shaun Tougher commented that it was odd for Constans to have never married, regardless of whether or not the allegations surrounding his sexuality were true.

== Reign ==
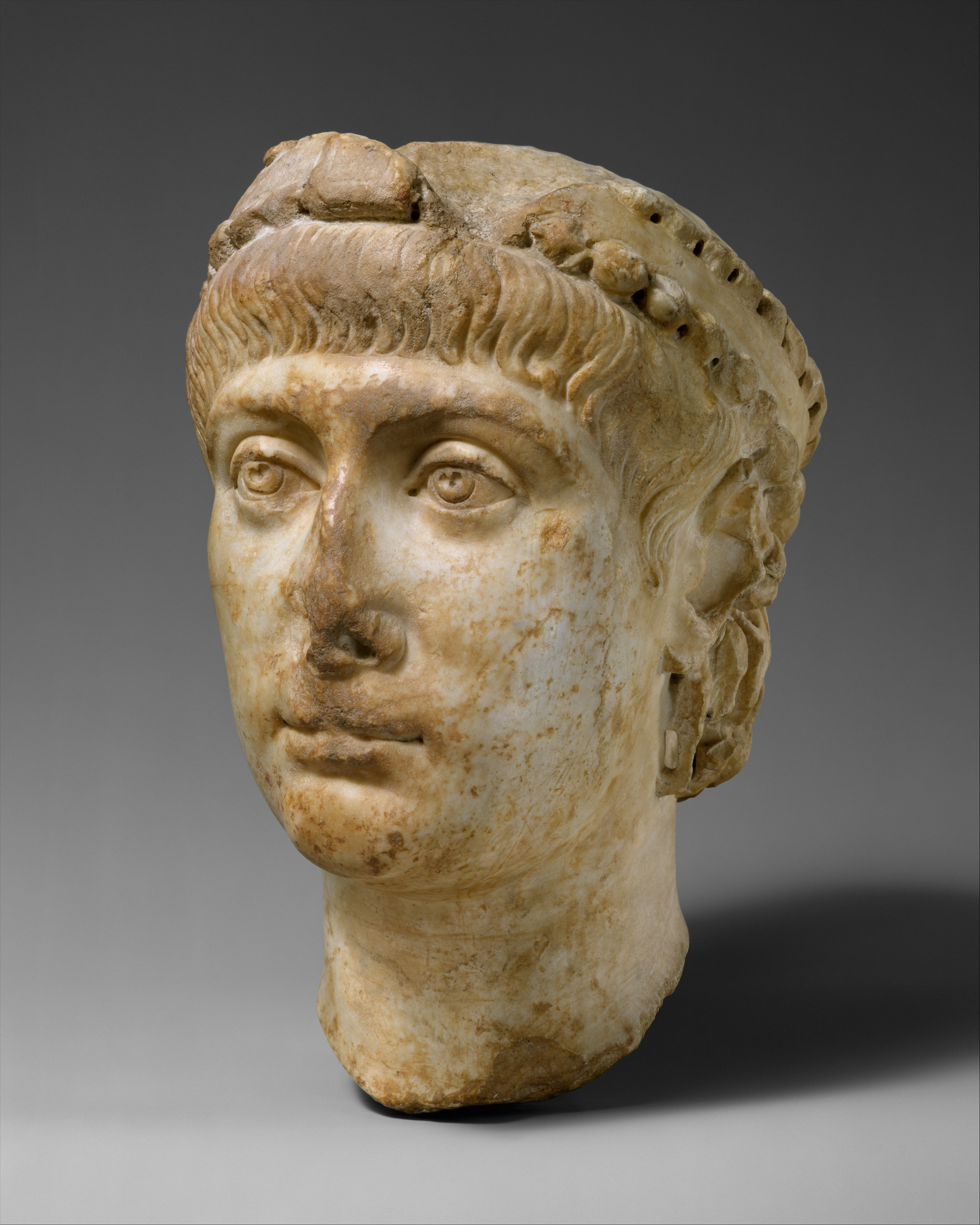
Head of a 4th-century child emperor, most likely Constans.

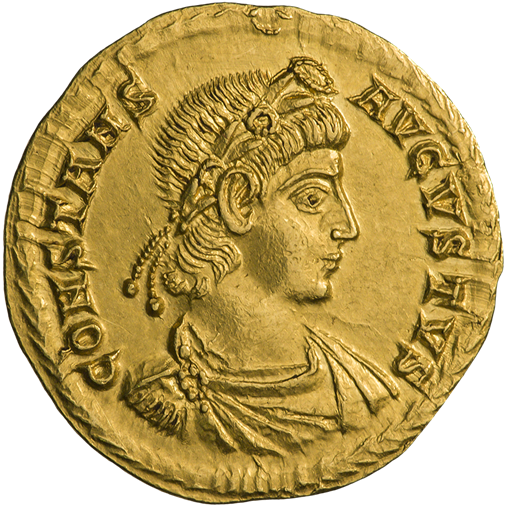
Solidus of Constans marked: constans augustus.

After Constantine's death, Constans and his two brothers, Constantine II and Constantius II were proclaimed augusti and divided the Roman empire among themselves on 9 September 337. Constans was left with Italy, Africa and Illyricum. In 338, he campaigned against the Sarmatians.

Meanwhile, Constans came into conflict with his eldest brother Constantine II over the latter's presumed authority over Constans' territory. After attempting to issue legislation to Africa in 339, which was part of Constans' realm, Constantine led his army into an invasion of Italy only a year later. However, he was ambushed and killed by Constans' troops, and Constans then took control of his brother's territories.

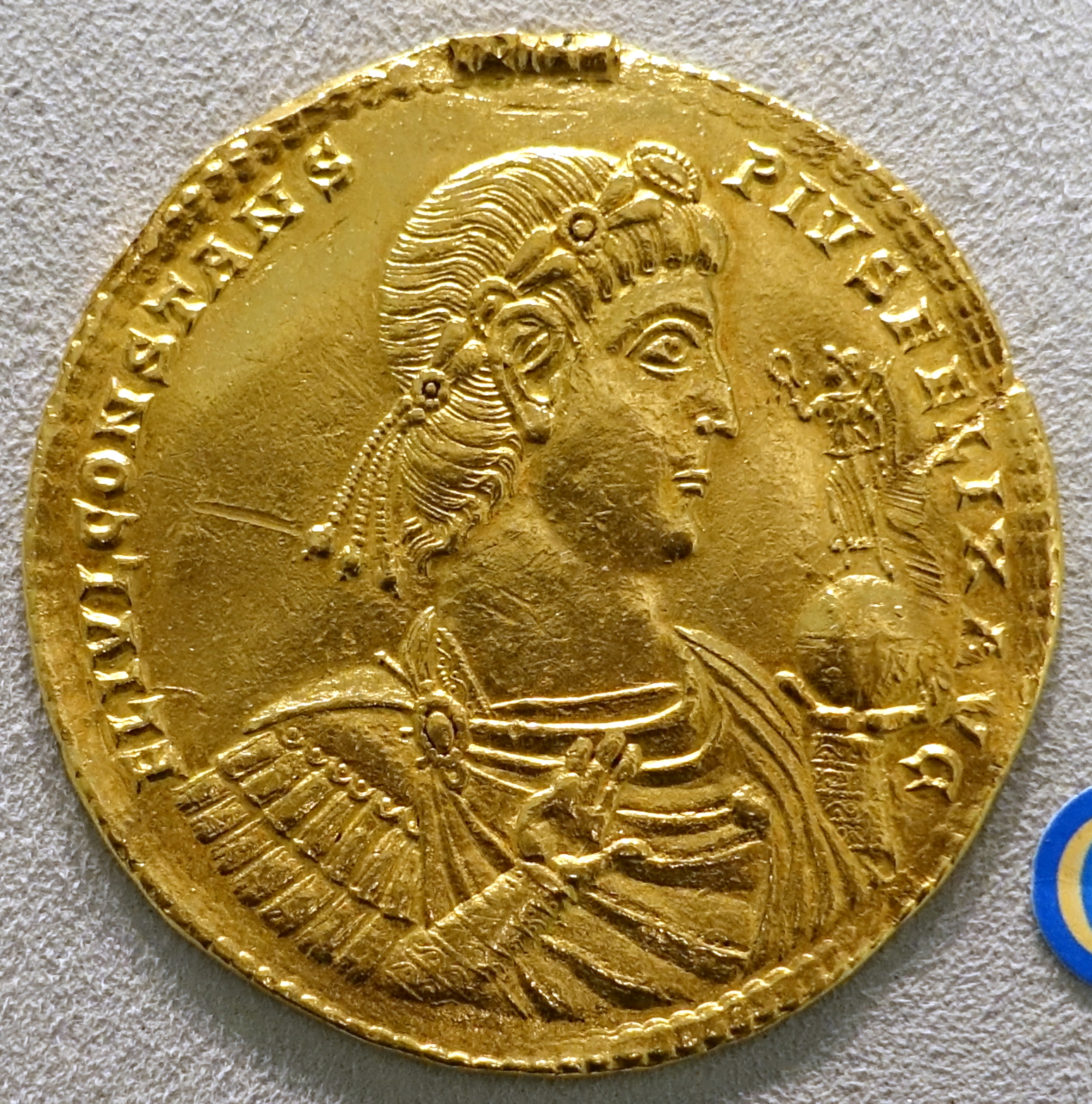
Gold medallion of Constans, equivalent to 9 solidi. Aquileia, 342 AD – Bode Museum

Constans began his reign in an energetic fashion. From 341 to 342, he led a campaign against the Franks where, after an initial setback, the military operation concluded with a victory and a favorable peace treaty. Eutropius wrote that he "had performed many gallant actions in the field, and had made himself feared by the army through the whole course of his life, though without exercising any extraordinary severity," while Ammianus Marcellinus remarked that Julian was the only person the Alamanni feared after the death of Constans.

In the early months of 343, he visited Britain, an event celebrated enough for Libanius to dedicate several sections of his panegyric to explaining it. Although the reasons for the visit remain unclear, the ancient writers were primarily interested in Constans' precarious journey to the province, rather than his actions within it. One theory considers it to have involved the northern frontier, based on Ammianus' remark that he had discussed the Areani in his now-lost coverage of Constans' reign. Additionally, after recording attacks "near the frontiers" in 360, the historian wrote that the Alamanni were too much of a threat for Julian to confront the problem, in contrast to what Constans was able to do.

Constans was accused of employing corrupt ministers during his reign, due to his purported personal greed. One example included the magister officiorum (master of the offices) Flavius Eugenius, who remained in his position throughout most of the 340s. Despite Eugenius being alleged to have misused his power to seize property, the emperor continued to support him, his trust going as far as to honor him with a statue in the Forum of Trajan in Rome.

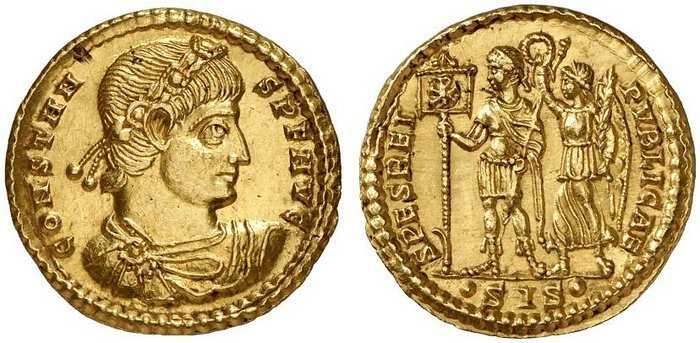
Solidus of Constans marked: constans p·f· augustus on the obverse, with the emperor holding a vexillum with a chi-rho and crowned by Victory on the reverse, marked: spes rei publicae ("the hope of the Republic")

=== Religion ===
Constans issued an edict banning superstition and pagan sacrifices in 341, his justification being that he was following the precedent set by his father. Only a short while later though, he tried to moderate his stance by legislating against the destruction of temple buildings.

Constans' support of Nicene orthodoxy and the bishop Athanasius of Alexandria brought him into conflict with his brother Constantius. Although the two emperors called the Council of Serdica in 343 to settle the conflict, it was a complete failure, and by 345 Constans was outright threatening civil war against his brother. Eventually, Constantius agreed to allow Athanasius to return to his position, as the bishop's replacement had recently died. Constans also used the military to suppress Donatism in Africa, where the church was split between Donatists and Catholics.

=== Alleged homosexuality ===
Constans was targeted with gossip over his personal life. Numerous ancient writers suspected him of homosexuality, perhaps because he never married. Aurelius Victor charged the emperor with "rabid" pederasty towards young barbarian hostages, and asserted it was a contributing factor to his unpopularity. Modern scholars have generally doubted the veracity of these claims, with some of them pointing to Constans' legislation against homosexuality in 342.

== Death ==
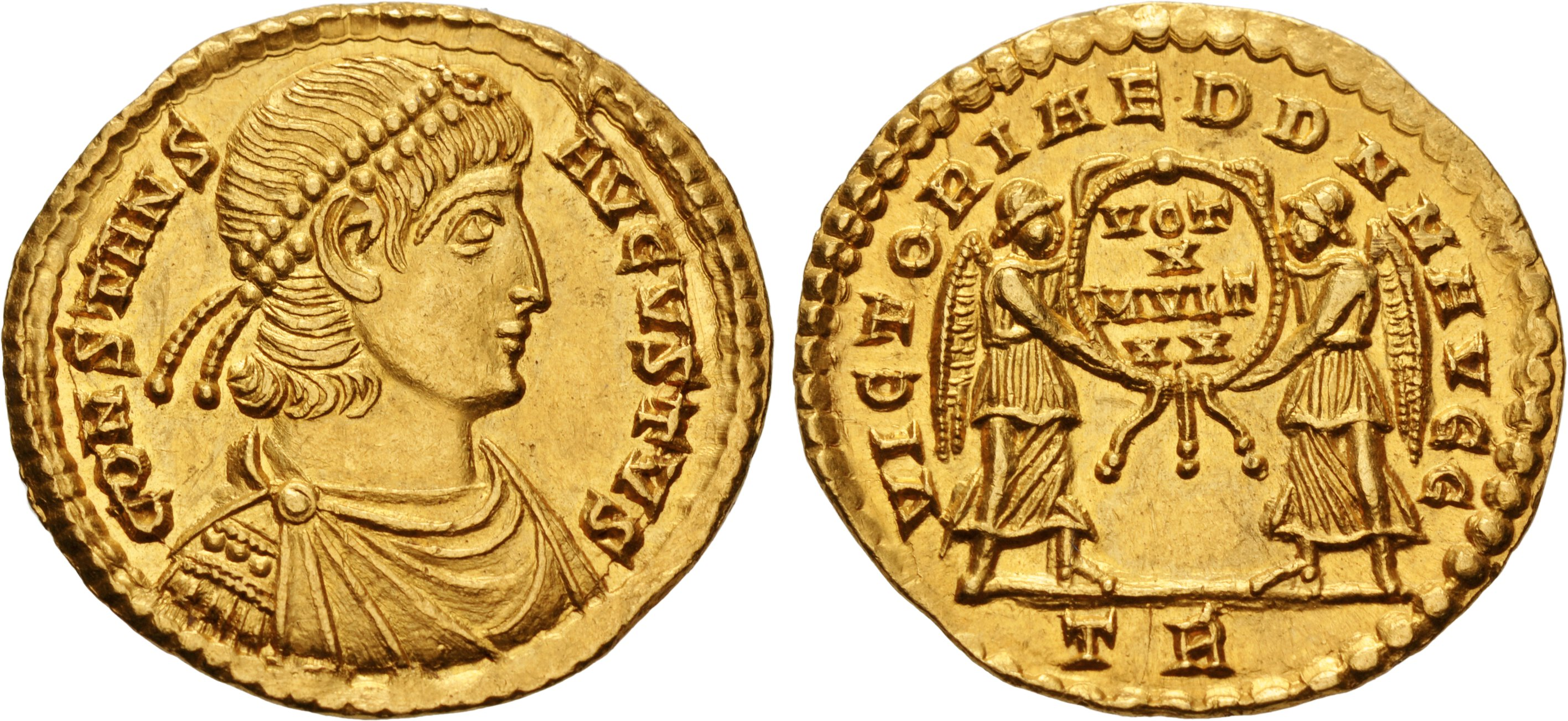
Solidus of Constans, Decennalia issue of 347/348

On 18 January 350, the general Magnentius declared himself emperor at Augustodunum (Autun) with the support of a number of court officials such as Marcellinus, Constans' comes rerum privatarum, as well as Fabius Titianus, who had previously served as the praetorian prefect of Gaul. At the time, Constans was distracted by a hunting trip. As he was trying to reach Hispania, supporters of Magnentius cornered him in a fortification in Helena (Elne) in the eastern Pyrenees of southwestern Gaul, where he was killed after seeking sanctuary in a temple. (Note: While it has sometimes been assumed that Constans had to flee for his life, Harries has disputed this, believing that the location of Constans' death indicates he was unaware of the revolt.) An alleged prophecy at his birth had said Constans would die "in the arms of his grandmother". His place of death happens to have been named after Helena, mother of Constantine and his own grandmother, thus realizing the prophecy. Constans' name would later be erased from inscriptions in places that recognized Magnentius as emperor.

Ancient sources agree that Constans was overthrown due to his own failings, which caused him to become widely unpopular. Along with the accusation of corruption and homosexuality, he is also accused of neglecting portions of the empire and treating his soldiers with contempt. Ammianus lamented the emperor's failure to listen to wise counsel, referencing one man he believed could have saved Constans from his own faults.

However, some modern scholars have questioned this portrayal. According to historian Jill Harries, "The detail that Constans was in the habit of making journeys with only a small escort may account for his vulnerability in 350." Based on several factors - the small number of people behind the plot, how the setting for Magnentius' coup was not a military centre, Vetranio's proclamation as emperor in opposition to Magnentius, and Julian's report that the usurper had to murder several of Constans' generals to take control of the Gallic army – she concluded that Magnentius' revolt was "the result of a private grudge on the part of an apprehensive official and not the outcome of widespread discontent among the military or the wider population." This view is supported by Peter Crawford, who considered the explanation from the ancient sources to be a misconception caused by the rapid success of the coup.

Nonetheless, Harries does acknowledge a few factors that indicate Constans faced significant opposition from the military. The Gallic army accepted Magnentius seemingly without difficulty, and according to Zosimus, Constantius' official Philippus emphasized Constantine, rather than Constans, when addressing Magnentius' troops. On speculating the basis for Constans' downfall, she suggested that one reason may have been regarding financial difficulties in Gaul by the end of his reign, which could have been related to the finance officer Marcellinus' support of him. After Magnentius took power, he levied taxes, sold imperial estates in Gaul and debased the coinage. Nicholas Baker-Brian also observed how Magnentius sent his brother Decentius to defend the region after Constans had neglected it, writing that, "it is apparent that among the reasons for Magnentius' rebellion was a desire to remedy Constans' governmental failings in Gaul."

== Family tree ==
CONSTANTINIAN DYNASTY detailed family tree

Afranius Hannibalianus | Eutropia | Maximian; Western emperor
Theodora | Constantius I Chlorus; Western emperor 250-305-306 | Helena; 250–330 | Maxentius; Western emperor
Constantia; 293–330 ∞ Licinius; 250-308-324-325 | Flavius Dalmatius censor | 1.Galla | Julius Constantius d. 337 ∞ 2.Basilina | Anastasia | Eutropia | Fausta; 289–326 | Constantine I the Great; 272-306-337 | Minervina
Dalmatius caesar | Hannibalianus | (1) Constantius Gallus | (2) Julian; 331-360-363 | Helena d. 360 | Constantina ∞ 1.Hannibalianus; 2.Constantius Gallus | Constantius II; 317-337-361 ∞ Faustina | Constantine II; Western emperor 316-337-340 | Constans I Western emperor 320-337-350 | (daughter) ∞ Justus | Crispus d. 326
Jovian; 331-363-364 | Marina Severa | Valentinian I Western emperor VALENTINIANIC DYNASTY | Justina
Constantia; 361–383 | Gratian; Western emperor 359-367-383 | Galla | Theodosius I Eastern emperor THEODOSIAN DYNASTY

Family of Constans

Emperors are shown with a rounded-corner border with their dates as Augusti, names with a thicker border appear in both sections

1: Constantine's parents and half-siblings

Claudius Gothicus; 268–270; fabricated ancestry
Helena | Constantius Chlorus; 305–306 | Flavia Maximiana Theodora
Constantine I; 306–337 | Flavius Dalmatius | Hannibalianus | Flavia Julia Constantia | Licinius; 308–324 | Anastasia | Bassianus
Galla | Julius Constantius | Basilina | Licinius II | Eutropia | Virius Nepotianus
Hannibalianus | Constantina | Constantius Gallus | Julian; 360–363 | Helena | Nepotianus

2: Constantine's children

Minervina | Constantine I; 306–337 | Fausta
Crispus | Constantine II; 337–340 | Constans; 337–350 | Hannibalianus | Constantina | Constantius Gallus
Faustina | Constantius II; 337–361 | Helena | Julian; 360–363
Gratian; 367–383 | Constantia

== See also ==
- Itineraries of the Roman emperors, 337–361

== Notes ==
Regnal titles
| Preceded by Constantine I | Roman emperor 337–350; With: Constantius II and Constantine II | Succeeded by Magnentius; Vetranio |
Political offices
| Preceded by Ursus; Polemius | Roman consul 339; With: Constantius Augustus II | Succeeded by Septimius Acindynus; L. Aradius Valerius Proculus |
| Preceded by Antonius Marcellinus; Petronius Probinus | Roman consul II; 342; With: Constantius Augustus III | Succeeded by M. Furius Placidus; Romulus |
| Preceded by Amantius; M. Nummius Albinus | Roman consul III; 346; With: Constantius Augustus IV | Succeeded by Vulcacius Rufinus; Eusebius |
