= Constantius Gallus =

Roman caesar from 351 to 354

- Caesar (15 March 351 – 354)
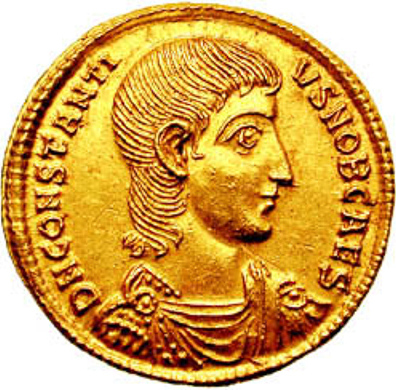
- Solidus of Constantius Gallus, marked: d·n· constanti-us nob·caes·
- Born: Gallus; 325 or 326; Massa Veternensis, Etruria
- Died: 354 (aged 28); Pola
- Spouse: Constantina
- Issue: Anastasia (only daughter)
Regnal name
- Flavius Claudius Constantius Nobilissimus Caesar
- Dynasty: Constantinian
- Father: Julius Constantius
- Mother: Galla
- Religion: Christianity

Flavius Claudius Constantius Gallus (326 – 354) was a statesman and ruler in the eastern provinces of the Roman Empire from 351 to 354, as Caesar under emperor Constantius II (r. 337–61), his cousin. A grandson of emperor Constantius Chlorus (r. 293–306) and empress Flavia Maximiana Theodora, and a son of Julius Constantius and Galla, he belonged to the Constantinian dynasty.

Born during the reign of his uncle Constantine the Great (r. 306–37), he was among the few male members of the imperial family to survive the purge that followed Constantine's death. Under Constantius II, Gallus served as deputy emperor, based in Antioch and married to Constantius' sister Constantina. He dealt with a Jewish revolt in the years 351-352. Gallus ultimately fell out of favor with Constantius and was executed, being replaced as Caesar by his younger half-brother Julian.

== Family ==
Gallus was a son of Julius Constantius and his first wife Galla, who seems to have died at some point prior to 331/2. Gallus' paternal grandparents were the emperor Constantius Chlorus and his second wife Flavia Maximiana Theodora. Julius Constantius was a paternal half-brother of the emperor Constantine I, which, in turn, meant Gallus was a half-first cousin of Constantine's sons, Constantine II, Constantius II and Constans.

Gallus had three siblings: his elder sister, of unknown name, was the first wife of Constantius II, and his elder brother, also of unknown name, died in the purges after the death of Constantine I. His younger half-brother, by his father's second marriage to Basilina, was Flavius Claudius Iulianus, commonly known as Julian.

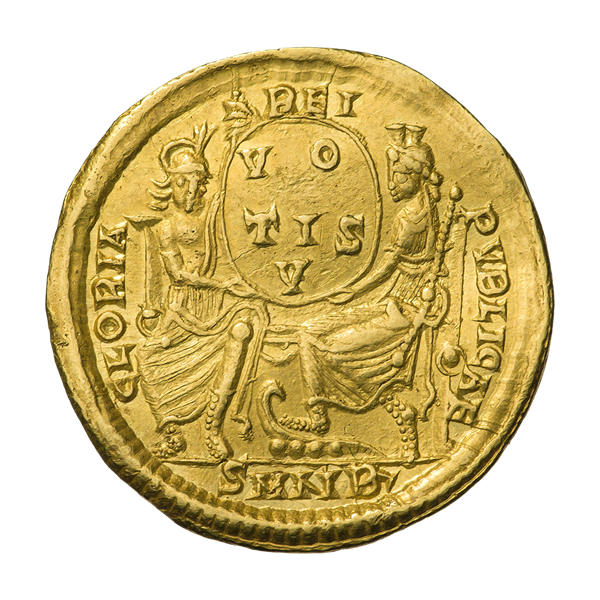
Reverse of a solidus of Constantius Gallus showing the Tyche of Constantinople (R) and the Tyche of Rome (L) with the legend: gloria reipublicae ("the Glory of the Republic")

== Youth ==
Gallus was born in Massa Veternensis, Italia, after his father had been recalled from exile. Gallus' father and his elder brother were amongst those killed during the purges that occurred in the imperial family after the death of Constantine I in 337. Gallus himself was one of the only imperial males – besides the three sons of Constantine I and Fausta – who were not killed; the others being Gallus' younger half-brother, Julian, and their cousin, Nepotianus, all of whom were very young at the time.

Gallus was said by Ammianus Marcellinus to have been very good looking, making particular note of his soft blond hair.

There is debate over where Gallus spent his youth. One view is that he lived with Julian in Nicomedia under the care of bishop Eusebius of Nicomedia until 340. At that point, Eusebius was made bishop of Constantinople, which necessitated Gallus and Julian following him there. It is believed that, after the death of Eusebius in 341, Constantius then sent Gallus and Julian to continue their studies at the imperial household in Macellum, Cappadocia. An alternative view claims that hints in the sources suggest that Gallus was sent to Ephesus to study, then to a type of exile in Tralles and from there to the imperial household in Macellum.

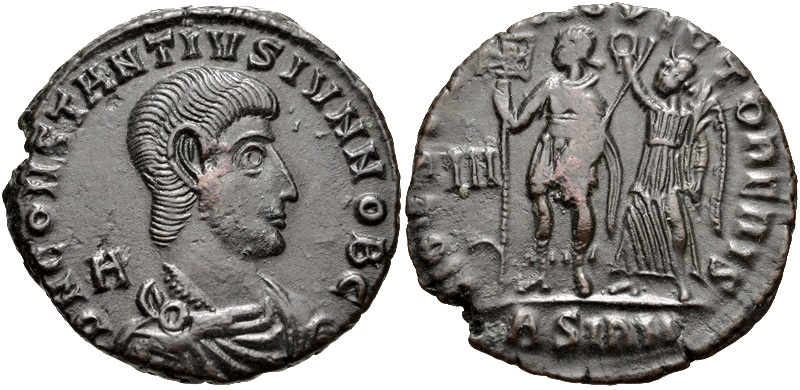
Follis of Constantius Gallus, showing the emperor crowned by Victory and holding a vexillum with a chi-rho, inscribed: hoc signo victor eris ("by his sign shall you be victor")

== Caesar ==
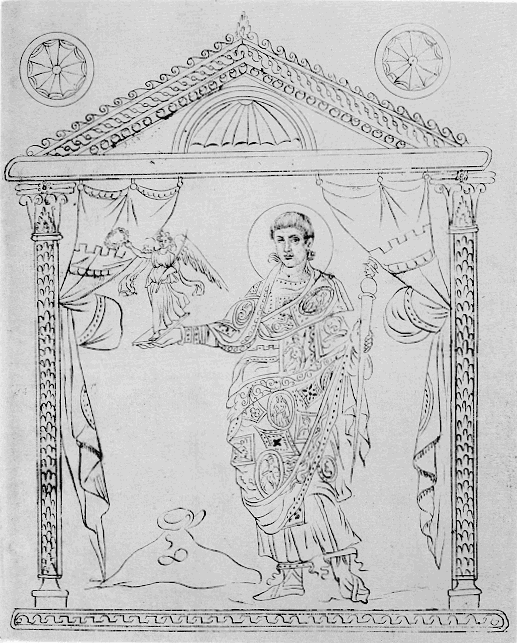
Constantius Gallus in a later copy of the Chronograph of 354

Location of Antioch in present-day Turkey

In 350, Magnentius rebelled and killed the emperor Constans, claiming the purple. Constantius II prepared to move against the usurper, but needed a representative in the East, so he called Gallus at Sirmium, raised him to the rank of caesar (15 March 351), gave him the name Constantius, and strengthened the bonds with his cousin by allowing Gallus to marry his sister Constantina. The two set up residence in Antioch.

During his rule, Gallus had to deal with a Jewish rebellion in the Palaestina (see Jewish revolt against Gallus) led by Patricius and Isaac of Diocesarea. The rebellion, possibly started before Gallus' elevation to Caesar, was crushed by Gallus' general, Ursicinus, who ordered all the rebels slain.

Gallus was saved from an assassination plot by a woman, who revealed that some members of her household were planning the murder. Some sources, among whom are Joannes Zonaras, claim that this plot had been organized by Magnentius in order to distract Constantius.

Philostorgius claims that Gallus' generals won a campaign against the Sassanids. Other sources, basing their views on an almost-peaceful situation between the Sassanids and Romans while Shapur II was engaged in a campaign against the Huns in the east, dismiss this claim. Ammianus relays an abortive scheme of Nohodares, Shapur's lieutenant in Mesopotamia, to surprise the town of Batnae, which was betrayed by some in his own army, in 353. In the same year, Gallus sent the comes Orientis, Nebridius, against the Isaurians, who had been raiding the coastal provinces, and were now besieging Seleucia on the Calycadnus. They dispersed on his approach.

As a consequence of the need to gather food for the troops for a Persian campaign or because of drought, the grain supply in Antioch decreased. In order to counter the higher price of grain, Gallus forced the passage of some laws regardless of the opinion of the Senate, thus alienating the senatorial class of Antioch. Ammianus Marcellinus, a pro-senatorial writer, tells how the anger of the people of Antioch for the famine was diverted by Gallus towards the consularis Syriae Theophilus, who was killed by the mob.

Ammianus reports also that Gallus and Constantina brought a number of wealthy people to trial for magic, ending in the execution of innocents and in the confiscation of their wealth. The same source claims that Gallus walked anonymously in Antioch by night, asking passers-by for their opinion on their caesar, while Julian records the great amount of time spent by Gallus at the Hippodrome, probably to obtain popular support.

Doubting his cousin's loyalty, Constantius reduced the troops under Gallus, and sent the Praetorian Prefect Domitianus to Antioch to urge Gallus to go to Italy. Different sources tell different stories, but all agree that Gallus arrested Domitianus and the quaestor Montius Magnus who had come to his aid, and that the two officers were killed.

The arrest of Montius Magnus led to the discovery of what seems to be a plot to usurp Gallus' position. The conspirators had the support of two tribuni fabricarum (officers of the weapons factories) who had promised the weapons for an uprising (Ammianus Marcellinus, 14.7.18), and probably of the troops in Mesopotamia, as well as of the rector of the province of Phoenice. All suspected in connection with the plot, including many innocents, were put to death by order of the Caesar.

== Fall and death ==
Constantius was informed of the treason trials in Antioch during a campaign against the Alamanni. After concluding a peace treaty with the Germanic tribe, Constantius decided to settle the matter with his cousin. First he summoned Ursicinus to the West, whom he suspected of inciting Gallus in order to create the occasion for a revolt and the usurpation of his own son.

Next, Constantius summoned Gallus and Constantina to Mediolanum. Constantina left first, in order to gain some of her brother's trust, but suddenly died from a fever at Caeni Gallicani in Bithynia. Gallus, whose bonds to Constantius had been weakened, stayed in Antioch. Constantius tried to lure Gallus, sending the tribunus scutariorum Scudilo to tell Gallus that Constantius wanted to raise him to Augustus. Gallus took Constantius's bait and left Antioch to meet him. Gallus staged a chariot race in Constantinople's Hippodrome and crowned the victor, an honor reserved only for an Augustus. This insolence enraged Constantius. In an attempt to further isolate Gallus from any form of military protection, Constantius had the garrisons removed from the towns in Gallus's path.

When Gallus arrived at Poetovio in Noricum, Barbatio, an officer who had been supporting Gallus' dismissal within Constantius' court, surrounded the palace of the Caesar and arrested him, stripping Gallus of the imperial robes, but assuring him that no harm would come to him. Gallus was led to Pola, Istria (now Pula, Croatia). Here he was interrogated by some of the highest officials of Constantius' court, including the eunuch praepositus sacri cubiculi Eusebius and the agens in rebus Apodemius. Gallus tried to put the blame for all of his actions on Constantina, but Constantius sentenced him to death; the emperor later changed his mind, and ordered Gallus spared, but Eusebius prevented the order from reaching the executioners.

== Family tree ==
CONSTANTINIAN DYNASTY detailed family tree

Afranius Hannibalianus | Eutropia | Maximian; Western emperor
Theodora | Constantius I Chlorus; Western emperor 250-305-306 | Helena; 250–330 | Maxentius; Western emperor
Constantia; 293–330 ∞ Licinius; 250-308-324-325 | Flavius Dalmatius censor | 1.Galla | Julius Constantius d. 337 ∞ 2.Basilina | Anastasia | Eutropia | Fausta; 289–326 | Constantine I the Great; 272-306-337 | Minervina
Dalmatius caesar | Hannibalianus | (1) Constantius Gallus | (2) Julian; 331-360-363 | Helena d. 360 | Constantina ∞ 1.Hannibalianus; 2.Constantius Gallus | Constantius II; 317-337-361 ∞ Faustina | Constantine II; Western emperor 316-337-340 | Constans I Western emperor 320-337-350 | (daughter) ∞ Justus | Crispus d. 326
Jovian; 331-363-364 | Marina Severa | Valentinian I Western emperor VALENTINIANIC DYNASTY | Justina
Constantia; 361–383 | Gratian; Western emperor 359-367-383 | Galla | Theodosius I Eastern emperor THEODOSIAN DYNASTY

Family of Constantius Gallus

Emperors are shown with a rounded-corner border with their dates as Augusti, names with a thicker border appear in both sections

1: Constantine's parents and half-siblings

Claudius Gothicus; 268–270; fabricated ancestry
Helena | Constantius I; 305–306 | Flavia Maximiana Theodora
Constantine I; 306–337 | Flavius Dalmatius | Hannibalianus | Flavia Julia Constantia | Licinius; 308–324 | Anastasia | Bassianus
Galla | Julius Constantius | Basilina | Licinius II | Eutropia | Virius Nepotianus
Hannibalianus | Constantina | Constantius Gallus | Julian; 360–363 | Helena | Nepotianus

2: Constantine's children

Minervina | Constantine I; 306–337 | Fausta
Crispus | Constantine II; 337–340 | Constans; 337–350 | Hannibalianus | Constantina | Constantius Gallus
Faustina | Constantius II; 337–361 | Helena | Julian; 360–363
Gratian; 367–383 | Constantia

== See also ==
- Itineraries of the Roman emperors, 337–361
- Jewish revolt against Gallus

== Sources ==
- Banchich, Thomas M., "Gallus Caesar (15 March 351 – 354 A.D.)", DIR (1997) (Archive)
- Crawford, Peter (2016). Constantius II: Usurpers, Eunuchs, and the Antichrist. Pen & Sword. ISBN 978-1-78340-055-3.
- Hunt, David (1998). "The successors of Constantine". In Averil Cameron & Peter Garnsey (eds.). The Cambridge Ancient History XIII: The Late Empire, A.D. 337–425. Cambridge University Press. ISBN 0-521-30200-5.
- Jones, A.H.M.; J.R. Martindale & J. Morris (1971). The Prosopography of the Later Roman Empire Volume 1: A.D. 260–395. Cambridge University Press. p. 224. ISBN 0-521-07233-6.
- Seeck, Otto, "Constantius 5", Realencyclopädie der classischen Altertumswissenschaft, volume 7 (IV.1), Metzlerscher Verlag (Stuttgart, 1900), columns 1094–1099.

| Preceded by Magnus Magnentius Augustus, Gaiso; Post consulatum Sergii et Nigriniani (East) | Roman consul 352 with Magnus Decentius Caesar; Paulus; Fl. Iulius Constantius Augustus V | Succeeded by Magnus Magnentius Augustus II, Magnus Decentius Caesar II, Fl. Iulius Constantius Augustus VI, Fl. Claudius Constantius Caesar II |
| Preceded by Magnus Decentius Caesar, Paulus, Fl. Iulius Constantius Augustus V, Fl. Claudius Constantius Caesar | Roman consul 353 with Magnus Magnentius Augustus II; Magnus Decentius Caesar II; Fl. Iulius Constantius Augustus VI | Succeeded by Fl. Iulius Constantius Augustus VII, Flavius Claudius Constantius Caesar III |
| Preceded by Magnus Magnentius Augustus II, Magnus Decentius Caesar II, Fl. Iulius Constantius Augustus VI, Fl. Claudius Constantius Caesar II | Roman consul 354 with Fl. Iulius Constantius Augustus VII | Succeeded by Fl. Arbitio, Q. Fl. Maesius Egnatius Lollianus |
