= Constantius II =

Roman emperor from 337 to 361

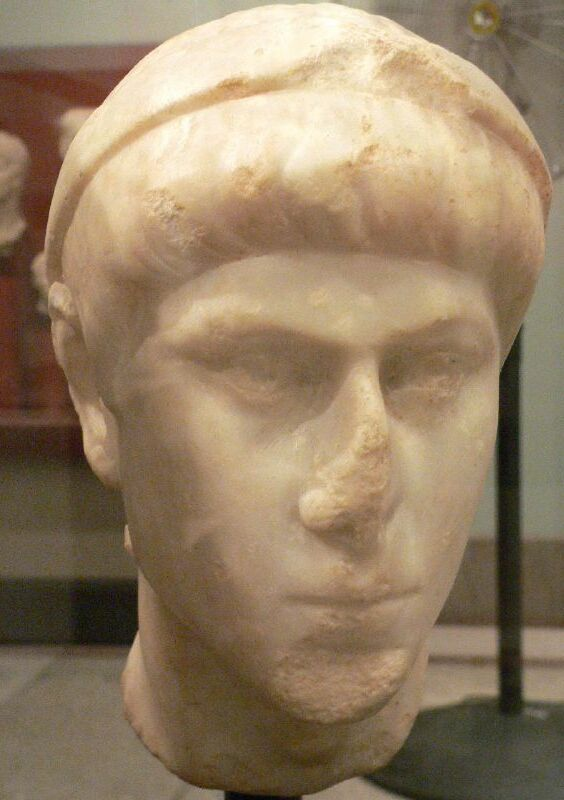
- Possible head portrait of Constantius II found in modern al-Bab, Syria (Penn Museum)

Roman emperor
- Augustus: 9 September 337 – 3 November 361
- Predecessor: Constantine I
- Successor: Julian
- Co-rulers: See list: Constantine II (337–340) (Note: In the Praetorian prefecture of Gaul.); Constans I (337–350) (Note: In the Praetorian prefecture of Italy, then the whole Western Roman Empire.); Magnentius (350–353) (Note: In the West, unrecognized by Constantius II.); Vetranio (350) (Note: In the West, against Magnentius.); Nepotianus (350) (Note: In Rome for 27 days, against Magnentius.); Julian (360–361) (Note: In rebellion against Constantius II.)
- Caesar: 8 November 324 – 9 September 337
- Born: 7 August 317; Sirmium, Pannonia Inferior, Roman Empire
- Died: 3 November 361 (aged 44); Mopsuestia, Cilicia, Roman Empire
- Burial: Church of the Holy Apostles
- Spouse: Daughter of Julius Constantius; Eusebia; Faustina
- Issue: Constantia (wife of Gratian)
Names
- Flavius Julius Constantius
Regnal name
- Imperator Caesar Flavius Julius Constantius Augustus
- Dynasty: Constantinian
- Father: Constantine the Great
- Mother: Fausta
- Religion: Semi-Arianism

Constantius II (Latin: Flavius Julius Constantius; Ancient Greek: Κωνστάντιος, romanized: Kōnstántios; 7 August 317 – 3 November 361) was Roman emperor from 337 to 361. His reign saw constant warfare on the borders against the Sasanian Empire and Germanic peoples, while internally the Roman Empire went through repeated civil wars, court intrigues, and usurpations. His religious policies inflamed domestic conflicts that would continue after his death.

Constantius was a son of Constantine the Great, who elevated him to the imperial rank of Caesar on 8 November 324 and after whose death Constantius became Augustus together with his brothers, Constantine II and Constans on 9 September 337. He promptly oversaw the massacre of his father-in-law, an uncle, and several cousins, consolidating his hold on power. The brothers divided the empire among themselves, with Constantius receiving Greece, Thrace, the Asian provinces, and Egypt in the east. For the following decade a costly and inconclusive war against Persia took most of Constantius's time and attention. In the meantime, his brothers Constantine and Constans warred over the western provinces of the empire, leaving the former dead in 340 and the latter as sole ruler of the west. The two remaining brothers maintained an uneasy peace with each other until, in 350, Constans was overthrown and assassinated by the usurper Magnentius.

Unwilling to accept Magnentius as co-ruler, Constantius waged a civil war against the usurper, defeating him at the battles of Mursa Major in 351 and Mons Seleucus in 353. Magnentius died by suicide after the latter battle, leaving Constantius as sole ruler of the empire. In 351, Constantius elevated his cousin Constantius Gallus to the subordinate rank of Caesar to rule in the east, but had him executed three years later after receiving scathing reports of his violent and corrupt nature. Shortly thereafter, in 355, Constantius promoted his last surviving cousin, Gallus's younger half-brother Julian, to the rank of Caesar.

As emperor, Constantius promoted Arianism, banned pagan sacrifices, and issued laws against Jews. His military campaigns against Germanic and Iranian tribes were successful: he defeated the Alamanni in 354 and campaigned across the Danube against the Quadi and Sarmatians in 357. The war against the Sasanians, which had been in a lull since 350, erupted with renewed intensity in 359 and Constantius travelled to the east in 360 to restore stability after the loss of several border fortresses. However, Julian claimed the rank of Augustus in 360, leading to war between the two after Constantius's attempts to persuade Julian to back down failed. No battle was fought, as Constantius became ill and died of fever on 3 November 361 in Mopsuestia, allegedly naming Julian as his rightful successor before his death.

== Early life ==
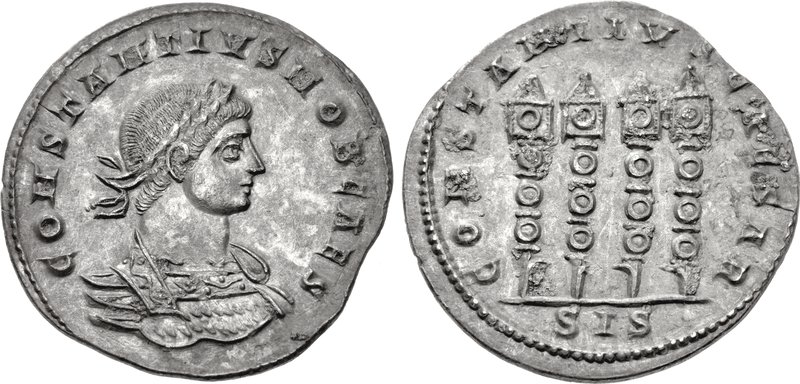
Caesar Constantius II on a miliarense of Siscia, AD 327

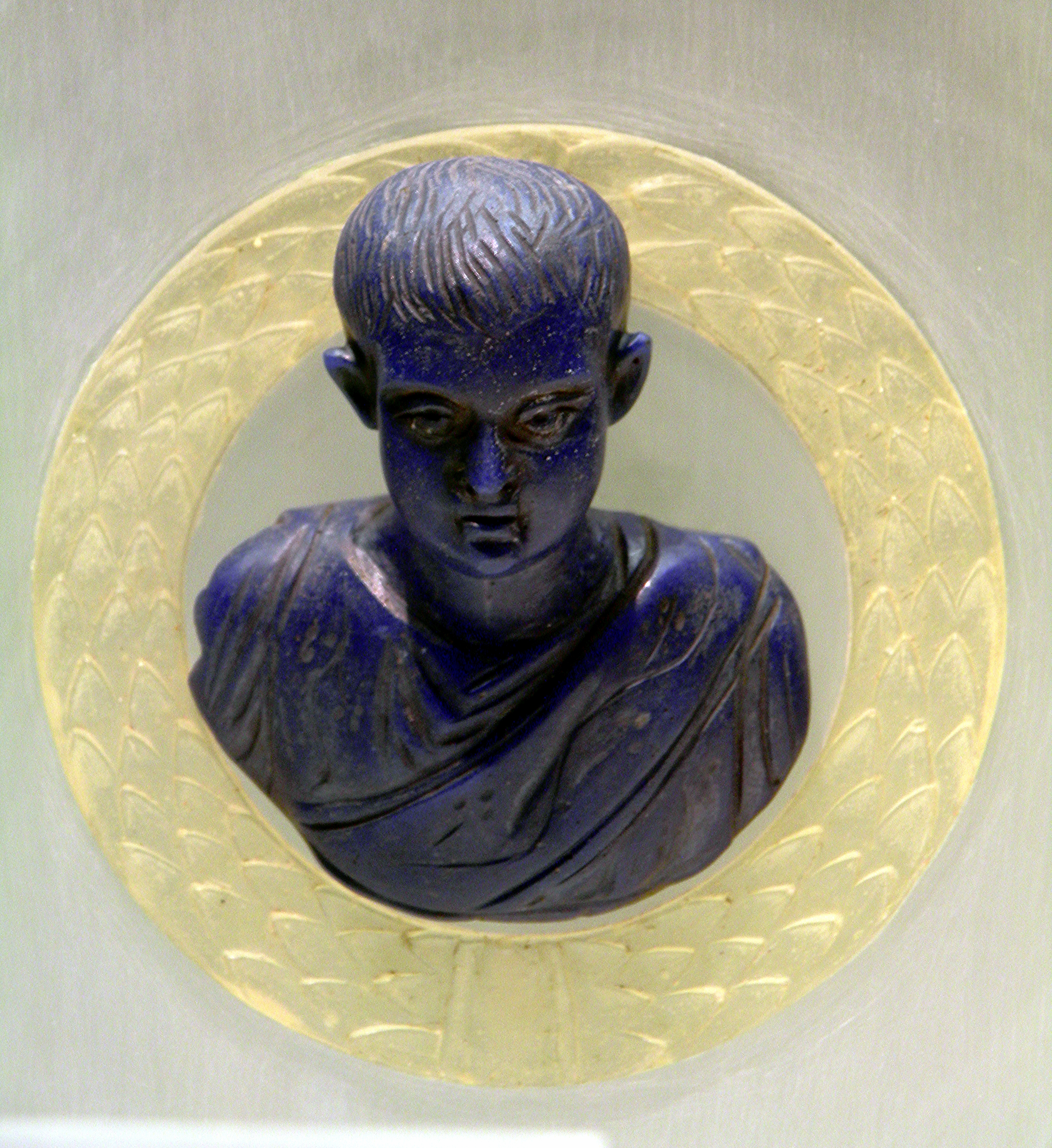
Bust of Constantius II while he was a prince, Romano-Germanic Museum, Cologne

Flavius Julius Constantius (Note: The origin of the name "Julius" is not known. It may have been added to his name in honour of one of Constantine's relatives, as one view identifies a "Julia Constantia" as Constantius I's mother. It was likely not in honour of Helena, mother of Constantine I, as she probably only adopted the name "Julia" just before her death.) was born in 317 at Sirmium, Pannonia, now Serbia. He was the third son of Constantine the Great, and second by his second wife Fausta, the daughter of Maximian. Constantius was made caesar by his father on 8 November 324, at the age of 7. In 336, religious unrest in Armenia and tense relations between Constantine and king Shapur II caused war to break out between Rome and Sassanid Persia. Though he made initial preparations for the war, Constantine fell ill and sent Constantius east to take command of the eastern frontier. Before Constantius arrived, the Persian general Narses, who was possibly the king's brother, overran Mesopotamia and captured Amida. Constantius promptly attacked Narses, and after suffering minor setbacks defeated and killed Narses at the battle of Narasara (336). Constantius captured Amida and initiated a major refortification of the city, enhancing the city's circuit walls and constructing large towers. He also built a new stronghold in the hinterland nearby, naming it Antinopolis.

== Augustus in the east ==
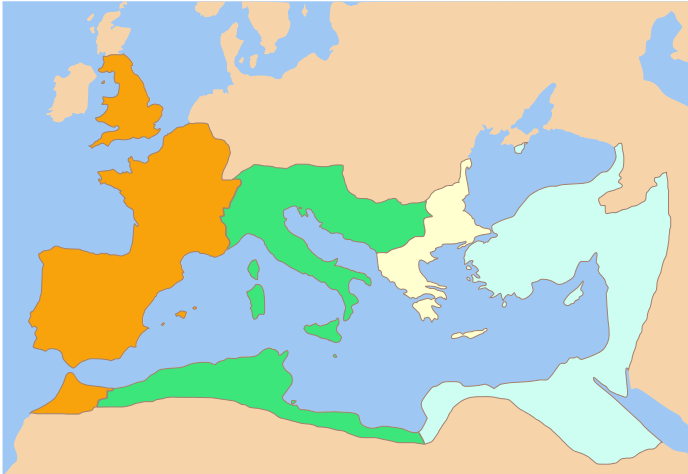
Division of the Roman Empire among the caesares appointed by Constantine the Great, before the death of Dalmatius

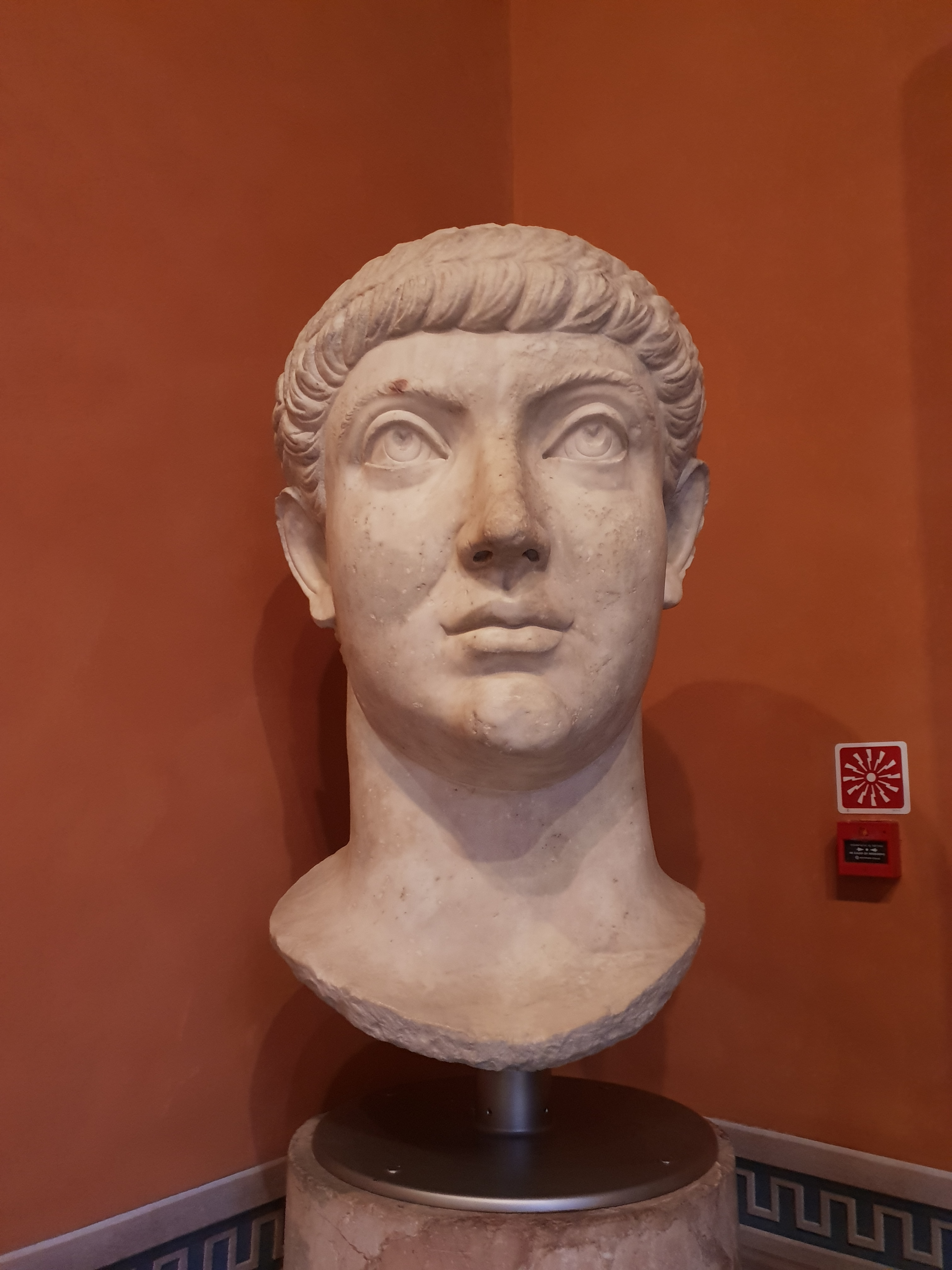
Bust of youthful Constantius II or Constans, Capitoline Museums

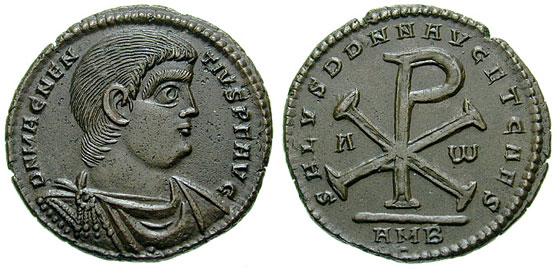
Bronze coin of Magnentius

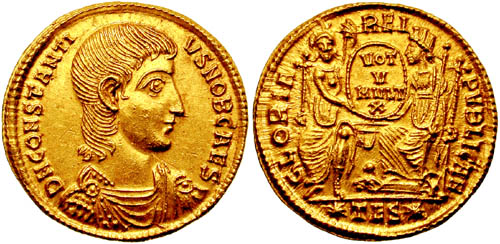
Gold solidus of Constantius Gallus. A paternal cousin of Constantius, he was made Caesar by Constantius in 350 and was married to the emperor's sister, Constantina. However, his mismanagement of the eastern provinces led to his death in 354.

In early 337, Constantius hurried to Constantinople after receiving news that his father was near death. After Constantine died, Constantius buried him with lavish ceremony in the Church of the Holy Apostles. Soon after his father's death, the army massacred his relatives descended from the marriage of his paternal grandfather Constantius Chlorus to Flavia Maximiana Theodora, though the details are unclear. Two of Constantius's uncles (Julius Constantius and Flavius Dalmatius) and seven of his cousins were killed, including Hannibalianus and Dalmatius, rulers of Pontus and Moesia respectively, leaving Constantius, his two brothers Constantine II and Constans, and three cousins Gallus, Julian and Nepotianus as the only surviving male relatives of Constantine the Great. While the “official version” was that Constantius's relatives were merely the victims of a mutinous army, Ammianus Marcellinus, Zosimus, Libanius, Athanasius and Julian all blamed Constantius for the event. Burgess considered the latter version to be “consistent with all the evidence”, pointing to multiple factors that he believed lined up with the massacre being a planned attack rather than a spontaneous mutiny:—the lack of high-profile punishments as a response; the sparing of all women; the attempted damnatio memoriae on the deceased; and the exile of the survivors Gallus and Julian. (Note: By 351–354, Constantius’s courtiers stopped denying his involvement and instead claimed he was tormented with guilt over his role in the massacre.)

Soon after, Constantius met his brothers in Pannonia at Sirmium to formalize the partition of the empire. Constantius received the eastern provinces, including Constantinople, Thrace, Asia Minor, Syria, Egypt, and Cyrenaica; Constantine received Britannia, Gaul, Hispania, and Mauretania; and Constans, initially under the supervision of Constantine II, received Italy, Africa, Illyricum, Pannonia, Macedonia, and Achaea.

Constantius then hurried east to Antioch to resume the war with Persia. While Constantius was away from the eastern frontier in early 337, King Shapur II assembled a large army, which included war elephants, and launched an attack on Roman territory, laying waste to Mesopotamia and putting the city of Nisibis under siege. Despite initial success, Shapur lifted his siege after his army missed an opportunity to exploit a collapsed wall. When Constantius learned of Shapur's withdrawal from Roman territory, he prepared his army for a counter-attack.

Constantius repeatedly defended the eastern border against invasions by the Sassanid Empire under Shapur. These conflicts were mainly limited to Sassanid sieges of the major fortresses of Roman Mesopotamia, including Nisibis (Nusaybin), Singara, and Amida (Diyarbakir). Although Shapur seems to have been victorious in most of these confrontations, the Sassanids were able to achieve little. However, the Romans won a decisive victory at the battle of Narasara, killing Shapur's brother, Narses. Ultimately, Constantius was able to push back the invasion, and Shapur failed to make any significant gains.

Meanwhile, Constantine II desired to retain control of Constans's realm, leading the brothers into open conflict. Constantine was killed in 340 near Aquileia during an ambush. As a result, Constans took control of his deceased brother's realms and became sole ruler of the Western two-thirds of the empire. This division lasted until January 350, when Constans was assassinated by forces loyal to the usurper Magnentius.

=== War against Magnentius ===
Constantius was determined to march west to fight the usurper. However, feeling that the east still required some sort of imperial presence, he elevated his cousin Constantius Gallus to caesar of the eastern provinces. As an extra measure to ensure the loyalty of his cousin, he married the elder of his two sisters, Constantina, to him.

Before facing Magnentius, Constantius first came to terms with Vetranio, a loyal general in Illyricum who had recently been acclaimed emperor by his soldiers. Vetranio immediately sent letters to Constantius pledging his loyalty, which Constantius may have accepted simply in order to stop Magnentius from gaining more support. These events may have been spurred by the action of Constantina, who had since traveled east to marry Gallus. Constantius subsequently sent Vetranio the imperial diadem and acknowledged the general's new position as augustus. However, when Constantius arrived, Vetranio willingly resigned his position and accepted Constantius's offer of a comfortable retirement in Bithynia.

In 351, Constantius clashed with Magnentius in Pannonia with a large army. The ensuing Battle of Mursa Major was one of the largest and bloodiest battles ever between two Roman armies. The result was a victory for Constantius, but a costly one. Magnentius survived the battle and, determined to fight on, withdrew into northern Italy. Rather than pursuing his opponent, however, Constantius turned his attention to securing the Danubian border, where he spent the early months of 352 campaigning against the Sarmatians along the middle Danube. After achieving his aims, Constantius advanced on Magnentius in Italy. This action led the cities of Italy to switch their allegiance to him and eject the usurper's garrisons. Again, Magnentius withdrew, this time to southern Gaul.

In 353, Constantius and Magnentius met for the final time at the Battle of Mons Seleucus in southern Gaul, and again Constantius emerged the victor. Magnentius, realizing the futility of continuing his position, committed suicide on 10 August 353.

== Solo reign ==
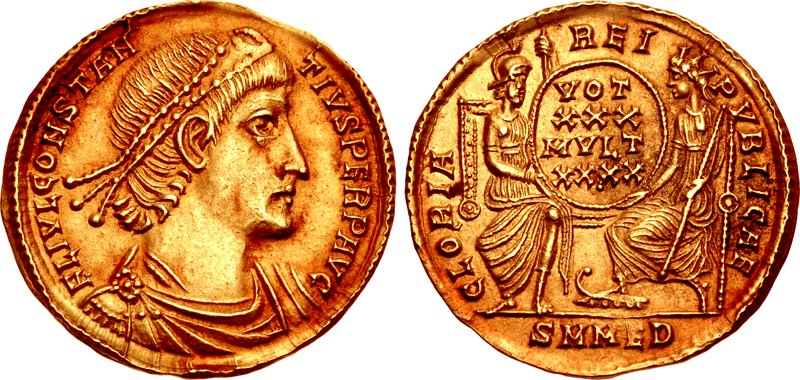
Solidus struck at Mediolanum in 354–357. The reverse reads gloria rei publicae, "glory of the republic".

Constantius spent much of the rest of 353 and early 354 on campaign against the Alamanni on the Danube frontier. The campaign was successful and raiding by the Alamanni ceased temporarily. In the meantime, Constantius had been receiving disturbing reports regarding the actions of his cousin Gallus. Possibly as a result of these reports, Constantius concluded a peace with the Alamanni and traveled to Mediolanum (Milan).

In Mediolanum, Constantius first summoned Ursicinus, Gallus's magister equitum, for reasons that remain unclear. Constantius then summoned Gallus and Constantina. Although Gallus and Constantina complied with the order at first, when Constantina died in Bithynia, Gallus began to hesitate. However, after some convincing by one of Constantius's agents, Gallus continued his journey west, passing through Constantinople and Thrace to Poetovio (Ptuj) in Pannonia.

In Poetovio, Gallus was arrested by the soldiers of Constantius under the command of Barbatio. Gallus was then moved to Pola and interrogated. Gallus claimed that it was Constantina who was to blame for all the trouble while he was in charge of the eastern provinces. This angered Constantius so greatly that he immediately ordered Gallus's execution. He soon changed his mind, however, and recanted the order. Unfortunately for Gallus, this second order was delayed by Eusebius, one of Constantius's eunuchs, and Gallus was executed.

=== Religious issues ===
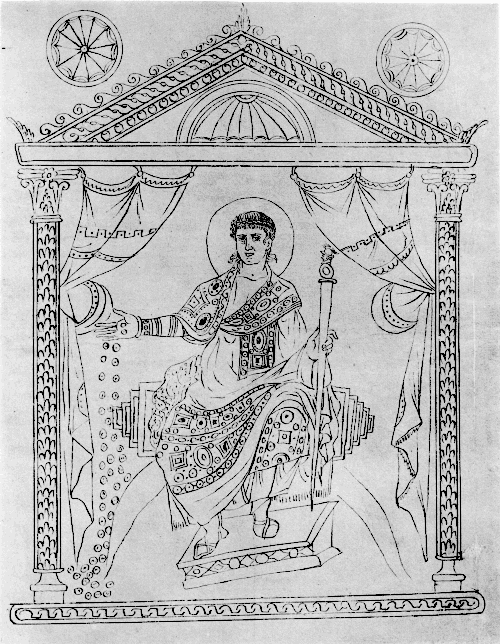
Constantius II depicted in the Chronography of 354 dispensing largesse (a Renaissance copy of a Carolingian copy)

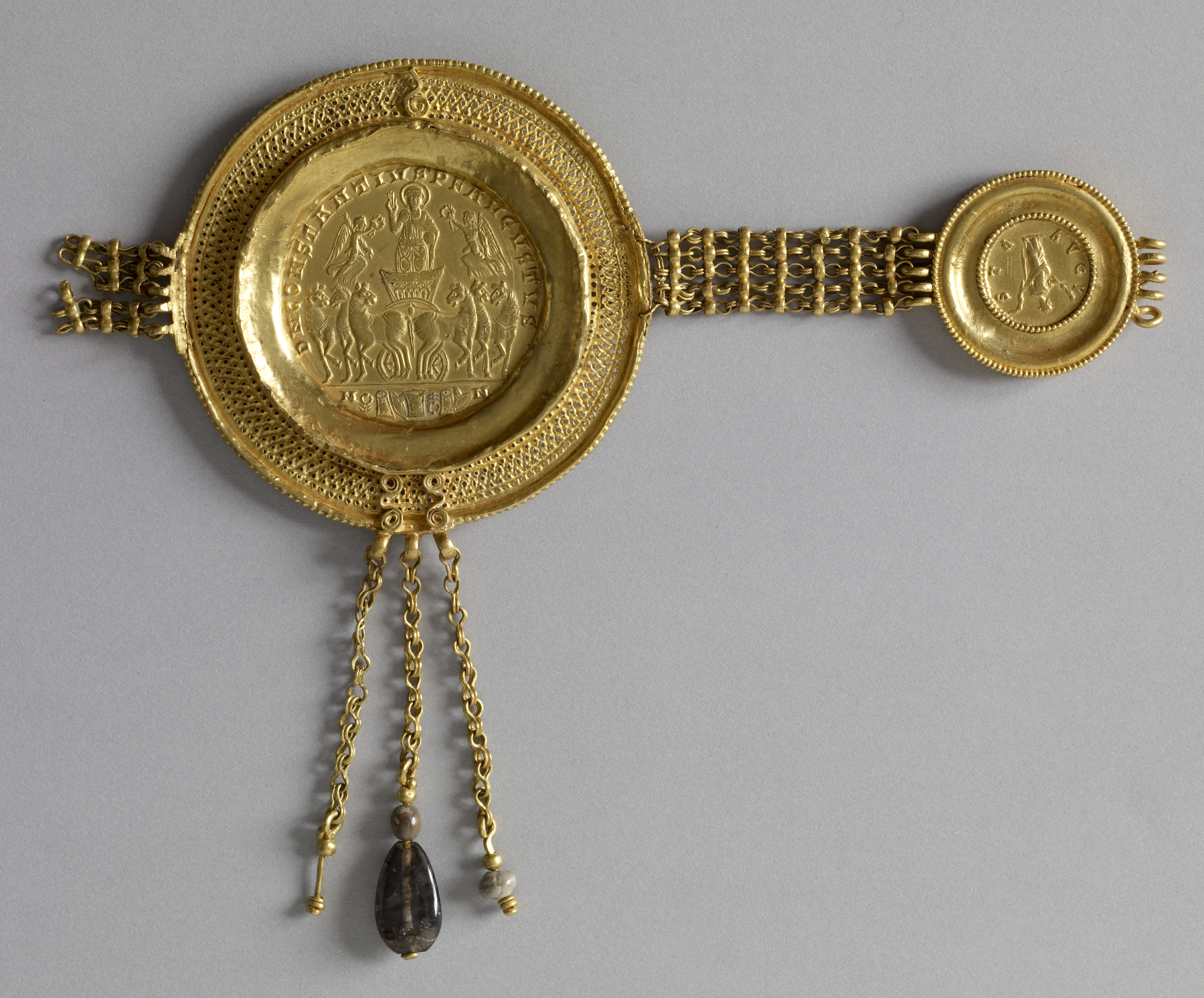
Section of a belt containing two gold medallions, the larger coin depicting the triumphant emperor in his chariot. The Walters Art Museum.

==== Paganism ====
Laws dating from the 350s prescribed the death penalty for those who performed or attended pagan sacrifices, and for the worshipping of idols. Pagan temples were shut down, and the Altar of Victory was removed from the Senate meeting house. There were also frequent episodes of ordinary Christians destroying, pillaging and desecrating many ancient pagan temples, tombs and monuments. Paganism was still popular among the population at the time. The emperor's policies were passively resisted by many governors and magistrates.

In spite of this, Constantius never made any attempt to disband the various Roman priestly colleges or the Vestal Virgins. He never acted against the various pagan schools. At times, he actually made some effort to protect paganism. In fact, he even ordered the election of a priest for Africa. Also, he remained pontifex maximus and was deified by the Roman Senate after his death. His relative moderation toward paganism is reflected by the fact that it was over twenty years after his death, during the reign of Gratian, that any pagan senator protested his treatment of their religion.

==== Christianity ====
Although often considered an Arian, Constantius ultimately preferred a third, compromise version that lay somewhere in between Arianism and the Nicene Creed, retrospectively called Semi-Arianism. During his reign he attempted to mold the Christian church to follow this compromise position, convening several Christian councils. "Unfortunately for his memory the theologians whose advice he took were ultimately discredited and the malcontents whom he pressed to conform emerged victorious," writes the historian A. H. M. Jones. "The great councils of 359–60 are therefore not reckoned ecumenical in the tradition of the church, and Constantius II is not remembered as a restorer of unity, but as a heretic who arbitrarily imposed his will on the church."

According to the Greek historian Philostorgius (d. 439) in his Ecclesiastical History, Constantius sent an Arian bishop known as Theophilus the Indian (also known as "Theophilus of Yemen") to Tharan Yuhanim, then the king of the South Arabian Himyarite Kingdom to convert the people to Christianity. According to the report, Theophilus succeeded in establishing three churches, one of them in the capital Zafar.

==== Judaism ====
Judaism faced some severe restrictions under Constantius, who seems to have followed an anti-Jewish policy in line with that of his father. This included edicts to limit the ownership of slaves by Jewish people and banning marriages between Jews and Christian women. Later edicts sought to discourage conversions from Christianity to Judaism by confiscating the apostate's property. However, Constantius's actions in this regard may not have been so much to do with Jewish religion as with Jewish business—apparently, privately owned Jewish businesses were often in competition with state-owned businesses. As a result, Constantius may have sought to provide an advantage to state-owned businesses by limiting the skilled workers and slaves available to Jewish businesses.

=== Further crises ===
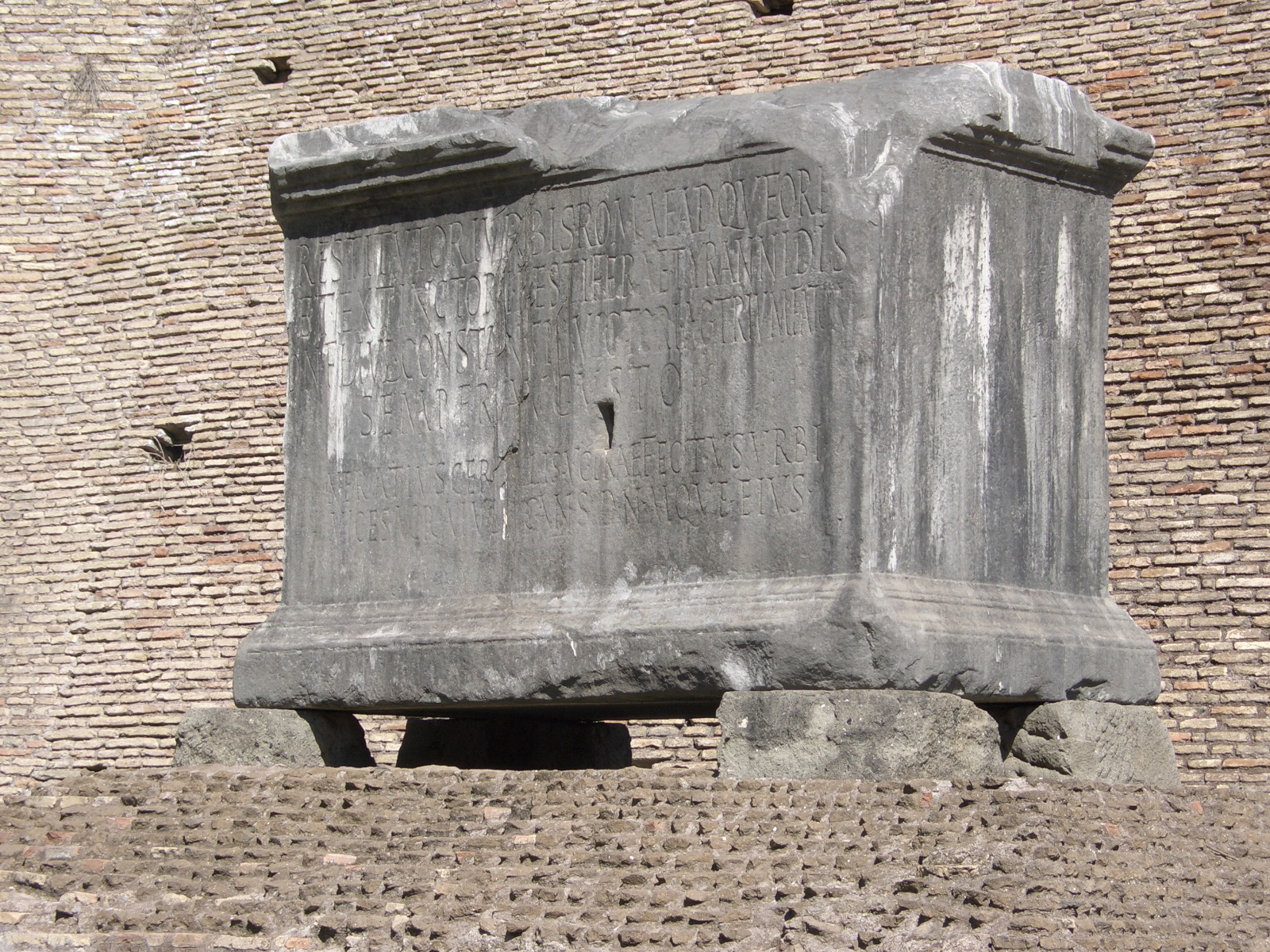
Base of an equestrian statue of Constantius in the Roman Forum (CIL VI, 1158)

On 11 August 355, the magister militum Claudius Silvanus revolted in Gaul. Silvanus had surrendered to Constantius after the Battle of Mursa Major. Constantius had made him magister militum in 353 with the purpose of blocking the German threats, a feat that Silvanus achieved by bribing the German tribes with the money he had collected. A plot organized by members of Constantius's court led the emperor to recall Silvanus. After Silvanus revolted, he received a letter from Constantius recalling him to Milan, but which made no reference to the revolt. Ursicinus, who was meant to replace Silvanus, bribed some troops, and Silvanus was killed.

Constantius realised that too many threats still faced the Empire, however, and he could not possibly handle all of them by himself. So on 6 November 355, he elevated his last remaining male relative, Julian, to the rank of caesar. A few days later, Julian was married to Helena, the last surviving sister of Constantius. Constantius soon sent Julian off to Gaul.

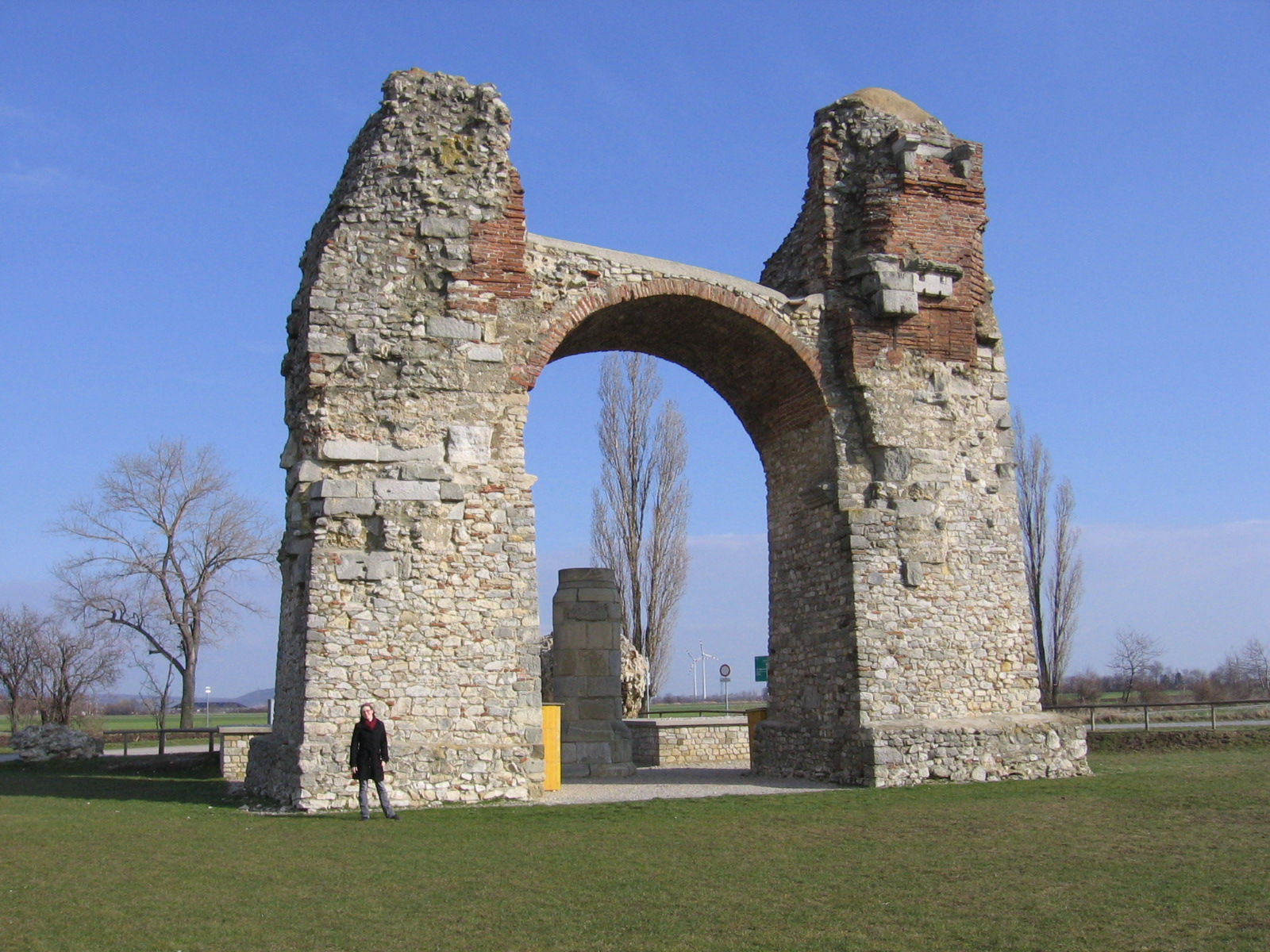
Triumphal arch of Constantius II in Carnuntum, Pannonia

Constantius spent the next few years overseeing affairs in the western part of the empire primarily from his base at Mediolanum. In April–May 357 he visited Rome for the only time in his life. The same year, he forced Sarmatian and Quadi invaders out of Pannonia and Moesia Inferior, then led a successful counter-attack across the Danube.

In the winter of 357–58, Constantius received ambassadors from Shapur II who demanded that Rome restore the lands surrendered by Narseh. Despite rejecting these terms, Constantius tried to avert war with the Sassanid Empire by sending two embassies to Shapur II. Shapur II nevertheless launched another invasion of Roman Mesopotamia. In 360, when news reached Constantius that Shapur II had destroyed Singara (Sinjar), and taken Kiphas (Hasankeyf), Amida (Diyarbakır), and Ad Tigris (Cizre), he decided to travel east to face the re-emergent threat.

=== Usurpation of Julian and crises in the east ===
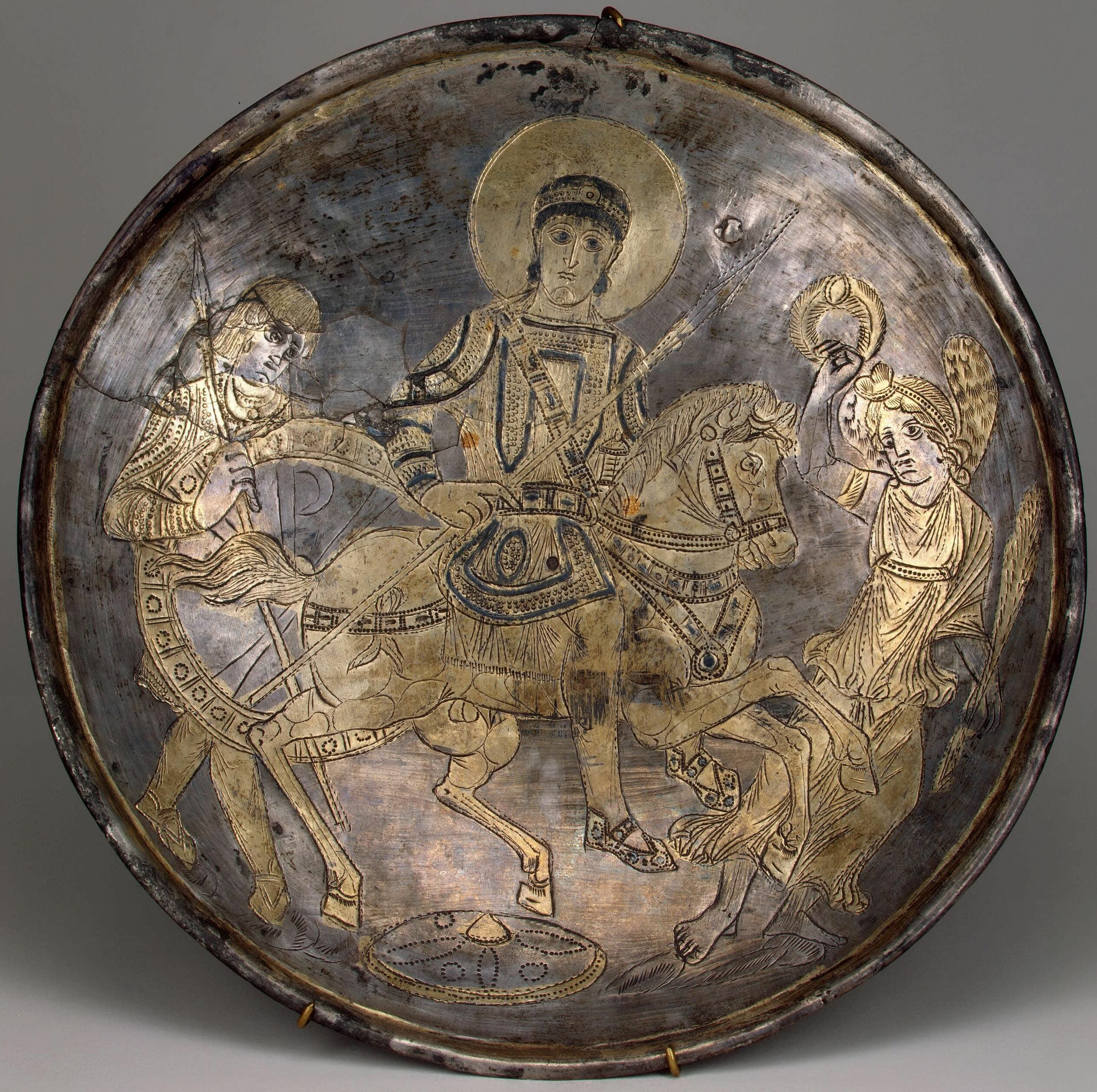
Missorium of Kerch depicting Constantius II on horseback with a spear. He is preceded by victory and accompanied by a guardsman (Hermitage Museum).

In the meantime, Julian had won some victories against the Alamanni, who had once again invaded Roman Gaul. However, when Constantius requested reinforcements from Julian's army for the eastern campaign, the Gallic legions revolted and proclaimed Julian augustus. (Note: Ammianus and Julian both portrayed Constantius's order as fueled by envy of the Caesar’s growing popularity, with the additional intent of weakening his military position, as he had previously done with Gallus. Crawford was skeptical of such a portrayal, believing that Julian would’ve needed far less troops than Constantius if he was really as successful as he portrayed himself, while Potter dismissed the idea, believing that the necessity of Constantius's act for his plan was sufficient explanation.)

On account of the immediate Sassanid threat, Constantius was unable to directly respond to his cousin's usurpation, other than by sending missives in which he tried to convince Julian to resign the title of augustus and be satisfied with that of caesar. By 361, Constantius saw no alternative but to face the usurper with force, and yet the threat of the Sassanids remained. Constantius had already spent part of early 361 unsuccessfully attempting to re-take the fortress of Ad Tigris. After a time he had withdrawn to Antioch to regroup and prepare for a confrontation with Shapur II. The campaigns of the previous year had inflicted heavy losses on the Sassanids, however, and they did not attempt another round of campaigns that year. This temporary respite in hostilities allowed Constantius to turn his full attention to facing Julian.

=== Death ===
Constantius immediately gathered his forces and set off west. However, by the time he reached Mopsuestia in Cilicia, it was clear that he was fatally ill and would not survive to face Julian. The sources claim that realising his death was near, Constantius had himself baptised by Euzoius, the Semi-Arian bishop of Antioch, and then declared that Julian was his rightful successor. (Note: Ammianus only recorded Constantius's legitimization of Julian as a rumor. While Hunt and Matthews treated the report with caution, Kelly considered it to be true, observing that the act prevented civil war and protected his posthumous reputation, as well as his wife’s unborn child. Errington and Crawford also accepted it as true, viewing it as a display of pragmatism and dynastic solidarity.) Constantius II died of fever on 3 November 361.

Like Constantine the Great, he was buried in the Church of the Holy Apostles, in a porphyry sarcophagus that was described in the 10th century by Constantine VII Porphyrogenitus in the De Ceremoniis.

== Marriages and children ==
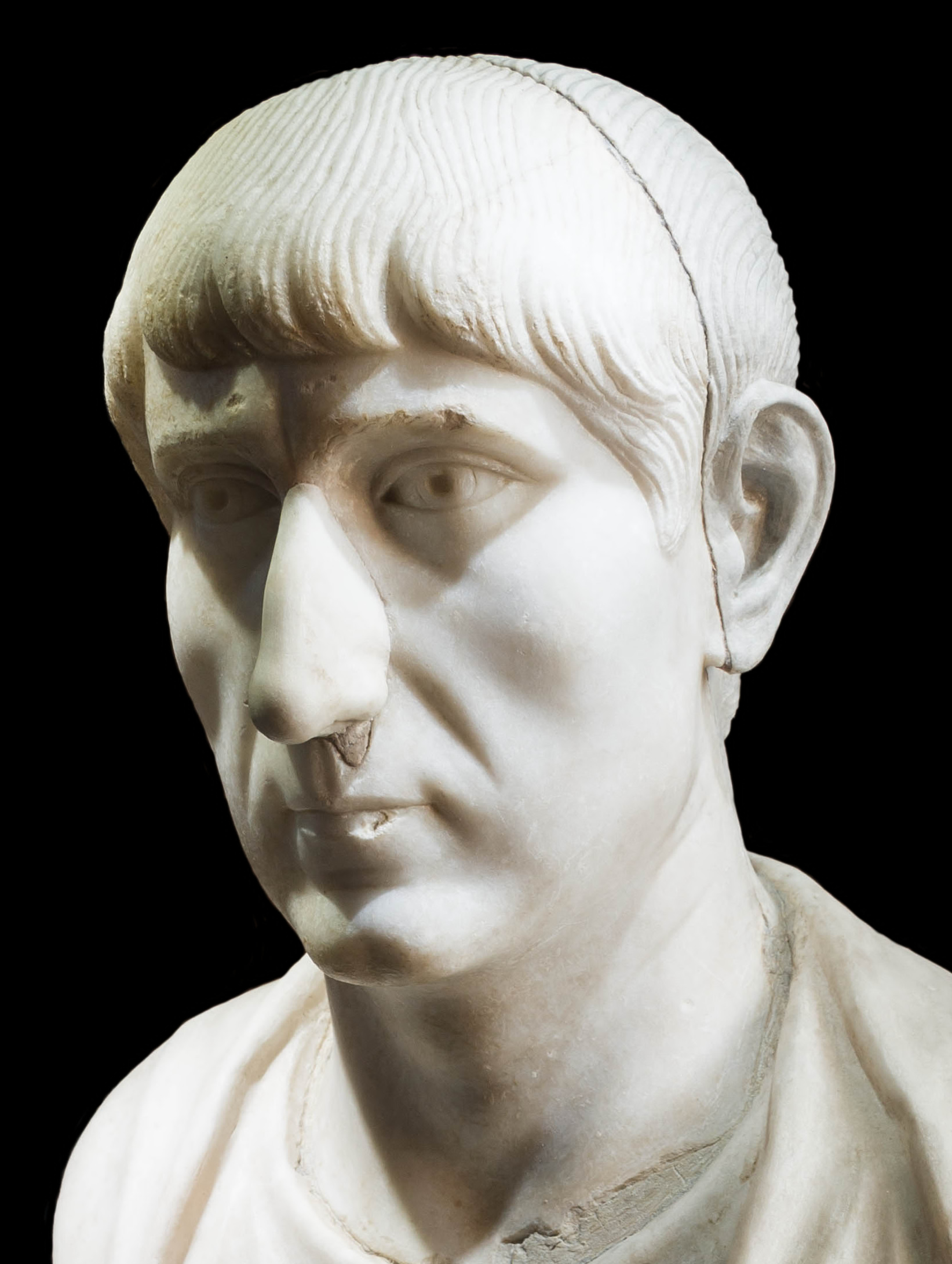
Presumed bust of Constantius II (or Valens), from an exhibition at the Colosseum, 2013

Constantius II was married three times:

First to a daughter of his half-uncle Julius Constantius, whose name is unknown. She was a full-sister of Gallus and a half-sister of Julian. She died c. 352/3.

Second, to Eusebia, a woman of Macedonian origin, originally from the city of Thessalonica, whom Constantius married before his defeat of Magnentius in 353. She died before 361.

Third and lastly, in 361, to Faustina, who gave birth to Constantius's only child, a posthumous daughter named Constantia, who later married Emperor Gratian.

== Family tree ==
CONSTANTINIAN DYNASTY detailed family tree

Afranius Hannibalianus	Eutropia	Maximian; Western emperor
Theodora	Constantius I Chlorus; Western emperor 250-305-306	Helena; 250–330	Maxentius; Western emperor
Constantia; 293–330 ∞ Licinius; 250-308-324-325	Flavius Dalmatius censor	1.Galla	Julius Constantius d. 337 ∞ 2.Basilina	Anastasia	Eutropia	Fausta; 289–326	Constantine I the Great; 272-306-337	Minervina
Dalmatius caesar	Hannibalianus	(1) Constantius Gallus	(2) Julian; 331-360-363	Helena d. 360	Constantina ∞ 1.Hannibalianus; 2.Constantius Gallus	Constantius II; 317-337-361 ∞ Faustina	Constantine II; Western emperor 316-337-340	Constans I Western emperor 320-337-350	(daughter) ∞ Justus	Crispus d. 326
Jovian; 331-363-364	Marina Severa	Valentinian I Western emperor VALENTINIANIC DYNASTY	Justina
Constantia; 361–383	Gratian; Western emperor 359-367-383	Galla	Theodosius I Eastern emperor THEODOSIAN DYNASTY

Family of Constantius II

Emperors are shown with a rounded-corner border with their dates as Augusti, names with a thicker border appear in both sections

1: Constantine's parents and half-siblings

Claudius Gothicus; 268–270; fabricated ancestry
Helena	Constantius I; 305–306	Flavia Maximiana Theodora
Constantine I; 306–337	Flavius Dalmatius	Hannibalianus	Flavia Julia Constantia	Licinius; 308–324	Anastasia	Bassianus
Galla	Julius Constantius	Basilina	Licinius II	Eutropia	Virius Nepotianus
Hannibalianus	Constantina	Constantius Gallus	Julian; 360–363	Helena	Nepotianus

2: Constantine's children

Minervina	Constantine I; 306–337	Fausta
Crispus	Constantine II; 337–340	Constans; 337–350	Hannibalianus	Constantina	Constantius Gallus
Faustina	Constantius II; 337–361	Helena	Julian; 360–363
Gratian; 367–383	Constantia

== Reputation ==
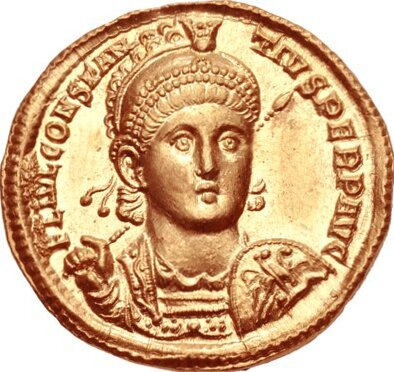
Solidus of Constantius II with a three-quarter facing portrait, struck c. 355. This obverse later served as the model for most Byzantine coinage after 395.

According to DiMaio and Frakes, “...Constantius is hard for the modern historian to fully understand both due to his own actions and due to the interests of the authors of primary sources for his reign.” A. H. M. Jones writes that he "appears in the pages of Ammianus as a conscientious emperor but a vain and stupid man, an easy prey to flatterers. He was timid and suspicious, and interested persons could easily play on his fears for their own advantage." However, Kent and M. and A. Hirmer suggest that the emperor "has suffered at the hands of unsympathetic authors, ecclesiastical and civil alike. To orthodox churchmen he was a bigoted supporter of the Arian heresy, to Julian the Apostate and the many who have subsequently taken his part he was a murderer, a tyrant and inept as a ruler". They go on to add, "Most contemporaries seem in fact to have held him in high esteem, and he certainly inspired loyalty in a way his brother could not".

Eutropius wrote of him,

He was a man of a remarkably tranquil disposition, good-natured, trusting too much to his friends and courtiers, and at last too much in the power of his wives. He conducted himself with great moderation in the commencement of his reign; he enriched his friends, and suffered none, whose active services he had experienced, to go unrewarded. He was however somewhat inclined to severity, whenever any suspicion of an attempt on the government was excited in him; otherwise he was gentle. His fortune is more to be praised in civil than in foreign wars.

== See also ==
- Persian wars of Constantius II
- Itineraries of the Roman emperors, 337–363

== Notes ==
Constantius II Constantinian dynasty Born: 7 August 317 Died: 3 November 361
Regnal titles
Preceded by Constantine I	Roman emperor 337–361; With: Constantine II and Constans in the West	Succeeded by Julian
Political offices
Preceded by Sex. Anicius Paulinus; Julius Julianus	Roman consul 326 with Constantine Augustus	Succeeded by Flavius Constantius; Valerius Maximus
Preceded by Ursus; Polemius	Roman consul II; 339 with Constans Augustus	Succeeded by Septimius Acindynus; L. Aradius Valerius Proculus
Preceded by Petronius Probinus; Antonius Marcellinus	Roman consul III; 342 with Constans Augustus II	Succeeded by M. Furius Placidus; Romulus
Preceded by Amantius; M. Nummius Albinus	Roman consul IV; 346 with Constans Augustus III	Succeeded by Vulcacius Rufinus; Eusebius
Preceded by Magnentius; Gaiso	Roman consul V–VII; 352–354 with Constantius Caesar	Succeeded by Arbitio; Lollianus Mavortius
Preceded by Arbitio; Lollianus Mavortius	Roman consul VIII–IX; 356–357 with Julian Caesar	Succeeded by Censorius Datianus; Neratius Cerealis
Preceded by Eusebius; Hypatius	Roman consul X 360 with Julian Caesar	Succeeded by Taurus; Florentius
