= Julius Constantius's daughter =

Roman empress from 337 to 353

Unknown

Roman empress
- Tenure: 337 – c. 352/353
- Died: before August 353
- Spouse: Constantius II
- Dynasty: Constantinian
- Father: Julius Constantius
- Mother: Galla

A daughter of Julius Constantius and Galla, of unknown name, (Note: Her name was probably Galla, Julia or Constantia, the names of her parents.) was Roman empress as the first wife of Constantius II.

== Family ==
She is mentioned in the "Letter To The Senate And People of Athens" by Emperor Julian to have been a sister of Constantius Gallus. When mentioning the execution of Gallus by orders of Constantius II, Julian lists the several ways the two men were related. "Constantius gave over to his most inveterate enemies, his own cousin, the Caesar, his sister's husband, the father of his niece, the man whose own sister he had himself married in earlier days".

Gallus was a son of Julius Constantius and his first wife Galla. She is assumed to be a full sister of Gallus. Julius Constantius was a son of Constantius Chlorus and Flavia Maximiana Theodora. He was a paternal half-brother of Constantine I. Constantine died in 337 and several of his relatives were killed shortly thereafter, including Julius Constantius. The event is reported in the "History of the Arians" (358) by Athanasius of Alexandria, in a denunciation of Constantius II. "The common feelings of humanity could not induce him to spare even his own kindred… he commiserated not the sufferings of his father-in-law, though he had married his daughter…" Though Constantius had two later marriages, this is considered a reference to Julius Constantius.

A brother is considered to have been assassinated with their father in 337. Julian the Apostate was a younger, paternal half-brother to this Empress.

== Marriage ==
Her marriage to Constantius seems to be recorded in the Life of Constantine by Eusebius of Caesarea. "On the completion of the thirtieth year of his [Constantine's] reign he solemnized the marriage of his second son [Constantius II], having concluded that of his first-born long before. This was an occasion of great joy and festivity, the emperor himself attending on his son at the ceremony, and entertaining the guests of both sexes, the men and women in distinct and separate companies, with sumptuous hospitality. Rich presents likewise were liberally distributed among the cities and people." The marriage can be estimated to 335 or 336. Constantine I had been declared emperor in 306.

Neither her name nor the time of her death appear in surviving sources. Thomas M. Banchich, a modern historian, points that "her passing may have facilitated Gallus' fall in 353/4". The "Panegyric In Honour Of Eusebia" by Julian the Apostate places the marriage of Eusebia, second wife of Constantius, prior to the defeat of rival emperor Magnentius. Magnentius was dead by August, 353. The marriage of Constantius and Eusebia may have occurred earlier in the year.
