= Flavius Claudius Constantinus =

Flavius Claudius Constantinus may refer to:

- Constantine II (emperor)
- Constantine III (Western Roman emperor)
