= Julius Julianus =

Roman statesman

Julius Julianus (fl. 315–325) was a Roman politician, the grandfather and namesake of the future emperor Julian.

== Life ==
He served Licinius as praetorian prefect from at least spring 315 to September 324, until Constantine I definitively defeated Licinius. However, the fall of Licinius did not mark the end of Julianus' career, as Constantine had praised Julianus' administration of the State and chose him, in 325, as suffect to replace a consul fallen in disgrace, Valerius Proculus. He also served as Praefectus Aegypti in 328.

He was the father of Basilina, wife of Constantine's half-brother Julius Constantius and mother of Emperor Julian, and of the mother of Procopius; he was probably related to Eusebius of Nicomedia. Julianus was the master of the Gothic philosopher slave Mardonius, who was the teacher of both Basilina and Julian.

Political offices
Preceded by Crispus Caesar III; Constantine Caesar III	Roman consul 325 with Sex. Anicius Paulinus	Succeeded by Constantine Augustus VII; Constantius Caesar
