= Flavius Claudius =

Flavius Claudius can refer to:

- Julian (emperor) (Flavius Claudius Julianus) (331–363), Roman emperor from 361 to 363
- Constantine II (emperor) (Flavius Claudius Constantinus) (316–340), Roman emperor from 337 to 340.
- Constantine III (western emperor) (Flavius Claudius Constantinus), Roman emperor from 407 to 411
