= Julius Constantius =

Father of emperor Julian (died 337)

- Born: after 293
- Died: 337
- Spouse: Galla; Basilina
- Issue: Son of unknown name Daughter of unknown name Gallus; Julian
- Dynasty: Constantinian
- Father: Constantius I
- Mother: Theodora

Flavius Julius Constantius (died 337 AD) was a member of the Constantinian dynasty, being a son of Emperor Constantius Chlorus and his wife Flavia Maximiana Theodora, a younger half-brother of Emperor Constantine the Great and the father of Emperor Julian.

== Biography ==
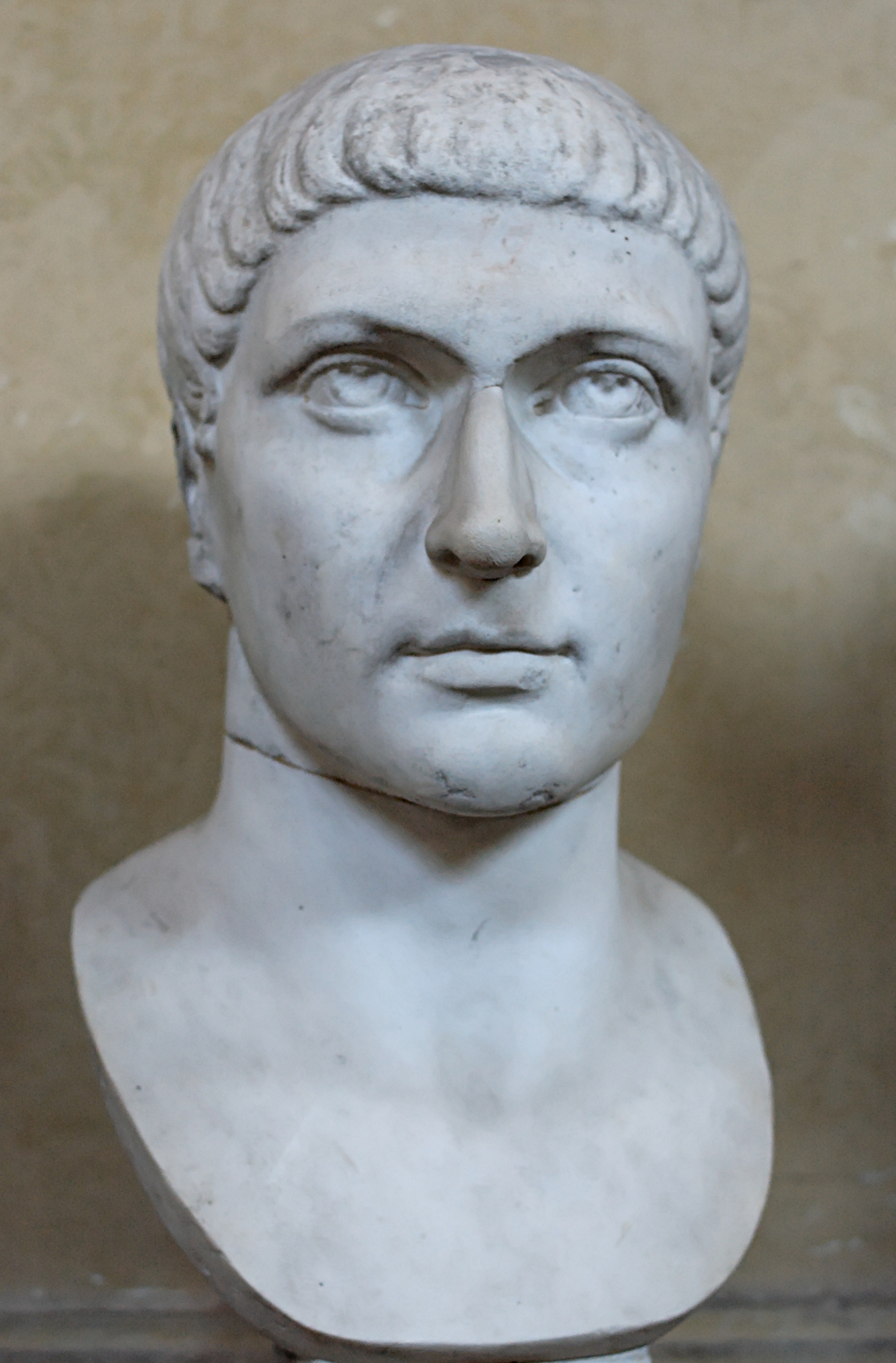
Constantine the Great, Julius Constantius' half-brother

Julius Constantius was the son of Constantius Chlorus and his wife Theodora. He had a brother, Dalmatius and three sisters, Constantia, Anastasia and Eutropia. Emperor Constantine I was his half-brother, as he was the son of Constantius and Helena.

Julius Constantius was married twice. With his first wife, Galla, sister of the later consuls Vulcacius Rufinus and Neratius Cerealis, he had two sons and a daughter. His eldest son, whose name is not recorded, was murdered in 337 together with his father. His second son Gallus, would later be appointed Caesar by Gallus’ cousin Constantius II. His daughter was the first wife of Constantius II. It has been proposed that Galla and Julius had another daughter, who may have been the mother of the empress Justina.

After the death of his first wife, Julius Constantius married a Greek woman Basilina, the daughter of the governor of Egypt, Julius Julianus. Basilina gave him another son, the future emperor Julian, but died before her husband in 332/333.

Allegedly at the instigation of Constantine's mother Helena, Julius Constantius did not live initially at the court of his half brother, but together with Dalmatius and Hannibalianus in Tolosa, in Etruria, the birthplace of his son Gallus, and in Corinth. It was only after Helena’s death that he was called to Constantinople, and was able to build a good relationship with Constantine.

Constantine favoured his half-brother, appointing him patricius and Consul for the year 335, together with Ceionius Rufius Albinus. However, after the death of Constantine in 337, several male members of the Constantinian dynasty were killed on the orders of Constantius II, among them Constantius (whose property was confiscated) and his eldest son; his two younger sons, however, survived, because in 337 they were still children. They would later be elevated to the rank of caesar and augustus, respectively.

== Sources ==
- Burgess, R.W. (2008). "THE SUMMER OF BLOOD: The "Great Massacre" of 337 and the Promotion of the Sons of Constantine". Dumbarton Oaks Papers. 62: 5–51. JSTOR 20788042.
- Crawford, Peter (2016). Constantius II: Usurpers, Eunuchs, and the Antichrist. ISBN 978-1-78340-055-3.
- Martindale, John R.; Jones, A. H. M.; Morris, John, eds. (1971). The Prosopography of the Later Roman Empire: Volume I, AD 260–395. Cambridge: Cambridge University Press. ISBN 0-521-07233-6.

Political offices
Preceded by Flavius Optatus; Amnius Anicius Paulinus	Roman consul 335 with Ceionius Rufius Albinus	Succeeded by Virius Nepotianus; Tettius Facundus
