= Justina (empress) =

Roman empress c. 370–375

Roman empress
- Tenure: c. 370–375
- Born: c. 340
- Died: 388 (aged 47–48)
- Spouse: Magnentius; Valentinian I
- Issue others...: Valentinian II; Galla
- Dynasty: Valentinianic dynasty by marriage; Constantinian dynasty by birth
- Father: Justus, consularis of Picenum
- Mother: unnamed descendant of Constantine I
- Religion: Arian Christianity

Justina (Latin: Iustina; c. 340 – c. 388) was a Roman empress. She was initially the wife of the rebel emperor Magnentius and was then married to Valentinian I, with whom she had four children, including the emperor Valentinian II and the empress Galla.

Possibly a descendant of the Constantinian dynasty, she was Valentinian's second wife after Marina Severa, and stepmother of the augustus Gratian and the mother-in-law of the augustus Theodosius I. Her young son Valentinian was made emperor shortly after her husband's death in November 375. According to Late Antique ecclesiastical history, Justina was an Arian Christian, and began to promote this christology after her husband died, bringing her into conflict with Ambrose, the Nicene Christian bishop of Mediolanum (Milan). In 387, fleeing from the invasion of the Italian Peninsula by the emperor Magnus Maximus, Justina took her children to the Balkans – including the child-emperor Valentinian II – and secured the intervention of the eastern emperor Theodosius in the civil war by marrying her daughter Galla to him at Thessalonica. Afterwards, Theodosius attacked and defeated Magnus Maximus, ending the civil war, during which time Justina herself died.

== Family ==
Justina was a daughter of Justus, governor of Picenum under Constantius II. According to Socrates of Constantinople, "Justus the father of Justina, who had been governor of Picenum under the reign of Constantius, had a dream in which he seemed to himself to bring forth the imperial purple out of his right side. When this dream had been told to many persons, it at length came to the knowledge of Constantius, who conjecturing it to be a presage that a descendant of Justus would become emperor, caused him to be assassinated."

Justina had two known brothers, Constantius and Cerealis. One of her daughters was named Galla. In La Pseudobigamie de Valentinien I (1958), J. Rougé argues all three names were representative of their descent from the Neratii, an aristocratic family connected to the Constantinian dynasty through marriage. According to the Prosopography of the Later Roman Empire the names Justus and Justina may also indicate a relation to the Vettius family.

The Prosopography mentions a theory that Justus was a son of Vettius Justus, Consul in 328, and a woman of the Neratius family. The latter family produced several relatively notable members in the early 4th century. The first was Galla, wife of Julius Constantius and mother of Constantius Gallus. Her brothers were Neratius Cerealis, Consul in 358 and Vulcacius Rufinus, Praetorian prefect of Italy from 365 to his death in 368.

Timothy Barnes has theorised that Justina was a granddaughter or great-granddaughter of Crispus through her mother, whose name is unknown, another suggestion is that her mother was the daughter of Julius Constantius and his first wife, the aforementioned Galla. Hence, this makes Justina at the heart of the family connexions between the Constantinian and the Valentinianic (and later Theodosian) dynasties.

David Woods points out that Themistius thanked Constantius II for saving the empire from "bastard and spurious successors", which probably meant the future children of Justina and usurper Magnentius. Thus, in Woods' opinion, Justina indeed belonged to the Constantinian dynasty, but was of illegitimate descent. According to the first version presented by him, Justina was a maternal granddaughter of Crispus, who could be deemed illegitimate by Constantius II. Another possibility is that Justina was born out of wedlock to Constans I and Justus's wife, but Justus was forced to recognize her as his daughter. (Note: A notion that Constans was a homosexual is usually rejected by modern scholars as a piece of hostile propaganda.)

== Marriage to Magnentius ==
Justina was first married to Magnentius, a Roman usurper, from 350 to 353. Both Zosimus and the fragmentary chronicle of John of Antioch, a 7th-century monk tentatively identified with John of the Sedre, report that Justina was too young at the time of her first marriage to have children.

== Empress and marriage to Valentinian I ==
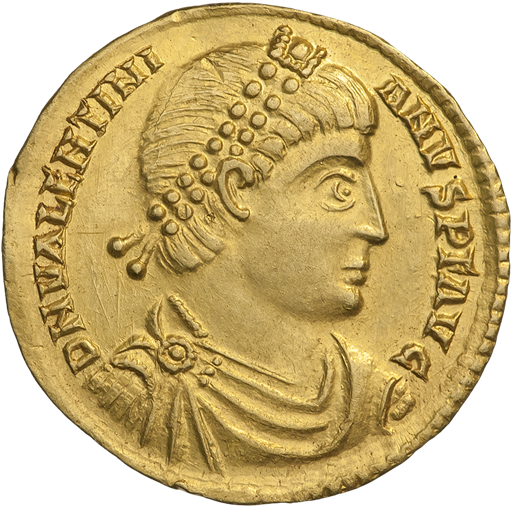
Solidus of Valentinian I

In c. 370, Justina became the second wife of Valentinian I after his divorce. Barnes observed that Christian writers appeared to be embarrassed by his act, as few sources name his first wife. There are two different reports of the exact circumstances. The one given by John Malalas, the Chronicon Paschale and John of Nikiû say Severa committed fraud and was exiled, though Barnes considers it to be an attempt to justify the divorce of Valentinian I without blaming the emperor. The other version, given by Socrates, Jordanes and Theodorus Lector, has no mention of Valentinian's first wife being disgraced, and says that Justina met the emperor when Severa introduced the two.

Justina became the stepmother of Gratian, Valentinian's son from his previous marriage. The couple had four additional children: a son, Valentinian II, and three daughters, Galla, Grata and Justa. According to Socrates, Grata and Justa remained unmarried. They were still alive in 392 but not mentioned afterwards.

== Widowhood and the reign of Valentinian II ==
Valentinian I died in 375 in Aquincum, and Gratian inherited the western throne. According to Ammianus Marcellinus, Zosimus and Philostorgius, Justina and her son Valentinian were living near Sirmium when she was widowed. Quickly, general Cerealis, her brother, brought the younger Valentinian to Aquincum where the troops proclaimed him emperor without consulting the emperor Gratian. Afterward Justina accompanied the young Valentinian II to Mediolanum (modern Milan), where she assisted with his rule.

In 383, the usurper Magnus Maximus killed Gratian and took control of Britain, Gaul, Hispania and the Diocese of Africa. He ruled from his capital at Augusta Treverorum (Treves, Trier) and was able to negotiate his recognition by Valentinian II and Theodosius I, starting from 384. The domain of Valentinian II had effectively been limited to Italia, ruling from Mediolanum.

Justina was an Arian, though unable to act in favor of her religious faction until after the death of her husband. She maintained a long struggle against Ambrose, leader of the Nicene faction in Milan. The dispute started in 385 when Ambrose refused the imperial court's demand for the Arian usage of a basilica for Easter, a cause which Justina championed. Many church historians influenced by Ambrose's rhetoric wrote negative accounts about her, stating that she persecuted the bishop for selfish reasons. However, Justina was not the only person in the court pursuing the Arian worship, since Gothic soldiers and some high-ranking civilian and military officials under Valentinian also had a stake in it.

In 387, Maximus broke his truce with Valentinian II by crossing the Alps into the Po Valley, where he threatened Mediolanum. Justina, Valentinian and Galla fled to Thessaloniki, capital of the Praetorian prefecture of Illyricum and at the time chosen residence of Theodosius. Theodosius was a widower, his first wife Aelia Flaccilla having died in 386. He granted refuge to the fugitives, and commenced negotiations in which Justina took part. At the conclusion, Theodosius married Galla and agreed to reinstall Valentinian.

In July–August, 388, the combined troops of Theodosius I and Valentinian II invaded the territory of Maximus under the leadership of Richomeres, Arbogast, Promotus and Timasius. After a series of losses, Maximus was arrested in Aquileia and executed on 28 August 388. Theodosius sent Valentinian to the West; Zosimus believes that Justina intended to go with her son, but she died within the same year.

== Sources ==
- Barnes, Timothy D. (1998). Ammianus Marcellinus and the Representation of Historical Reality (Cornell Studies in Classical Philology). Cornell University Press. ISBN 080143526-9.
- Belleli, Amélie. "Justine en Jézabel. La fabrication textuelle d’une mauvaise impératrice romaine dans la première moitié du v^{e} siècle", Revue des Etudes Tardo-antiques, n°6, 2016, pp. 93–107.
- Charles, Robert H. (2007) [1916]. The Chronicle of John, Bishop of Nikiu: Translated from Zotenberg's Ethiopic Text. Merchantville, NJ: Evolution Publishing. ISBN 9781889758879.
- Camphausen, Hans v., 1929. Ambrosius von Mailand als Kirchenpolitiker. Berlin/Leipzig.
- Homes Dudden, A., 1935. The Life and Times of St. Ambrose. Oxford.
- Martindale, John R.; Jones, A. H. M.; Morris, John, eds. (1971). The Prosopography of the Later Roman Empire: Volume I, AD 260–395. Cambridge: Cambridge University Press. ISBN 0-521-07233-6.
- Hunt, David (1998). "The successors of Constantine". The Cambridge Ancient History. Vol. XIII: the Late Empire AD 337–425. Cambridge: University Press.
- Lenski, Noel (2003). Failure of Empire: Valens and the Roman State in the Fourth Century A.D. Berkeley: University of California Press. ISBN 0-520-23332-8.
- McLynn, Neil B. (1994), Ambrose of Milan: Church and Court in a Christian Capital, The Transformation of the Classical Heritage, vol. 22, Berkeley: University of California Press, ISBN 978-0-520-08461-2
- Williams, Stephen; Friell, Gerard (1994). Theodosius: The Empire at Bay. Yale University Press. ISBN 978-0-300-07447-5.
- Woods, David (2004). "The Constantinian Origin of Justina". The Classical Quarterly: 325–327. doi:10.1093/cq/54.1.325. hdl:10468/28.
