= Constantinian dynasty =

Roman imperial dynasty in Late Antiquity, r. 293–363

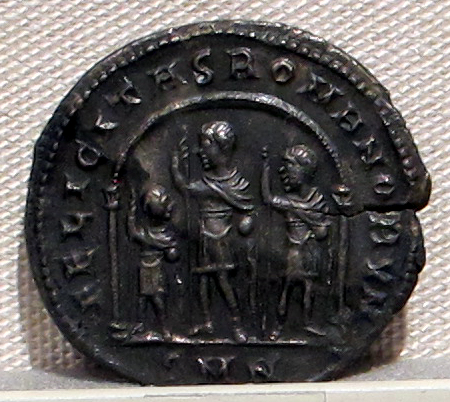
Constantine I with his two eldest sons by Fausta, Constantine II and Constantius II

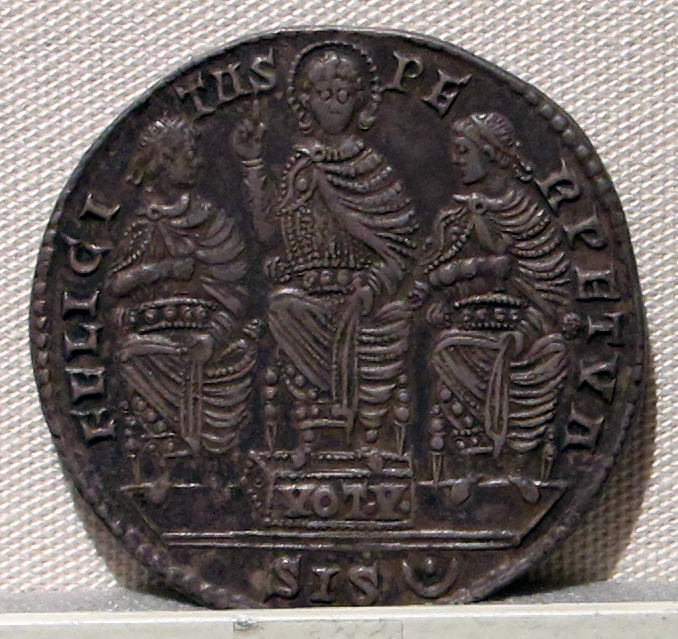
Silver coin of Constans, showing Constans, Constantine II and Constantius II

The Constantinian dynasty is an informal name for the ruling family of the Roman Empire from Constantius Chlorus (died 306) to the death of Julian in 363. It is named after its most famous member, Constantine the Great, who became the sole ruler of the empire in 324. The dynasty is also called Neo-Flavian because every Constantinian emperor bore the name Flavius, similarly to the rulers of the first Flavian dynasty in the 1st century.

== Stemmata ==
In italics the augusti and the augustae.

- Constantius I
  1. From relationship between Constantius I and Helena
    - Constantine I
      1. From marriage between Constantine I and Minervina
        - Crispus
      2. From marriage between Constantine I and Fausta
        - Constantina, wife of Hannibalianus and Constantius Gallus
        - Constantine II
        - Constantius II
          1. No offspring from marriage between Constantius II and his first wife, daughter of Julius Constantius
          2. No offspring from marriage between Constantius II and Eusebia
          3. From marriage between Constantius II and Faustina
            - Constantia, wife of Gratian
        - Constans I
        - Helena, wife of Julian
  2. From marriage between Constantius Chlorus and Theodora
    - Flavius Dalmatius
      1. From marriage between Flavius Dalmatius and unknown wife
        - Flavius Dalmatius
        - Hannibalianus, husband of Constantina
    - Julius Constantius
      1. From marriage between Julius Constantius and Galla
        - son, died in the purges of 337
        - daughter, first wife of Constantius II
        - Constantius Gallus
          1. No offspring from marriage between Gallus and Constantina
      2. From marriage between Julius Constantius and Basilina
        - Julian
          1. No offspring from marriage between Julian and Helena, daughter of Constantine I
    - Hannibalianus (must have died before the imperial purges that occurred in 337 because he is not listed among its victims);
    - Anastasia;
    - Flavia Julia Constantia, wife of Licinius
        - Licinius II
    - Eutropia
        - Nepotianus

== Family tree ==
CONSTANTINIAN DYNASTY detailed family tree

Afranius Hannibalianus	Eutropia	Maximian; Western emperor
Theodora	Constantius I Chlorus; Western emperor 250-305-306	Helena; 250–330	Maxentius; Western emperor
Constantia; 293–330 ∞ Licinius; 250-308-324-325	Flavius Dalmatius censor	1.Galla	Julius Constantius d. 337 ∞ 2.Basilina	Anastasia	Eutropia	Fausta; 289–326	Constantine I the Great; 272-306-337	Minervina
Dalmatius caesar	Hannibalianus	(1) Constantius Gallus	(2) Julian; 331-360-363	Helena d. 360	Constantina ∞ 1.Hannibalianus; 2.Constantius Gallus	Constantius II; 317-337-361 ∞ Faustina	Constantine II; Western emperor 316-337-340	Constans I Western emperor 320-337-350	(daughter) ∞ Justus	Crispus d. 326
Jovian; 331-363-364	Marina Severa	Valentinian I Western emperor VALENTINIANIC DYNASTY	Justina
Constantia; 361–383	Gratian; Western emperor 359-367-383	Galla	Theodosius I Eastern emperor THEODOSIAN DYNASTY

Family of Constantinian dynasty

Emperors are shown with a rounded-corner border with their dates as Augusti, names with a thicker border appear in both sections

1: Constantine's parents and half-siblings

Maximian; 286–305; adoptive father
Helena	Constantius Chlorus; 305–306	Flavia Maximiana Theodora
Constantine I; 306–337	Flavius Dalmatius	Hannibalianus	Flavia Julia Constantia	Licinius; 308–324	Anastasia	Bassianus
Galla	Julius Constantius	Basilina	Licinius II	Eutropia	Virius Nepotianus
Hannibalianus	Constantina	Constantius Gallus	Julian; 360–363	Helena	Nepotianus

2: Constantine's children

Minervina	Constantine I; 306–337	Fausta
Crispus	Constantine II; 337–340	Constans; 337–350	Hannibalianus	Constantina	Constantius Gallus
Faustina	Constantius II; 337–361	Helena	Julian; 360–363
Gratian; 367–383	Constantia

== Relationship to other tetrarchs ==
Other rulers of the tetrarchy were related to the Constantinian dynasty:

- Maximian: adoptive father and father-in-law of Constantius Chlorus, father-in-law of Constantine, grandfather-in-law of Licinius
- Maxentius: adoptive brother and brother-in-law of Constantius Chlorus, brother-in-law of Constantine
- Licinius: son-in-law of Constantius Chlorus, half-brother-in-law of Constantine

== Eastern Roman dynasties that linked themselves to Constantinians ==
- Valentinians (through marriage)
- Theodosians (through marriage)
- Palaiologos
- Komnenos
- Doukas
- Phokas
