= Galla (wife of Julius Constantius) =

First wife of Julius Constantius

- Died: before 332
- Spouse: Julius Constantius
- Issue: Unnamed son Unnamed daughter Gallus
- Dynasty: Constantinian

Galla was the first known wife of Julius Constantius, a member of the Constantinian dynasty.

== Biography ==
Galla was the sister of the consul Neratius Cerealis and of the praetorian prefect Vulcacius Rufinus.

She married Julius Constantius, son of Constantius Chlorus and half-brother of Emperor Constantine I. They had three children: a son, who died with his father in the purges of 337, a daughter, who married her cousin Constantius II, (Note: Her name was probably Galla, Julia or Constantia, the names of her parents.) and finally Constantius Gallus, later Caesar of the East, born around 325. It has been proposed that Galla and Julius had another daughter, who may have been the mother of the empress Justina.

Galla died before her husband, as Gallus was then entrusted to the care of Eusebius, bishop of Nicomedia.

== Bibliography ==
- Martindale, John R.; Jones, A. H. M.; Morris, John, eds. (1971). The Prosopography of the Later Roman Empire: Volume I, AD 260–395. Cambridge: Cambridge University Press. ISBN 0-521-07233-6.
