= Constantine II (emperor) =

Roman emperor from 337 to 340

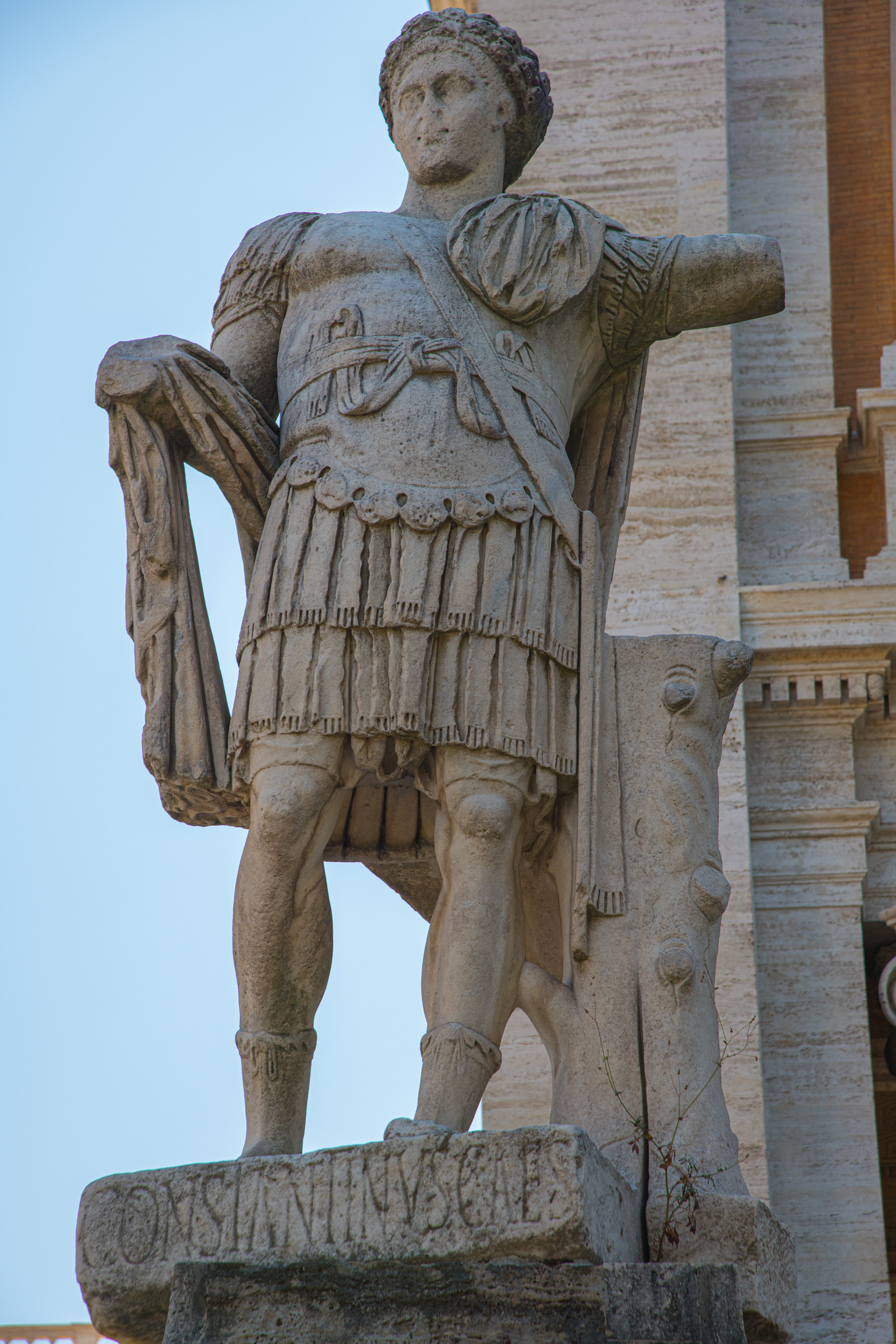
- Statue of Constantine II as caesar, on top of the Cordonata (the monumental staircase climbing up to Piazza del Campidoglio) in Rome

Roman emperor
- Augustus: 9 September 337 – April 340 (Gaul, Hispania, and Britain)
- Predecessor: Constantine I
- Successor: Constans
- Co-emperors: Constantius II (East); Constans (Italy, Illyricum and Africa)
- Caesar: 1 March 317 – 9 September 337
- Born: 316; Arelate, Viennensis
- Died: April 340 (aged 23 or 24); Aquileia, Italy
Names
- Flavius Claudius Constantinus (Note: One belief is that the "Claudius" was added to his name to further strengthen his connection to Claudius Gothicus, his alleged ancestor.)
Regnal name
- Imperator Caesar Flavius Claudius Constantinus Augustus
- Dynasty: Constantinian
- Father: Constantine I
- Mother: Fausta
- Religion: Nicene Christianity

Constantine II (Latin: Flavius Claudius Constantinus; 316–340) was Roman emperor from 337 to 340. He was the second son of Emperor Constantine I and the eldest son of his second wife, Flavia Maxima Fausta. He was proclaimed caesar by his father shortly after his birth. He was associated with military victories over the Sarmatians, Alamanni and Goths during his career, for which he was granted a number of victory titles. He held the consulship four times – in 320, 321, 324, and 329.

Constantine I had arranged for his sons to share power with their cousins Dalmatius and Hannibalianus, but Constantine II and his brothers did not accept this arrangement. As a result, after their father's death Constantine II's brother Constantius II ordered the killings of numerous male relatives, including Dalmatius and Hannibalianus, thus eliminating any possible opponents to the succession of Constantine I's sons. Constantine then ascended to the throne alongside his two younger brothers, ruling Gaul, Hispania, and Britain. However, his belief in his rights of primogeniture and attempts to exert them over his youngest brother, Constans, caused conflict, which ended with his death in a failed invasion of Italy in 340. Constans subsequently took control of Constantine's territories, with the latter being subjected to damnatio memoriae.

== Life ==
Born in Arles in 316, (Note: The only extant outright attestation of Constantine II's birth date states he was born on August 7. This has sometimes been dismissed as a confusion with Constantius II, who was certainly born on the same date, but Barnes commented that the coincidence is possible. He additionally cited Constantine I's documented presence in Constantine II's birthplace in August 316 as support for accepting August 7. Burgess is more skeptical, arguing that evidence of public celebration of Constantine II's birthday would not have survived due to his condemnation of memory.) Constantine II was the second son of the Roman emperor Constantine I, and probably the eldest with his wife Fausta, (Note: Based on the report that Constantine II was proclaimed Caesar only a few days after he was born, The Prosopography of the Later Roman Empire assumed his birth date was in February 317 and, therefore, that he was not Fausta's son, as Constantius II was born less than 9 months later. However, Constantine had already been styled as Caesar on his father's coinage prior to his formal proclamation on 1 March 317, so he cannot have been born as late as February 317. Evidence for Constantine II being Fausta's son includes an inscription outright describing him as such, and Julian calling Fausta the mother of "many emperors.") the daughter of the emperor Maximian.

=== Caesar ===
On 1 March 317, he was made caesar at Serdica. After accompanying his father on his campaign against the Sarmatians in 323, he was commemorated on coinage produced to recognize the ensuing victory. Constantine II usually resided with his father until 328, when his own court was installed at Trier. An inscription dated to 328–330 (Note: Barnes favors the date 330, while Drinkwater prefers an earlier date of 328–9.) records the title of Alamannicus, indicating that his generals won a victory over the Alamanni. His military career continued when Constantine I made him field commander during the 332 winter campaign against the Goths. As a result of his leadership, the military operation concluded with 100,000 Goths reportedly slain and the surrender of the ruler Ariaric. Festival games were initiated in Rome to celebrate the caesar's role in the successful military campaigns, in a public advertisement of his capability to rule. He was married prior to 336, although his wife's identity remains unknown. David Woods has theorized that she may have been a half-cousin, possibly a daughter of Julius Constantius, as Constantine minted coins of his grandfather's second wife Flavia Maximiana Theodora. Another suggestion by Barnes is that she could have been a daughter of Flavius Optatus.

While Constantine I had intended for his sons to rule together with their cousins Dalmatius and Hannibalianus, soon after his death in May 337 the army murdered several of their male relatives, including Dalmatius and Hannibalianus, on the orders of Constantine II's younger brother Constantius II. Although there is no evidence that Constantine himself was directly involved, Burgess observed how he and his brothers had all previously refused to use gold and silver for coins struck in the name of Dalmatius, unlike their father. From this, he concluded that they "not only seem not to have fully accepted the legitimacy of Dalmatius and viewed him as an interloper, but also appear to have communicated with one another on this point and agreed on a common response."

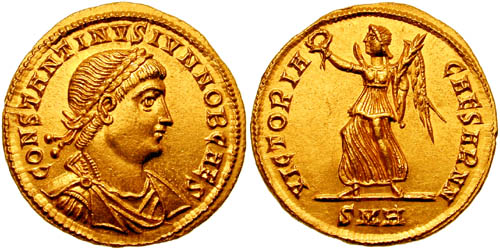
Solidus of Constantine II as caesar

The three brothers then proceeded to print coins of Theodora, whom their murdered relatives were descended from. This action was consistent with the "official version" that the massacre was to be blamed on mutinous soldiers, rather than the victims' own family members. Most of the coins were generated at Constantine II's capital, Trier, indicating that he was the one responsible for designing and producing the coinage at the start, as well as convincing his brothers to do the same. Woods considered it to suggest that he was more sympathetic to Theodora's memory than his brothers, possibly because his wife may have been a granddaughter of Theodora.

In June 337, before he was named emperor, Constantine had already begun attempting to assert his seniority. He issued an order allowing the exiled bishop Athanasius to return to Alexandria, which was under the control of Constantius II, claiming to be carrying out the unfulfilled intentions of his father. While Constantine's motives remain unclear, suggested explanations are that he truly believed in the bishop's innocence, wanted to get rid of a religious nuisance, or intended to cause trouble for Constantius, who would oust Athanasius from Alexandria only two years later.

=== Augustus ===
The three brothers were not named as Augusti until 9 September 337, when they gathered together in Pannonia and divided the Roman territories among themselves. Constantine received Gaul, Britannia and Hispania. Unlike his younger brothers, he gained little from Dalmatius's removal.

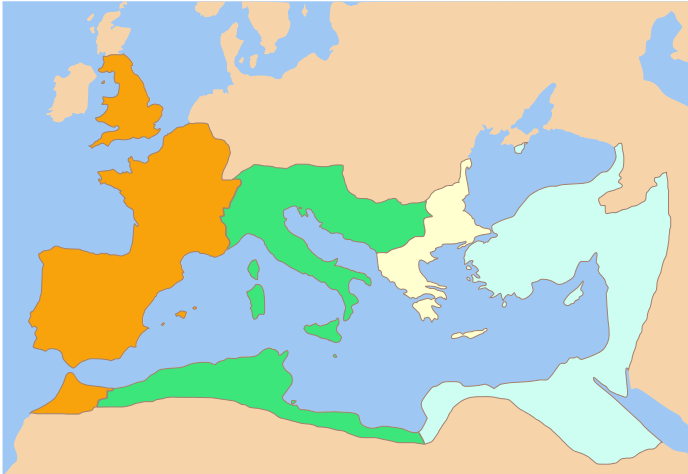
Division of the Empire among the Caesars appointed by Constantine I: from west to east, the territories of Constantine II, Constans, Dalmatius and Constantius II

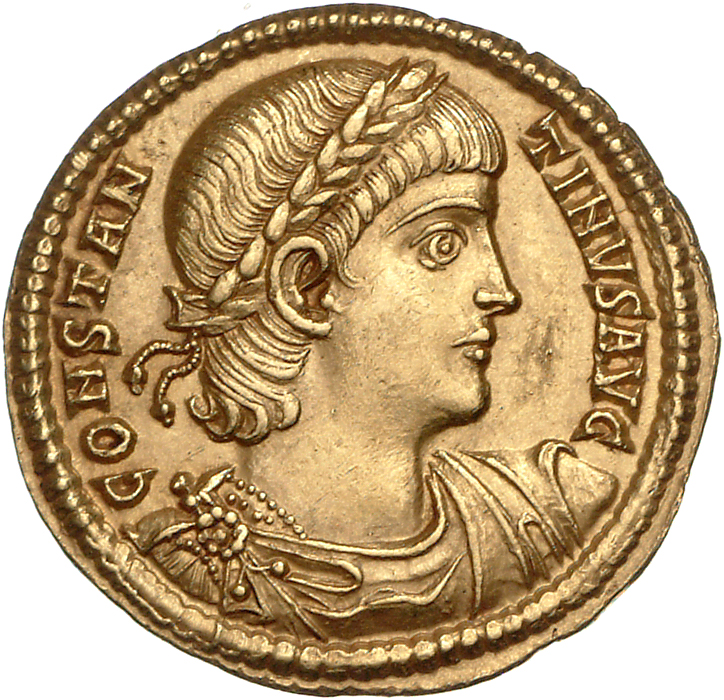
Solidus of Constantine II as augustus

Constantine’s later actions indicate that he was left unsatisfied with the results of their meeting, believing that his age granted him some level of seniority in the imperial college and, by extension, control over the dominion of his youngest brother Constans, who was still a teenager in 337. Even after campaigning successfully against the Alamanni in 338, Constantine continued to maintain his position. The Theodosian Code recorded his legislative intervention in Constans's territory through issuing an edict to the proconsul of Africa in 339.

In April 340, Constantine launched an invasion into Italy to claim territory from Constans. Constans, at that time in Naissus, sent a number of troops to confront him, and Constantine was killed in an ambush near Aquileia. (Note: In a confused account, Zosimus does not say Constantine II invaded his youngest brother's territory. He instead reported that Constans sent troops to Constantine on the pretext of assisting Constantius II in the Persian war, but in reality to assassinate him by surprise. Constans's troops would've been marching away from the Persians if they were heading to Constantine’s territory. Some modern historians, trying to make sense of Zosimus's confusion, have suggested that instead it was Constantine who claimed to be assisting Constantius II.) Constans then took control of his brother's realm, whose inhabitants seem to have been largely unaffected by their change in ruler.

After his death, Constantine was subjected to damnatio memoriae. Constans issued legislation repealing Constantine's acts shortly after his death, where the deceased emperor was branded as "the public enemy and our own enemy." Years later, when Libanius delivered a panegyric for both Constans and Constantius, Constantine was completely omitted from the narrative, as if he had never existed.

== Gallery ==
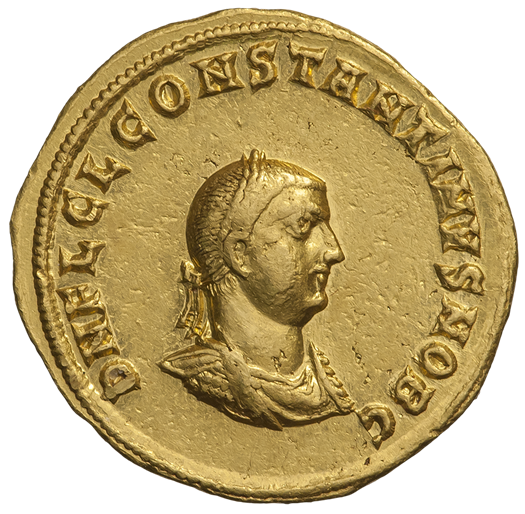
Coin of Constantine II as caesar (aged 1–7), marked: d·n· fl· cl· constantinus nob· c· (Our Lord Flavius Claudius Constantine, Noblest Caesar)

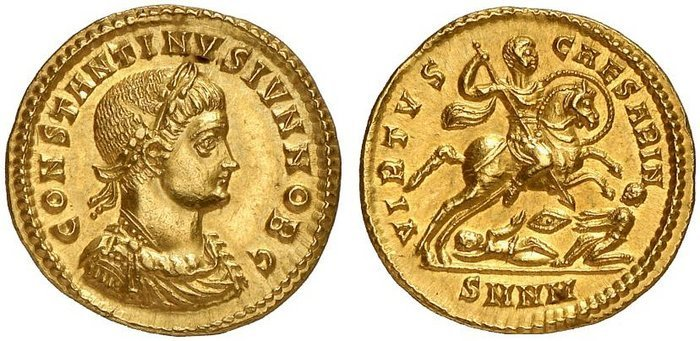
Aureus of Constantine II as caesar (aged 8), marked: constantinus iun· nob· c· ("Constantine Junior, Noblest Caesar") on the obverse

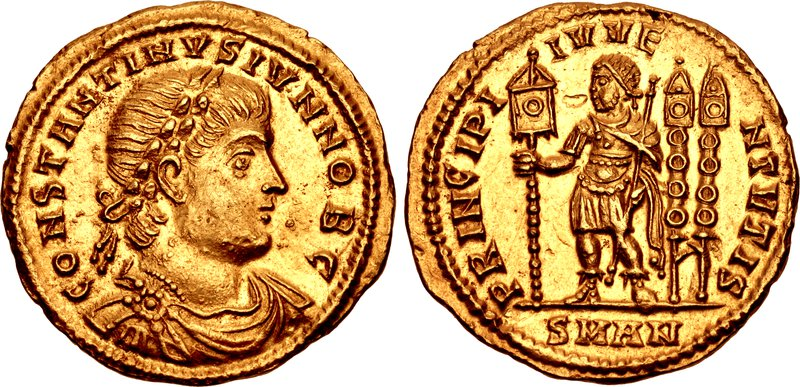
Solidus of Constantine II as caesar (aged 19), marked: constantinus iun· nob· caes· on the obverse ("Constantine Junior, Noblest Caesar") and principi iuventutis (Princeps of youth) on the reverse

== Notes ==
Constantine II (emperor) Constantinian dynasty Born: 316 Died: 340
Regnal titles
Preceded by Constantine I	Roman emperor 337–340; With: Constantius II and Constans	Succeeded by Constantius II; Constans
Political offices
Preceded by Constantine I Licinius Caesar	Roman consul 320–321 with Constantine I , Crispus	Succeeded by Petronius Probianus; Amnius Anicius Julianus
Preceded by Acilius Severus; Vettius Rufinus	Roman consul 324 with Crispus	Succeeded by Sex. Anicius Paulinus; Valerius Proculus
Preceded by Ianuarinus; Vettius Iustus	Roman consul 329 with Constantine I	Succeeded by Gallicanus; Aurelius Valerius Tullianus Symmachus
