= Flavius Optatus =

Flavius Optatus (died September AD 337) was a Roman senator who was appointed consul in AD 334. He was possibly related to the emperor Constantine I.

== Biography ==
Optatus was originally a rhetorician (or as characterised by Libanius, a “teacher of letters”) who was the tutor to Licinius the Younger, the son of the emperor Licinius. Libanius alleged that after the fall of Licinius in AD 324, Optatus owed his continued favour at the imperial court to the influence of his wife, who was willing to bestow her favours in order to help Optatus advance his career.

Optatus was one of the first who was granted the rejuvenated title of Patricius by the emperor Constantine I, perhaps a sign of the change in his social status at the court, or perhaps a recognition of his familial ties with the imperial family. He apparently managed to become quite wealthy through his career at the imperial court, and he was eventually appointed consul prior alongside Amnius Anicius Paulinus in AD 334. Optatus died in AD 337 in the purge of the imperial family and court by the sons of Constantine which saw the deaths of Julius Constantius and Dalmatius.

Optatus had a wife, who was the daughter of an innkeeper from Paphlagonia, and thus may have been a relative of Constantine's mother, Helena. Alternatively, Edward Gibbon wrote that he was married to Constantine's sister Anastasia. Optatus also had two brothers-in-law, one of whom was the father of Saint Optatus.

== Sources ==
- Barnes, Timothy David, Constantine and Eusebius (1981)
- Kelly, Christopher, Bureaucracy and Government in The Cambridge Companion to The Age of Constantine (ed. Lenski, Noel) (2011)
- Martindale, John R.; Jones, A. H. M.; Morris, John, eds. (1971). The Prosopography of the Later Roman Empire: Volume I, AD 260–395. Cambridge: Cambridge University Press. ISBN 0-521-07233-6.

Political offices
Preceded by Flavius Dalmatius; Domitius Zenophilus	Consul of the Roman Empire; 334 with Amnius Manius Caesonius Nicomachus Anicius Paulinus Honorius	Succeeded by Julius Constantius; Gaius Caeionius Rufius Albinus
