= Basilina =

Wife of Julius Constantius and the mother of Roman Emperor Julian

- Born: Asia Minor
- Died: 332/333
- Spouse: Julius Constantius
- Issue: Julian
- Dynasty: Constantinian
- Father: Julius Julianus

Basilina (Greek: Βασιλίνα; died 332/333) was the wife of Julius Constantius and the mother of the Roman emperor Julian (r. 361–363) who in her honour gave the name Basilinopolis to a city in Bithynia (modern Pazarköy near Gemlik, in Turkey).

== Biography ==
Basilina was of Greek descent born in Asia Minor. She was either the daughter of Caeionius Iulianus Camenius, or more likely of Julius Julianus, and received a classical education (i.e., Homer and Hesiod) from Mardonius, a eunuch who grew up in the house of her father. She had a sister who became the mother of Procopius. She was a relative of Bishop Eusebius of Nicomedia, her son's tutor.

She became the second wife of Julius Constantius, whom she gave Julian; Basilina died a few months after childbirth. A Christian, Basilina initially favoured the Arians, but gave her lands as an inheritance to the church of Ephesus.
