= Flavius Dalmatius =

Son of Constantius I

- Born: after 293
- Died: 337
- Issue: Dalmatius; Hannibalianus
- Dynasty: Constantinian
- Father: Constantius I
- Mother: Theodora

Flavius Dalmatius (died 337), also known as Dalmatius the Censor, was a censor (333), and a member of the Constantinian dynasty, which ruled over the Roman Empire at the beginning of the 4th century.

Dalmatius was the son of Constantius Chlorus and Flavia Maximiana Theodora, and thus half-brother of the Emperor Constantine I.

Dalmatius spent his youth in the Gallic Tolosa. It is probable that his two sons, Dalmatius and Hannibalianus, were born here. During the mid-320s, Flavius Dalmatius returned to Constantinople, to the court of his half-brother, and was appointed consul and censor in 333.

In Antioch, Flavius was responsible for the security of the eastern borders of the realm. During this period, he examined the case of bishop Athanasius of Alexandria, an important opponent of Arianism, who was accused of murder. In 334, Flavius suppressed the revolt of Calocaerus, who had proclaimed himself emperor in Cyprus. In the following year he sent some soldiers to the council of Tyros to save the life of Athanasius.

His two sons were appointed to important offices under Constantine's administration, but Flavius Dalmatius and his sons were killed in the purges that followed the Emperor's death in May 337.

== Sources ==
- Martindale, John R.; Jones, A. H. M.; Morris, John, eds. (1971). The Prosopography of the Later Roman Empire: Volume I, AD 260–395. Cambridge: Cambridge University Press. ISBN 0-521-07233-6.

Political offices
Preceded by Lucius Papius Pacatianus, Maecilius Hilarianus	Consul of the Roman Empire; 333 with Domitius Zenophilus	Succeeded by Amnius Anicius Paulinus, Flavius Optatus
