= Anastasia (sister of Constantine I) =

Daughter of Constantius I

- Born: after 293
- Spouse: Bassianus
- Dynasty: Constantinian
- Father: Constantius I
- Mother: Theodora

Anastasia was a daughter of Roman Emperor Constantius Chlorus and Flavia Maximiana Theodora, and half sister of Emperor Constantine I. She was married to a senator, Bassianus, who was found to be plotting against Constantine and executed in the year 316 CE. After Bassianus' death, Anastasia largely disappears from the record, although she later married a senator, Flavius Optatus. The public baths at Constantinople may he been named after her, though this is unclear. The name Anastasia (Koine Greek: Ἀναστασία, romanized: Anastasía, lit. 'resurrection') may indicate a sympathy on her father's part towards Christian culture.
