= List of urban prefects of Rome =

This is a list of urban prefects of Rome, one of the oldest offices of the Roman state, attested from the time of the kings through the Republic and the Empire up until 599. The office also existed during the era of the Crescentii family in Rome, late 10th century, as well as in the early 12th century, when the Pope appointed its holders. It was especially influential during the imperial period and late Antiquity, when the urban prefect exercised the government of the city of Rome and its surrounding territory.

== 6th to 1st century BC ==
- Aulus Sempronius Atratinus (499 BC)
- Quintus Servilius Priscus Structus (465 BC)
- Lucius Papirius Crassus (325 BC)
- Lucius Julius Caesar (47 BC) - appointed by the Magister equitum Mark Antony during his absence from Rome
- Marcus Valerius Messalla Corvinus (26 BC)
- Titus Statilius Taurus (16 BC – AD 14)

== 1st century ==
- Lucius Calpurnius Piso Caesoninus (AD 14 – 32)
- Lucius Aelius Plautius Lamia (32 – 33)
- Cossus Cornelius Lentulus (33 – ?)
- Quintus Sanquinius Maximus (39 – 41)
- Lucius Volusius Saturninus (41 – 56)
- Titus Flavius Sabinus (56 – 60; first term)
- Lucius Pedanius Secundus (60 – 61)
- Titus Flavius Sabinus (62 – 68; second term)
- Aulus Ducenius Geminus (68 – 69)
- Titus Flavius Sabinus (69; third term)
- Tiberius Plautius Silvanus Aelianus (sometime between 69 and 79)
- Lucius Plotius Pegasus (before 78 – 86)
- Marcus Arrecinus Clemens (86 – ?)
- Titus Aurelius Fulvus (sometime between 86 and 96)
- Quintus Julius Cordinus Gaius Rutilius Gallicus (in 91)

== 2nd century ==
- Lucius Julius Ursus Servianus (c. 102)
- Quintus Glitius Atilius Agricola (c.103)
- Sextus Attius Suburanus (c. 104)
- Tiberius Julius Candidus Marius Celsus (c. 105)
- Quintus Baebius Macer (? – 117)
- Marcus Annius Verus (117 – 124)
- Marcus Lollius Paullinus (124 – ?)
- Lucius Catilius Severus (? – 138)
- Servius Cornelius Scipio Salvidienus Orfitus (138 - ?)
- Sextus Erucius Clarus (? – 146) (Note: Clarus died in office at the end of February/beginning of March 146)
- Quintus Lollius Urbicus (146 – 160)
- Quintus Junius Arulenus Rusticus (160 – 167 or 168)
- Lucius Sergius Paullus (167 or 168 – ?)
- Gaius Aufidius Victorinus (179 – 183)
- Publius Seius Fuscianus (187 – 189)
- Publius Helvius Pertinax (189 – 31 December 192)
- Titus Flavius Claudius Sulpicianus (1 January – 28 March 193)
- Cornelius Repentinus (April – June 193)
- (Vibius?) Bassus (Note: This Bassus has been doubtfully identified with Gaius Pomponius Bassus Terentianus) (July 193)
- Gaius Domitius Dexter (late July 193 – 196)
- Publius Cornelius Anullinus (196 – 199)
- Lucius Octavius Cornelius Publius Salvius Julianus Aemilianus (sometime in the 2nd century)

== 3rd century ==
- Lucius Fabius Cilo Septiminus Catinius Acilianus Lepidus Fulcinianus (202/3 – 211)
- Sextus Varius Marcellus (mid/late 211 – December 211)
- Gaius Julius Asper (January 211 – ?)
- Flavius Maternianus (217)
- Marcus Oclatinius Adventus (11 April 217 – mid 217)
- Lucius Marius Maximus Perpetuus Aurelianus (mid 217 – 219) (Note: Tineius Sacerdos possibly was between Aurelianus and Comazon)
- Publius Valerius Comazon (219 – 220; first term)
- Leo (Domitius?) (Procillianus?) (c. 220)
- Publius Valerius Comazon (221; second term)
- Fulvius (? 221 – 222)
- Publius Valerius Comazon (222; third term)
- Severus (attested 223)
- Appius Claudius Julianus (224)
- Marcus Clodius Pupienus Maximus (c. 234 – 237)
- Sabinus (? – 238)
- Gaius Furius Sabinius Aquila Timesitheus (? – 243)
- Flavius Julius Latronianus (between 238 and 244)
- Gaius Julius Aquilius Paternus (sometime in the mid-3rd century)
- Lucius Caesonius Lucillus Macer Rufinianus (c. 246/254)
- Gaius Messius Quintus Decius Valerianus (248)
- Publius Licinius Valerianus (250 – 251)
- Lucius Egnatius Victor Lollianus (254)
- Lucius Valerius Poplicola Balbinus Maximus (255)
- Nummius Ceionius Albinus (256; first term)
- Gaius Junius Donatus (257)
- Publius Cornelius Saecularis (258 – 260)
- Nummius Ceionius Albinus (261 – 263; second term)
- Aspasius Paternus (264 – 266)
- Lucius Petronius Taurus Volusianus (267 – 268)
- Flavius Antiochianus (269 – 270; first term)
- Pomponius Bassus (270 or 271)
- Titus Flavius Postumius Varus (271)
- Flavius Antiochianus (272; second term)
- Virius Orfitus (273 – 274)
- Postumius Suagrus (275)
- Ovinius Pacatianus (276 – 277)
- Virius Lupus (278 – 280)
- Ovinius Paternus (281)
- Pomponius Victorianus (282)
- Titucius Roburrus (283)
- Ceionius Varus (284 – 285)
- Lucius Caesonius Ovinius Manlius Rufinianus Bassus (285)
- Marcus Junius Maximus (286 – 287)
- Pomponius Januarianus (288 – 289)
- Lucius Turranius Gratianus (290 – 291)
- Gaius Junius Tiberianus (291 – 292)
- Claudius Marcellus (292 – 293)
- Septimius Acindynus (293 – 295)
- Titus Claudius Aurelius Aristobulus (295 – 296)
- Cassius Dio (296 – 297)
- Afranius Hannibalianus (297 – 298)
- Lucius Artorius Pius Maximus (298 – 299)
- Anicius Faustus (299 – 300)

== 4th century ==
- Pompeius Appius Faustinus (Mar 300 – 301)
- Lucius Aelius Helvius Dionysius (301 – Feb 302)
- Nummius Tuscus (Feb 302 – Sept 303)
- Junius Tiberianus (Sept 303 – Jan 304)
- Aradius Rufinus (Jan 304 – Feb 305; first term)
- Titus Flavius Postumius Titianus (Feb 305 – Mar 306)
- Gaius Annius Anullinus (Mar 306 – Aug 307)
- Attius Insteius Tertullus (Aug 307 – Apr 308)
- Statius Rufinus (Apr 308 – Oct 309)
- Aurelius Hermogenian (Oct 309 – Oct 310)
- G. Ceionius Rufius Volusianus I (Oct 310 – Oct 311)
- Junius Flavianus (Oct 311 – Feb 312)
- Aradius Rufinus (Feb – Oct 312; second term)
- Gaius Annius Anullinus (Oct – Nov 312; second term)
- Aradius Rufinus (Nov 312 – Dec 313; third term)
- G. Ceionius Rufius Volusianus II (Dec 313 – Aug 315)
- Gaius Vettius Cossinius Rufinus (Aug 315 – Aug 316)
- Ovinius Gallicanus (Aug 316 – May 317)
- Septimius Bassus (May 317 – Sept 319)
- Valerius Maximus Basilius (Sept 319 – Sept 323)
- Locrius Verinus (Sept 323 – Jan 325)
- Acilius Severus (Jan 325 – Nov 326)
- Amnius Anicius Julianus (Nov 326 – Sept 329)
- Publilius Optatianus Porphyrius (Sept – Oct 329; first term)
- Petronius Probianus (Oct 329 – Apr 331)
- Sex. Anicius Paulinus (Apr 331 – Apr 333)
- Publilius Optatianus Porphyrius (Apr – May 333; second term)
- Marcus Ceionius Julianus (May 333 – Apr 334)
- Amnius Anicius Paulinus (Apr 334 – Dec 335)
- Ceionius Rufius Albinus (Dec 335 – Mar 337)
- L. Aradius Valerius Proculus I (Mar 337 – Jan 338)
- Mecilius Hilarianus (Jan 338 – Jul 339)
- Lucius Turcius Apronianus (Jul – Oct 339)
- Fabius Titianus I (Oct 339 – Feb 341; first term)
- Aurelius Celsinus I (Feb 341 – Apr 342; first term)
- Q. Flavius Maesius Egnatius Lollianus (Apr – Jul 342)
- Aconius Catullinus Philomatius (Jul 342 – Apr 344)
- Quintus Rusticus (Apr 344 – Jul 345)
- Petronius Probinus (Jul 345 – Dec 346)
- M. Furius Placidus (Dec 346 – Jun 347)
- Ulpius Limenius (Jun 347 – Apr 349)
- Hermogenes (May 349 – Feb 350)
- Fabius Titianus II (Feb 350 – Mar 351)
- Aurelius Celsinus II (Mar – May 351)
- Caelius Probatus (May – Jun 351)
- Clodius Celsinus Adelphius (Jun – Dec 351)
- L. Aradius Valerius Proculus II (Dec 351 – Sept 352)
- Septimius Mnasea (Sept 352)
- Neratius Cerealis (Sept 352 – Dec 353)
- Memmius Vitrasius Orfitus I (Dec 353 – Jul 355)
- Flavius Leontius (Jul 355 (or after) – Nov 356)
- Memmius Vitrasius Orfitus II (Jan 357 – Mar 359)
- Junius Bassus Theotecnius (359)
- Tertullus (359 – autumn 361)
- Maximus (autumn 361 – Jan 362)
- Lucius Turcius Apronianus Asterius (Dec 362 – early 364)
- Lucius Aurelius Avianius Symmachus (Apr 364 – Mar 365)
- Gaius Ceionius Rufius Volusianus Lampadius (Apr – Sept 365)
- Viventius (Oct 365 – May 367)
- Vettius Agorius Praetextatus (Aug 367 – Sept 368)
- Quintus Clodius Hermogenianus Olybrius (Jan 369 – Aug 370)
- Publius Ampelius (Jan 371 – Jul 372)
- Bappo (late 372 – 372/373)
- Principius (373)
- Flavius Eupraxius (374)
- Claudius Hermogenianus Caesarius (374)
- Tanaucius Isfalangius (372/375)
- Tarracius Bassus (after 374)
- Aradius Rufinus (376)
- Gracchus (376–377)
- Gabinius Vettius Probianus (377)
- Martinianus (378)
- Flavius Hypatius (379)
- Magnus Arborius (380)
- Anicius Paulinus (380)
- Lucius Valerius Septimius Bassus (379/383)
- Valerianus (381)
- Afranius Syagrius (381)
- Valerius Severus (382)
- Anicius Auchenius Bassus (382–383)
- Aventius (383–384)
- Quintus Aurelius Symmachus (summer 384 – Jan/Feb 385)
- Pinianus (Feb 385 – Feb 387)
- Sallustius (387)
- Sextius Rusticus Julianus (387/388)
- Sextus Aurelius Victor (c. 389)
- Ceionius Rufius Albinus (Jun 389 – Feb 391)
- Faltonius Probus Alypius (391)
- Flavius Philippus (391)
- Basilius (395)
- Andromachus (395)
- Florentinus (395 – 397)
- Lampadius (Jan – Mar 398)
- Felix (Mar 398)
- Nicomachus Flavianus (399–400; first term)

== 5th century ==
- Protadius (400 - 401)
- Flavius Macrobius Longinianus (401 - 402)
- Caecina Decius Albinus (402)
- Postumius Lampadius (403 - 406; second term)
- Flavius Pisidius Romulus (406)
- Senator (407)
- Hilarius (408)
- Nicomachus Flavianus (408; second term)
- Gabinius Barbarus Pompeianus (408 - 409)
- Priscus Attalus (409)
- Marcianus (409 - 410)
- Bonosianus (410 - 411)
- Palmatus (412)
- Flavius Annius Eucharius Epiphanius (412 - 414)
- Rutilius Claudius Namatianus (414)
- Caecina Decius Acinatius Albinus (414)
- Gracchus (415)
- Probianus (416)
- Rufius Antonius Agrypnius Volusianus (417 - 418)
- Aurelius Anicius Symmachus (418 - 420)
- Petronius Maximus (420 - 421; first term)
- Flavius Albinus (426)
- Petronius Maximus (sometime between 421 and 439; second term)
- Flavius Paulus (438)
- Pierius (440)
- Fonteius Litorius Auxentius (441; first term)
- Storacius (443)
- Honoratus (sometime between 443 and 449)
- Fonteius Litorius Auxentius (445; second term)
- Auxiliaris (445)
- Flavius Eurycles Epityncanus (450)
- Valerius Faltonius Adelphius (451; third term)
- Memmius Aemilius Trygetius (452)
- Aemilianus (458)
- Gaius Sollius Modestus Apollinaris Sidonius (468 - 469)
- Messius Phoebus Severus (470)
- Flavius Eugenius Asellus (470 - 471)
- Publius Valerius Rufinus (471 - 472)
- Castalius Innocentius Audax (474 - 475)
- Anicius Acilius Aginantius Faustus (sometime between 475 and 482)
- Decius Marius Venantius Basilius (484)
- Quintus Aurelius Memmius Symmachus (485)
- Caecina Mavortius Basilius Decius (486)
- Flavius Nar. Manlius Boethius (487, for the second time)
- Rufius Achilius Sividius (488; second term)
- Claudius Julius Eclesius Dynamius (488)

=== Of uncertain date in the 5th century ===
- Claudius Lachanius (late 4th or early 5th century)
- Junius Pomponius Ammonius (4th or 5th century)
- Junius Valerius Bellicus (sometime between 408 and 423)
- Anicius Acilius Glabrio Faustus (three terms between 408 and 437)
- Euthymius (early or mid 5th century)
- Julius Agrius Tarrutenius Marcianus (early or mid 5th century)
- Flavius Peregrinus Saturninus (two terms in the early or mid 5th century)
- Paulinus (sometime between 425 and 455)
- Flavius Olbius Auxentius Draucus (sometime between 425 and 450)
- Neuthius (sometime between 426 and 443)
- Rufius Caecina Felix Lampadius (sometime between 429 and 450)
- Appius Nicomachus Dexter (before 432)
- Petronius Perpenna Magnus Quadratinus (before 443)
- Rufius Praetextatus Postumianus (two terms before 448)
- Flavius Rufius Opilio (after 450)
- Valerius Faltonius Adelphius (two terms before 451)
- Rufius Viventius Gallus (mid 5th century)
- Junius Valentinus (sometime between 455 and 476)
- Probinus (sometime between 457 and 472)
- Plotius Eustathius (sometime between 457 and 472)
- Flavius Synesius Gennadius Paulus (before 467)
- Aggerius (before 483)
- Venantius Severinus Faustus (before 483)
- Glabrio Venantius Faustus (before 483)
- Rufius Synesius Hadirianus (before 483)
- Rufius Valerius Messala (before 483)
- Fabius Felix Passifilius Paulinus (before 483)
- Titus Haditanus Secundus (before 483)
- Memmius Aemilius Trygetius (before 483)
- Flavius Nar. Manlius Boethius (before 487; first time) (487; second time) (he served as consul in 487)
- Rufius Achilius Sividius (before 488; first term) (488; second term) (he served as consul in 488)
- Claudius Iulius Ecclesius Dynamius (circa 488) (he served as consul in 488)
- Flavius Turcius Rufius Apronianus Asterius (before 494) (he served as consul in 494)

== 6th century ==
- Anicius Acilius Aginantius Faustus (502 - 503) (he had served as consul in 483)
- Constantius (506 - 507)
- Flavius Agapitus (508 - 509) (he served as consul in 517)
- Artemiodorus (509 - 510)
- Argolicus (510 - 511)
- Eusebius (523 - 524)
- Reparatus (527)
- Salventius (533)
- Honorius (535/536) (Note: "Instructed by Theodahad to repair the bronze elephants on the Via Sacra; he had reported to the king on their bad condition")
- Gregorius Anicius ?(573) (he was pope from 590 until his death in 604)

=== Of uncertain date in the 6th century ===
- Catulinus (late 5th or early 6th century)
- Bacauda (5th or 6th century)
- Julius Felix Campanianus (5th or 6th century)
- Justinianus (5th or 6th century)
- Valerius Florianus (sometime between 491 and 518)

== Sources ==
- Broughton, T. Robert S. (1951), The Magistrates of the Roman Republic - Volume I, 509 BC – 100BC, The American Philological Association, ISBN 978-0-891-30706-8
- Broughton, T. Robert S. (1952), The Magistrates of the Roman Republic - Volume II, 99 BC – 31BC, The American Philological Association, ISBN 978-0-891-30812-6
- Martindale, John R., ed. (1980). The Prosopography of the Later Roman Empire: Volume II, AD 395–527. Cambridge: Cambridge University Press. ISBN 0-521-20159-4.
- Martindale, John R., ed. (1992). The Prosopography of the Later Roman Empire: Volume III, AD 527–641. Cambridge: Cambridge University Press. ISBN 0-521-20160-8.
