= List of Roman governors of Africa =

Rome appointed governors of Africa from its conquest of Carthage in 146 BC until the province was lost to the Vandals in AD 439. The extent of 'Africa' varied time to time, but area/province encompassing and surrounding Carthage as a representative city of this region was always considered 'Africa' in a narrow sense.

== 146–100 BC ==
Unless otherwise noted, names of governors in Africa and their dates are taken from T.R.S. Broughton, The Magistrates of the Roman Republic, (New York: American Philological Association, 1951, 1986), vol. 1, and vol. 2 (1952).

Inscriptional evidence is less common for this period than for the Imperial era, and names of those who held a provincia are usually recorded by historians only during wartime or by the Fasti Triumphales. After the defeat of Carthage in 146 BC, no further assignments to Africa among the senior magistrates or promagistrates are recorded until the Jugurthine War (112–105 BC), when the command against Jugurtha in Numidia became a consular province.

- P. Cornelius Scipio Africanus Aemilianus (146 BC)
- uncertain 146/45–112/11
- L. Calpurnius Bestia (111 BC)
- Sp. Postumius Albinus (110–109 BC) (Note: Continued as proconsul until the arrival of Metellus in 109 BC.)
- Q. Caecilius Metellus Numidicus (109–107 BC) (Note: Continued as proconsul until the arrival of his successor Marius, whom he declined to meet for the transfer of command. He triumphed over Numidia in 106 and received his cognomen Numidicus at that time.)
- C. Marius (107–105 BC)
- L. Cornelius Sulla (105 BC) (Note: Delegated command pro praetore when Marius returned to Rome.)
- uncertain 105–100/90s

== 90s–31 BC ==
During the civil wars of the 80s and 40s BC, legitimate governors are difficult to distinguish from purely military commands, as rival factions were vying for control of the province by means of force.

- None known with reasonable certainty for the 90s BC
- L. Marcius Phylippus (96—95 BC)
- P. Sextilius (88–87 BC)
- Q. Caecilius Metellus Pius (86–84 BC)
- C. Fabius Hadrianus (84–82 BC)
- Gn. Pompeius Magnus (82–79 BC)
- uncertain 79-77
- L. Licinius Lucullus (77–76/75 BC)
- uncertain 76/75–70/69
- A. Manlius Torquatus (69 BC or earlier)
- uncertain 69–67
- L. Sergius Catilina (67–66 BC)
- uncertain 66–62
- Q. Pompeius Rufus (62–60/59 BC)
- T. Vettius, cognomen possibly Sabinus (58–57 BC)
- Q. Valerius Orca (56 BC)
- uncertain 56–53/52
- P. Attius Varus (52 BC and probably earlier; see also below)
- C. Considius Longus (51–50 BC)
- L. Aelius Tubero (49 BC; may never have assumed the post)
- P. Attius Varus (seized control again in 49 and held Africa until 48)
- Q. Caecilius Metellus Pius Scipio Nasica (47 BC)
- M. Porcius Cato (jointly in 47 BC with special charge of Utica)
- C. Caninius Rebilus (46 BC)
- C. Calvisius Sabinus (45–early 44 BC, Africa Vetus)
- C. Sallustius Crispus, the historian usually known in English as Sallust (45 BC, Africa Nova)
- Q. Cornificius (44–42 BC, Africa Vetus)
- T. Sextius (44–40 BC, Africa Nova)
- C. Fuficius Fango (41 BC)
- M. Aemilius Lepidus (40–36 BC)
- T. Statilius Taurus (35 BC)
- L. Cornificius (34–32 BC)
- uncertain 32–31

== Reign of Augustus ==
- uncertain 31–29
- Lucius Autronius Paetus (29/28 BC)
- uncertain 28–25
- Marcus Acilius Glabrio (25 BC)
- uncertain 24–c. 21
- Lucius Sempronius Atratinus (?c. 21/20 BC)
- Lucius Cornelius Balbus (20/19 BC)
- uncertain 19–14
- Gaius Sentius Saturninus (14/13 BC)
- Lucius Domitius Ahenobarbus (13/12 BC)
- uncertain 12–9/8
- Publius Quinctilius Varus (8/7 BC)
- Lucius Volusius Saturninus (7/6 BC)
- Africanus Fabius Maximus (6/5 BC)
- uncertain 4 BC – c. AD 4
- Gnaeus Calpurnius Piso (3 BC?)
- Lucius Cornelius Lentulus (c. AD 4)
- Lucius Passienus Rufus approx (c. AD 4/5)
- Cossus Cornelius Lentulus Gaetulicus (c. AD 5/6)
- uncertain c. 6 – c. 8
- Lucius Caninius Gallus (c. AD 8)
- uncertain c. 8–14
- Lucius Nonius Asprenas (14–15)

== 1st century AD ==
- Lucius Aelius Lamia (15/16)
- uncertain 16–17
- Marcus Furius Camillus (17/18)
- Lucius Apronius (18–21)
- Quintus Junius Blaesus (21–23)
- Publius Cornelius Dolabella (23/24)
- uncertain 24–26
- Gaius Vibius Marsus (26–29)
- Marcus Junius Silanus (29–35)
- Gaius Rubellius Blandus (35/36)
- Servius Cornelius Cethegus (36/37)
- Lucius Calpurnius Piso (38/39)
- Lucius Salvius Otho (40/41)
- Quintus Marcius Barea Soranus (41–43)
- Servius Sulpicius Galba (44–46)
- Marcus Servilius Nonianus (46/47)
- Titus Statilius Taurus (52/53)
- Marcus Pompeius Silvanus Staberius Flavianus (53–56)
- Quintus Sulpicius Camerinus Peticus (56/57)
- Gnaeus Hosidius Geta (57/58)
- Quintus Curtius Rufus (58/59)
- Aulus Vitellius (60/61)
- Lucius Vitellius (61/62)
- Servius Cornelius Scipio Salvidienus Orfitus (62/63)
- Titus Flavius Vespasianus (63/64)
- Gaius Vipstanus Apronianus (68)
- Lucius Calpurnius Piso (69/70) (Note: Unless otherwise stated, the names of the proconsular governors from 69 to 139 are taken from Werner Eck, "Jahres- und Provinzialfasten der senatorischen Statthalter von 69/70 bis 138/139", Chiron, 12 (1982), pp. 281–362; 13 (1983), pp. 147–237)
- Lucius Junius Quintus Vibius Crispus (71/72)
- Quintus Manlius Ancharius Tarquitius Saturninus (72/73)
- Quintus Julius Cordinus Gaius Rutilius Gallicus (74)
- Gaius Paccius Africanus (77/78)
- Publius Galerius Trachalus (78/79)
- Lucius Nonius Calpurnius Torquatus Asprenas (82/83)
- Sextus Vettulenus Cerialis (83/84)
- Gnaeus Domitius Lucanus (84/85)
- Gnaeus Domitius Tullus (85/86)
- Lucius Funisulanus Vettonianus (91/92)
- Asprenas (92/93)
- Marius Priscus (97/98)
- Gaius Cornelius Gallicanus (98/99)

== 2nd century (101–200) ==
- Gaius Octavius Tidius Tossianus Lucius Javolenus Priscus (101/102)
- Lucius Cornelius Pusio Annius Messala (103/104)
- Quintus Peducaeus Priscinus (106/107)
- Gaius Cornelius Rarus Sextius Naso (108/109)
- Quintus Pomponius Rufus (110/111)
- Gaius Pomponius Rufus Acilius Priscus Coelius Sparsus (112/113)
- Aulus Caecilius Faustinus (115/116)
- Gaius Julius Cornutus Tertullus (116/117)
- Lucius Roscius Aelianus Maecius Celer (117/118)
- Marcus Vitorius Marcellus (120/121)
- Lucius Minicius Natalis (121/122)
- Marcus Atilius Metilius Bradua (uncertain; 122/123)
- Lucius Catilius Severus Julianus Claudius Reginus (124/125)
- Lucius Stertinius Noricus (127/128)
- Marcus Pompeius Macrinus Neos Theophanes (130/131)
- Tiberius Julius Secundus (131/132)
- Gaius Ummidius Quadratus Sertorius Severus (133/134)
- Gaius Bruttius Praesens Lucius Fulvius Rusticus (134/135)
- [...]catus P. Valerius Priscus (136/137)
- Lucius Vitrasius Flamininus (137/138)
- Titus Salvius Rufinus Minicius Opimianus (138/139)
- Titus Prifernius Paetus Rosianus Geminus (140–141) (Note: Unless otherwise stated, the names of the proconsular governors from 139 to 180 are taken from Géza Alföldy, Konsulat und Senatorenstand unter der Antoninen (Bonn: Rudolf Habelt Verlag, 1977), pp. 207–211)
- ? Sextus Julius Major (c. 141–142)
- Publius Tullius Varro (142–143)
- Lucius Minicius Natalis Quadronius Verus (153–154)
- (? Ennius) Proculus (156–157)
- Lucius Hedius Rufus Lollianus Avitus (157–158)
- Claudius Maximus (c. 158–159)
- Quintus Egrilius Plarianus (c. 159)
- Titus Prifernius Paetus Rosianus Geminus (c. 160–161)
- Quintus Voconius Saxa Fidus (161–162)
- Sextus Cocceius Severianus (c. 162–163)
- Servius Cornelius Scipio Salvidienus Orfitus (164)
- Manius Acilius Glabrio Gnaeus Cornelius Severus (c. 166–167)
- Publius Salvius Julianus (167–168)
- Titus Sextius Lateranus (168/169)
- Gaius Serius Augurinus (169–170)
- Strabo Aemilius (c. 172)
- Gaius Aufidius Victorinus (c. 173–174)
- Gaius Septimius Severus (174–175)
- Publius Julius Scapula Tertullus (178–179 or 179–180)
- Publius Vigellius Saturninus (c. 180)
- P. Vigellius Raius Plarius Saturninus Atilius Braduanus Caucidius Tertullus (180/181) (Note: Unless otherwise stated, the names of the proconsular governors from 180 to 217 are taken from Paul M. M. Leunissen, Konsuln und Konsulare in der Zeit von Commodus bis Severus Alexander (Amsterdam: J.C. Gieben, 1989) pp. 213–220)
- Marcus Antonius Zeno (183/184 or 184/185)
- Publius Helvius Pertinax (? 188/189)
- Marcus Didius Julianus (? 189/190)
- Pollienus Auspex (between 185 and 190)
- Gaius Vettius Sabinianus Julius Hospes (? 190/191)
- L. Vespronius Candidus Sallustius Sabinianus (? 191/192)
- Publius Cornelius Anullinus (192/193)
- Cingius Severus (? 196/197)
- Lucius Cossonius Eggius Marullus (198/199)

== 3rd century (201–300) ==
- Gaius Julius Asper (200/201 or 204/205)
- Marcus Umbrius Primus (c. 201/2)
- Minicius Opimianus (c. 202)
- (P. Aelius ?) Hilarianus (c.203)
- Rufinus (203/204)
- Marcus Valerius Bradua Mauricus (c. 205)
- Titus Flavius Decimus (208/209 or 209/210)
- Marcus Ulpius Domitius Aristaeus Arabianus (210/211)
- Gaius Valerius Pudens (211/212)
- Scapula (212/213)
- L. Marius Maximus Perpetuus Aurelianus (213-215 or 214–216)
- C. Caesonius Macer Rufinianus (between 212 and 215)
- [...]mus (216/217)
- Sextus Cocceius Vibianus (Under Septimius Severus or, less likely, under Caracalla)
- Appius Claudius Julianus (Between 212 and 220)
- Gaius Caesonius Macer Rufinianus (Between 213 and 215)
- Marius Maximus (Between 213 and 217)
- Lucius Marius Perpetuus (c. 220)
- Cassius Dio (c. 221)
- Gaius Octavius Appius Suetrius Sabinus (c. 230)
- Marcus Antonius Gordianus Sempronianus Romanus Africanus (237)
- Sabinianus (240)
- Lucius Caesonius Lucillus Macer Rufinianus (c. 240)
- Aspasius Paternus (257–258)
- Galerius Maximus (258–259)
- Lucius Messius [...] (Between 259 and 261)
- ? Vibius Passienus (Between 260 and 268)
- Lucius Naevius Aquilinus (Between 260 and 268)
- Sextus Cocceius Anicius Faustus (Between 265 and 268)
- Firmus (278)
- Lucius Caesonius Ovinius Manlius Rufinianus Bassus (c. 275)
- Gaius Julius Paulinus (283)
- Titus Claudius Aurelius Aristobulus (290–294)
- Cassius Dio (294–295)
- Titus Flavius Postumius Titianus (295–296)
- Lucius Aelius Helvius Dionysius (296–300)

== 4th century (301–400) ==
- Iulianus, possibly Amnius Anicius Julianus (301–302)
- Gaius Annius Anullinus (302–305)
- Gaius Ceionius Rufius Volusianus (305–306)
- Petronius Probianus (315–317)
- Aconius Catullinus (317–318)
- Cezeus Largus Maternianus (333–336) (Note: Unless otherwise stated, the names of the proconsular governors from 333 to 392 are taken from the list in Barnes, T.D. (1985). "Proconsuls of Africa, 337–392". Phoenix. 39 (2): 144–153. doi:10.2307/1088824. JSTOR 1088824.)
- Quintus Flavius Maesius Egnatius Lollianus (336–337)
- Antonius Marcellinus (337–338)
- Aurelius Celsinus (338–339)
- Aconius Catullinus Philomatius (vicarius, 338–339).
- Proculus (340–341)
- [...]lius Flavianus (357–358)
- Sextus Claudius Petronius Probus (358–359)
- Proclianus (359–361)
- Quintus Clodius Hermogenianus Olybrius (361–362)
- Clodius Octavianus (363–364)
- Publius Ampelius (364–365)
- ? Claudius Hermogenianus Caesarius (365–366)
- Julius Festus Hymetius (366–368)
- Petronius Claudius (368–371)
- Sextius Rusticus Julianus (371–373)
- Quintus Aurelius Symmachus (373–374)
- Paulus Constantius (374–375)
- Chilo (375–376)
- Decimius Hilarianus Hesperius (April 376 – October 377)
- Thalassius (October 377 – April 379)
- Afranius Syagrius (379–380)
- Helvius Vindicianus (380–381; possibly 382–383)
- Herasius (381–382)
- Virius Audentius Aemilianus (382–383; possibly 381–382)
- Flavius Eusignius (383–384)
- Messianus (385–386)
- Felix Juniorinus Polemius (388–389)
- Latinius Pacatus Drepanius (389–390)
- Flavius Rhodinus Primus (391–392)
- Aemilius Florus Paternus (392–393) (Note: Unless otherwise stated, the names of the proconsular governors from 392 to 414 are taken from the list Barnes, T.D. (1983). "Late Roman Prosopography: Between Theodosius and Justinian". Phoenix. 37 (3): 248–270. doi:10.2307/1088953. JSTOR 1088953.)
- Flaccianus (393–393)
- Marcianus (394)
- Flavius Herodes (394–395)
- Ennodius (attested 16 May / 26 Dec. 395) (Note: "Ennoius" in the Codex Theodosianus and "Ennodius" in the Code of Justinian. Barnes says the latter is preferable.)
- Theodorus (attested 26 December 396)
- Anicius Probinus (attested 17 March 397)
- Seranus (c. 397–398)
- Victorinus (attested May 399)
- Apollodorus (attested 20 Aug. 399 / 14 Mar. 400)
- Gabinius Barbarus Pompeianus (attested 31 May 400 – 28 Mar. 401)

== 5th century ==
- ? Helpidius (401–402)
- Septiminus (att. 20 Feb. – 13 Sep. 403)
- ? Rufius Antonius Agrypnius Volusianus (404–405)
- Flavius Pionius Diotimus (att. 5 Mar. – 8 Dec. 405)
- Gaius Aelius Pompeius Porfyrius Proculus (att. 15 Nov. 407 – 5 Jun. 408)
- Donatus (att. 11–24 Nov. 408)
- Macrobius Palladius (409–410)
- Apringius (att. late 411)
- Eucharius (att. 29 Feb. – 8 Aug. 412)
- Quintus Sentius Fabricius Julianus (att. 15 Oct. 412 – 30 Aug. 414)
- Aurelius Anicius Symmachus (att. 28 Aug. 415)

== See also ==
- Lists of ancient Roman governors
