= Rufia gens =

Ancient Roman family

The gens Rufia, occasionally spelled Ruffia, was a minor plebeian family at ancient Rome. Members of this gens are not mentioned in history until imperial times, and they achieved little prominence until the late third century, from which time the family rose in importance, gaining the consulship on a number of occasions from the time of Constantine the Great to that of Justinian, and frequently holding the post of praefectus urbi.

== Origin ==
The nomen Rufius is derived from the common Latin surname Rufus, red, originally given to someone with red hair. It is frequently confounded with Rufrius, presumably from the related ruber, reddish or ruddy. Chase classifies Rufius among those gentilicia that either originated at Rome, or cannot be shown to have come from anywhere else.

== Branches and cognomina ==
The Rufii used a variety of personal cognomina, which was typical of Roman nomenclature in imperial times. The only distinct family name seems to have been Festus, joyous or festive, which appears among the Rufii for several centuries. The nomen Ceionius suggests that some of the Rufii were probably descended from the Ceionii, and acquired the nomen Rufius through a female line, although this is uncertain given the variability of Roman nomenclature under the Empire, in which nomina could be rearranged for political reasons, to emphasize family connections. (Note: The same uncertainty affects a number of the late Rufii, who may or not have been members of the Rufia gens, but who are included here because of their nomina, which indicate at least descent from the Rufii.) Avienus, which appears multiple times among the Rufii from the fourth to the sixth century, was probably acquired in this way; it was the nomen of an obscure plebeian family, while another of the family bore Postumius, the nomen of one of Rome's great patrician houses; it occurs twice more among the Rufii a century later, once in the derivative form Postumianus, although whether the latter were descended from the earlier Postumius is unknown. Volusianus, derived from the ancient gens Volusia, was also passed down for several generations.

== Members ==
This list includes abbreviated praenomina. For an explanation of this practice, see filiation.

- Rufius Crispinus, or Rufrius Crispinus, an eques who rose to the rank of praetorian prefect under Claudius, and was rewarded with the quaestorian insignia for apprehending Decimus Valerius Asiaticus in AD 47. Agrippina had him removed from his office in 52, and he was sent into exile in 66, as the former husband of the empress Poppaea Sabina. Sentenced to death, he took his own life.
- Rufius or Rufrius Crispinus, son of the praetorian prefect, was put to death by Nero.
- Lucius Rufius Clarus Gallus, patron of one of the artisanal colleges at Ostia.
- Rufia C. f. Aquilina, a woman from a senatorial family.
- Ruffia Marcella, a woman from a senatorial family, was the wife of Sabinianus.

=== Rufii Festi ===
- Gaius Rufius C. f. Festus, procurator of Dalmatia and Histria in uncertain years. He was the father of Gaius Rufius Festus Laelius Firmus and Rufia Procula.
- Gaius Rufius C. f. C. n. Festus Laelius Firmus, a man of senatorial rank, was the son of Gaius Rufius Festus, the procurator.
- Rufia C. f. C. n. Procula, a woman of a senatorial family, was the daughter of the procurator Rufius Festus.
- Postumius Rufius Festus signo Avienius, a fourth-century poet who wrote on geography, and wrote paraphrases of Livy and Vergil, whose style he followed.
- (Rufius?) Festus, consul in 439 AD.
- Rufius Postumius Festus, consul in AD 472, was the last consul appointed by an emperor of the West. He later became embroiled in papal politics, and in the early sixth century allied himself with Quintus Aurelius Memmius Symmachus.

=== Rufii Volusiani et Albini ===
- Gaius Ceionius Rufius Volusianus, a man of senatorial rank, was corrector of Italy from about AD 282 to 290, governor of Africa from 305 to 306, and subsequently praetorian prefect and praefectus urbi. He was consul in 311 and 314, but his enemies brought him into disfavour, and he was exiled in 315.
- Ceionius Rufius C. f. Albinus, consul in AD 335, and subsequently praefectus urbi, was a philosopher and possibly the author of a history of Rome, now lost.
- Gaius Ceionius Rufius Volusianus signo Lampadius, praetorian prefect of Gaul in AD 355, and praefectus urbi of Rome in 365.
- Ceionius Rufius C. f. Albinus, praefectus urbi from AD 389 to 391.
- Ceionius Rufius C. f. Volusianus, vicar of Asia before 390.
- Rufius Antonius Agrypnius Volusianus, praefectus urbi from AD 417 to 418, Rufius had previously been proconsul of Africa, and would later serve as praetorian prefect of Italy. He was a leading voice in Rome's surviving pagan minority, and was a correspondent of Saint Augustine. According to the Life of Saint Melania, his niece convinced him to convert to Christianity on his deathbed in 437.

=== Others ===
- Rufius Festus, the author of Breviarium Rerum Gestarum Populi Romani, an abridgement of Roman history based on Eutropius and Florus. The work is dedicated to the emperor Valens, and must have been written about AD 369. He may be the same person as the poet Rufius Festus Avienus.
- Sextus Rufius Festus, perhaps the correct name of the author of De Regionibus Urbis Romanae, a work on the geography of the city of Rome, and a history under the title of Breviarium de Victoriis and Provinciis Populi Romani, dedicated to Valens. He may be identical with Rufius Festus, the author of Breviarium Rerum Gestarum Populi Romani, and Rufius Festus Avienus, the poet and writer on geography.
- Rufius Probianus, a vicarius, or deputy governor, of an uncertain province circa AD 400.
- Rufius Caecina Felix Lampadius, praefectus urbi of Rome under Valentinian III and Theodosius II, made major repairs to the Colosseum following an earthquake.
- Rufius Praetextatus Postumianus, twice praefectus urbi, was consul in AD 448.
- Rufius Viventius Gallus, brother of Postumianus, was praefectus urbi at some point in the mid fifth century.
- Rufius Opilio, presumably identical with either Opilio, consul in 453, or Venantius Opilio, consul in 524.
- Rufius Achilius Maecius Placidus, consul in AD 481.
- Rufius Achilius Sividius, quaestor and praefectus urbi, was appointed consul by Odoacer in AD 488.
- Turcius Rufius Apronianus Asterius, praefectus urbi, and consul in AD 494. He edited a text of Vergil's Codex Mediceus, and married Vigilia, the daughter of Reparatus, and niece of Pope Vigilius. According to the Liber Pontificalis, enemies of the pope had him arrested during the night, and beaten to death.
- Rufius Turcius Apronianus, a vir clarissimus named in an undated seat in the Colosseum.
- Rufius Magnus Faustus Avienus, consul in AD 502, and later praetorian prefect of Italy.
- Rufius Petronius Nicomachus Cethegus, consul in AD 504. He was a leading voice in the Roman senate, of which he was president when Rome was sacked by Totila in 546. Rufius fled to Constantinople, where he was received with honour by Justinian.
- Rufius Gennadius Probus Orestes, consul in AD 530, was among a number of ex-consuls and other nobiles taken prisoner by Totila in 546. He was freed by a Byzantine patrol the following year, but due to a lack of available horses could not be evacuated, and was subsequently taken prisoner by the Goths, who put him to death in 552, as the general Narses recaptured the city of Rome.

== See also ==
- List of Roman gentes

== Bibliography ==
- Lucius Annaeus Seneca (Seneca the Younger), Octavia (attributed).
- Publius Cornelius Tacitus, Annales.
- Lucius Mestrius Plutarchus (Plutarch), Lives of the Noble Greeks and Romans.
- Gaius Suetonius Tranquillus, De Vita Caesarum (Lives of the Caesars, or The Twelve Caesars).
- Augustine of Hippo, Epistulae (Letters).
- Gerontius, Vita Sanctae Melaniae Junioris (The Life of Saint Melania the Younger).
- Procopius Caesariensis, De Bellis (The Wars of Justinian).
- Magnus Aurelius Cassiodorus, Variae Epistolae (Letters of Theodoric the Great).
- Dictionary of Greek and Roman Biography and Mythology, William Smith, ed., Little, Brown and Company, Boston (1849).
- Theodor Mommsen et alii, Corpus Inscriptionum Latinarum (The Body of Latin Inscriptions, abbreviated CIL), Berlin-Brandenburgische Akademie der Wissenschaften (1853–present).
- George Davis Chase, "The Origin of Roman Praenomina", in Harvard Studies in Classical Philology, vol. VIII, pp. 103–184 (1897).
- Harper's Dictionary of Classical Literature and Antiquities, Harry Thurston Peck, ed. (Second Edition, 1897).
- Paul von Rohden, Elimar Klebs, & Hermann Dessau, Prosopographia Imperii Romani (The Prosopography of the Roman Empire, abbreviated PIR), Berlin (1898).
- John Matthews, "Continuity in a Roman Family; The Rufii Festi of Volsinii", Historia: Zeitschrift für Alte Geschichte, vol. 16, no. 4 (1967), pp. 484–509, JSTOR 4435006.
- Jones, A.H.M.; J.R. Martindale & J. Morris (1971–1992). Prosopography of the Later Roman Empire. Cambridge University Press. ISBN 0-521-07233-6.
- L. D. Reynolds (ed.), Texts and Transmission: A Survey of the Latin Classics, Oxford, Clarendon Press (1983).
- Peter Brown, "Church and Leadership" in A History of Private Life: From Pagan Rome to Byzantium, Paul Veyne, ed. (1987).
- Liber Pontificalis (The Book of the Popes), ed. Raymond Davis, Liverpool University Press (1989).
- Olli Salomies, Adoptive and Polyonymous Nomenclature in the Roman Empire, Societas Scientiarum Fennica, Helsinki (1992).
- John C. Traupman, The New College Latin & English Dictionary, Bantam Books, New York (1995).
- Barnes, T.D. (1975). "Two Senators under Constantine". The Journal of Roman Studies. 65: 40–49. doi:10.2307/370062. JSTOR 370062. S2CID 163755638.
- Cameron, Alan (1985). "Polyonomy in the Late Roman Aristocracy: the Case of Petronius Probus". The Journal of Roman Studies. 75: 164–182. doi:10.2307/300658. JSTOR 300658. S2CID 162744598.
- Cameron, Alan (1995). "Avienus or Avienius?". Zeitschrift für Papyrologie und Epigraphik. 108: 252–262. JSTOR 20189613.
