= Caeionius =

Caeionius is a given name. Notable people with the name include:

- (Marcus) Caeionius Proculus (250 or 255 – after 289), a suffect consul in 289
- Gaius Caeionius Rufius Albinus (290 – after 339), a Consul of Rome in 335, praefectus urbi of Rome in 335–337
- Gaius Caeionius Rufius Volusianus (255 – after 321), a Consul of Rome in February, 311 and March, 314, etc.
- Marcus Caeionius Silvanus (120 or 125 – after 156), a Consul of Rome in 156
