= Publilius Optatianus Porfyrius =

Publilius Optatianus Porfyrius (fl. 4th century) was a Latin poet, possibly a native of Africa. Porfyrius has been identified with Publilius Optatianus, who was praefectus urbi in 329 and 333. For some reason he had been banished, but having addressed a panegyric to the Emperor Constantine I, he was allowed to return.

== Works ==
Twenty-eight poems are extant under his name, of which twenty were included in the panegyric. The technically complex form of the poems can be regarded as a specimen of "perverted ingenuity". Some of them are squares (the number of letters in each line being equal), certain letters being rubricated so as to form a pattern or figure, and at the same time special verses or maxims. Others represent various objects (a syrinx, an organ, an altar). Others have special peculiarities in each line (number of words or letters) while the eighth poem (the versus anacyclici) may be read backwards without any effect upon sense or metre. A complimentary letter from the emperor and letter of thanks from the author are also extant.

The manuscript tradition attributes to Optatianus an extensive, but uneven, body of work, which includes poems written at various times and using different techniques. Despite the presence of poems composed well before his fall from grace, the central core of the work is still made up of the panegyric sent to Constantine in the hope of obtaining forgiveness.

The central theme of the Panegyricus is the emperor, but with infrequent references to contemporary historical facts.

The main feature of the poems, however, lies not so much in their content, as in the technique with which they are made. Optatianus was the first author known to write versus intexti (literally "twisted verses"), a special form of picture poem.

The picture poem is that in which the lines are arranged so as to form a precise stylized drawing (an altar, a bagpipe ...). This compositional technique, used by influential poets such as Theocritus, had come to Rome between the second and first centuries BC, with the Erotopaegnia of Laevius. Optatianus's novel use of this technique involved constructing an acrostic, so that within the composition, by a specified path, arises a second or third text relating to the first.

The composition of such a poem was done in phases:

- the sheet (and not the roll of papyrus) was first divided into squares;
- inside the squares were inserted letters of the verses that followed different paths;
- completing the previous verses, the rest of the page was filled by placing letters in the boxes that, together with those already present, formed sensible verses.

The technique used by Optatianus reveals his predilection for difficulties and technical virtuosity, as the compositions of the Panegyrics become even more complicated, for example, with the construction of verses in the form of palindromes (as in the poem XXVIII) or verses metrically identical when read from right to left.

Optatianus was inspired by Lucan and Silius Italicus, but especially by Ovid, who is the main touchstone for the author, especially because of their mutual experience of exile.

For example, in poem VIII the versus intexti form the "Chi Rho" monogram of Christ, and the name "Iesus" (Jesus). The X (Chi) is made up of the two lines Alme, salutari nunc haec tibi pagina signo, Scripta micat, resonans nominibus domini ("Dear, this page with a salutary watchword is for you, what is written shines, echoing the names of the Lord"). The letters which compose the name of Jesus and the central P (Rho) form the lines Nate deo, solus salvator, sanctae bonorum, tu deus es justi, gratia tu fidei ("Son of God, the only savior, of the holy woman of the good, you are the god of the righteous, you are the grace of faith") and sit victor comes Aug et natis eius ("He shall be a triumphant companion to Aug and his children").

	A	C	C	I	P	E	P	I	C	T	A	N	O	V	I	S	E	L	E	G	I	S	L	V	X	A	V	R	E	A	M	V	N	D	I
	C	L	E	M	E	N	T	I	S	P	I	A	S	I	G	N	A	D	E	I	V	O	T	V	M	Q	V	E	P	E	R	E	N	N	E
	S	V	M	M	E	F	A	V	E	T	E	T	O	T	A	R	O	G	A	T	P	L	E	B	S	G	A	V	D	I	A	R	I	T	E
	E	T	M	E	R	I	T	A	M	C	R	E	D	I	T	C	V	M	S	E	R	V	A	T	I	V	S	S	A	T	I	M	O	R	E
5	A	V	G	V	S	T	O	E	T	F	I	D	E	I	C	H	R	I	S	T	I	S	V	B	L	E	G	E	P	R	O	B	A	T	A
	G	L	O	R	I	A	I	A	M	S	A	E	C	L	O	P	R	O	C	E	S	S	I	T	C	A	N	D	I	D	A	M	I	T	I
	A	D	C	V	M	V	L	A	N	S	C	O	E	T	V	S	E	T	T	O	T	A	O	R	N	A	T	A	S	E	R	E	N	I	S
	M	V	N	E	R	I	B	V	S	P	R	A	E	S	T	A	N	S	N	A	T	I	S	V	T	L	A	V	R	E	A	V	O	T	A
	V	I	R	T	V	T	V	M	T	I	T	V	L	O	S	P	R	I	M	I	S	I	A	M	D	E	B	E	A	T	A	N	N	I	S
10	P	R	O	G	E	N	I	E	T	A	L	I	G	E	N	V	I	T	Q	V	O	S	N	O	B	I	L	E	S	A	E	C	L	V	M
	H	I	S	D	E	C	V	S	A	P	R	O	A	V	O	E	T	V	E	R	A	E	C	O	N	S	C	I	A	P	R	O	L	I	S
	R	O	M	A	C	L	V	I	T	P	R	I	N	C	E	P	S	I	N	V	I	C	T	I	M	I	L	I	T	I	S	A	L	M	A
	O	T	I	A	P	A	C	I	S	A	M	A	N	S	H	A	E	C	S	V	N	T	M	I	T	I	S	S	I	M	A	D	O	N	A
	H	O	C	A	T	A	V	I	M	E	R	I	T	V	M	V	O	T	I	S	P	O	S	T	E	D	I	T	V	S	O	R	B	I	S
15	E	R	V	M	P	E	N	S	D	O	C	V	I	T	N	E	N	O	R	I	N	T	F	R	A	N	G	E	R	E	F	I	D	E	I
	O	P	T	I	M	A	I	V	R	A	P	A	R	E	S	C	V	R	I	S	S	V	B	M	A	R	T	I	S	I	N	I	Q	U	I
	N	V	L	L	I	S	L	A	E	S	A	F	I	D	E	S	H	I	N	C	I	V	G	I	S	T	A	M	I	N	E	F	A	T	A
	V	O	B	I	S	F	I	L	A	L	E	G	V	N	T	P	L	A	C	I	D	A	P	I	E	T	A	T	E	S	E	C	V	T	A
	E	T	R	E	S	C	O	N	S	T	A	N	T	I	N	V	N	C	E	X	E	R	I	T	I	N	C	L	I	T	A	F	A	M	A
20	A	V	C	T	A	S	T	I	R	P	E	P	I	A	V	O	T	O	A	C	C	V	M	V	L	A	T	A	P	E	R	E	N	N	I
	S	A	N	C	T	A	S	V	A	S	S	E	D	E	S	A	D	M	E	N	T	I	S	G	A	V	D	I	A	M	I	G	R	A	T
	A	E	T	H	E	R	I	O	R	E	S	I	D	E	N	S	F	E	L	I	X	I	N	C	A	R	D	I	N	E	M	U	N	D	I
	I	A	M	P	A	T	R	I	A	E	V	I	R	T	V	T	I	S	O	P	V	S	B	E	L	L	I	N	E	L	A	B	O	R	E
	A	N	I	V	S	T	I	M	E	R	I	T	I	S	D	I	C	A	M	M	E	N	T	I	S	Q	V	E	S	E	R	E	N	A	E
25	E	T	P	I	A	D	O	N	A	C	A	N	A	M	F	E	C	V	N	D	A	Q	V	E	P	E	C	T	O	R	A	N	O	T	O
	R	I	T	E	D	E	O	S	I	C	M	E	N	T	E	V	I	G	E	N	T	C	V	I	G	A	V	D	I	A	C	A	S	T	A
	C	L	A	V	D	I	V	S	I	N	V	I	C	T	V	S	B	E	L	L	I	S	I	N	S	I	G	N	I	A	M	A	G	N	A
	V	I	R	T	V	T	V	M	T	V	L	E	R	I	T	G	O	T	H	I	C	O	D	E	M	I	L	I	T	E	P	A	R	T	A
	E	T	P	I	E	T	A	T	E	P	O	T	E	N	S	C	O	N	S	T	A	N	T	I	V	S	O	M	N	I	A	P	A	C	E
30	A	C	I	V	S	T	I	S	A	V	C	T	V	S	C	O	M	P	L	E	R	I	T	S	A	E	C	V	L	A	D	O	N	I	S
	H	A	E	C	P	O	T	I	O	R	E	F	I	D	E	M	E	R	I	T	I	S	M	A	I	O	R	I	B	V	S	O	R	T	A
	O	R	B	I	D	O	N	A	T	V	O	P	R	A	E	S	T	A	S	S	V	P	E	R	A	S	Q	V	E	P	R	I	O	R	A
	P	E	R	Q	V	E	T	V	O	S	N	A	T	O	S	V	I	N	C	I	S	P	R	A	E	C	O	N	I	A	M	A	G	N	A
	A	C	T	I	B	I	L	E	G	E	D	E	I	I	V	S	S	I	S	Q	V	E	P	E	R	E	N	N	I	A	F	I	E	N	T
35	S	A	E	C	L	A	P	I	I	S	C	E	P	T	R	I	T	E	C	O	N	S	T	A	N	T	I	N	E	S	E	R	E	N	O

Political offices
Preceded by Amnius Anicius Julianus	Prefect of Rome; 329	Succeeded by Petronius Probianus
Preceded by Sex. Anicius Paulinus	Prefect of Rome II; 333	Succeeded by M. Ceionius Julianus
