= Paulinus =

Paulinus or Paullinus may refer to:

== Christian saints ==
- Paulinus of Antioch
- Paulinus of Nola, poet and bishop
- Paulinus of York, first bishop of York
- Paulinus II of Aquileia, Italian bishop, poet and scholar
- Paulinus of Wales
- Paulinus of Trier, 4th-century bishop

== Other people ==
- Paulinus (consul 498)
- Paulinus (follower of Plotinus)
- Paulinus II of Antioch
- Paulinus the Deacon, 5th-century biographer of Ambrose
- Paulinus of Venice (died 1344), Franciscan historian
- Paulinus Costa, Roman Catholic Archbishop of the archdiocese of Dhaka

== People with the name ==
- Gaius Suetonius Paulinus, general who defeated Boudica
- Sextus Anicius Paulinus, consul in 325
- Amnius Anicius Paulinus, consul in 334
- Decius Paulinus, consul of the Western Roman Empire in 534
- Paul Aurelian or Paulinus Aurelianus

=== Fictional ===
- Paulinus Maximus, main character of Eagle in the Snow
- Aulus Paulinus, Roman Governor of Britain in Chelmsford 123
- Paulinus "Paul" Taylor, character in The Blob
