= Aurelius Celsinus =

Aurelius Celsinus (floruit 341–351) was a politician of the Roman Empire.

== Life ==
He was related to the Symmachi. He might have been the son of Aurelius Valerius Tullianus Symmachus and the brother of Lucius Aurelius Avianius Symmachus, father of the famous Quintus Aurelius Symmachus.

Between February 341 and April 342, Celsinus was praefectus urbi of Rome, under Emperor Constans.

In 351, when the usurper Magnentius ruled over the Western half of the Roman Empire, but had already been defeated by Emperor Constantius II in the battle of Mursa Major, Celsinus accepted to hold for the second time the urban prefecture, from March to May,

During his first term, Celsinus erected in the Circus Maximus a statue in honour of the Emperor Constans; later, the name of the Emperor was erased, when Magnentius ordered the damnatio memoriae against Constans. The base of the statue has been found between the Circus Maximus and the Arch of Titus.

== Bibliography ==
- Sogno, Cristiana, Q. Aurelius Symmachus: A Political Biography, University of Michigan Press, 2006, ISBN 0-472-11529-4, p. 102.
- Curran, John R., Pagan City and Christian Capital: Rome in the Fourth Century, Oxford University Press, 2000, ISBN 0-19-815278-7, pp. 234–235.

Political offices
Preceded by Fabius Titianus (I)	Praefectus urbi of Rome; 27 February 341-1 April 342	Succeeded by Quintus Flavius Maesius Egnatius Lollianus
Preceded by Fabius Titianus (II)	Praefectus urbi of Rome; 1 March-12 May 351	Succeeded by Caelius Probatus
