= Pope Boniface I =

Head of the Catholic Church from 418 to 422

Pope Saint Boniface I
- Bishop of Rome
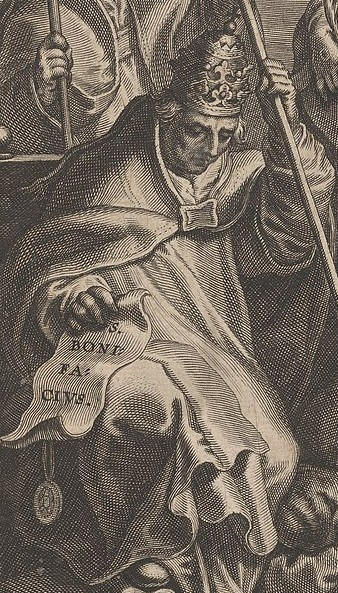
- Engraving by Cornelis Galle the Elder, c. 1640
- Church: Catholic Church
- Papacy began: 29 December 418
- Papacy ended: 4 September 422
- Predecessor: Zosimus
- Successor: Celestine I

Personal details
- Born: Rome, Italy, Roman Empire
- Died: 4 September 422 Rome, Italy, Western Roman Empire
- Spouse: name unknown

Sainthood
- Feast day: 25 October
- Venerated in: Catholic Church, Eastern Orthodox Church, Oriental Orthodoxy

Pope Boniface I (Latin: Bonifatius I; 4 September 422) was the bishop of Rome from 28 December 418 to his death on 4 September 422. His election was disputed by the supporters of Eulalius until the dispute was settled by Emperor Honorius. Boniface was active in maintaining church discipline, and he restored certain privileges to the metropolitical sees of Narbonne and Vienne, exempting them from any subjection to the primacy of Arles. He was a contemporary of Augustine of Hippo, who dedicated to him some of his works.

== Early life ==
Little is known of his life antecedent to his election. He was married and his wife died before he became pope. The Liber Pontificalis calls him a Roman and the son of the presbyter Iocundus or Jocundus. He is believed to have been ordained by Pope Damasus I (366–384) and to have served as representative of Innocent I at Constantinople (c. 405).

== Election ==
On the day of Pope Zosimus's funeral, which was held at San Lorenzo fuori le Mura, partisans of Eulalius occupied the Lateran. Later that day, Eulalius arrived, with a crowd consisting of deacons, laity, and a few priests, and was elected bishop. The new pope and his supporters remained at the church until Sunday, 29 December, for the formal ordination customarily took place on a Sunday.

Meanwhile, on the Saturday after the funeral, and of Eulalius' election, a majority of the priests of the Church elected Boniface, who had previously been a councilor of Pope Innocent. He also was consecrated on 29 December, at the Church of Saint Marcellus in the Campus Martius.

The Urban Prefect Aurelius Anicius Symmachus warned both parties to keep the peace and wrote to the Emperor Honorius that Eulalius, who had been elected first and in due order, was in the right. The Emperor answered on 3 January 419, recognizing Eulalius as the rightful bishop of Rome. Despite these official acts, violence broke out between the two groups of supporters, and Boniface was seized by the Prefect's police and taken to a lodging outside the walls where he was detained under the surveillance of the Prefect's agents.

However, Boniface's partisans did not let the matter rest there and sent a petition to Emperor Honorius alleging irregularities in the election of Eulalius. In response, the Emperor suspended his previous order and summoned both parties to appear for judgment before him and certain Italian bishops on 8 February. This hearing then deferred the decision to a synod scheduled to meet at Spoleto on 13 June, but commanded both Boniface and Eulalius to stay out of Rome. Since Easter was approaching, the bishop of Spoleto, an outside party, was asked to celebrate the rites of this important holy day in Rome.

Both Empress Galla Placidia and her husband Constantius III favored Eulalius, who had been elected first. And Stewart Oost observes that papal elections at the time were "still quite indefinite and both parties could thus with right claim proper election and consecration." Although Eulalius appeared to be destined to be confirmed to the post, he defied Honorius' order and entered Rome on 18 March — Easter Sunday that year fell on 30 March — thus losing the support of the authorities.

Symmachus sent his police to occupy the Lateran, where Eulalius had established himself, and removed him to a house outside the walls of Rome. Bishop Achilleus of Spoleto celebrated the Mass in the Lateran. The proposed Council of Spoleto was canceled, and on 3 April 419, Emperor Honorius recognized Boniface as the rightful pope.

== Pontificate ==
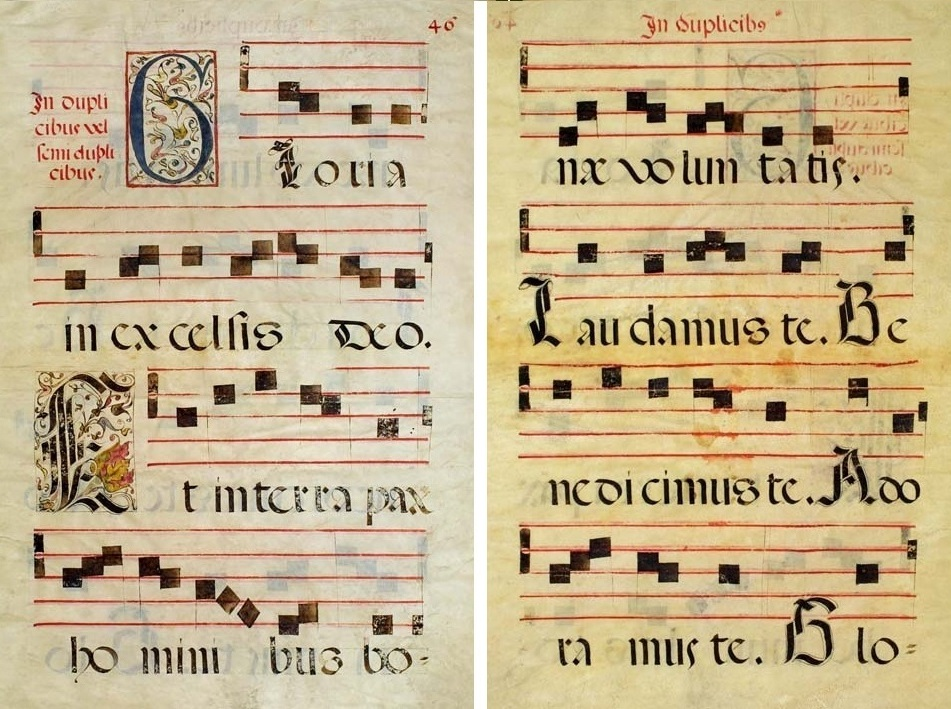
Boniface I ordered that Gloria in excelsis Deo be sung on Maundy Thursday (16th century sheet music)

Boniface ordered the singing of the Gloria in excelsis on Maundy Thursday, and regulated several points of Church discipline. He reversed some of his predecessor's policies regarding church administration. He reduced the vicariate authority giving Patroclus, Bishop of Arles, jurisdiction over other Gallic sees and restored the metropolitan powers of the chief bishops of provinces. He supported Hilary, Archbishop of Narbonne, in his choice of a bishop of the vacant See of Lodève, against Patroclus, who tried to install someone else. He also insisted that Maximus, Bishop of Valence, should be tried for his alleged crimes, not by a primate, but by a synod of the bishops of Gaul, and promised to sustain their decision.

Boniface supported Augustine in combating Pelagianism, forwarding to him two Pelagian letters Boniface had received calumniating Augustine. In recognition of this solicitude, Augustine dedicated to Boniface his rejoinder contained in Contra duas Epistolas Pelagianorum Libri quatuor. He persuaded Emperor Theodosius II to return Illyricum to Western jurisdiction and defended the rights of the Holy See.

Boniface I died 4 September 422, in Rome.

== See also ==
- List of popes
- Pope Saint Boniface I, patron saint archive

Titles of the Great Christian Church
Preceded by Zosimus	Pope; 418–422	Succeeded by Celestine I
