= Antipope Eulalius =

Antipope

- Elected: 26 December 418
- Papacy began: 29 December 418
- Papacy ended: 3 April 419
- Predecessor: Roman claimant: Zosimus; Antipapal claimant: Ursicinus
- Successor: Roman claimant: Boniface I Antipapal claimant: Laurentius
- Opposed to: Pope Boniface I
- Other post: Bishop of Napete

Orders
- Consecration: 29 December 418

Personal details
- Died: 423

Antipope Eulalius (died 423) was antipope from December 418 to April 419. Elected in a dual election with Pope Boniface I, he eventually lost out to Boniface and became bishop of Napete.

== History ==
Upon the death of Pope Zosimus on December 26, 418, the Urban prefect, Aurelius Anicius Symmachus, directed the people to proceed to a new election without disturbance. On the day of the funeral, partisans of the archdeacon Eulalius occupied the Lateran. Later that day, Eulalius arrived there with a crowd consisting of deacons, laity, and a few priests, and was elected pope. The new pope and his supporters remained at the church until Sunday, 29 December, for the ordination customarily took place on a Sunday.

Meanwhile, on Saturday after Eulalius had been elected, a majority of the priests of the church elected Boniface, who had previously been a councilor of Pope Innocent, and he too was consecrated on 29 December, at the Church of Saint Marcellus in the Campus Martius.

Prefect Symmachus warned both parties to keep the peace and, on December 29, wrote to the Emperor Honorius that Eulalius, who had been elected first and in due order, was in the right. The Emperor answered on 3 January 419, recognizing Eulalius as the rightful bishop of Rome. and ordering Boniface to be expelled from the city, and the troublemakers punished. Symmachus ordered the supporters of Boniface not to hold a planned procession, but they beat the messenger and held the procession nonetheless. They then attempted to forcibly enter the city, but had been driven out by an opposing mob. All this happened while Eulalius was celebrating the Epiphany mass at St. Peter's. Boniface and his supporters remained at St. Paul's-outside-the-Walls.

But Boniface's supporters refused to concede defeat, and petitioned the Emperor, claiming irregularities in the election. In response, Honorius suspended his previous order on 15 January, and summoned both parties to appear before him, along with other Italian bishops, on 8 February. At that hearing, a final judgment was deferred to a second synod that would meet at Spoleto on 13 June. Honorius sent private letters to several of the more important prelates, e.g. Paulinus of Nola, Augustine, and Aurelius of Carthage, and circular letters to the bishops of Africa and Gaul. All parties had been ordered to stay out of Rome, with the Easter services to be conducted by Achilleus, Bishop of Spoleto.

Despite this reversal, Eulalius's position appeared to be the stronger, for he had the support of the Empress Galla Placidia and her husband Constantius, because he had been elected first. However, Stewart Oost believes this very strength led Eulalius to overconfidence. He returned to Rome 18 March to celebrate Easter Sunday, but this flouting of the Emperor's orders lost him the support of these two powerful individuals; the inhabitants of Rome rioted, and the prefect Symmachus had his guard occupy the Lateran, where Eulalius had made his base, and escort Eulalius out of the city to a house and kept under guard. On 3 April, the Emperor officially recognized Boniface as the rightful Pope.

Eulalius subsequently became bishop of Napete. According to the Liber Pontificalis, Eulalius was deposed by a synod of 52 bishops and sent to Campania (a statement rejected by Baronius as inconsistent with contemporary documents); then, when Boniface died in 422, the people and clergy of Rome petitioned him to be the new Pope, but Eulalius refused their offer. The same source states he died one year later.

== See also ==
- Papal selection before 1059
