= Rufius Antonius Agrypnius Volusianus =

Roman aristocrat and statesman

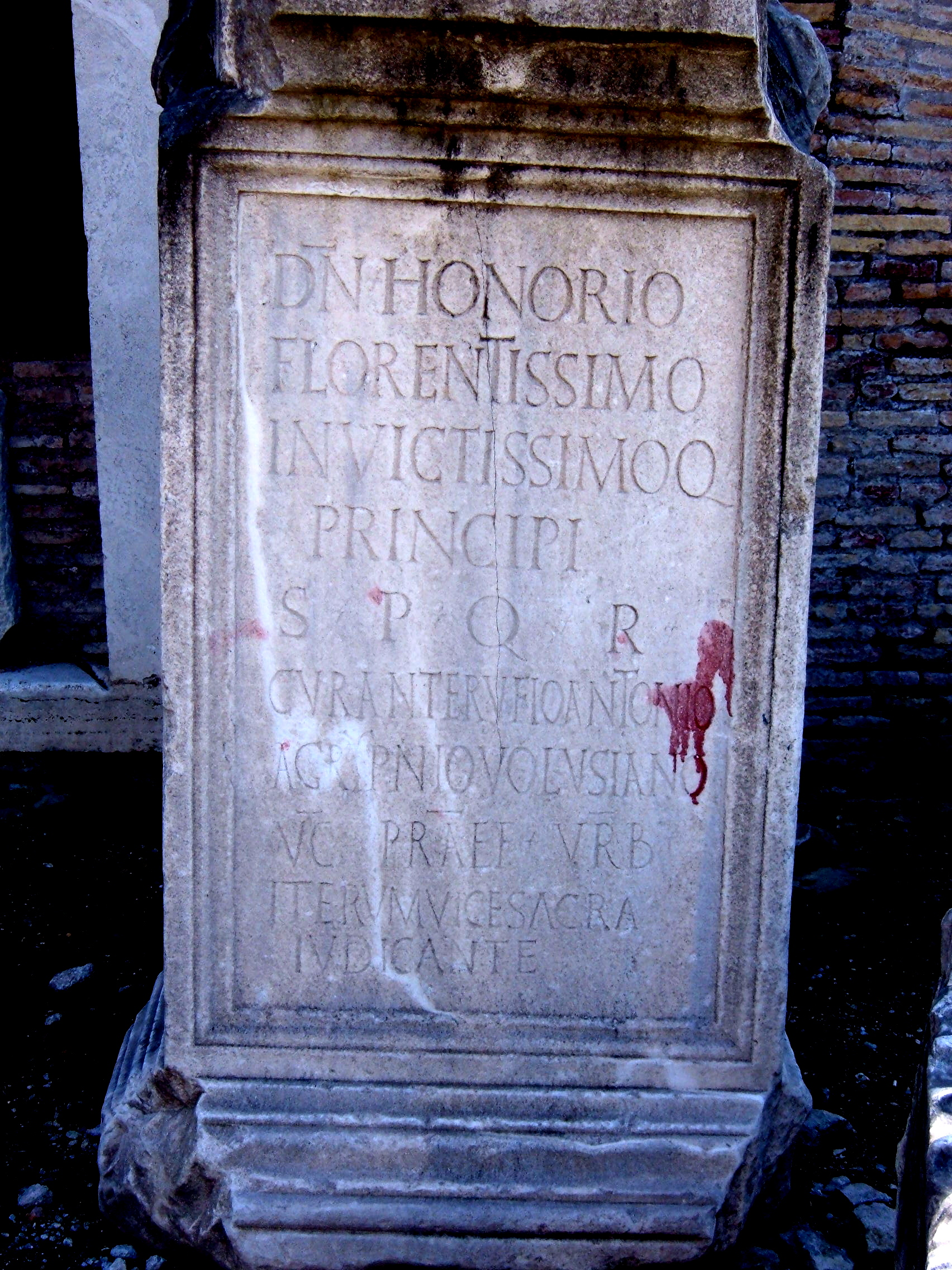
Inscription dedicated by Rufius Antonius Agrypnius to Honorius, Forum Romanum, Rome (CIL VI, 1194)

Rufius Antonius Agrypnius Volusianus (died 6 January 437) was a fifth-century Roman aristocrat who held at least two important posts during the reign of the emperor Honorius. He is best known for his exchange of letters with St. Augustine.

== Life ==
Volusianus was the son of Caeionius Rufius Albinus and Albina. His family owned property at Tubursicubure near Hippo Regius. Both Albina and Volusianus' niece, Melania, were devout Christians while Volusianus was a dutiful believer in the paganism of his ancestors. Peter Brown states that was part of a literary circle, characterized—to use Augustine's words—for his "cultivated, polished style, made outstanding by the charm of true Roman eloquence."

"Yet he was in an awkward position," notes Brown. "He already lived in a 'post-pagan' world.... He was the servant of Christian Emperors, and so not free to voice his opinion; and, as the son of a pious mother, he was constantly approached by bishops such as Augustine, and by enthusiastic laymen, such as Flavius Marcellinus." Ronald J. Weber observes that "debating with Bishop Augustine of Hippo on the dogma of the Incarnation mark Volusianus among the pagan intelligentsia capable enough to match wits with one of the greatest minds of the century and strong willed enough to defy the arguments of Augustine and persistent family pressures to convert to Christianity."

Augustine exchanged letters with Volusianus around 410, when the latter, by Brown's estimate, was about 30 years of age. Augustine later wrote of his own encounter with Volusianus in De Civitate Dei, in which he, politely, refuses to be baptised. Not long after their exchange of letters, Volusianus became proconsul of Africa, then praefectus urbi (417-418) and later praefectus praetorio italiae.

Despite his religious beliefs, he was selected by the Emperor Valentinian III and his mother the Empress Galla Placidia to deliver the formal request to the Emperor and Empress Theodosius II and Aelia Eudocia for the hand of their daughter Licinia Eudoxia in marriage. Volusianus left Rome in 436, and reached Constantinople where he delivered his message and initiated preliminary arrangements for the marriage before he fell fatally sick. On his deathbed and under the influence of his niece Melania, who had travelled from Jerusalem to be at his side, Volusianus converted to Christianity—an achievement Melania 's hagiographer recorded in her Vita. "The infamous pagan noble, leader of the Caeionii, was one of the last to accept the faith of Christ," observed Weber on this event.

== Notes ==
Political offices
Preceded by Petronius Probianus	Urban prefect of Rome; 417–418	Succeeded by Aurelius Anicius Symmachus
