= Turcia gens =

Ancient Roman family

The gens Turcia was an obscure plebeian family at ancient Rome. Few members of this gens appear in history, but a number are known from inscriptions, which indicate that the Turcii first came to prominence in the time of Augustus. After a period of relative unimportance, they repeatedly attained the highest offices of the Roman state from the third to the fifth century, holding several consulships.

== Praenomina ==
The main praenomina of the Turcii were Lucius, Gaius, and Publius, each of which was common throughout Roman history. One of the earliest known members of this gens bore the more distinctive praenomen Numerius, which was relatively uncommon at Rome, although more widespread in the countryside, and in Oscan-speaking regions of Italy.

== Branches and cognomina ==
The only distinct family of the Turcii bore the cognomen Apronianus, indicating descent from the Apronia gens. The Turcii Aproniani were already of senatorial rank by the third century, and repeatedly held high office through and beyond the end of the Western Empire.

== Members ==
This list includes abbreviated praenomina. For an explanation of this practice, see filiation.

- Numerius Turcius C. f., a man of praetorian rank, named in an inscription from Auximum in Picenum, dating from the Augustan era, along with his wife, the freedwoman Cocceia Italia, and his son, Gaius Turcius Rufus.
- Gaius Turcius N. f. C. n. Rufus, the son of Numerius Turcius and the freedwoman Cocceia Italia, named in an Augustan-era inscription from Auximum.
- Gaius Turcius Crescens, dedicated a first-century tomb at Puteoli in Campania for his patron, Gaius Sempronius Gallus.
- Lucius Turcius L. l. Rufus, a freedman named in an inscription from Rome, dating to AD 136.
- Turcia Procla, buried at Rome in a tomb built by her husband, Aulus Atinius Mercurius, dating from the reign of Trajan.
- Publius Turcius P. f. Severus, one of the duumvirs and ciratores of the city of Interamna Lirenas in Latium, commemorated in a second-century inscription as patron of the colony of Casinum, also in Latium.
- Lucius Turcius Apronianus, a senator, buried in a third-century tomb at Sulmo in Sabinum.
- Lucius Turcius Faesasius Apronianus, consul in an uncertain year during the middle of the third century, was honored along with his wife, Aemilia Callista, by a decree of the decurions of Aufidena in Samnium, recorded in an inscription dating between AD 250 and 280.
- Turcia Marcella, a woman of senatorial rank, and the daughter of a consul, was the wife of Tussus, (Note: This reading is uncertain, as no other definite examples of "Tussus" or "Tussius" are known. Authors of Prosopography of the Later Roman Empire and Christian Settipani prefer to read his name as Tussidius.) a decurion at Casilinum in Campania during the third or fourth century. She was perhaps a daughter of Lucius Turcius Faesasius Apronianus and sister to Lucius Turcius Secundus.
- Turcia Sabina, buried at Rome, along with her husband, Venuleius Charitonianus, in a tomb dating from the end of the third century, or the first quarter of the fourth.
- Lucius Turcius Apronianus, praefectus urbi from July to October in AD 339.
- Turcius Istafanius, built a fourth-century tomb at Rome for his wife, Aurelia Irena.
- Lucius Turcius L. f. Apronianus Asterius, followed in his father's footsteps, serving as praefectus urbi at some point between AD 362 and 364. He was the father of Lucius Turcius Secundus Apronianus.
- Lucius Turcius L. f. L. n. Secundus Asterius, as corrector Flaminiae et Piceni during the middle of the fourth century, added a colonnade above the arch of Augustus at Fanum Fortunae in Umbria, and rebuilt a bridge at Tibur in Latium. He was consul in an uncertain year. His wife was Julia Paterna Eunomia.
- Lucius Turcius Eutyches, dedicated a fourth- or fifth-century tomb at Rome for himself and his wife, Ostilia Vera.
- Turcius Secundus, vir clarissimus during the late fourth century, probably a son of Lucius Turcius Secundus Asterius and Julia Paterna Eunomia. He might have been the first of his family to convert to Christianity. His wife Proiecta was a daughter of Florus, praefectus praetorio Orientis in 381-83.
- Turcius Apronianus, Roman senator during the late fourth and early fifth centuries, probably a son of Lucius Turcius Secundus Asterius and Julia Paterna Eunomia. He was married to Avita, daughter of Placidus Severus and Antonia Marcianilla and maternal niece of Melania the Elder. He converted to Christianity in 405 under influence of Melania. He was an acquaintance of Paulinus of Nola and also of Rufinus of Aquileia, who possibly dedicated the translation of Origen to him.
- Turcius Rufius Apronianus Asterius, praefectus urbi at Rome, and consul in AD 494. A scholar who edited manuscripts of Sedulius and Vergil, one of his epigrams appears in the Latin Anthology. His wife was a niece of Pope Vigilius.

=== Undated Turcii ===
- Turcia, named in an inscription from Volsinii in Etruria.
- Lucia Turcia, buried at Volsinii, in a tomb dedicated by one or more of her children.
- Gaius Turcius, dedicated a tomb at Rome for Munatia, possibly his wife, and their family.
- Turcia Attica, buried at Grumentum in Lucania, in a tomb dedicated by her husband, Lucius Turcius Daphnus, a priest of Mercury.
- Lucius Turcius Daphnus, (Note: "Dafnus" in the original inscription.) a priest of Mercury, dedicated a tomb at Grumentum for his wife, Turcia Attica.
- Gaius Turcius C. f. Nebrus, had been aedile, quaestor, duumvir, and praetor. He was buried at Grumentum with a monument from his mother, the freedwoman Allidia Nebris.
- Lucius Turcius P. f. Rufus, the builder of Roman baths at Murcia in Hispania Citerior.
- Lucius Turcius Secundus, named in an inscription from Carpentoracte in Gallia Narbonensis.

== See also ==
- List of Roman gentes

== Bibliography ==
- Pieter Burmann, Anthologia Veterum Latinorum Epigramatum et Poematum (Latin Anthology), Heinrich Meyer, ed., Gerhard Fleischer, Leipzig (1835).
- Dictionary of Greek and Roman Biography and Mythology, William Smith, ed., Little, Brown and Company, Boston (1849).
- Theodor Mommsen et alii, Corpus Inscriptionum Latinarum (The Body of Latin Inscriptions, abbreviated CIL), Berlin-Brandenburgische Akademie der Wissenschaften (1853–present).
- Paul von Rohden, Elimar Klebs, & Hermann Dessau, Prosopographia Imperii Romani (The Prosopography of the Roman Empire, abbreviated PIR), Berlin (1898).
- Encyclopædia Britannica, Eleventh Edition (1911).
- Inscriptiones Christianae Urbis Romae, New Series, Rome (1922).
- La Carte Archéologique de la Gaule (Archaeological Map of Gaul, abbreviated CAG), Académie des Inscriptions et Belles-Lettres (1931–present).
- Heikki Solin, Epigraphische Untersuchungen in Roma und Umgebung (Epigraphic Investigations in Rome and its Surroundings), Helsinki (1975).
- Pietro Tamburini, ed., Un museo e il suo territorio: Il Museo territoriale del lago di Bolsena, Band 2: Dal periodo romano all'era moderna (A Museum and its Territory: the Territorial Museum of Lake Bolsena, Part 2: from the Roman Period to the Modern Era), Bolsena (2001).
- Heikki Solin, "Sulla storia costituzionale e amministrativa della Casinum romana" (On the Constitutional and Administrative History of Roman Casinum), in Le epigrafi della valle di Comina, Atti del nono convegno (The Epigraphy of the Valley of Cominio: Proceedings of the Ninth Conference), Heikki Solin, ed., San Donato Val di Comino, pp. 105–117 (2013).
- Christian Settipani. Continuité gentilice et continuité sénatoriale dans les familles sénatoriales romaines à l'époque impériale (2000).
- A. H. M. Jones & J. R. Martindale, The Prosopography of the Later Roman Empire (abbreviated PLRE), Cambridge University Press (1971–1992).
