= Felicianus (consul) =

Imperial Roman consul 337AD

Felicianus was a Roman politician and military officer in the fourth century AD.

== Career ==
Felicianus, a Christian, was appointed comes orientis in 335 AD. He thus held one of the most important military positions in the east of the empire. Whether Felicianus was the first bearer of this title, as recorded by John Malalas, is, however, controversial.

Emperor Constantine I, under whom he served, appointed him as consul for 337 AD. He held the office together with Fabius Titianus. However, Constantine died on 22 May of the consular year. The name of Felicianus was removed from certain inscriptions, giving rise to the theory that he was subjected to damnatio memoriae. Nothing more is heard of him after the purge of the Constantinian dynasty following the death of Constantine the Great.
