= Caesonius Bassus =

Roman politician

Caesonius Bassus was a politician of the late Roman Empire. Probably the son of Lucius Caesonius Ovinius Manlius Rufinianus Bassus, he was consul for 317 alongside Ovinius Gallicanus. Egyptian sources state they were in office from 8 January but sources from the western Roman Empire state that they only entered office on 17 February.

Political offices
Preceded by Antonius Caecina Sabinus, and Vettius Rufinus	Consul of the Roman Empire; 317 with Ovinius Gallicanus	Succeeded by Imp. Caesar C. Valerius Licinianus Licinius Augustus V, and Flavius Julius Crispus Caesar
