= Annius Eucharius Epiphanius =

Roman politician, prefect of Rome

Flavius Annius Eucharius Epiphanius (floruit 412–414 AD) was praefectus urbi of the city of Rome from October 15, 412 to May 27, 414 AD. He restored the Curia Julia.

== Sources ==
- CIL VI, 1718
- Martindale, John R., ed. (1980). "Fl. Annius Eucharius Epiphanius 7". The Prosopography of the Later Roman Empire: Volume II, AD 395–527. Cambridge: Cambridge University Press. p. 399. ISBN 0-521-20159-4.

Preceded by Palmatus	Praefectus urbi of Rome; 412–414	Succeeded by Rutilius Claudius Namatianus
