= Acilius Severus (consul) =

Acilius Severus was a member of the Roman aristocracy of the fourth century AD. He is known to have been consul with Vettius Rufinus as his colleague, and to have served as urban prefect of Rome (January 325 – November 326).

By his name, Severus appears to be related to the gens Acilia, an ancient Roman family whose descendants can be traced into the third century. However, it is not known how or even if whether Severus is related to Marcus Acilius Glabrio (consul 256) or Manius Acilius Aviola (consul 239).

Political offices
Preceded by Petronius Probianus; Amnius Anicius Iulianus	Roman consul 323 with Vettius Rufinus	Succeeded by Crispus Caesar III; Constantine Caesar III
