= Petronius Probianus =

Roman senator

Petronius Probianus (fl. 315–331 AD) was a politician of the Roman Empire.

== Life ==
Probianus was a member of the Petronii Probi, a family of the senatorial aristocracy. He was the son of Pompeius Probus, consul in 310, the father of Petronius Probinus, consul in 341, and of the poet Faltonia Betitia Proba, and the grandfather of Sextus Petronius Probus, consul in 371.

Probianus was proconsul of Africa in 315–317, consul in 322, and praefectus urbi of Rome from October 8, 329, to April 12, 331.

== Sources ==
- Lizzi Testa, Rita, Senatori, popolo, papi: il governo di Roma al tempo dei Valentiniani, Edipuglia, 2004, ISBN 88-7228-392-2, p. 367.
- "Faltonia Proba", The Catholic Encyclopedia, Volume XII, 1911, New York, Robert Appleton Company.

Political offices
Preceded by Crispus Caesar II; Constantine Caesar II	Roman consul 322 with Amnius Anicius Iulianus	Succeeded by Acilius Severus; Vettius Rufinus
Preceded by Amnius Anicius Paulinus	Praefectus urbi of Rome; 329–331	Succeeded by Publilius Optatianus Porfyrius
