= Bonosianus =

Politician

Bonosianus (fl. 410–411) was a politician of the Western Roman Empire.

He served as praefectus urbi of Rome from September 25, 410, to November 28, 411.

== Sources ==
- Codex Theodosianus XIV 1.6^{a}, XV 1.48^{a}
- Martindale, John R., ed. (1980). "Bonosianus". The Prosopography of the Later Roman Empire: Volume II, AD 395–527. Cambridge: Cambridge University Press. p. 240. ISBN 0-521-20159-4.

Preceded by Marcianus	Praefectus urbi of Rome; 410-411	Succeeded by Palmatus
