= Marcus Caeionius Silvanus =

Marcus Caeionius Silvanus was a Roman senator of the second century AD.

== Life ==
He was the ordinary consul of 156 with Gaius Serius Augurinus as his colleague. However, nothing more is presently known about his career.

Based on his cognomen Silvanus, Ronald Syme suggested that he was descended from the Plautii, specifically that his father was a son of Lucius Ceionius Commodus, consul 106, and Plautia, who died before he was old enough to be awarded the consulate. "Hence an unattested and short lived brother of L. Caesar -- and his son, M. Ceionius Silvanus, was therefore a first cousin of L. Verus."

== Proposed descendants ==
Christian Settipani has proposed that Silvanus was an ancestor of Caeionius Varus (225 or 230 – after 285), urban prefect in 284 and 295, married to (Rufia C.f. Procula) (b. 235) - perhaps daughter of Caius Rufius C.f. Proculus (200 or 205 – after 236), Cur. Oper. in 236, and wife (Publilia) (b. 220), sister of (Caius Rufius Festus) (b. 235 or 240), (c. v. of the Volsinii) and maternal niece of (Lucius Publilius) (b. 225), in turn perhaps the father of Lucius Publilius Volusianus, suffect consul at the end of the 3rd century. His son and daughter in law were perhaps the parents of (Marcus) Caeionius Proculus, suffect consul in 289, of C. Nummia Caeionia Umbria Rufia Albina, of Caeionia Marina (b. 260), married to Crepereius Amantius, and of Caius Caeionius Rufius Volusianus, consul in February 311 and in March 314, etc.

Political offices
| Preceded by Decimus Rupilius Severus, and Lucius Julius Titus Statilius Severus as consules suffecti | Consul of the Roman Empire; 156 with Gaius Serius Augurinus | Succeeded by Aulus Avillius Urinatius Quadratus, and Strabo Aemilianus as consules suffecti |
