= Flavius Maternianus =

Roman politician and soldier

Flavius Maternianus was a Roman politician, soldier, and Urban Prefect of Rome in the 3rd century AD.

== Biography ==
Flavius Maternianus was appointed to the position of Urban Prefect of Rome by Emperor Caracalla. Maternianus was known to be the only close friend of Caracalla, who trusted him heavily. In addition to his direct administration of the city, he led the troops in Rome, in Caracalla's absence.

According to the historian Herodian, Caracalla wrote a letter to Maternianus asking him to seek counsel from the best sorcerers and discover if anyone was attempting to usurp his Imperial power. Allegedly, Maternianus did so and in his reply mentioned the plot of the Praetorian Prefect Macrinus. However, Macrinus learned of the letter and had it destroyed.

His further fate is unknown. It is likely he was killed or otherwise fell into disgrace after Macrinus came to power. In 217, Macrinus appointed Marcus Oclatinius Adventus to the post of Urban Prefect in his stead.
