= Rufria gens =

Ancient Roman family

The gens Rufria was a minor plebeian family at ancient Rome. Members of this gens are first mentioned in imperial times. Few of the Rufrii appear in history, but others are known from inscriptions.

== Origin ==
The nomen Rufrius seems to be derived from the Latin ruber, red or ruddy, and is frequently confused with Rufius, derived from the similar rufus, red. Ruber may have been a cognomen given to someone with red or reddish hair.

== Members ==
- Rufrius Pollio, or Rubrius Pollio, appointed praetorian prefect by Claudius shortly after the assassination of Caligula. The emperor granted him a seat in the senate when he was in attendance. Possibly the same person as Rufius Pomfilius, a prefect whom Claudius had put to death.
- Rufrius Crispinus, or Rufius Crispinus, an eques who rose to the rank of praetorian prefect under Claudius, and was rewarded with the quaestorian insignia for apprehending Decimus Valerius Asiaticus in AD 47. Agrippina had him removed from his office in 52, and he was sent into exile in 66, as the former husband of the empress Poppaea Sabina. Sentenced to death, he took his own life.
- Rufrius or Rufius Crispinus, son of the praetorian prefect and Poppaea Sabina, was put to death by Nero.
- Rufrius Sulpicianus, legate of the thirteenth legion at some point between AD 211 and 222.

== See also ==
- List of Roman gentes

== Bibliography ==
- Lucius Annaeus Seneca (Seneca the Younger), Octavia (attributed).
- Flavius Josephus, Antiquitates Judaïcae (Antiquities of the Jews).
- Publius Cornelius Tacitus, Annales.
- Lucius Mestrius Plutarchus (Plutarch), Lives of the Noble Greeks and Romans.
- Gaius Suetonius Tranquillus, De Vita Caesarum (Lives of the Caesars, or The Twelve Caesars).
- Lucius Cassius Dio Cocceianus (Cassius Dio), Roman History.
- Theodor Mommsen et alii, Corpus Inscriptionum Latinarum (The Body of Latin Inscriptions, abbreviated CIL), Berlin-Brandenburgische Akademie der Wissenschaften (1853–present).
- John C. Traupman, The New College Latin & English Dictionary, Bantam Books, New York (1995).
