= Oclatia gens =

Ancient Roman family

The gens Oclatia was an obscure plebeian family at ancient Rome. The only member known to have held any magistracy is Gaius Oclatius Modestus, quaestor in the first half of the second century, but many Oclatii are known from inscriptions.

== Origin ==
The nomen Oclatius belongs to a class of gentilicia formed using the suffix -atius, based on place-named ending in -as or -atis, and passive participles ending in -atus. It appears to share a common root with the nomen Oclatinius, and both might be an orthographic variant of Ocratius.

== Members ==
This list includes abbreviated praenomina. For an explanation of this practice, see filiation.

- Oclatia Q. f., buried at the present site of Yecla de Yeltes, formerly part of Lusitania, aged sixty.
- Lucius Oclatius, dedicated a monument at Rome to Florentia Primitiva, aged thirteen.
- Publius Oclatius, named in a list of argentarii at Rome.
- Titus Oclatius, buried at Rome.
- Oclatia Ampliata, daughter of Ampliatus Gaius Vitalis, buried at Beneventum, aged twenty-five years, ten months, and six days.
- Gaius Oclatius Aprilus, buried at Rome, aged thirty-six years, five months.
- Oclatia Avita, the wife of Marcus Oclatius Avitus, and mother of Justus.
- Marcus Oclatius Avitus, an administrative decurion, was the husband of Oclatia Avita and father of Justus, buried at Emona in Pannonia Superior.
- Oclatius Chereas, hushand of Evatia Venusta, named in a funerary inscription from Caesarea in Mauretania Caesariensis.
- Oclatia Crescentina, buried at Rome.
- Oclatia Damalis, the wife of Lucius Oclatius Faustus, to whom she dedicated a monument at Rome.
- Lucius Oclatius Daphnus, dedicated a monument to his wife, Rufria Magna, aged twenty-one, at Portus in Latium.
- Gaius Oclatius Epitectus, husband of Maxima, buried at Brixia in the province of Venetia et Histria.
- Gaius Oclatius Euopius, the brother of Nigrinus, buried at Rome, aged twenty-four.
- Oclatius Eutyches, a soldier mentioned in an inscription from Ostia, dating to the reign of Septimius Severus.
- Oclatia L. l. Expectata, mentioned in an inscription from Emona.
- Lucius Oclatius Faustus, husband of Oclatia Damalis and father of Oclatius Silvanus, buried at Rome.
- Oclatius Favor, named in an inscription from Ravenna, dating to AD 299.
- Gaius Oclatius Felix, buried at Capua.
- Tiberius Oclatius Felix, grandson of Tiberius Oclatius Hermias, with whom he dedicated a monument at Rome to his grandmother, Octavia Fortunata.
- Lucius Oclatius L. f. Florentinus, a soldier buried at Feltria in Venetia et Histria.
- Oclatius Fortunatus, named in a funerary inscription from Arelate in Gallia Narbonensis.
- Tiberius Oclatius Hermias, husband of Octavia Fortunata, to whom he and his grandson, Tiberius Oclatius Felix, dedicated a monument at Rome.
- Lucius Oclatius Hyginus, dedicated a monument to his wife, Papiria Metellica, buried at Salona in Dalmatia.
- Oclatius Justus, son of Marcus Oclatius Avitus and Oclatia Avita, buried at Emona, aged sixteen.
- Lucius Oclatius Licinianus, buried at Cirta in Numidia, aged seven.
- Gaius Oclatius Macro, a resident of Caralis in Sardinia, named in an inscription from Anela, dating to AD 68.
- Oclatia Masvonia, buried at Mogontiacum in Germania Superior.
- Gaius Oclatius Modestus, a soldier who served under Trajan and Hadrian, and later became an augur, quaestor, and a judicial magistrate at Beneventum.
- Lucius Oclatius Primus, named in an inscription from Rome.
- Lucius Oclatius L. f. Rocianus, son of Tertius and brother of Florentinus, to whom he dedicated a monument at Feltre.
- Oclatia Sabina, named in an inscription from Ravenna, dating to AD 299.
- Lucius Oclatius Sabinus, buried at Madauros in Africa Proconsularis, aged eight.
- Oclatius Sacerdos, primus pilus in the first legion during the reign of Gordian III, mentioned in an inscription from Bonna in Germania Inferior.
- Oclatia Secunda, named in a libationary inscription from Tabernae in Germania Superior.
- Lucius Oclatius Severus, a soldier named in two inscriptions from Ravenna, who dedicated a monument to his colleague, Titus Helvius Macrinus.
- Tiberius Oclatius Severus, buried at Doclea in Dalmatia.
- Tiberius Oclatius Severus, a soldier stationed at Quintana in Raetia.
- Oclatius L. f. Silvanus, together with his mother, Oclatia Damalis, dedicated a monument at Rome to his father, Lucius Oclatius Faustus.
- Lucius Oclatius Socratius, father of Lucius Julius Primus, to whom he dedicated a monument at Salona.
- Lucius Oclatius Tarquiniensis, a soldier of the fifteenth legion, mentioned in an inscription from Emona.
- Lucius Oclatius L. f. Tertius, father of Lucius Oclatius Florentinus and Lucius Oclatius Rocianus, buried at Feltre.
- Oclatia Victorina, wife of Lucius Fenius Achilleus, who dedicated a monument to her at Rome.
- Gaius Oclatius Zosimus, husband of Oclatia Anthis, was one of the municipal sexviri at Ravenna.

== See also ==
- List of Roman gentes

== Bibliography ==
- Theodor Mommsen et alii, Corpus Inscriptionum Latinarum (The Body of Latin Inscriptions, abbreviated CIL), Berlin-Brandenburgische Akademie der Wissenschaften (1853–present).
- Giovanni Battista de Rossi, Inscriptiones Christianae Urbis Romanae Septimo Saeculo Antiquiores (Christian Inscriptions from Rome of the First Seven Centuries, abbreviated ICUR), Vatican Library, Rome (1857–1861, 1888).
- René Cagnat et alii, L'Année épigraphique (The Year in Epigraphy, abbreviated AE), Presses Universitaires de France (1888–present).
- George Davis Chase, "The Origin of Roman Praenomina", in Harvard Studies in Classical Philology, vol. VIII (1897).
- B. M. Apollonji-Ghetti & Antonia Ferrua, Esplorazioni sotto la Confessione di San Pietro in Vaticano esetuite negli anni 1940–1949 (Explorations beneath St. Peter’s, abbreviated Esplorazioni), Vatican City (1951).
- Liborio Hernández Guerra, Epigrafía de época romana de la provincia de Salamanca (Epigraphy of the Roman Era from the Province of Salamanca, abbreviated ERPSalamanca), Universidad de Valladolid (2001).
- Cédric Brélaz, Corpus des inscriptions greques et latines de Philippes Band 2, Teil 1 (Body of Greek and Latin Inscriptions from Philippi, vol. 2, part 1, abbreviated CIPh-2-1), Athens (2014).
