= Rutilius Claudius Namatianus =

Roman Imperial poet

Rutilius Claudius Namatianus (fl. 5th century) was a Roman Imperial poet, best known for his Latin poem, De reditu suo, in elegiac metre, describing a coastal voyage from Rome to Gaul in 417. The poem was in two books; the exordium of the first and the greater part of the second have been lost. What remains consists of about seven hundred lines.

Whether Rutilius had converted to Christianity (the state church of the Roman Empire during his time) has been a matter of scholarly debate, but in the early 21st century, editors of his work concluded that he had not. Alan Cameron, a leading scholar of Late Antiquity, agrees that he "probably" remained unconverted from Rome's traditional religious practices, but that his hostility was not to Christianity as it was practiced by the vast majority of citizens of the Empire, but rather against the total renunciation of public life advocated by the ascetics.

== Life ==
=== Origins ===
Rutilius was a native of southern Gaul (Toulouse or perhaps Poitiers), and belonged, like Sidonius Apollinaris, to one of the great governing families of the Gallic provinces. His father, whom he calls Lachanius, had held high offices in Italy and at the imperial court, had been governor of Tuscia (Etruria and Umbria), vicar of Britain, then imperial treasurer (comes sacrarum largitionum), imperial recorder (quaestor), and governor of Rome (praefectus urbi) in 414. The voyage recorded in De reditu suo has been variously dated to 415, 416, or 417, but the publication in 1973 of a fragment of the missing portion of the poem, which contains a reference to the second consulship of Constantius III, confirms the date of 417, which had already been argued independently on other grounds by earlier scholars.

=== Career ===
Rutilius boasts his career to have been no less distinguished than his father's, and particularly indicates that he had been secretary of state (magister officiorum) and governor of the capital (praefectus urbi). His poem was written the tempestuous period between the death of Theodosius I (395), and the fall of the usurper Priscus Attalus. During this period he was witness to the career of Stilicho as de facto emperor of the West; the hosts of Radagaisus rolled back from Italy, only to sweep over Gaul and Spain; the defeats and triumphs of Alaric I; the three sieges and final sack of Rome; the dissipation of Heraclianus's vast armament; and the fall of seven pretenders to the Western throne.

=== Religious issues ===
It is clear that the sympathies of Rutilius were with those who, during this period, dissented from, and when they could, opposed the general tendencies of imperial policy. He himself indicates that he was intimately acquainted with the circle of the great orator Quintus Aurelius Symmachus, who scouted Stilicho's compact with the Goths, and who led the Roman Senate to support the pretenders Eugenius and Attalus, in the hope of reinstating the gods whom Emperor Julian had failed to save.

While making few direct assertions about historical characters or events, Rutilius' poem compels some important conclusions about the politics and religion of the time. The attitude of the writer towards Paganism is remarkable: the whole poem is intensely Pagan, and is penetrated by the feeling that the world of literature and culture is, and must remain, pagan; that outside of Paganism lies a realm of barbarism. The poet wears an air of exalted superiority over the religious innovators of his day, and entertains a buoyant confidence that the future of the ancient gods of Rome will not belie their glorious past. He scorns invective and apology, and does not hesitate to reveal, with Claudian, a suppressed grief at the indignities put upon the old religion by the new. As a statesman, he is at pains to avoid offending those politic Christian senators over whom pride in their country had at least as great a power as attachment to their new religion. Only once or twice does Rutilius speak directly of Christianity, and then only to attack the monks, whom the secular authorities had hardly as yet recognized, and whom, indeed, only a short time before, a Christian emperor had conscripted by the thousands into the ranks of his army. Judaism could be assailed by Rutilius without wounding either pagans or Christians, but he clearly intimates that he hates it chiefly as the evil root from which the rank plant of Christianity had sprung. However the first Christian missionary in Ireland was a relative and personal friend of Rutilius, Palladius (bishop of Ireland).

Edward Gibbon writes that emperor Honorius rigorously excluded all dissenters to the Catholic Church from holding any office in the state. But Rutilius paints a different picture of political life. His poem portrays a senate at Rome composed of past office-holders (the majority of whom were certainly still pagans), a Christian party whose Christianity was more political than religious, and a prevalent spirit of traditional Roman religious toleration. The atmosphere of the capital, perhaps even of all Italy, was still charged with paganism. The court was far in advance of the people, and the persecuting laws were in large part incapable of execution. Some ecclesiastical historians have fondly imagined that after the sack of Rome the bishop Innocent returned to a position of predominance, but no one who accepts Rutilius' observations can entertain this idea.

Perhaps the most interesting lines in the whole poem are those where Rutilius assails the memory of "dire Stilicho", as he names him. In Rutilius' view, Stilicho, fearing to suffer all that had caused himself to be feared, removed the defences of the Alps and Apennines that the provident gods had interposed between the barbarians and the Eternal City, and planted the cruel Goths, his skinclad minions, in the very sanctuary of the empire: "he plunged an armed foe in the naked vitals of the land, his craft being freer from risk than that of openly inflicted disaster... May Nero rest from all the torments of the damned, that they may seize on Stilicho; for Nero smote his own mother, but Stilicho the mother of the world!"

This appears to be a uniquely authentic expression of the feelings of perhaps a majority of the Roman senate against Stilicho. He had merely imitated the policy of Theodosius with regard to the barbarians; but even that powerful emperor had met with a passive opposition from the old Roman families. Those who had seen Stilicho surrounded by his Goth bodyguards naturally looked on the Goths who assailed Rome as Stilicho's avengers. Historians of the later empire such as Paulus Orosius believed that Stilicho called in the Goths to increase his sway and was plotting to make his son emperor. Rutilius' poem, however, holds that it was merely to save himself from impending ruin. Although some Christian historians even asserted that Stilicho (a staunch Arian) intended to restore paganism, Rutilius depicts him as its most uncompromising foe, as evidenced by his destruction of the Sibylline books. This alone is sufficient, in the eyes of Rutilius, to account for the disasters that afterwards befell the city, just as Flavius Merobaudes, a generation or two later, traced the miseries of his own day to the overthrow of the ancient rites of Vesta (for a sharply different view of Stilicho, see Claudian.)

== Style ==
Rutilius handles the elegiac couplet with great metrical purity and freedom, and betrays many signs of long study in the elegiac poetry of the Augustan era. His poem's Latin is unusually clean for the times, and is generally classical, both in vocabulary and construction. Although lacking Claudian's genius, Rutilius also lacks his tendency toward gaudiness and exaggeration; the old-fashioned directness of Rutilius contrasts favorably with the labored complexity of Ausonius. More traditional, Rutilius might have better claim to be called "the last of the Roman poets" rather than Claudian or Merobaudes.

Rutilius begins his poem with an almost dithyrambic address to the goddess Roma, "whose glory has ever shone the brighter for disaster, and who will rise once more in her might and confound her barbarian foes". Next, he refers to the destruction of roads and property wrought by the Goths, to the state of the havens at the mouths of the Tiber, and the general decay of nearly all the old commercial ports on the coast. Rutilius even exaggerates the desolation of the once important city of Cosa in Etruria, whose walls have scarcely changed since his time. The port that served Pisa, almost alone of all those visited by Rutilius, is depicted as having retained its prosperity, with villagers celebrating the festival of Osiris.

== History of De reditu suo and its editions ==
The majority of the existing manuscripts of Rutilius are descendants of a damaged and incomplete ancient manuscript found at the monastery of Bobbio by Giorgio Galbiato, the secretary of Georgius Merula, in 1493. This manuscript has not been seen since comte Claude Alexandre de Bonneval, a general in the service of the Austrian commander, Prince Eugene of Savoy, removed it from the monastery in 1706. The three best witnesses to the lost manuscript are a copy in Vienna (identified by the siglum V) made in 1501 by Jacopo Sannazaro, Filippo Bononi, and a third unknown copyist; a second copy in Rome (identified by the siglum R) made around 1530 by Ioannes Andreas Crucianus; and the editio princeps of the poem printed by Giovanni Battista Pio in Bologna in 1520). In 1970 Mirella Ferrari announced the discovery of a small fragment of the Bobbio manuscript, reused in the binding of a manuscript of Virgil now in the Royal Library in Copenhagen. The fragment, which had apparently been reused before the discovery of the damaged manuscript by Galbiato in 1493, was written in the 7th or 8th century; it preserves the ends of 39 lines from an otherwise lost portion of book 2.

The principal editions since have been those by Kaspar von Barth (1623), Pieter Burman (1731, in his edition of the minor Latin poets, where the poem also appears under the title Iter), Ernst Friedrich Wernsdorf (1778, part of a similar collection), August Wilhelm Zumpt (1840), and the critical edition by Lucian Müller (Leipzig, Teubner, 1870), and another by Jules Vessereau (1904); also an annotated edition by Charles Haines Keene, containing a translation by George Francis Savage-Armstrong (1906).

There is some variation of Namatianus' name in the manuscripts. Rutilius Claudius Namatianus comes from R, while V has Rutilius Claudius Numantianus. According to Keene Namatianus is used in Codex Theodosianus as the name "of a magister officiorum in 412 AD", probably to be identified with the author and therefore has the weight of evidence. Other variants date from a later time and have no authority: Numantinus, Munatianus. Müller and most editors write the poet's name as "Claudius Rutilius Namatianus", instead of Rutilius Claudius Namatianus; but if the identification of the poet's father with the Claudius mentioned in the Codex Theodosianus is correct, they are probably wrong.

The latest and fullest edition of Namatianus is by E. Doblhofer. Harold Isbell includes a translation in his anthology, The Last Poets of Imperial Rome.

== Film ==
The Italian film The Voyage Home is based on Namatianus's work and premiered in 2004.

== See also ==
- Caecina Decius Aginatius Albinus

== Notes ==
Preceded by Annius Eucharius Epiphanius	Praefectus urbi of Rome; 414	Succeeded by Caecina Decius Acinatius Albinus
