= The Voyage Home (2004 film) =

2004 film directed by Claudio Bondì

- Film poster
- Directed by: Claudio Bondì
- Written by: Claudio Bondì; Alessandro Ricci
- Based on: De reditu suo by Rutilius Claudius Namatianus
- Produced by: Alessandro Verdecchi
- Starring: Elia Schilton
- Cinematography: Marco Onorato
- Edited by: Roberto Schiavone
- Music by: Lamberto Macchi
- Production company: Misami Film
- Distributed by: Orango Film Distribuzione
- Release date: 16 January 2004
- Running time: 102 minutes
- Country: Italy
- Language: Italian

The Voyage Home (Latin: De reditu; Italian: Il ritorno, lit. 'The Return') is a 2004 Italian historical drama film directed by Claudio Bondì and starring Elia Schilton. It tells the story of a nobleman who travels from Rome by boat to his native Gaul five years after the sack of Rome. It is loosely based on the 5th-century poem De reditu suo by Rutilius Claudius Namatianus.

== Plot ==
Five years after the sack of Rome by the Visigoths under Alaric, Rutilius Claudius Namatianus travels from Rome toward his native Tolosa in Gaul, with the intention to inspect what damages the invaders might have caused. Rutilius is a pagan nobleman with the high-ranking title of praefectus urbi. Because the land route is ruined and unsafe, he has to travel by boat. He also has a secret mission: to try to convince the Emperor, who is installed in Ravenna, to restore the dominion of Rome.

== Themes ==
=== Criticism of Christianity ===
The basis for the film is a 5th-century poem by the Roman writer Rutilius Claudius Namatianus, discovered in incomplete form and titled De reditu suo in the 15th century. The original poem contains strong criticism of the Christian monastic movement, but not as a main theme. In the film, however, criticism of Christianity is a major focus. Both visually and thematically, The Voyage Home ties in with Roberto Rossellini's 1972 film Augustine of Hippo, for which Claudio Bondì had been an assistant director. Rossellini portrayed a corrupt Christianity but also praised the Christian faith of Augustine of Hippo. Bondì's film goes further and offers no positive view of the religion. Christianity and the Christian church are presented as fanatical and in opposition to the Roman values of peace and cultivation. Christian monks are portrayed as primitive, and in one scene evoke the Cyclops of the Odyssey, throwing rocks at Rutilius and his company.

This sets The Voyage Home apart from many 20th-century films set in late antiquity. Not only is there a positive identification with the Romans, but the positive aspect of Rome is equated with its pre-Christian elements, rather than the Christianity of Constantine or Theodosius. The role of "barbarians", present in 20th-century films like Douglas Sirk's Sign of the Pagan (1954), is not occupied by Goths or Huns, but by Christian fundamentalists. Similar perspectives on late antiquity appear in other early 21st-century films, such as Alejandro Amenábar's Agora from 2009.

=== Language ===
Several different languages appear in the film. In addition to the characters who speak Italian, there is an Albanian-speaking Isis priestess, a Polish-speaking helmsman, and an Eritrean maid. The intention was to show how the Roman Empire had lost the unifying element of a shared language.

=== The sack of Rome and 9/11 ===
Bondì thought the setting shortly after the sack of Rome made the story relevant in the early 21st century, saying that the protagonist's "difficulty is very similar to ours with the Islamic world". Both Bondì in interviews and Italian journalists who wrote about the film when it was released likened the sack of Rome to the September 11 attacks. Bondì described it as "a traumatic and unbelievable event, something like the tragedy of the Twin Towers, that is, a direct attack at the core of the world's greatest power". The same analogy was made when a new English translation of the poem was published in 2016.

== Cast ==
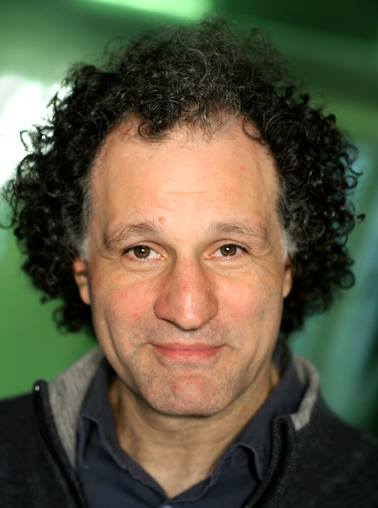
Schilton in 2014

- Elia Schilton: Claudio Rutilio Namaziano
- Rodolfo Corsato: Minervio
- Romuald Andrzej Klos: Socrate
- Marco Beretta: Rufio
- Caterina Deregibus: Sabina
- Roberto Accornero: Vittorino
- Xhilda Lapardhaja: priestess
- Roberto Herlitzka: Protadio

== Production ==
Claudio Bondì became familiar with De reditu suo when he studied Latin literature at the Sapienza University of Rome as a 20-year-old in 1964. He was attracted to the poem for its understanding of ancient culture and thought it had an "extraordinary modernity". Bondì characterised Rutilius as a Stoic and Epicurean and wanted to make a film where the poet's political and philosophical themes are apparent.

The Voyage Home was produced by Misami Film. It received support from the Ministry of Cultural Heritage and Activities. It was made on a budget of three million euros.

Bondì aimed to be historically accurate when depicting phenomena like slavery, and at the same time make The Voyage Home relevant for contemporary viewers. The actor Elia Schilton won the leading role because Bondì thought his face looked ancient, because he spoke French, and because he had a peculiar accent.

== Reception ==
The Voyage Home was released in Italian cinemas by Orango Film Distribuzione on 16 January 2004. It received little attention and performed poorly at the box office. Emiliano Morreale wrote in FilmTV that it seems to be modeled on Roberto Rossellini's television works, and therefore "appears like a UFO in the Italian cinema of today". He thought there were problems with the "economic poverty of the staging", parts of the casting, and the lack of intensity, but wrote that "a few well-chosen sets" partially save the film. The film was shown at the 2005 Philadelphia Film Festival. Steven Rea of The Philadelphia Inquirer wrote that it has "an odd static quality about it" where "only the talk seems to linger on – and on". He saw influences from Pier Paolo Pasolini and Rossellini, but also wrote that the limited budget on occasions makes it feel "like a Monty Python parody". Todd Brown of Twitch wrote that "those looking for a violent toga epic a la Gladiator are looking in the wrong place – this film is far more concerned with politics and frame of mind – but history buffs will find a lot to love".

== See also ==
- List of films set in ancient Rome
