= Gaius Avienus =

Roman military leader of the 1st century BCE

Gaius Avienus was an Equites of the Aviena gens of ancient Rome who lived in the 1st century BCE.

He served as the military tribune of the tenth legion, probably an appointee of Julius Caesar. He was in active service from at least 47 BCE. In 46 BCE, he sailed from Lilybaeum to the African town of Uzita, where Caesar's camp was located, commandeering a vessel of the convoy for his own private use. When he arrived, Caesar realized Avienus's ship had brought only his own personal slaves and pack animals, and not one single Roman soldier.

The next day, Caesar called an assembly of legionnaires and publicly, dishonorably discharged (ignominiosa missio) Avienus from service. This was a severe disgrace, which disentitled a soldier from all benefits and rewards, and classed the offender as infames: they were still technically Roman citizens, but they were stigmatized and excluded from civic life.

This was also intended to punish Avienus for an incident in 47 BCE in which, Caesar believed, Avienus had incited soldiers of the tenth legion to mutiny.

He was probably from Campania.
