= Caecina Decius Aginatius Albinus =

Roman aristocrat

Caecina Decius Aginatius (or Acinatius) Albinus (floruit 414) was an aristocrat of the Roman Empire. He was praefectus urbi in 414, succeeding his friend Rutilius Namatianus, and possibly again in 426.

== Biography ==
His father was probably Caecina Decius Albinus, and his grandfather Aginatius; Albinus was therefore a member of the Roman aristocracy related to the families of the Ceionii and the Decii. Caecina Decius Basilius, consul in 463, might be his son.

Albinus was an associate of the poet Rutilius Claudius Namatianus, who described him as "a youth in the flower of life" (vitae flore puer), owning a villa near Namatianus at Volaterrae in modern Tuscany, having a son Rufius, and who was Namatianus' successor as praefectus urbi. During his tenure as praefectus urbi, Albinus requested the emperor Honorius to increment the food reserved for the population of Rome, as it was increasing after the sack of Alaric in 410.

Alan Cameron has argued that Albinus is identical to the "clarissimo Albino" the grammarian Servius dedicated his treatise on meter. If this is correct, it would strengthen Cameron's further identification of Albinus with the Decius who is mentioned near the beginning of the Saturnalia of Macrobius.

Ronald J. Weber points out that it is possible he was also the praefectus urbi Albinus attested in a 426 law preserved in the Codex Theodosianus, arguing that the 12-year gap is not a significant objection to this identification. If they are not the same person, then Albinus vanishes from the historical record after 414.

== Notes ==
Political offices
Preceded by Rutilius Claudius Namatianus	Urban prefect of Rome; 414	Succeeded by Gracchus
