= Ovinius Gallicanus =

Ovinius Gallicanus (floruit 293 – 317) was a senator of the Roman Empire, probably the first Christian Roman consul.

In 293 or 300 he was the curator of Teanum Sidicinum. On 4 August 316 he is attested as praefectus urbi of Rome, as successor to Gaius Vettius Cossinius Rufinus, and kept the office at least until 15 May 317, the year he was also consul, to be succeeded by Septimius Bassus.

He might be identified with the Gallicanus who gave some lands to the church of Saints Peter, Paul, and John the Baptist in Ostia.

== Bibliography ==
- Abhandlungen der sächsischen Akademie der Wissenschaften zu Leipzig, philologisch-historische Klasse, Akademie-Verlag, 1850, p. 39.
- Champlin, Edward. "Saint Gallicanus (Consul 317)". Phoenix 36, 1 (1982): 71–76 .
- Martindale, John R.; Jones, A. H. M.; Morris, John, eds. (1971). "Ovinius Gallicanus 3". The Prosopography of the Later Roman Empire: Volume I, AD 260–395. Cambridge: Cambridge University Press. p. 383. ISBN 0-521-07233-6.
- Moncur, David, and Peter J. Heather (eds.), Politics, Philosophy, and Empire in the Fourth Century: Select Orations of Themistius, Liverpool University Press, 2001, ISBN 0-85323-106-0, p. 58.
- Hedrick, Charles W., History and Silence: Purge and Rehabilitation of Memory in Late Antiquity, University of Texas Press, 2000, ISBN 0-292-73121-3, p. 55.

Political offices
Preceded by Antonius Caecina Sabinus, and Vettius Rufinus	Consul of the Roman Empire; 317 with Caesonius Bassus	Succeeded by Imp. Caesar C. Valerius Licinianus Licinius Augustus V, and Flavius Iulius Crispus Caesar
Preceded by Gaius Vettius Cossinius Rufinus	Praefectus urbi of Rome; August 4, 316 – May 15, 317	Succeeded by Septimius Bassus
