= Marcus Caeionius Proculus =

Roman suffect consul

Marcus Caeionius Proculus (250 or 255 – after 289) was a suffect consul in 289.

He was perhaps the son of (Marcus) Caeionius Varus (225 or 230 – after 285), praefectus urbi of Rome in 284 and 295, and of his wife Rufia C.f. Procula (born 235). His possible father was a descendant of Marcus Caeionius Silvanus, consul in 156.

Married to Alfenia Juliana (b. 260 or 265), perhaps daughter of Lucius Alfenius Virius Julianus (b. 230), a relative of Cassius Apronianus, they were perhaps the parents of:

- (Caeionia) (b. 285 or 290), married to (Pincius) (b. 280), clarissimus vir at the beginning of the 4th century, and they were perhaps the parents of (Pincia) (b. 305), married to Amnius Manius Caesonius Nicomachus Anicius Paulinus Honorius or Amnius Anicius Paulinus, consul in 334
- Caeionius Apronianus (290 – after 313 or 316), Patron of Cillium
- Marcus Caeionius Julianus Camenius (285 – after 334), praefectus urbi in 333, married to Publilia (?), perhaps the parents of:
  - Caeionius Italicus (310 – after 343), consularis Numidiae in 343
  - Publilius Caeionius Julianus (315 – after 355), corrector Tusciae ca 355, married to (Tarracia) (b. 320), perhaps the daughter of Tarracius Nu..., clarissimus vir at the beginning of the 4th century, and he was perhaps the father and she certainly the mother of:
    - (Caeionius?) Tarracius Bassus (340 – after 376), praefectus urbi in 375 or 376, Patron of a certain Auchenius
    - Alfenius Caeionius Julianus Camenius (343 – 385), Vicarius of Africa in 381, Pontifex Maior
