= Lucius Aelius Helvius Dionysius =

Lucius Aelius Helvius Dionysius was a Roman statesman who served as the Proconsul of Africa from 296 to 300 and as the Praefectus urbi from 301 to 302.

Preceded by Titus Flavius Postumius Titianus	Proconsul of Africa; 296 – 300	Succeeded by Amnius Anicius Julianus
Preceded by Pompeio Appio Faustino	Praefectus urbi 301 – 302	Succeeded by Nummius Tuscus
