= Quintus Flavius Maesius Egnatius Lollianus Mavortius =

Roman senator

Quintus Flavius Maesius Egnatius Lollianus signo Mavortius (fl. 330–356) was a politician of the Roman Empire.

In the 18th century an acephalous statue of Mavortius was discovered in Puteoli, then Pozzuoli (near Naples, Italy).

== Life ==
It is speculated by his name that he was son of an Egnatius Lollianus and wife a Flavia, daughter of a Quintus Flavius and wife a Maesia, and brother of Egnatia Lolliana, wife of Rufius Caecina Postumianus, both paternal grandchildren of Egnatius Lucillus, speculated son of Egnatius Lucillianus and paternal grandson of Lucius Egnatius Victor Lollianus. However, a familial relationship between the imperial members of the gens Egnatii and Egnatius Lucillianus has been described as "extremely doubtful". But his and his sister nomina Egnatius / Egnatia and their cognomina Lollianus / Lolliana point to a direct descent connection to their given great-great-grandfather.

A pagan, he was governor of Campania from 328 to 335, comes Orientis from 330 to 336, proconsul of Africa from 334 to 337, praefectus urbi of Rome in 342, consul in 355 and praetorian prefect of Illyricum for Constantius II between 355 and 356.

He encouraged the senatorial writer Julius Firmicus Maternus to write an astrological essay, the Matheseos libri VIII, that the author dedicated to Lollianus.

He married Cornelia Severa, possibly a great-great-granddaughter of Gnaeus Cornelius Paternus, by whom he had a son, Quintus Flavius Egnatius Placidus Severus.

== Sources ==
- Martindale, John R.; Jones, A. H. M.; Morris, John, eds. (1971). The Prosopography of the Later Roman Empire: Volume I, AD 260–395. Cambridge: Cambridge University Press. ISBN 0-521-07233-6.
- Mennen, Inge, Power and Status in the Roman Empire, 193–284 AD (2011)

== Bibliography ==
- Kenney, Edward John, The Cambridge History of Classical Literature, Cambridge University Press, 1983, ISBN 0-521-27371-4, p. 88.

Political offices
Preceded by Constantius Augustus VII; Constantius Caesar III	Roman consul 355 with Arbitio	Succeeded by Constantius Augustus VIII; Julian Caesar
Preceded by Aurelius Celsinus (I)	Urban prefect of Rome; April–July 342	Succeeded by Aconius Catullinus
