= Aviena gens =

Roman family

The gens Aviena, occasionally written Avienia, was an obscure plebeian family at ancient Rome. Hardly any members of this gens are mentioned in history, but a number of Avieni are known from inscriptions.

== Origin ==
The nomen Avienus belongs to a class of names formed using the suffix -enus, typically derived from other gentilicia. There was a gens Avia, also known primarily from inscriptions, derived from avus, grandfather.

== Praenomina ==
The main praenomina of the Avieni were Sextus and Titus, with a few other names receiving occasional use, including Gaius, Publius, and Quintus. All of these were very common throughout Roman history. One family of the Avieni at Ostia used Sextus alone, and were differentiated by their cognomina, a phenomenon sometimes referred to as the "fossilization" of a praenomen, which became common in imperial times.

== Branches and cognomina ==
The Avieni do not appear to have been divided into distinct stirpes, or branches, identified by hereditary surnames. There was a family of this name at Ostia, where at least some of them were part of the shipwrights' guild, but the members of this family used distinctive personal cognomina.

== Members ==
This list includes abbreviated praenomina. For an explanation of this practice, see filiation.

- Gaius Avienus, a military tribune with the tenth legion, under the command of Caesar, who dismissed him due to his conduct in the African war, in 46 BC.
- Avienia, named in an inscription from Rome.
- Avienus, the husband of Clodia, named in an inscription from Ameria in Umbria, dating to the late first century BC.
- Avienus, named in an inscription from Haedui in Gallia Lugdunensis.
- Avienus, named in an inscription from Bituriges Cubi in Gallia Aquitania.
- Avienus, named in a series of inscriptions from the present site of Stanton Low, formerly part of Roman Britain.
- Gaius Avienus, named in an inscription from Florentia in Etruria.
- Sextus Avienus, named in an inscription from Hispalis in Hispania Baetica.
- Sextus Avienus, named in an inscription from Ameria, dating from the reign of Augustus.
- Titus Avienius, a cornicularius, or hornblower, buried at Rome.
- Sextus Avienius Sex. f. Sex. n. [...], the son of Sextus Avienius Livianus and Annia, buried in the family sepulchre at Ostia.
- Sextus Avienius Sex. f. Agathyrsus, the brother of Sextus Avienius Livianus, buried in the family sepulchre at Ostia.
- Sextus Avienus Calliclus, named in an inscription from Sulci in Sardinia, along with Aviena Philomena.
- Aviena Calliope, named in an inscription from Tucci in Hispania Baetica.
- Gaius Avienus C. l. Ciratus, a freedman named in an inscription from Rome.
- Sextus Avienus Dioscurides, buried at Tibur in Latium.
- Titus Avienus Eros, buried at Rome.
- Aviena Eucumene, buried at Rome, aged thirty, together with her brother, Avienius Georgus.
- Sextus Avienus Eudoxus, named in an inscription from Rome, dating to 2 BC.
- Sextus Avienius Felicior, the son of Avienia Flora, buried at Rome, aged sixteen years and eight days.
- Avienia Flora, the mother of Sextus Avienius Felicior, a young man buried at Rome.
- Avienia Sex. f. Sex. n. Flora, daughter of Sextus Avienius Livianus and Annia, buried in the family sepulchre at Ostia.
- Aviena P. l. Fausta, probably the freedwoman of Publius Avienus Primus, named in an inscription from Rome.
- Avienius Georgus, buried at Rome, aged eighteen, together with his sister, Avienia Eucumene.
- Sextus Avienius Sex. f. Her[...], the brother of Sextus Avienius Livianus, buried in the family sepulchre at Ostia.
- Sextus Avienus Heraclida, named in a list of members of the shipwrights' guild at Ostia, dating to the beginning of the third century.
- Sextus Avienius Sex. f. Livianus, one of the municipal Decurions at Ostia, built a family sepulchre for himself and his wife, Annia, children, Avienia Flora, Sextus Avienius Livianus Junior, Sextus Avienius [...], and brothers, Sextus Avienius Agathyrsus, Sextus Avienius Nico, and Sextus Avienius Her[...].
- Sextus Avienius Sex. f. Sex. n. Livianus Junior, son of Sextus Avienius Livianus and Annia, buried in the family sepulchre at Ostia.
- Sextus Avienius Sex. f. Nico, the brother of Sextus Avienius Livianus, buried in the family sepulchre at Ostia.
- Sextus Avienius Nico[...], named in a list of donors at Ostia, dating to AD 198.
- Avienius Ɔ. l. Nicomedes, a freedman, built a tomb at Rome for his patron.
- Sextus Avienius Onesiphorus, a member of the shipwrights' guild at Ostia in the beginning of the third century.
- Aviena Philista, named in an inscription from Rome, dating to the first half of the first century.
- Aviena Philomena, named in an inscription from Sulci, together with Sextus Avienus Calliclus.
- Publius Avienus Primus, probably the former master of Aviena Fausta, named in an inscription from Rome.
- Aviena Procula, dedicated a tomb at Rome to her husband, Felix, master of the imperial household.
- Quintus Avienus Pudens, dedicated a tomb at Ameria, dating to the latter half of the first century, to his wife, Nonia Saturnina.
- Avienus Quarte[...], named in a late second or third century inscription from Cumae in Campania.
- Sextus Avienus Sex. l. Secundus, a freedman, and the husband of Titia Aucta, with whom he was buried at Rome, aged thirty-five.
- Titus Avienus Tarentinus, buried at Rome.
- Avienia Sex. l. Thaïs, a freedwoman, built a family sepulchre at Rome.
- Titus Avenius Tiro, buried at Rome.
- Avienia Viontilla, together with her brother, Hyginus, dedicated a tomb at Rome to their father, Julius Atticus.
- Titus Avenius T. l. Zetus Eros, a freedman named in an inscription from Rome.
- Avienia Sex. f. Zosime, the daughter of Sextus Avienius Zosimus, for whom she built a tomb at Ostia.
- Sextus Avienius Zosimus, one of the Seviri Augustales at Ostia, buried in a tomb dedicated by his daughter, Avienia Zosime, dating to the late second or early third century.

== See also ==
- List of Roman gentes

== Bibliography ==
- Aulus Hirtius (attributed), De Bello Africo (On the African War).
- Theodor Mommsen et alii, Corpus Inscriptionum Latinarum (The Body of Latin Inscriptions, abbreviated CIL), Berlin-Brandenburgische Akademie der Wissenschaften (1853–present).
- Notizie degli Scavi di Antichità (News of Excavations from Antiquity, abbreviated NSA), Accademia dei Lincei (1876–present).
- René Cagnat et alii, L'Année épigraphique (The Year in Epigraphy, abbreviated AE), Presses Universitaires de France (1888–present).
- George Davis Chase, "The Origin of Roman Praenomina", in Harvard Studies in Classical Philology, vol. VIII, pp. 103–184 (1897).
- T. Robert S. Broughton, The Magistrates of the Roman Republic, American Philological Association (1952–1986).
- The Roman Inscriptions of Britain (abbreviated RIB), Oxford (1990–present).
- Olli Salomies, Adoptive and Polyonymous Nomenclature in the Roman Empire, Societas Scientiarum Fennica, Helsinki (1992).
