= Fabius Titianus =

Fabius Titianus was a Roman politician and senator in the fourth century AD.

== Career ==
Titianus had a long and successful career as an official; during his life he held many positions in the Empire, including the consulship.

Titianus served as Corrector of Picenum, Proconsul of the province of Sicily (dates unknown), and Proconsul of Asia (between 324 and 337 AD). In 337 AD, he was elected consul together with Flavius Felicianus as his colleague.

After the death of Constantine I, he continued to serve under Constantine's youngest son, Constans, serving as Urban Prefect of Rome from 339 to 341 AD. From 341 or 342 AD, until the end of Constans' reign in 350 AD, Titianus was Praetorian Prefect of Gaul.

He supported the rebellion of the usurper Magnentius, for which he was again appointed Urban Prefect of Rome, holding the office from 350 to 351 AD. Shortly before the Battle of Mursa, Titianus arrived at the court of Constantius II as the ambassador of Magnentius. He accused the Constantinian dynasty of allowing the destruction of cities through negligence and advised him to abdicate in favor of Magnentius. Constantius rejected the proposal, but Titianus was freely released back to Magnentius.

Titianus was known to have been a pagan. He was a Quindecimviri sacris faciundis in a priestly college.

== Sources ==
- Jones, A.H.M.; J.R. Martindale & J. Morris (1971). The Prosopography of the Later Roman Empire Volume 1: A.D. 260–395. Cambridge University Press. ISBN 0-521-07233-6.
