= Seria gens =

Ancient Roman family

The gens Seria was a minor plebeian family at ancient Rome. Members of this gens rose to prominence during the second century, attaining the consulship twice, and holding various other offices under the Nerva-Antonine dynasty.

== Branches and cognomina ==
The only distinct family of the Serii bore the cognomen Augurinus, borne by the consular family of the second century. This was one of a large class of surnames derived from occupations, and probably indicating that the first member of the family to acquire the name was an augur.

== Members ==
This list includes abbreviated praenomina. For an explanation of this practice, see filiation.

- Marcus Serrius, (Note: As with the senator Publius Serrius of 44 BC, this nomen Serrius here may be an error for Sergius.) a senator, and one of the witnesses of the Senatus Consultum de Agro Pergameno, concerning a dispute over the lands of Pergamum, in 129 BC.
- Publius Serrius, (Note: The nomen Serrius here may be a mistake for Sergius, and he is listed under that heading in PW.) one of the senators who in 44 BC witnessed a decree of the consuls Marcus Antonius and Publius Cornelius Dolabella, confirming the promises made by Caesar to the ambassadors of Hyrcanus, ethnarch of Judea. Caesar had promised to support Hyrcanus as ethnarch, and to respect the rights of the Jews to administer their cities, and maintain their religious rites and customs throughout Roman territory.
- Seria Maximilla, the former mistress of Titus Serius Alexander, for whom she dedicated a tomb at Pitinum in Umbria, dating between AD 50 and 200.
- Titus Serius Ɔ. l. Alexander, the freedman of Seria Maximilla, who dedicated a tomb at Pitinum, dating between AD 50 and 200.
- Gaius Junius Serius Augurinus, consul in AD 132, in office from the Kalends of January to the end of April.
- Gaius Serius Augurinus, one of the duumviri quinquennales at Rome in AD 132, he fourth year of the twenty-eighth lustrum.
- Gaius Serius C. f. Augurinus, consul in AD 156, probably serving for the first two months of the year. He was proconsul of Africa in 170.
- Gnaeus Serius C. f. C. n. Oppianicus Augurinus, one of the Salii Palatini in AD 181.
- Lucius Serius Niger, made an offering to Isis at Telesia in Samnium, recorded in a second-century inscription.
- Seria Expectata, buried in a second-century tomb at Reate in Samnium, with a monument from her husband, Gaius Spellius Fudidianus.
- Serius Callistus, dedicated a second- or third-century monument at Rome to his stepson, Serius Eutyches.
- Serius Eutyches, buried at Rome in the second or third century, with a monument from his father, Serius Callistus.
- Seria Corinthias, buried in a third-century tomb at Rome, aged twenty-one years, six months, and twenty days, with a monument from her husband, Petronius Severianus.
- Valerius Serius Serus, dedicated a monument at Rome for his wife, Flavia Pontia Januaria, dating to the end of the third century, or the first quarter of the fourth.

=== Undated Serii ===
- Serius, named along with Lucia, perhaps his wife, in a fragmentary inscription from Venetia and Histria.
- Serius, a little boy buried at Augusta Treverorum in Gallia Belgica, aged two years and three months, with a monument from his parents.
- Quintus Serius C. f., named in an inscription from Bononia in Cisalpine Gaul, along with Publius Serius Celer, possibly his son.
- Serius Augurinus, the son of Aelia Caecilia Philippa.
- Publius Serius Q. f. Celer, named in an inscription from Bononia, along with Quintus Serius, perhaps his father.
- Seria Fausta, named in an inscription from Mevania in Umbria.
- Seria Tigris, buried at Rome, with a monument from her husband.

== See also ==
- List of Roman gentes

== Bibliography ==
- Flavius Josephus, Antiquitates Judaïcae (Antiquities of the Jews).
- Theodor Mommsen et alii, Corpus Inscriptionum Latinarum (The Body of Latin Inscriptions, abbreviated CIL), Berlin-Brandenburgische Akademie der Wissenschaften (1853–present).
- Giovanni Battista de Rossi, Inscriptiones Christianae Urbis Romanae Septimo Saeculo Antiquiores (Christian Inscriptions from Rome of the First Seven Centuries, abbreviated ICUR), Vatican Library, Rome (1857–1861, 1888).
- Notizie degli Scavi di Antichità (News of Excavations from Antiquity, abbreviated NSA), Accademia dei Lincei (1876–present).
- René Cagnat et alii, L'Année épigraphique (The Year in Epigraphy, abbreviated AE), Presses Universitaires de France (1888–present).
- August Pauly, Georg Wissowa, et alii, Realencyclopädie der Classischen Altertumswissenschaft (Scientific Encyclopedia of the Knowledge of Classical Antiquities, abbreviated RE or PW), J. B. Metzler, Stuttgart (1894–1980).
- George Davis Chase, "The Origin of Roman Praenomina", in Harvard Studies in Classical Philology, vol. VIII, pp. 103–184 (1897).
- Paul von Rohden, Elimar Klebs, & Hermann Dessau, Prosopographia Imperii Romani (The Prosopography of the Roman Empire, abbreviated PIR), Berlin (1898).
- T. Robert S. Broughton, The Magistrates of the Roman Republic, American Philological Association (1952–1986).
- Robert K. Sherk, "The Text of the Senatus Consultum De Agro Pergameno", in Greek, Roman, and Byzantine Studies, vol. 7, pp. 361–369 (1966).
- Recueil des Inscriptions Chrétiennes de la Gaule (Record of Christian Inscriptions from Gaul), Paris (1975–present).
