= Reparatus =

Reparatus (died 539) was a Roman aristocrat, and politician under Ostrogothic rule. He held the offices of Urban prefect (527) and Praetorian prefect of Italy.

== Biography ==
Reparatus was the brother of Pope Vigilius; according to the Liber pontificalis, their father was Johannes and identified as a consul having received that title from the emperor. He was one of the senators taken hostage by Witigis in November/December 536, but managed to escape along with his fellow senator Vergentius (also known as Bergantinus) before the Ostrogoths ordered their slaughter in Spring 537, only to be trapped in Milan during the siege of that city in Summer 538 to March 539. While Reparatus was killed when the city fell, Vergentius managed to escape with his life and left Italy for Constantinople.

Responsibility for Reparatus' fatherless children fell to their uncle the Pope. Pope Vigilius married his niece, Vigilia, to Turcius Rufius Apronianus Asterius, the consul of 494, and provided for his nephew Rusticus by ordaining him as a deacon in the Roman church.
