= Oclatinia gens =

Ancient Roman family

The gens Oclatinia was an obscure Roman family of imperial times. It is best known from a single individual, Marcus Oclatinius Adventus, consul for the second time (Note: The date of his first consulate is not known.) in AD 218, together with the emperor Macrinus. From various sources, we know that he was procurator Augustorum under Septimius Severus in AD 202, and governor of Britain between 205 and 207.

== Origin ==
The nomen Oclatinius clearly shares a root with Oclatius, borne by Tiberius Oclatius Severus, consul suffectus in AD 160, and is perhaps an orthographic variant of Ocratius, part of a class of gentilicia formed using the suffix -atius, derived from place-names ending in -as or -atis, or passive participles ending in -atus.

== See also ==
- List of Roman gentes

== Bibliography ==
- Lucius Cassius Dio Cocceianus (Cassius Dio), Roman History.
- Herodianus, History of the Empire from the Death of Marcus.
- Theodor Mommsen et alii, Corpus Inscriptionum Latinarum (The Body of Latin Inscriptions, abbreviated CIL), Berlin-Brandenburgische Akademie der Wissenschaften (1853–present).
- George Davis Chase, "The Origin of Roman Praenomina", in Harvard Studies in Classical Philology, vol. VIII (1897).
- Paul von Rohden, Elimar Klebs, & Hermann Dessau, Prosopographia Imperii Romani (The Prosopography of the Roman Empire, abbreviated PIR), Berlin (1898).
