= Ceionius Rufius Albinus =

Roman senator

Ceionius Rufius Albinus (fl. 4th century) was a Roman senator who was appointed consul in 335.

== Life and career ==
Rufius Albinus was the son of Gaius Ceionius Rufius Volusianus who was consul in 311 and 314 before being exiled. In 335 Rufius Albinus was appointed consul posterior alongside Julius Constantius. Then from 30 December 335 until 10 March 337, he was praefectus urbi of Rome.

Rufius Albinus was referred to as philosophus, and may have been the author of works on logic and geometry. He may also have been the author of a history of Rome in verse. In around 337 the Senate issued a decree honouring him for his services with a statue.

Possibly married to Lampadia, they were perhaps the parents of Gaius Ceionius Rufius Volusianus Lampadius, praefectus urbi of Rome in 365.

== Sources ==
- Martindale, John R.; Jones, A. H. M.; Morris, John, eds. (1971). The Prosopography of the Later Roman Empire: Volume I, AD 260–395. Cambridge: Cambridge University Press. ISBN 0-521-07233-6.

Political offices
Preceded by Amnius Anicius Paulinus; Flavius Optatus	Roman consul 335 with Julius Constantius	Succeeded by Virius Nepotianus; Tettius Facundus
Preceded by Aurelius Hermogenes	Praefectus urbi of Rome; 335–337	Succeeded by Junius Flavianus
