= Turcius Rufius Apronianus Asterius =

Roman aristocrat

Turcius Rufius Apronianus Asterius (fl. AD 494) was a Roman aristocrat during the reign of Theodoric the Great. He held the consulship with Flavius Praesidius in 494, having been praefectus urbi of Rome before holding that honor.

== Works ==
One of the oldest texts of Vergil's works, the codex Mediceus (Florence Laur. 39.1 + Vatican lat. 3225, f.76), which was written in Italy in the fifth century, contains a subscription stating that it was corrected at Rome by Turcius Rufius Apronianus Asterius. As John Matthews notes, "Not only did Asterius thus record for posterity his literary work ... in an elegiac poem he also commemorated the consular games given by him (in 494) at great expense to his now slender fortune."

According to the Liber Pontificalis, enemies of Pope Vigilius claimed the pope married Asterius to his niece Vigilia, "then took an opportunity to have him arrested at night and beaten to death." However Jeffrey Richards strips the defamation from this claim, and explains that Vigilia was married to Asterius following her father Reparatus's death in 539 as a way to provide for her. According to Christian Settipani, it was in fact Asterius's namesake grandson who married Vigilia.

Preceded by Albinus; Eusebius	Roman consul 494 with Praesidius	Succeeded by Viator
