= Amnius Anicius Paulinus =

Roman politician

Amnius Manius Caesonius Nicomachus Anicius Paulinus signo Honorius fl. AD 334–335) was a politician of the Roman Empire.

== Biography ==
Paulinus probably was the son of Amnius Anicius Julianus, consul in 322, and the nephew of Sextus Anicius Paulinus, consul in 325. He was thus a member of the gens Anicia.

Paulinus was consul in 334 and praefectus urbi of Rome in 334–335. In 334, he erected an equestrian statue to emperor Constantine I in the Roman Forum. In turn, a statue was dedicated to him in the Forum of Trajan, the inscription of which celebrates Paulinus for "his high birth, his eloquence, his fairness, and his good judgment, for which he is renowned in private and in public".

== Family ==
Christian Settipani has tried to reconstruct Paulinus' familial bonds. According to Settipani, Paulinus was married to Pincia (born c. 305) or, perhaps more likely, to Auchenia. His wife was perhaps the daughter of Pincius (b. c. 280 and c.v. in the beginning of the 4th century) and wife Caeionia (b. 285 or 290), in turn perhaps the daughter of (Marcus) Caeionius Proculus, suffect consul of Rome in 289, and wife Alfenia Juliana.

They were perhaps the parents of Anicius Auchenius Bassus, praefectus urbi of Rome in 382.

== Sources ==
- PLRE II, "Paulinus 14".
- Christian Settipani, Les Ancêtres de Charlemagne (France: Éditions Christian, 1989).
- Christian Settipani, Continuite Gentilice et Continuite Familiale Dans Les Familles Senatoriales Romaines, A L'Epoque Imperiale, Mythe et Realite. Linacre, UK: Prosopographica et Genealogica, 2000. ILL. NYPL ASY (Rome) 03-983.
- Christian Settipani, Continuité gentilice et continuité familiale dans les familles sénatoriales romaines à l’époque impériale: Mythe et Réalité, Prosopographica et Genealogica vol. 2 (Linacre College, Oxford, 2000), Addenda et Corrigenda

Political offices
Preceded by Flavius Delmatius; Domitius Zenofilus	Roman consul 334 with Flavius Optatus	Succeeded by Julius Constantius; Ceionius Rufius Albinus
