= Sextus Anicius Paulinus =

Roman statesman and aristocrat

Sextus Anicius Paulinus (fl. 325–333) was an aristocrat of the Roman Empire. The offices he is known to have held were: Proconsul of Africa; consul with Julius Julianus as his colleague in 325; and praefectus urbi between 331 and 333.

A member of the gens Anicia, his father was probably Anicius Faustus and his brother was Amnius Anicius Julianus (consul of 322); Amnius Anicius Paulinus was probably his son or his grandson, or the son of his brother. Perhaps he is to be identified with that Anicius who was the first senator of that lineage to publicly convert to Christianity.

== Notes ==
Political offices
Preceded by Crispus Caesar III; Constantine Caesar III	Roman consul 325 with Valerius Proculus, Julius Julianus	Succeeded by Constantine Augustus VII; Constantius Caesar
