= Amnius Anicius Julianus =

Roman senator

Amnius Anicius Julianus (fl. 322–329) was a politician of the Roman Empire.

== Biography ==
Anicius Julianus was consul in 322 with Petronius Probianus, praefectus urbi Romae between 326 and 329.

He is identified with the proconsul of Africa who, in 302, received a rescript (an answer to a request for clarification that Julianus had sent) from emperor Diocletian, which ordered the suppression of the Manichees in Africa, accused of being in contact with the Sasanian Empire.

It has been proposed that the Julianus who was proconsul of Africa could have been active in 296–297 and that he was put to death by Maximian on fabricated treason charges; the rebel in Africa should be, therefore, linked to Sabinus Julianus, a usurper in Africa recorded in Aurelius Victor's Caesares 39.22.

== Family ==
Christian Settipani has tried to reconstruct Julianus' family ties. According to his studies, Julianus, probably born around 270, was the son of Anicius Faustus, consul in 298, and younger brother of Sextus Anicius Paulinus, consul in 325. Julianus married Caesonia Manilia (born c. 275), daughter of Lucius Caesonius Ovinius Rufinus Manilius Bassus (or Rufinius), consul in 280; they had a son, Amnius Manius Caesonius Nicomachus Anicius Paulinus Honorius, consul in 334.

== Bibliography ==
- Martindale, John R.; Jones, A. H. M.; Morris, John, eds. (1971). "Iulianus 23". The Prosopography of the Later Roman Empire: Volume I, AD 260–395. Cambridge: Cambridge University Press. pp. 473–474. ISBN 0-521-07233-6.
- Christian Settipani, Les Ancêtres de Charlemagne (France: Éditions Christian, 1989).
- Settipani, Continuite Gentilice et Continuite Familiale Dans Les Familles Senatoriales Romaines, A L'Epoque Imperiale, Mythe et Realite. Linacre, UK: Prosopographica et Genealogica, 2000. ILL. NYPL ASY (Rome) 03-983.
- Settipani, Continuité gentilice et continuité familiale dans les familles sénatoriales romaines à l’époque impériale: mythe et réalité, Prosopographica et Genealogica vol. 2 (Linacre College, Oxford, 2000), Addenda et Corrigenda

Political offices
Preceded by Crispus Caesar II; Constantine Caesar II	Roman consul 322 with Petronius Probianus	Succeeded by Acilius Severus; Vettius Rufinus
