= Gaius Vettius Cossinius Rufinus =

Gaius Vettius Cossinius Rufinus (fl. 306 – 316) was a politician and senator of the late Roman Empire.

In 306 he was made proconsul of Achaea, but Maxentius' revolt in Rome prevented Rufinus from taking up the post, since Maxentius did not have jurisdiction in Achaea. He was curator (i.e., official in charge of maintenance) of the via Flaminia, of the Tiber riverbed and of Rome's drains, corrector, or governor, of Regio X Venetia et Histria, the province of Diocletian that covered Tuscia Umbria and Campania, all under Maxentius.

Wanting to gain the Roman Senate's support, Constantine honoured Rufinus despite his having been a supporter of his rival Maxentius and made him comes Augusti nostri (i.e., to Constantine's colleague in the east, Licinius). Three senators were elected praefectus urbi under Constantine, including Rufinus from 20 August 315 to 4 August 316. Constantine was sure enough of Rufinus' loyalty that he sent him to the east under the authority of Licinius. Rufinus also became consul for 316.

Political offices
Preceded by Constantine, Licinius	Consul of the Roman Empire; 316	Succeeded by Ovinius Gallicanus, Caesonius Bassus
Preceded by Gaius Caeionius Rufius Volusianus	Praefectus urbi 20 August 315 - 4 August 316	Succeeded by Ovinius Gallicanus
