= Aurelius Anicius Symmachus =

Roman politician and aristocrat

Aurelius Anicius Symmachus (fl. 415–420) was a politician of the Western Roman Empire belonging to the Roman families of the Anicii and of the Symmachi. In 415 he was proconsul of Africa and between 24 December 418 and January 420 he was praefectus urbi of Rome.

== Biography ==
He belonged to the Roman families of the Anicii and of the Symmachi; he was probably a relative of Quintus Aurelius Symmachus, perhaps the son of a brother or sister who had married a member of Anicii. In 415 he was proconsul of Africa; he obtained, in this capacity, the right to receive appeals.

Between 24 December 418 and January 420 he was praefectus urbi of Rome; in this capacity he wrote to the court regarding issues related to succession to Pope Zosimus, who had died two days after the beginning of Symmachus' office. He also restored a market in Ostia and one of the Roman forums.

== Bibliography ==
- Martindale, John R., ed. (1980). "Aurelius Anicius Symmachus 6". The Prosopography of the Later Roman Empire: Volume II, AD 395–527. Cambridge: Cambridge University Press. pp. 1043–1044. ISBN 0-521-20159-4.
