= Petronius Probinus (consul 341) =

Petronius Probinus (fl. 341 – 346 AD) was an aristocrat and statesman of the Roman Empire. He was Roman consul in the year 341 and praefectus urbi of Rome from July 345 to December 346.

== Biography ==
Probinus was the son of Petronius Probianus, a consul and praefectus urbi, and was from the gens Petronia, an influential patrician family that provided several high-ranking officers for the imperial administration between the 4th and 5th centuries AD. Probinus himself was consul in 341 and praefectus urbi of Rome from July 5, 345, to December 26, 346.

His wife was, according to Drinkwater and Elton, "Claudia"/"Clodia", a sister of Clodius Celsinus Adelphus, who in turn was married to his sister Faltonia Betitia Proba, one of the most influential Roman Christian poets during Late Antiquity.

== Issue ==
He had a son, Sextus Claudius Petronius Probus, consul in 371 and four-time Praetorian prefect. His grandchildren include Anicius Probinus and Anicius Hermogenianus Olybrius consuls of 395, and the consul of 406, Anicius Probus. The aristocrat Anicia Faltonia Proba was his grand-niece - and his daughter in law.

== Sources ==
- Martindale, John R.; Jones, A. H. M.; Morris, John, eds. (1971). The Prosopography of the Later Roman Empire: Volume I, AD 260–395. Cambridge: Cambridge University Press. p. 735. ISBN 0-521-07233-6.

Political offices
Preceded by Septimius Acindynus, Lucius Aradius Valerius Proculus	Consul of the Roman Empire; 341 with Antonius Marcellinus	Succeeded by Flavius Iulius Constantius Augustus III, Flavius Iulius Claudius Constans Augustus II
