= Cento Vergilianus de laudibus Christi =

Latin poem arranged by Faltonia Betitia Proba

- by Faltonia Betitia Proba
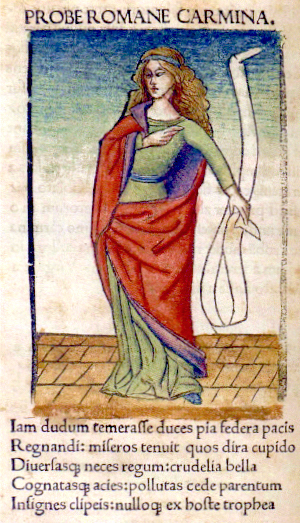
- The first five lines of De laudibus Christi with a depiction of the author, Faltonia Betitia Proba, holding a scroll
- Written: Fourth-century AD
- Country: Roman Empire
- Language: Latin
- Subject(s): Christianity, the Old and New Testaments
- Genre: Cento
- Meter: Dactylic hexameter

Cento Vergilianus de laudibus Christi (Latin: [ˈkɛntoː wɛrɡɪlɪˈaːnʊs deː ˈlau̯dɪbʊs ˈkʰriːstiː]; A Virgilian Cento Concerning the Glory of Christ) (Note: The poem is also known as De laudibus Christi (Latin: [deː ˈlau̯dɪbʊs ˈkʰriːstiː]; Concerning the Glory of Christ) and Cento Probae (Latin: [ˈkɛntoː ˈproːbae̯]; The Cento of Proba).) is a Latin poem arranged by Faltonia Betitia Proba (c. AD 352–384) after her conversion to Christianity. A cento is a poetic work composed of verses or passages taken from other authors and re-arranged in a new order. This poem reworks verses extracted from the work of Virgil to tell stories from the Old and New Testament of the Christian Bible. Much of the work focuses on the story of Jesus Christ.

While scholars have proposed a number of hypotheses to explain why the poem was written, a definitive answer to this question remains elusive. Regardless of Proba's intent, the poem would go on to be widely circulated, and it eventually was used in schools to teach the tenets of Christianity, often alongside Augustine of Hippo's De doctrina Christiana. But while the poem was popular, critical reception was more mixed. A pseudonymous work purportedly by Pope Gelasius I disparaged the poem, deeming it apocryphal, and many also believe that St. Jerome wrote negatively of Proba and her poem. Other thinkers like Isidore of Seville, Petrarch, and Giovanni Boccaccio wrote highly of Proba, and many praised her ingenuity. During the 19th and 20th centuries the poem was criticized as being of poor quality, but recent scholars have held the work in higher regard.

== Origin and style ==
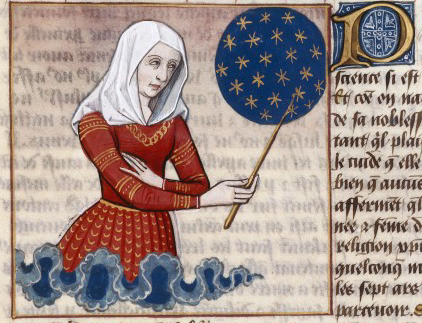
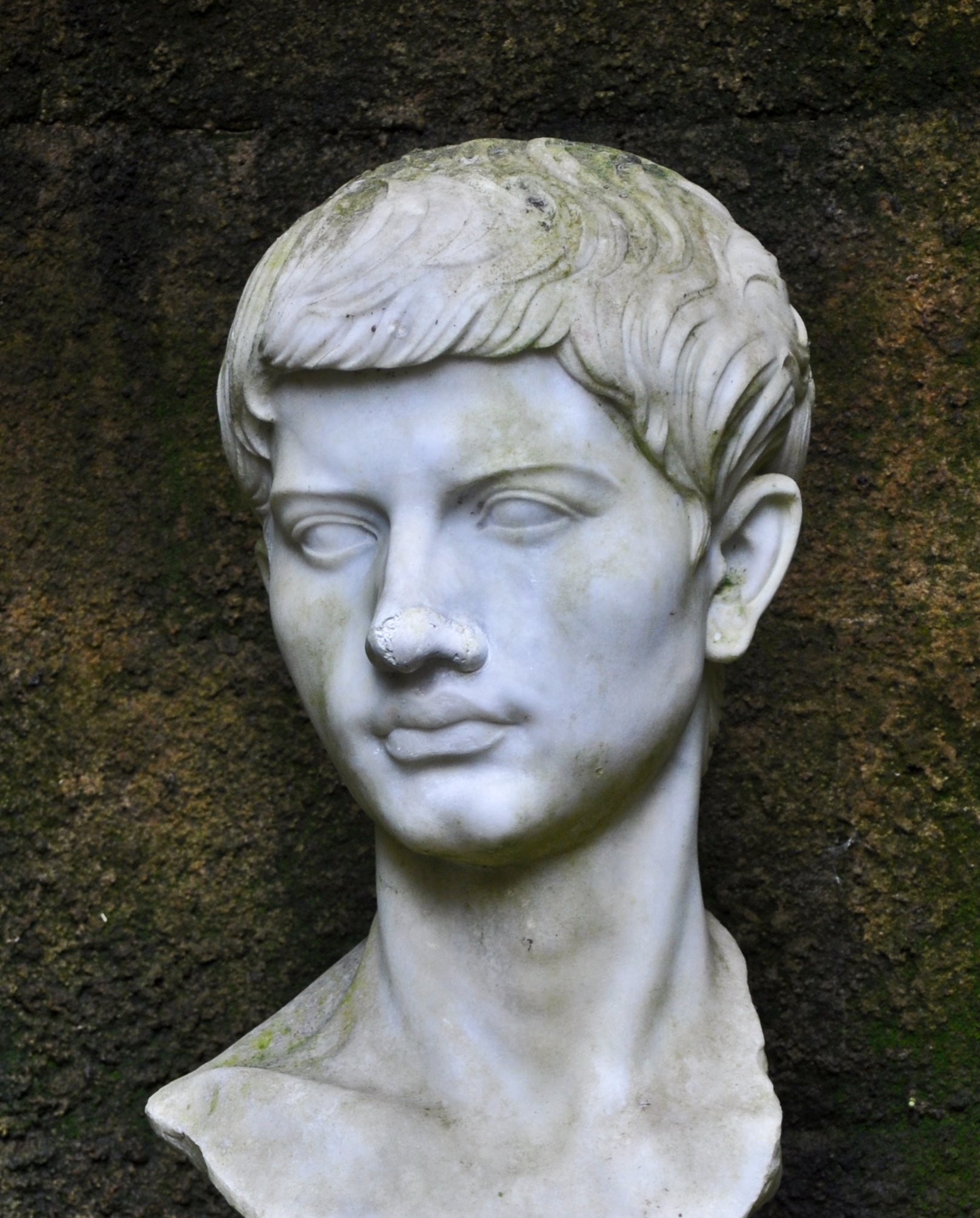
Cento Vergilianus de laudibus Christi was arranged by Faltonia Betitia Proba (left) almost entirely from the works of the Roman poet Virgil (right).

The author of the poem, Faltonia Betitia Proba, was born c. AD 322. A member of an influential, aristocratic family, she eventually married a prefect of Rome named Clodius Celsinus Adelphius. Proba wrote poetry, and according to contemporary accounts, her first work was titled Constantini bellum adversus Magnentium; this poem, which is now lost, recounted the war between Roman Emperor Constantius II and the usurper Magnentius that occurred between AD 350–53. At some point, Proba converted from paganism to Christianity, and De laudibus Christi, which was probably written c. AD 352–384, was her attempt to "turn away from battle and slayings in order to write holy things".

With the exception of the proem and invocation of the poem, (Note: The proem and invocation are both mixes of original Latin lines and lines borrowed from or alluding to Virgil, the Silver Age poet Lucan, and the fourth-century poet Juvencus.) the entirety of De laudibus Christi is a cento (i.e. a patchwork poem) made up of rearranged lines and half-lines (Note: For example, Proba's line 127, "omnipotens genitor / costas et viscera nudat," referring to the creation of Eve from Adam's rib (Genesis 2:21), pieces together half of Aen. 10.668 (Turnus' address to Jupiter) and 1.211 (the butchering of Aeneas' seven stags).) extracted from the works of the Roman poet Virgil. (Note: Ausonius (AD 310–395) is the only poet from Antiquity to comment on the form and content of the Virgilian cento, and his statements are regarded as authoritative by many scholars. Ephraim Chambers, in his Cyclopædia (1728), paraphrases Ausonius statements as such: A cento "may be taken either from the same poet, or from several. The verses may be either taken entire[ly], or divided into two, one half to be connected to another half taken elsewhere. But two verses should never be us[e]d running, nor much less than half a verse be taken.") Proba's choice of Virgil seems to have been made for two reasons: First, Virgil was an influential poet who had been commissioned by Caesar Augustus, the first Roman emperor, to write the mytho-historical epic Aeneid. Arguably the most influential Roman poet, Virgil's artistic clout was immense, being felt well into late antiquity, and he was imitated by Late Latin poets like Juvencus and Prudentius. The respect given to Virgil often manifested in the form of centos, which reached peak popularity in the fourth century AD. Second, Virgil was often seen as a proto-Christian prophet due to a popular interpretation of his fourth Eclogue, which many believed foretold the birth of Jesus.

Hardly any names are present in De laudibus Christi. This is because Virgil never used Hebrew names like "Jesus" and "Mary", and thus Proba was limited in terms of what she was able to work with. To compensate, Proba used vague words like mater ("mother"), pater ("father"), deus ("god"), and vates ("poet" or "priest") to refer to key Judeo-Christian figures. In places, this handicap interferes with readability (according to G. Ronald Kastner and Ann Millin, "Necessary passives and circumlocutions brought about by the ... absences in [Virgil] of appropriate terminology render the text impassable at times"). An exception to the poem's lack of names is found in a reference to Moses, whom Proba refers to by invoking the name "Musaeus". According to the classicist Sigrid Schottenius Cullhed, "Proba [probably] used the name Musaeus for the Judeo-Christian prophet, since it was often believed from the Hellenistic era onward that Mousaios was the Greek name for Moses".

== Contents ==
=== Summary ===
But baptised, like the blest, in the Castalian font—
I, who in my thirst have drunk libations of the Light—
now begin my song: be at my side, Lord, set my thoughts
straight, as I tell how Virgil sang the offices of Christ.

— De laudibus Christi, ll. 20–23, translated by Josephine Balmer

The cento's 694 lines are divided into a proem and invocation (lines 1–55), select stories from the Old Testament books of Genesis (lines 56–318) and Exodus (lines 319–32), select stories from the New Testament Gospels (lines 333–686), and an epilogue (lines 687–94). At the beginning of the poem, Proba references her earlier foray into poetry before rejecting it in the name of Christ. This section also serves as an inversion and thus rejection of the Virgilian tradition: whereas Virgil opened the Aeneid by proclaiming that he will "sing of weapons and a man" (arma virumque cano), Proba rejects warfare as a subject worthy of Christian poetry. Proba then describes herself as a prophet (vatis Proba) and calls upon God and the Holy Spirit (eschewing the traditional invocation of the Muses) to aid her in her work. At the end of the invocation, Proba states her poem's main purpose: to "tell how Virgil sang the offices of Christ."

The passages focusing on the Old Testament concern the creation of the world, the Fall of Man, the Great Flood, and the Exodus from Egypt. Proba's presentation of the Creation—largely based on rewordings of Virgil's Georgics—reorganizes the Genesis narrative to better align it with contemporary Greco-Roman beliefs about the origin of the world. Cullhed argues that certain aspects of the creation story are "abbreviated ... amplified or even transposed" so that Proba can avoid repetitive passages, such as the double creation of man (Genesis 1:25–27 and Genesis 2:18–19). In the events leading to the Fall of Man, Eve's actions are largely based on the story of Dido from Book IV of the Aeneid, thereby "repeatedly foreshadowing ... the imminent disaster of the Fall". The Serpent is described with lines that detail Laocoön's death (from Book II, Aeneid) and the snake sent by the fury Alecto to enrage Amata (from Book VII, Aeneid). Proba relies on the first two books of the Georgics (specifically, the sections that discuss the Iron Age of Man) to describe human life after Adam and Eve eat the fruit from the tree of the knowledge of good and evil; in this way, she connects the Greco-Roman concept of the Ages of Man with the Judeo-Christian concept of the Fall of Man.

After the story of Creation, Proba briefly references the Great Flood by making use of lines from the fourth book of the Georgics that originally discussed the death of a beehive and the necessity of laws after the end of the Golden Age, respectively. According to the classicist Karla Pollmann, by using lines that concern destruction and the establishment of law, Proba is able to convey the traditional idea that Noah's survival represents the dawning of a "second creation and a new order" (that is, the Patriarchal age). Proba dedicates only a few lines to Exodus before moving onto the New Testament. Cullhed reasons that this is because the Book of Exodus and the remaining Old Testament is replete with violence and warfare that is stylistically too close to the tradition of pagan epic poetry—a tradition that Proba expressly rejects in the proem of De laudibus Christi. In the transitional section between the Old and New Testaments, Proba appropriates the invocation of the Muses of war that immediately precedes the Catalogue of Italians (from Book VII, Aeneid) and verses that originally described Aeneas's prophetic shield (from Book VIII, Aeneid). According to Culhed, these verses originally functioned as poetic devices, enabling Virgil to move from the "Odyssean" first half of the poem to the "Iliadic" latter half. Proba likewise has re-purposed these verses to aid in her transition from the Old Testament into the New.

The portion of De laudibus Christi that focuses on the New Testament recounts the birth of Jesus, his life and deeds, his crucifixion, and the advent of the Holy Spirit. Although Jesus and Mary are featured, Joseph is omitted. Jesus is often described by language befitting a Virgilian hero, and Mary is depicted by lines originally relating to Venus and Dido. Proba's Sermon on the Mount begins by borrowing the Sibyl of Cumae's description of punishment for the unrighteous (from Book VI, Aeneid), and some scholars contend that this portion of De laudibus Christi is the first description of hell in Christian poetry. Christ's deeds are reduced to three events: calming the sea, walking on water, and the call of the disciples. To describe Christ's crucifixion, Proba uses several lines that originally related to warfare, destruction, and death, such as the battle between Aeneas and the Rutuli (from Book XII, Aeneid), the Sack of Troy (from Book II), and the suffocation of Laocoön by giant serpents (from Book II). Notably, Christ is crucified not on a cross, but an oak tree, which Cullhed argues "synthesizes Jewish, Roman and Christian religious codes", as the species of tree was associated in the Greco-Roman world with Jupiter, and in the Judeo-Christian tradition with the Binding of Isaac. After covering Christ's death, Proba borrows lines referring to the erotic love between Dido and Aeneas to represent the decidedly more spiritual love that Christ shares with his disciples. The end of the poem focuses on Christ describing the world to come and his ascension into Heaven; Proba conveys the former via the prophecy made by both Celaeno and the Oracle of Delos (both from Book III, Aeneid), and the latter with language that originally described the god Mercury.

=== Characterization of Jesus ===
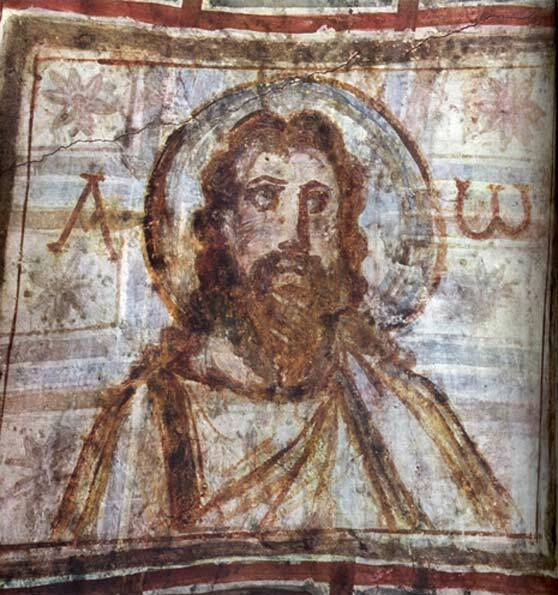
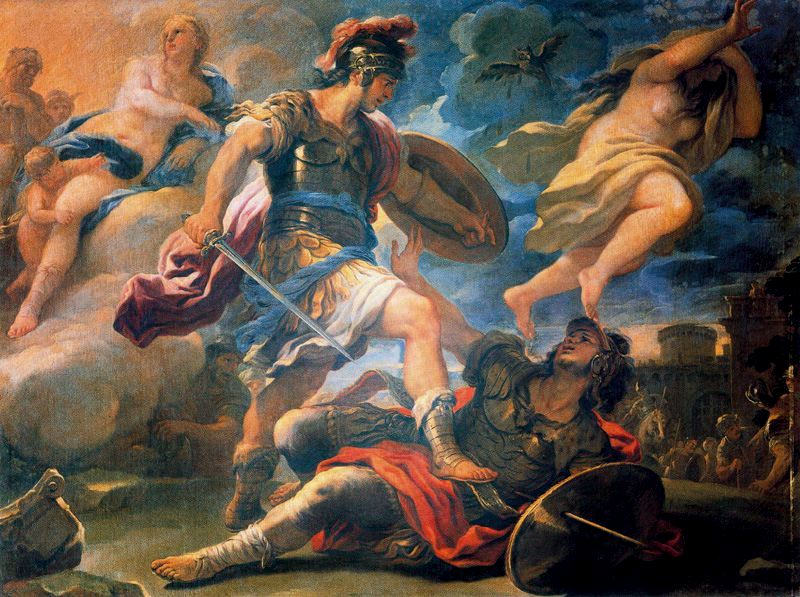
In the cento, Jesus (left) is described in language befitting a Virgilian hero like Aeneas (right).

Due to her borrowing from Virgil, Proba's Christ is very similar to the Virgilian epic hero. Parallels between the two include both seeking a goal greater than their own happiness, initiating realms "without end", and projecting auras of divinity. According to the early Christian specialist Elizabeth A. Clark and the classicist Diane Hatch, Proba's purpose was to "imbue the Christ with heroic virtues" akin to the Virgilian hero. The poet does this in three major ways: First, she describes Jesus as remarkably beautiful, with "a magnificent and commanding presence" similar to that of Aeneas. Second, during the Crucifixion, Jesus does not go meekly to his death, but aggressively lashes out at his persecutors. Her reconfiguration of Jesus's crucifixion is thus in line with Aeneas' vindictive slaying of Turnus described at the very end of the Aeneid. Finally, Proba transfers to Jesus portions of prophecies scattered throughout the Aeneid that detail Rome's glorious future, thus recasting pagan oracles in a Christian light.

=== Characterization of Mary ===
The characterization of Mary has caused much scholarly debate. The historian Kate Cooper sees Mary as a courageous, intelligent materfamilias. Clark and Hatch write that Proba stresses Mary's maternity by omitting Joseph and presenting Mary as Jesus's sole human parent. Conversely, the Latinist Stratis Kyriakidis argues that despite Mary's presence in the poem, she lacks feminine attributes, and is thus "impersonal". According to Kyriakidis, this is intentional on Proba's part, as it draws attention to Christ's divinity—an aspect that "would be incompatible with a human, feminine mother."

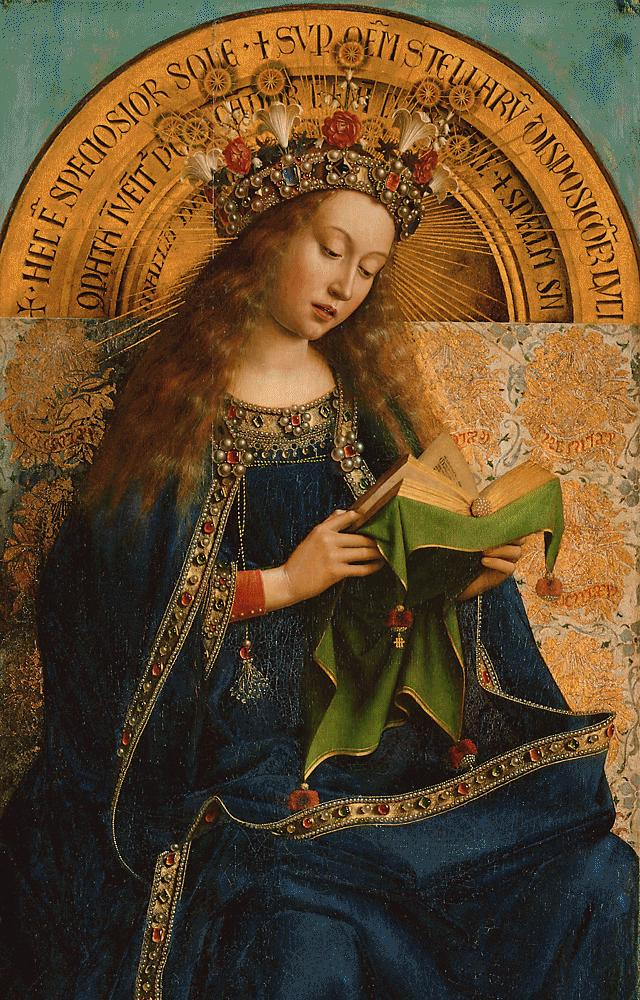
According to Sigrid Schottenius Cullhed, Proba compares Mary (pictured) to goddesses and prophets through the use of Virgilian language.

Cullhed writes that the most scholarly views of Mary in the poem are inadequate, and that Proba made Mary "the twofold fulfillment and antitype of both Eve and Dido." Cullhed bases this on the fact that line 563 of the fourth book of the Aeneid (from Mercury's speech to Aeneas, in which the god admonishes the hero for lingering with Dido in Carthage) is used in two of the sections of the cento: once, in which Adam admonishes Eve for sinning, and again, in which Mary learns that Herod wants to kill her child. According to Cullhed, the "negative characterization" of the original verse and its reuse in the Old Testament portion of the cento is transformed into a "positively charged ability" allowing Mary and Jesus to escape Herod's wrath. Because Mary can foretell the future, she is compared (through the use of Virgilian language) to Greco-Roman goddesses and prophets.

== Proba's character and motivation ==
Because historical information about Proba is limited, many scholars have taken to analyzing De laudibus Christi to learn more about her. According to the classicist Bernice Kaczynski, "Scholars have seen traces of Proba's own character in her emphasis on the beauty of the natural world, readily apparent in her account of the creation." The cento suggests that Proba had great regard for "domestic matters, for marriage and the family, for marital devotion and [for] filial piety". While the New Testament stresses asceticism, Proba seems to de-emphasize its importance, given that topics like virginity and poverty are not stressed in her poem. In regards to issues of finance, Proba reinterprets a number of the New Testament episodes in which Jesus urges his followers to eschew wealth as passages suggesting that Christians should simply share wealth with their families. These changes illustrate Proba's historical context, her socio-economic position, and the expectations of her class.

As to why Proba arranged in the poem in the first place, scholars are still divided. The Latinist R. P. H. Green argues that the work was a reaction to the Roman emperor Julian's law forbidding Christians from teaching literature that they did not believe to be true (which is to say, classical Greek and Latin mythology). Proba's goal, Green writes, was to present Virgil "without [pagan] gods, and [thus] a [Virgil] no longer vulnerable to Christian criticism". In this way, a Christian teacher could use the text to discuss Virgil without compromising their religious and moral integrity. Clark and Hatch, on the other hand, postulate that Jesus's Virgilian nature in the cento may have been Proba's attempt to rebut the unflattering, demonizing descriptions of Jesus in Julian's Caesares and Contra Galilaeos. They conclude that the hypothesis is intriguing but unverifiable due to the lack of information about Proba, the date of the cento's creation, and her intentions. Finally, the classicist Aurelio Amatucci suggests that Proba composed the cento to teach her children stories from the Bible, although there is no solid evidence that the poem was ever intended to be a teaching tool.

== Reception ==
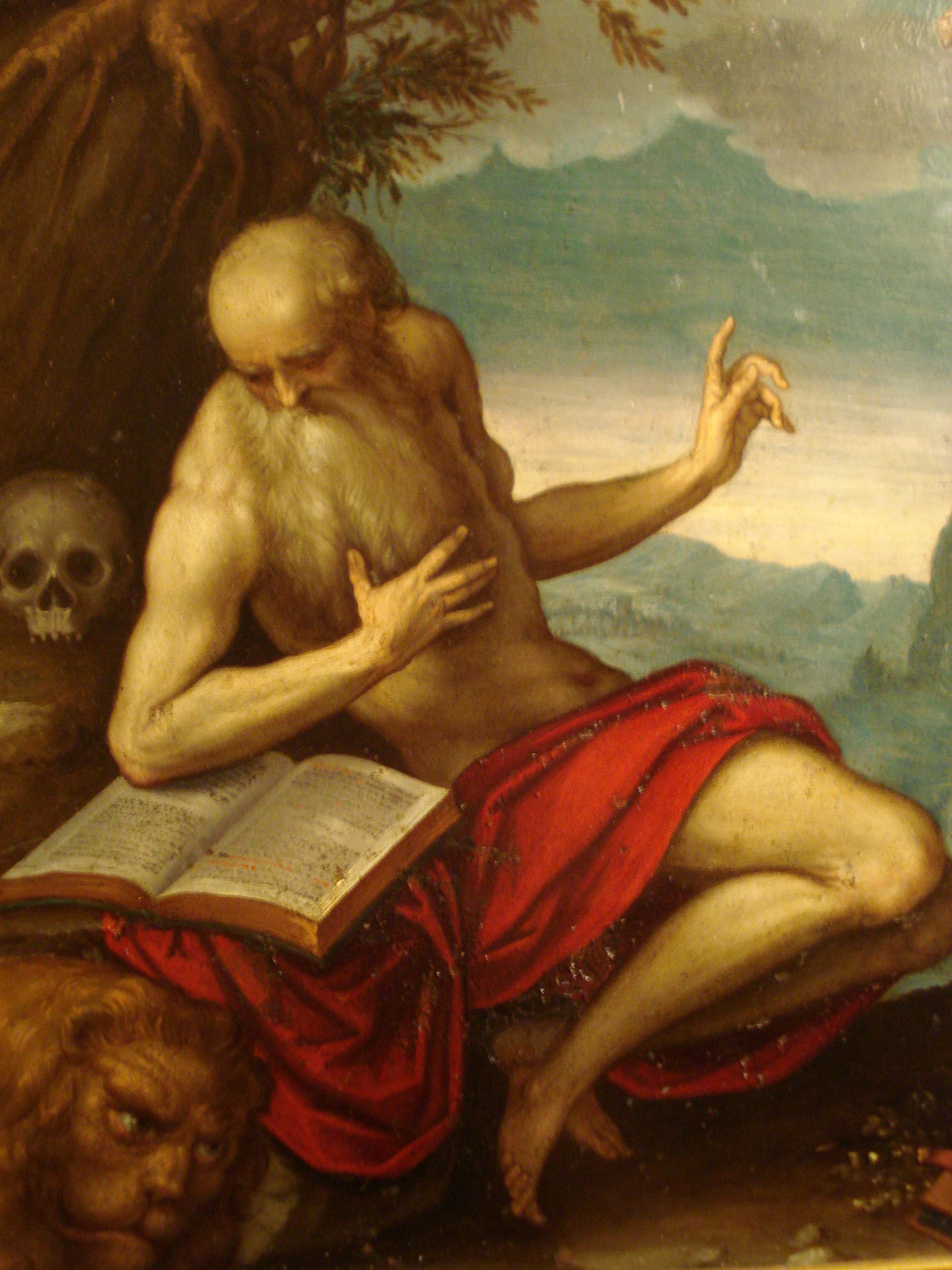
Many scholars believe that Jerome (pictured) criticized the poem.

In the late-4th and early-5th centuries, the work began to receive a more mixed response. Many scholars hold that the Church Father Jerome was a critic of the work; in a letter written from Bethlehem to Paulinus of Nola castigating Virgilian centos, he warned against following an "old chatterbox" (garrula anus) and those who think of calling "the Christless Maro [i.e. Virgil] a Christian" (non ... Maronem sine Christo possimus dicere Christianum). (Note: Alessia Fassina proposed that the garrula anus referred to by Jerome was actually Melania the Elder, and Sigrid Schottenius Cullhed hypothesizes that Jerome is not talking about any one person, but rather the type of person not fit to preach the Gospel. Cullhed nevertheless concedes that "the majority of scholars believe that 'this babbling old lady' must refer to none other than Proba".) According to the historian James Westfall Thompson, Jerome "strongly inveighed against this method of destroying the sense of a pagan author", and that "his love of the classics and his Christian piety were alike offended" by Proba's actions. (Note: Ironically, in the Medieval period—because Faltonia Betitia Proba was often confused with her granddaughter Anicia Faltonia Proba and because Jerome praised Anicia Proba in a letter to Demetrias—De laudibus Christi was sometimes called "The cento of the illustrious poet Proba Faltonia, approved of by divine Jerome".) Conversely, Roman Emperor Arcadius (who reigned from AD 395–408) received a copy of the poem, and his version has a fifteen-line dedication contending that Proba's work is "Maro changed for the better in sacred meaning" (Maronem mutatum in melius divino ... sensu). The work was also presented to Empress Aelia Eudocia, the wife of Byzantine Emperor Theodosius II (who reigned from AD 408–450).

During late antiquity, a pseudonymous document known as the Decretum Gelasianum—which was long believed to have been issued by Pope Gelasius I (who held the papacy from AD 492–496)—declared De laudibus Christi to be apocryphal and a "reprehensible work of poetry". But almost a century later, Archbishop Isidore of Seville (AD 560–636) called Proba the "only woman to be ranked among the men of the church" (Proba ... femina inter viros ecclesiasticos ... posita sola). In regards to De laudibus Christi, Isidore wrote that "it is not the work which should be admired, but [Proba's] ingenuity" in compiling the poem (Cuius quidem non miramur studium sed laudamus ingenium).

During the Renaissance, Proba and her work were praised as examples of studiousness and scholarship. In a 1385 letter to Anna von Schweidnitz (the wife of the Holy Roman Emperor Charles IV), the Italian poet and scholar Petrarch referenced Proba and her work while discussing female geniuses, and in 1374 the humanist Giovanni Boccaccio included Proba in his biographical collection of historical and mythological women entitled De mulieribus claris. In 1474, the poem was published by the Swiss printer Michael Wenssler, which likely made Proba the first female author to have had her work reproduced by a printing press. In 1518, Proba's work was once again being used in an educational setting, this time by John Colet of St Paul's School, who believed that Proba "wrote ... wysdom with clene and chast Latin".

Scholarship in the 19th and early 20th century was more critical of De laudibus Christi. Some classicists and philologists of the era cite the work as an example of late antiquity's "poverty of ideas". In 1849, William Smith's Dictionary of Greek and Roman Biography and Mythology called the poem "trash" worthy of "no praise", and in 1911, P. Lejay of The Catholic Encyclopedia wrote that "the action of the poem is constrained and unequal, the manner absurd, [and] the diction frequently either obscure or improper". Despite these rather negative appraisals, contemporary scholars have taken a renewed interest in the poem, and many see it as worthy of study. (Note: For instance: Green argues that "a Vergilian cento [i.e. De laudibus Christi] has suffered unjustified neglect from scholars", Kaczynski calls the work "remarkable" and "the most successful Christian" cento, and Cullhed notes that the works "position in the tradition between Virgil and the Bible [as well as] its radical technique of literary imitation and female author-function ... renders the reception of the Cento a rewarding field of study.") Cullhed, in particular, considers the work "of considerable historical and cultural importance [for] it belongs to the small number of ancient texts with a female author and stands out as one of our earliest extant Christian Latin poems." The first English-language work dedicated in its entirety to Proba and her poem was the 2015 monograph, Proba the Prophet, written by Cullhed.

== Authorship controversy ==
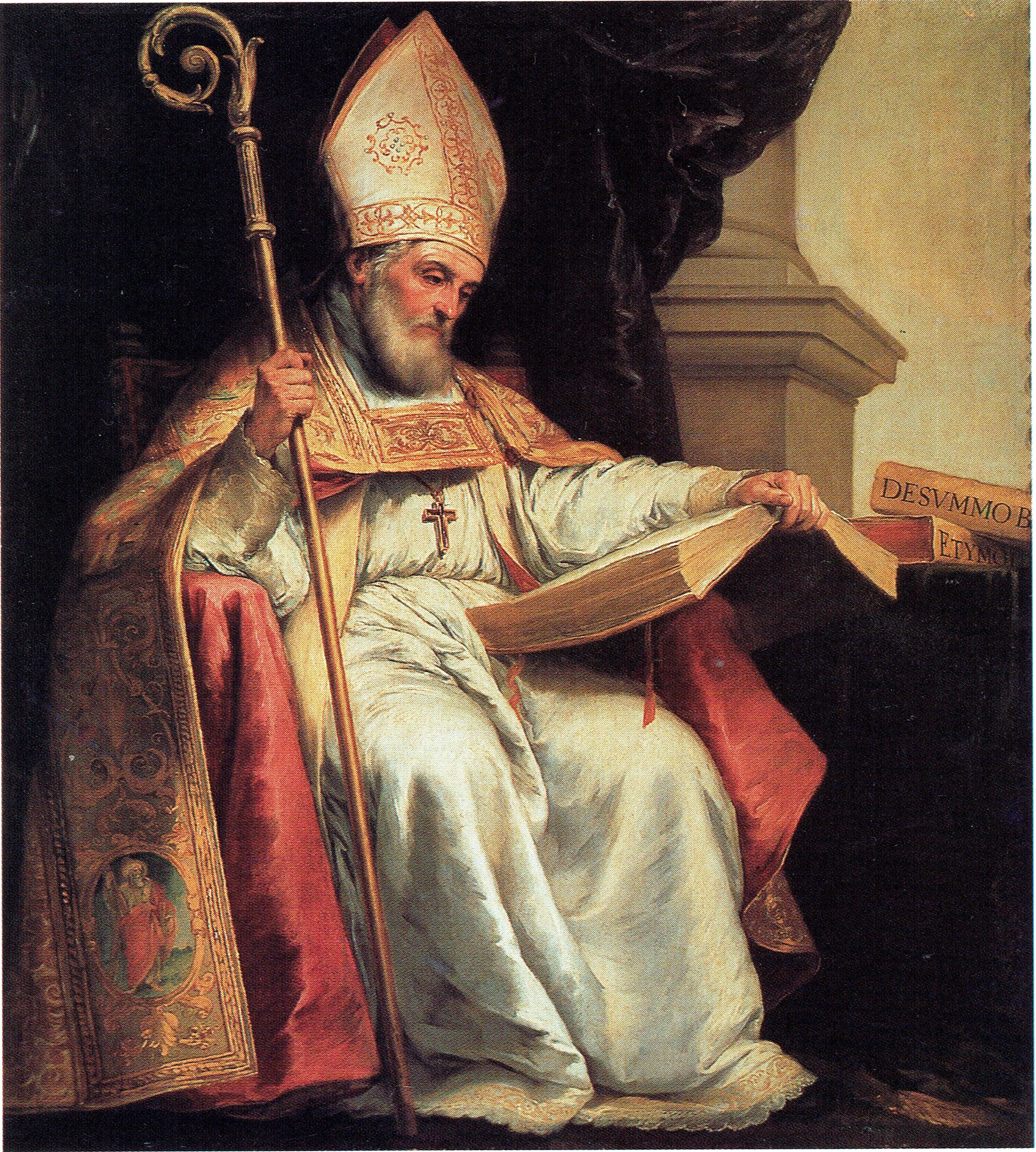
Isidore of Seville (pictured) identified Faltonia Betitia Proba as the poem's author in his 7th-century work Etymologiae.

The poem is traditionally attributed to Faltonia Betitia Proba largely on the assertion of Isidore, who wrote in his Etymologiae that De laudibus Christi was the product of a woman named Proba who was the wife of a man named Adelphus (Proba, uxor Adelphi, centonem ex Vergilio ... expressit). But the classicist and medievalist Danuta Shanzer has argued that the poem was not the work of Faltonia Betitia Proba, but rather her granddaughter, Anicia Faltonia Proba, who lived in the late-fourth and early-fifth centuries. Shanzer—who is of the opinion that Faltonia Betitia Proba likely died in AD 351—bases much of her assertion on supposed date inconsistencies and anachronisms within the text. For instance, Shanzer points out that lines 13–17 of De laudibus Christi strongly resemble lines 20–24 of the poem Carmen contra paganos, which was written sometime after Faltonia Betitia Proba's death. Shanzer also claims that De laudibus Christi alludes to a notable debate about the date of Easter that took place in AD 387, thereby suggesting that the poem must date from the latter part of the fourth century. Finally, Shanzer argues that the reference to the war between Magnentius and Constantius in the work's proem precludes the possibility that Faltonia Betitia Proba arranged De laudibus Christi, due to the fact that the war took place in the same year as her supposed death. Shanzer rounds out her hypothesis by also invoking a textual argument, noting that the author of De laudibus Christi is often referred to in later manuscripts by titles that only Anicia Proba would have received, such as "mother of the Anicians" or the "eminent Roman Mistress".

In her 2015 book Proba the Prophet, Cullhed counters Shanzer's claims, first by noting that there is no definitive evidence that Faltonia Betitia Proba died in AD 351 and that such an assertion remains speculative at best. Cullhed also argues that "there are no 'grounds for determining priority'" of the poem's opening lines, and that the supposed reference to the AD 387 debate about Easter could have likely referred to an earlier, perhaps less famous dispute. As to the titles found in later manuscripts, Cullhed writes that it is likely that they were erroneously inserted during the Middle Ages by scribes who had understandably confused the two Probas. Cullhed also reasons that if Anicia Proba had written De laudibus Christi, the Latin poet Claudian would have almost certainly praised her poetic abilities in his AD 395 panegyric celebrating the joint consulship of her sons Anicius Hermogenianus Olybrius and Anicius Probinus. Cullhed concludes: "The evidence for discrediting Isidore's attribution [of Faltonia Betitia Proba as the author of the cento] is not sufficient, and so, I will assume that the cento was written in the mid-fourth century by Faltonia Betitia Proba." Today, the general consensus among classicists and scholars of Latin is that De laudibus Christi was indeed written by Faltonia Betitia Proba.

== See also ==
- Interpretatio Christiana, the adaptation of non-Christian elements of culture or historical facts to the worldview of Christianity

== Bibliography ==
- Balmer, Josephine (1996). Classical Women Poets. Hexham, UK: Bloodaxe Books. ISBN 978-1-85224-342-5.
- Chambers, Ephraim, ed. (1728). "Cento". Cyclopædia, or an Universal Dictionary of Arts and Sciences. Vol. 1. J. and J. Knapton. p. 180. Archived from the original on 2008-12-02.
- Clark, Elizabeth; Hatch, Diane (1981). "Jesus as Hero in the Vergilian 'Cento' of Faltonia Betitia Proba". Vergilius (27): 31–39. JSTOR 41591857.
- Comparetti, Domenico (1895). Vergil in the Middle Ages. Translated by E. F. M. Benecke. London, UK: Swan Sonnenschein & Co.
- Cooper, Kate (2007). The Fall of the Roman Household. Cambridge, UK: Cambridge University Press. ISBN 978-1-139-46910-4.
- Copeland, Rita, ed. (2016). The Oxford History of Classical Reception in English Literature: 800–1558, Volume 1. Oxford, UK: Oxford University Press. ISBN 978-0-19-958723-0.
- Cox, Virginia (2008). Women's Writing in Italy, 1400–1650. Baltimore, MD: Johns Hopkins University Press. ISBN 978-0-8018-8819-9.
- Cullhed, Sigrid Schottenius (2015). Proba the Prophet. Mnemosyne Supplements. Vol. 378. Leiden, The Netherlands: Brill Publishers. doi:10.1163/9789004289482. ISBN 978-90-04-28948-2.
- Fassina, Alessia (2004). Una Patrizia Romana al Servizio della Fede: Il Centone Cristiano di Faltonia Betitia Proba (Dissertation thesis). Ca' Foscari University of Venice.
- Green, R. P. H. (1995). "Proba's Cento: Its Date, Purpose, and Reception". The Classical Quarterly. 45 (2): 551–563. doi:10.1017/S0009838800043627. JSTOR 639543. S2CID 163022254.
- Harich-Schwarzbauer, Henriette (2006). "Proba". In Cancik, Hubert; Schneider, Helmuth; Salazar, Christine; Landfester, Manfred; Gentry, Francis (eds.). Brill's New Pauly. doi:10.1163/1574-9347_bnp_e1009090.
- Jensen, Anne (1996). God's Self-Confident Daughters. Louisville, Kentucky: Westminster John Knox Press. ISBN 978-0-664-25672-2.
- Kaczynski, Bernice (2013). "Faltonia Betitia Proba: A Vergilian Cento in Praise of Christ". In Churchill, Laurie; Brown, Phyllis; Jeffrey, Jane (eds.). Women Writing Latin. Abingdon-on-Thames, UK: Routledge. pp. 131–149. ISBN 978-1-136-74291-0.
- Kastner, G. Ronald; Millin, Ann (1981). "Proba". In Wilson-Kastner, Patricia (ed.). A Lost Tradition: Women Writers of the Early Church. Washington, D.C: University Press of America. pp. 33–44. ISBN 978-0-8191-1642-0.
- Lejay, P. (1911). "Faltonia Proba". The Catholic Encyclopedia. New York City, NY: Robert Appleton Company – via New Advent.
- McGill, Scott (2005). Virgil Recomposed: The Mythological and Secular Centos in Antiquity. Oxford, UK: Oxford University Press. pp. 2–5. ISBN 978-0-19-803910-5.
- Plant, Ian, ed. (2004). "Proba (About AD 322–70)". Women Writers of Ancient Greece and Rome: An Anthology. Norman, Oklahoma: University of Oklahoma Press. pp. 170–188. ISBN 978-0-8061-3621-9.
- Pollmann, Karla (2017). The Baptized Muse: Early Christian Poetry as Cultural Authority. Oxford, UK: Oxford University Press. ISBN 978-0-19-103995-9.
- Smith, William, ed. (1849). "Falconia [sic] Proba". Dictionary of Greek and Roman Biography and Mythology. Vol. 2. London, UK: Spottiswoode and Company. p. 134.
- Stevenson, Jane (2005). Women Latin Poets: Language, Gender, and Authority, from Antiquity to the Eighteenth Century. Oxford, UK: Oxford University Press. ISBN 978-0-19-818502-4.
- Thompson, James (1906). "Vergil in Mediaeval Culture". The American Journal of Theology. 10 (4): 648–662. doi:10.1086/478640. JSTOR 3154430.
- Worth, Roland H. (2012). Shapers of Early Christianity: 52 Biographies, A.D. 100–400. Jefferson, North Carolina: McFarland & Company. ISBN 978-0-7864-8228-3.
- Ziolkowski, Jan; Putnam, Michael, eds. (2008). The Virgilian Tradition: The First Fifteen Hundred Years. New Haven, Connecticut: Yale University Press. ISBN 978-0-300-10822-4.
