= Anicia =

Anicia may refer to:

- The gens Anicia, a plebeian family in ancient Rome

- Anicia Faltonia Proba (died in 432), Roman noblewoman
- Anicia Juliana (462 – 527/528), Roman imperial princess

- Anicia Peters (born 1972), Namibian computer scientist
- Euphydryas anicia, a species of butterfly in the Nymphalidae family also known as the anicia checkerspot

== See also ==
- Anycia (born 1997), American rapper
