= Horti Aciliorum =

Coordinates: 41.9125°N 12.4864°E

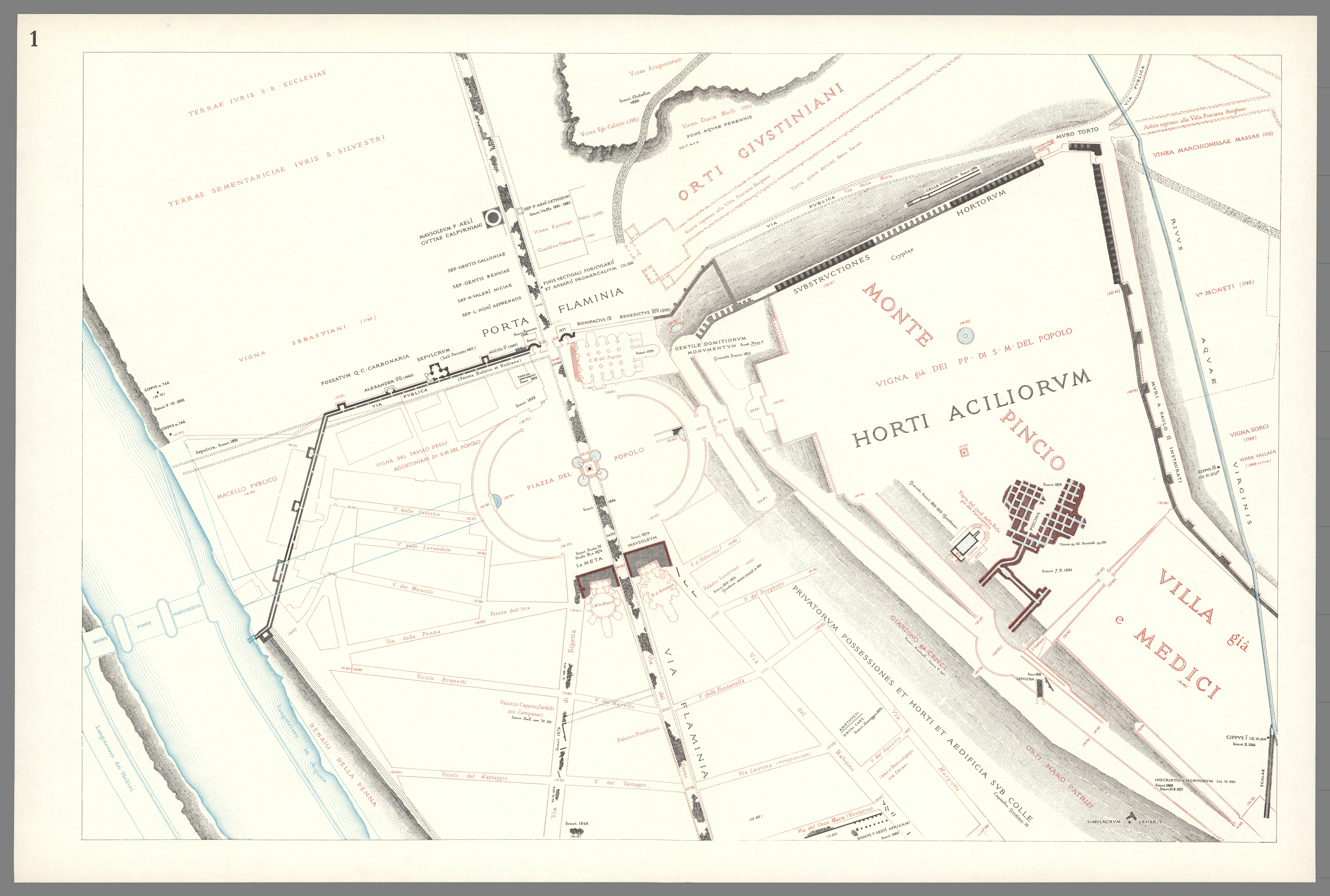
Map from Forma Urbis Romae (Lanciani)

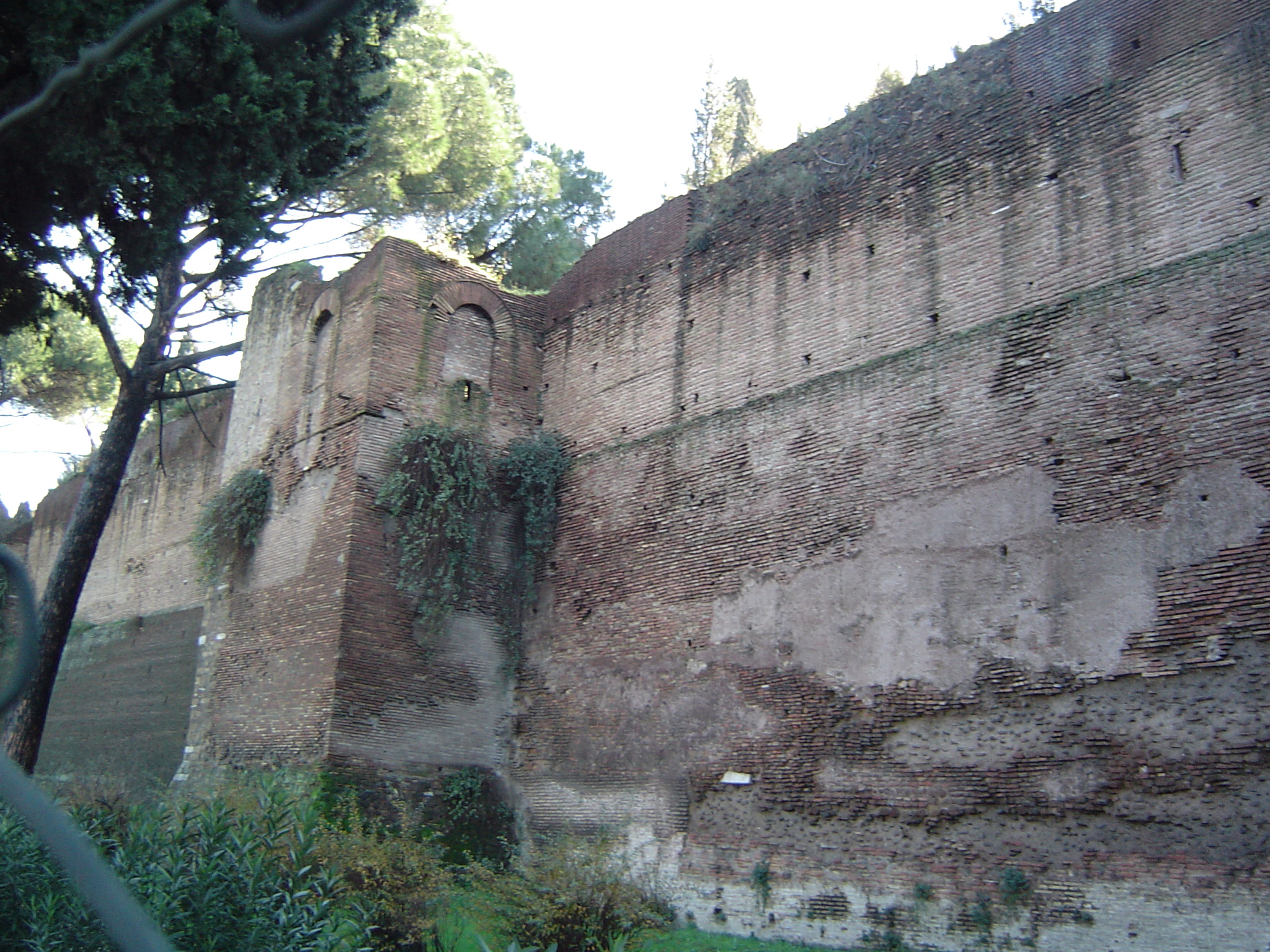
Section of the Aurelian Wall near the Muro Torto – originally the retaining wall north of the Horti Aciliorum

The Horti Aciliorum was a luxurious villa-estate in the city of Rome, created in the 2nd century AD on the Pincian Hill, between the Porta Pinciana and what is now the Spanish Steps.

== History ==
Surrounded to the north, west, and east by opus reticulatum retaining walls built along the slopes of the hill, the northern and eastern walls were later incorporated into the Aurelian Walls and so can be partially reconstructed. The northern part is the famous 'Muro Torto'. It was shaped as a wide semicircle, opening to the west, with a staircase leading down to the plain below to the north of the present-day Spanish Steps. It included a two-section piscina (swimming pool) connected to a cistern, consisting of a maze of small tunnels dug into the rock – the hill in the gardens of the current Villa Medici was built on the ruins of the 'Parnassus', an octagonal nymphaeum.

The gardens belonged to the Anicii Glabriones, who had them built. In the 4th century, they passed to the gens Pincia, then to Anicia Faltonia Proba and her husband Sextus Petronius Probus, before finally becoming state property.

== See also ==
- Roman gardens
