= Clodius =

Historiography of the Roman name, with list of historic and legendary examples

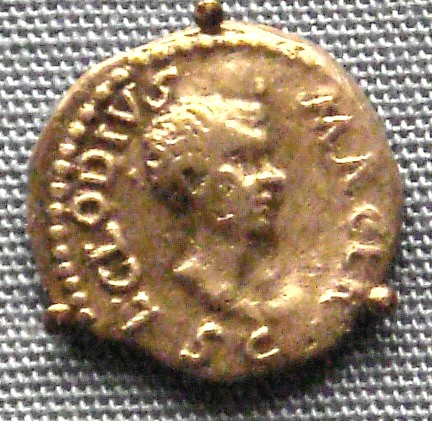
Denarius issued for the anti-Neronian rebel Clodius Macer in 68 AD

Clodius is an alternate form of the Roman nomen Claudius, a patrician gens that was traditionally regarded as Sabine in origin. The alternation of o and au is characteristic of the Sabine dialect. The feminine form is Clodia.

== Republican era ==
=== Publius Clodius Pulcher ===
Publius Clodius Pulcher (c. 92 – 18 January 52 BC) was a Roman politician and demagogue. A noted opponent of Cicero, he was responsible during his plebeian tribunate in 58 BC for a massive expansion of the Roman grain dole as well as Cicero's exile from the city. Leader of one of the political mobs in the 50s, his political tactics – combining connections throughout the oligarchy with mass support from the poor plebs – made him a central player in the politics of the era.

Born to the influential patrician gens Claudia, he was embroiled early in his political career in a religious scandal which saw him develop a rivalry with the orator Cicero and become a plebeian in order to be eligible for the plebeian tribunate. He successfully stood as tribune of the plebs for 58 BC and passed six laws to restore Rome's collegia (private guilds and fraternities), expand the grain dole (making it free rather than subsidised while also using those collegia as means for distribution), annex Cyprus to pay for the dole, clarify augural law on religious obstruction, make it more difficult for the censors to expel senators from the senate, and exile Cicero for the unlawful execution of conspirators during the Catilinarian conspiracy.

When curule aedile in 56 BC, he feuded with and attempted to prosecute his political enemy, Titus Annius Milo, who controlled a rival set of urban mobs. Starting the year an opponent of Caesar, Pompey, and Crassus, he and his family reconciled with them to form a political alliance. A few years later in 52 BC, amid renewed political violence and a campaign for the praetorship, Milo and Clodius encountered each other on the via Appia outside Rome, where Clodius was killed. His body, brought back to Rome, was brought to the forum and then cremated in the senate house, causing its destruction by fire.

His politics were advanced largely by his cultivation of urban mobs in Rome which, by exercising violent control of the places where the republic operated, furthered his political objectives. These violent tactics, however, were not his only sources of influence: his family connections and nobilitas made him a valuable ally to many parties – including, at various times, Caesar, Cato, and Pompey – in the ad hoc factionalism of the late republic. The older view that Clodius acted as an agent of magnates, such as Caesar or Pompey, is now rejected by scholars; he is now seen as an opportunistic and independent politician.

=== Other Clodii of the Republic ===
In addition to Clodius, Clodii from the Republican era include:

- Gnaeus Cornelius Lentulus Clodianus, presumably a "Clodius" before his adoption
- Clodius Aesopus, a tragic actor in the 50s BC who may have been a freedman of one of the Clodii Pulchri.
- Claudia, daughter of Clodius Pulcher and Fulvia, the first wife of emperor Augustus.
- Clodia, sister of Publius Clodius Pulcher, sometimes identified in Catullus' poems as "Lesbia".

Women of the Claudii Marcelli branch were often called "Clodia" in the late Republic.

== Imperial era ==
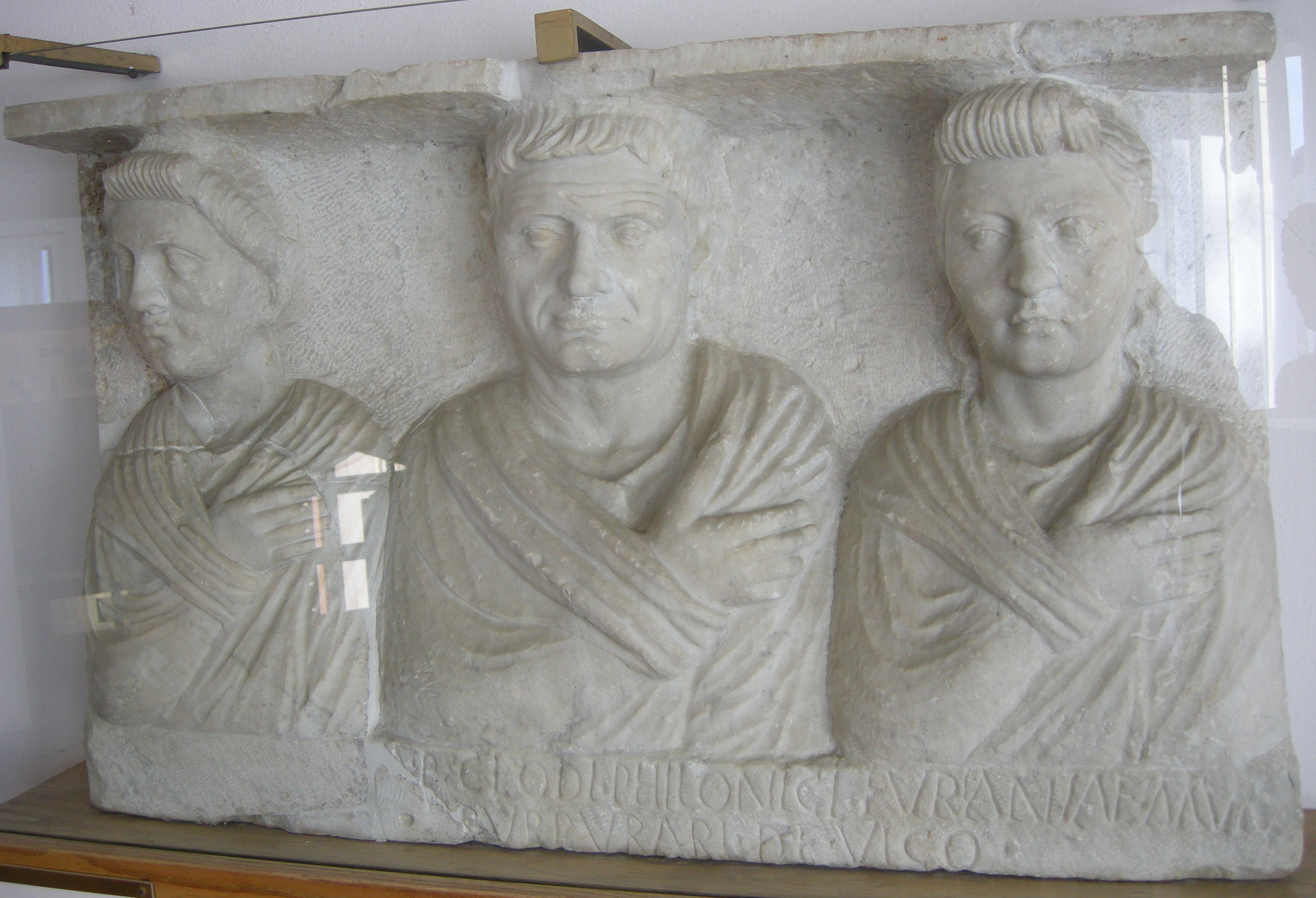
Funerary relief for Publius Clodius Philonicus, 70–100 AD

People using the name Clodius during the period of the Roman Empire include:

- Gaius Clodius Licinus, consul suffectus in AD 4.
- Gaius Clodius Vestalis, possible builder of the Via Clodia
- Publius Clodius Thrasea Paetus, senator and philosopher during the reign of Nero
- Lucius Clodius Macer, a legatus who revolted against Nero
- Publius Clodius Quirinalis, from Arelate in Gaul, teacher of rhetoric in time of Nero
- Decimus Clodius Septimius Albinus, commonly known as Clodius Albinus, rival emperor 196–197
- Marcus Clodius Pupienus Maximus, known as Pupienus, co-emperor 238
- Titus Clodius Pupienus Pulcher Maximus, son of emperor Pupienus and suffect consul c. 235

=== Clodii Celsini ===
The Clodii Celsini continued to practice the traditional religions of antiquity in the face of Christian hegemony through at least the 4th century, when Clodius Celsinus Adelphius (see below) converted. Members of this branch include:

- Quintus Fabius Clodius Agrippianus Celsinus, proconsul of Caria in 249 and the son of Clodius Celsinus (b. ca. 185); see for other members of the family.
- Clodius Celsinus Adelphius, praefectus urbi in 351.
- Quintus Clodius Hermogenianus Olybrius, consul 379

== See also ==
- Clodio the Longhair, a chieftain of the Salian Franks, sometimes called "Clodius I"
- Leges Clodiae, legislation sponsored by Clodius Pulcher as tribune

== Bibliography ==
- Chilver, Guy Edward Farquhar; Lintott, Andrew (2012). "Clodius Pulcher, Publius". Oxford Classical Dictionary (4th ed.). Oxford University Press. doi:10.1093/acrefore/9780199381135.013.1686.
- Tatum, W. Jeffrey (1999). The Patrician Tribune: Publius Clodius Pulcher. Studies in the history of Greece and Rome (Paperback ed.). University of North Carolina Press. ISBN 978-0-8078-7206-2. LCCN 98-37096.
