= Sextus Claudius Petronius Probus =

Roman aristocrat and statesman

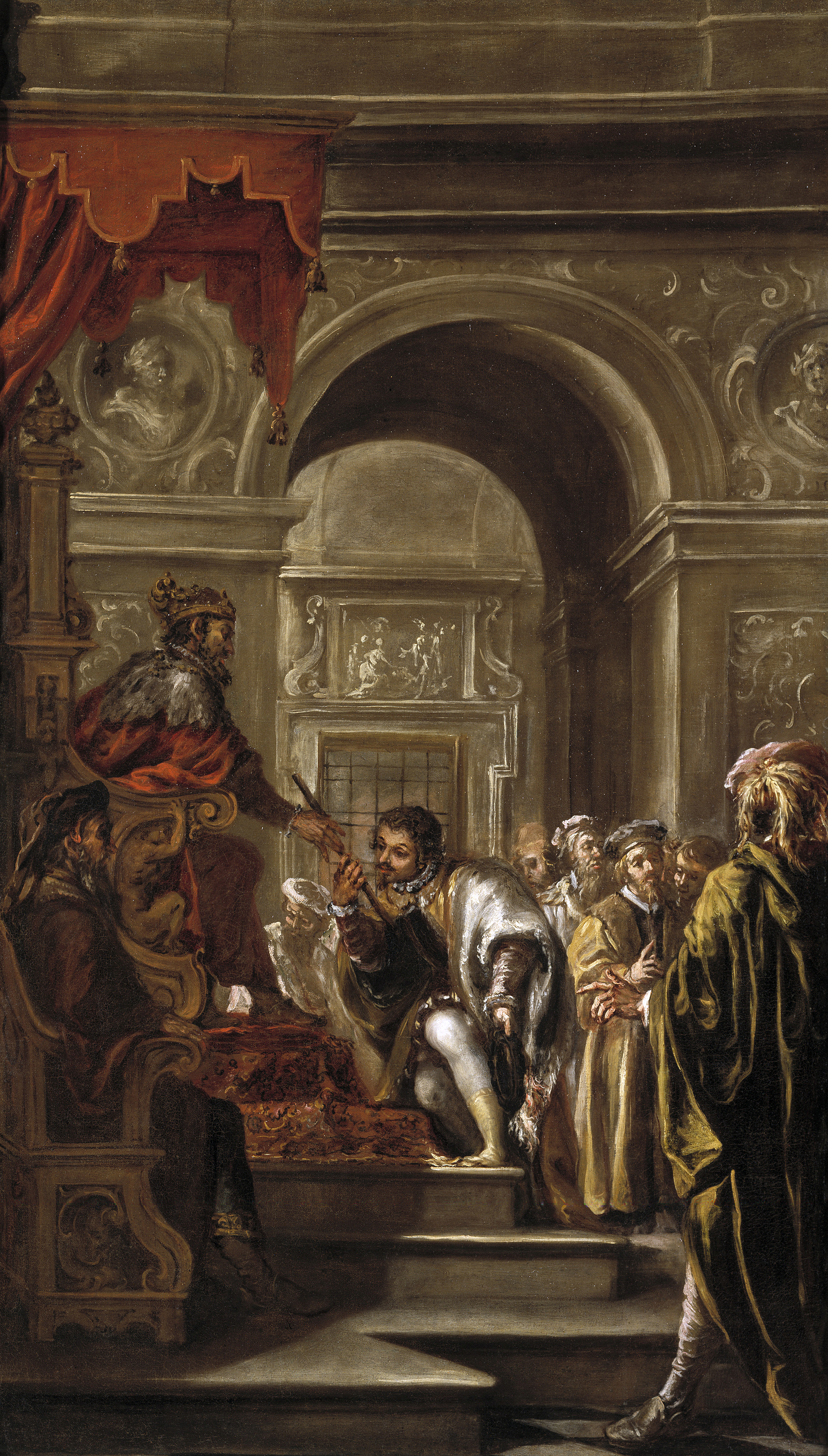
Consul Sextus Claudius Petronius Probus appoints St. Ambrose of Milan governor of Liguria and Emilia (Juan de Valdés Leal, c.1673)

Sextus Claudius Petronius Probus (c. 328–390) was a leading Roman aristocrat of the later 4th century AD, renowned for his wealth, power and social connections. The son of the consul Petronius Probinus, he married Anicia Faltonia Proba and had two sons. He had a successful political career, becoming praefectus urbanus, Proconsul of Africa, four times praetorian prefect, and consul alongside the emperor Gratian. His grandson and great-grandson went on to become emperors.

== Family ==
A Christian and a scion of the powerful Anician family from Verona, he married Anicia Faltonia Proba, the daughter of his first cousin Quintus Clodius Hermogenianus Olybrius, by whom he had two sons, Anicius Probinus and Anicius Hermogenianus Olybrius. Through his sons, Probus was the paternal ancestor of two emperors, Petronius Maximus and Olybrius.

According to the family tree published by Mommaerts and Kelley, Probus was a son of Petronius Probinus, consul in 341, and "Claudia"/"Clodia", a sister of Clodius Celsinus Adelphius. Faltonia Betitia Proba, a Christian poet, was sister to this Probinus and wife of Adelphius. Hermogenianus was a son of Proba and Adelphius. The elder Probinus and Proba were children of Petronius Probianus, consul in 322. Mommaerts and Kelley consider his wife to be an "Anicia", a sister to Amnius Anicius Julianus. Claudia and Adelphius were children of Clodius Celsinus and Demetrias. The eldest Probianus was a son of Petronius Annianus, consul in 314. Mommaerts and Kelley consider his wife to be "Proba", a daughter of emperor Probus. Probus was married to her first cousin once removed on her father's side Anicia Faltonia Proba (ca 365 - 410–432), daughter of Quintus Clodius Hermogenianus Olybrius and wife Turrenia Anicia Juliana or Anicia Faltonia Proba, by whom he had three sons, Anicius Probinus, Anicius Hermogenianus Olybrius and Anicius Petronius Probus.

== Career ==
Probus' career was one of the most noteworthy in his age. He began as quaestor, and then became praefectus urbanus. He was Proconsul of Africa in 358 and then Praetorian prefect four times: of Illyricum in 364, of Gaul in 366, of Italy, Illyricum, and Africa in 368-375 and again in 383–384; in the meantime, he held the consulship in 371, with Emperor Gratian as colleague.

In 372 he defended Sirmium against barbarian attack and in that same year he proclaimed Ambrose governor of Aemilia et Liguria. In 375 Probus was accused of corruption and oppression in extorting taxes for Valentinian I. In the same year when Valentinian I died, he was one of the generals who elevated the emperor's second son Valentinian II as Augustus and continued to serve under him, following him at the Eastern court when Magnus Maximus rebelled in the West.

His date of death is unknown, though he was still living in 390 when, according to the Vita Ambrosii of Paulinus of Milan, two Persian noblemen presented themselves before Theodosius I at Mediolanum but departed the next day for Rome in order to see for themselves Petronius Probus.

== Tomb ==
Petronius Probus was buried in a mausoleum built for him by his wife Anicia Faltonia Proba on the Vatican Hill. As the most prestigious burial place beside Saint Peter's tomb in Old St Peter's Basilica had already been occupied by the sarcophagus of Probus's predecessor, the consul and praefectus urbanus Junius Bassus, Probus's mausoleum was constructed immediately outside the western apse of the basilica. Probus was interred at St Peter's many decades before the first pope buried there – Pope Leo I – was interred in 461, and in a position closer the apostle's tomb than was possible for the imperial Mausoleum of Honorius, attached to the basilica's southern transept in the early 5th century for the burials of the Theodosian dynasty.

The mausoleum of Probus and his wife Proba was destroyed around 1450 during the demolition of Old St. Peter's Basilica. The sarcophagus of Probus was used as the baptismal font in St. Peter's Basilica from 1507 to 1699. It depicts the Traditio Legis ("Giving of the Law") scene.

== Fame ==
On various inscriptions, Probus is described as "the summit of the Anician house" (Aniciae domus culmen), "most learned in all subjects" (omnibus rebus eruditissimus) and "the acme of the nobility, the light of literature and eloquence" (nobilitatis culmen, litterarum et eloquentiae lumen). These phrases suggest he was a patron of literature, including of the poet Ausonius. His two sons Probinus and Olybrius continued the tradition by being the patrons of Claudian, who paints a flattering picture of Probus in his Panegyricus dictus Probino et Olybrio consulibus written to celebrate his sons' joint consulship in 395.

Ammianus Marcellinus portrays him as a vain and rapacious man who "owned estates in every part of the empire, but whether they were honestly come by or not is not for a man like me to say". Ammianus adds that Probus was one who was benevolent to his friends and a pernicious schemer against his enemies, servile to those more powerful than him and pitiless to those weaker, who craved office and exercised enormous influence through his wealth, always insecure and petty even at the height of his power.

== Bibliography ==
- Alchermes, Joseph D. (1995). "Petrine Politics: Pope Symmachus and the Rotunda of St. Andrew at Old St. Peter's". The Catholic Historical Review. 81 (1): 7–8. ISSN 0008-8080. JSTOR 25024438.
- Drinkwater, John; Elton, Hugh (2002). Fifth-Century Gaul: A Crisis of Identity?. Cambridge University Press. ISBN 978-0521529334.
- Martindale, John R.; Jones, A. H. M.; Morris, John, eds. (1971). The Prosopography of the Later Roman Empire: Volume I, AD 260–395. Cambridge: Cambridge University Press. pp. 736–740. ISBN 0-521-07233-6.
- McEvoy, Meaghan (2013). "The Mausoleum of Honorius: Late imperial Christianity and the city of Rome in the fifth century". In McKitterick, Rosamond; Osborne, John; Richardson, Carol M.; Story, Joanna (eds.). Old Saint Peter's, Rome. Cambridge University Press. p. 130. ISBN 978-1-107-72963-6.
- Salzman, Michele Renee (2002). The Making of a Christian Aristocracy: Social and Religious Change in the Western Roman Empire. Harvard University Press. ISBN 978-0-674-01603-3. JSTOR j.ctvk12r62.
- Schmidt, Manfred (1999). "Ambrosii carmen de obitu Probi. Ein Gedicht des Mailänder Bischofs in epigraphischer Überlieferung". Hermes. 127: 99–116.
- Seyfarth, Wolfgang (1970). "Sextus Petronius Probus. Legende und Wirklichkeit". Klio. 52: 411–425. doi:10.1524/klio.1970.52.52.411. S2CID 194419931.
- Thacker, Alan (2013). "Popes, emperors and clergy at Old St Peter's from the fourth to the eighth centuries". In McKitterick, Rosamond; Osborne, John; Richardson, Carol M.; Story, Joanna (eds.). Old Saint Peter's, Rome. Cambridge University Press. pp. 143–144. ISBN 978-1-107-72963-6.

Political offices
Preceded by Valentinian III; Valens III	Roman consul 371 with Gratian	Succeeded by Domitius Modestus; Arintheus
