= Faltonia Betitia Proba =

Ancient Roman Christian poet

- Notable work: Constantini bellum adversus Magnentium; Cento Vergilianus de laudibus Christi
- Spouse: Clodius Celsinus Adelphius
- Children: Quintus Clodius Hermogenianus Olybrius; Faltonius Probus Alypius
- Father: Petronius Probianus

Faltonia Betitia Proba (c. 306/315 CE – c. 353/366 CE) was a Latin Roman Christian poet. A member of one of the most influential aristocratic families, she composed the Cento Vergilianus de laudibus Christi, a cento composed with verses by Virgil re-ordered to form an epic poem centred on the life of Jesus.

== Life ==
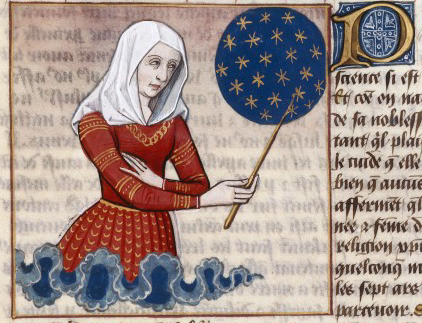
Faltonia Proba teaching the history of the world since the Creation through her Cento Vergilianus de laudibus Christi. Miniature from a 15th-century manuscript of the De mulieribus claris by Giovanni Boccaccio

Proba belonged to an influential family of the 4th century, the Petronii Probi. Her father was Petronius Probianus, Roman consul in 322, while her mother was probably called Demetria. She had a brother, Petronius Probinus, appointed consul in 341; also her grandfather, Pompeius Probus, had been a consul, in 310. Proba married Clodius Celsinus Adelphus, praefectus urbi of Rome in 351, thus creating a bond with the powerful gens Anicia. They had at least two sons, Quintus Clodius Hermogenianus Olybrius and Faltonius Probus Alypius, who became high imperial officers. She also had a granddaughter Anicia Faltonia Proba, daughter of Olybrius and Turrania Anicia Juliana.

Her family was pagan, but Proba converted to Christianity when she was an adult, influencing her husband and her sons, who converted after her. Proba died before Celsinus. She was probably buried with her husband in the Basilica di Sant'Anastasia al Palatino in Rome, where, until the 16th century, there was their funerary inscription, later moved to Villa Borghese before disappearing. The bond between Proba and this church might be related to Saint Anastasia, who probably belonged to the gens Anicia: Proba and Celsinus could have received the honour of being buried ad sanctos (next to the tomb of a saint), because of the particular veneration of the Anicii for this saint.

With her husband she owned the Horti Aciliorum at Rome, on the Pincian Hill.

== Works ==
Two poems are attributed to "Proba", and only one is extant. Most modern scholars identify Faltonia Betitia Proba as the author of these works, with the other possible identification being her niece Anicia Faltonia Proba.

=== Constantini bellum adversus Magnentium ===
The first poem, now lost, is called Constantini bellum adversus Magnentium (The War of Constantine against Magnentius) by the Codex Mutinensis. It dealt with the war between Roman Emperor Constantius II and the usurper Magnentius. Proba was involved to this war through her husband Clodius Celsinus Adelphus, who had been praefectus urbi of Rome in 351, the same year Italy passed from the sphere of influence of Magnentius to Constantius after the Battle of Mursa Major.

The existence of this first poem is based on the first verses of the second poem. Here Proba rejects her first Pagan composition, and scholars think that the Pagan poem was destroyed according to her will.

=== Cento Vergilianus de laudibus Christi ===
Proba's most famous work is a Virgilian cento—a patchwork of verses extracted from several works of Virgil, with minimal modifications—entitled Cento Vergilianus de laudibus Christi (A Virgilian Cento Concerning the Glory of Christ). The 694 lines are divided into a proemium with invocation (lines 1–55), episodes from the Old Testament (lines 56-345), episodes from the New Testament (lines 346–688), and an epilogue (lines 689–694).
