= Flavius Anicius Olybrius =

Flavius Anicius Olybrius may refer to:

- Flavius Anicius Olybrius, Roman Emperor
- Anicius Hermogenianus Olybrius, Roman politician
