= Lucius Aradius Valerius Proculus =

Lucius Aradius Valerius Proculus signo Populonius (fl. 333–352) was a senator and a politician of the Roman Empire, twice praefectus urbi of Rome (in 337–338 and in 351–352) and once consul (in 340).

== Life ==
He was a vir clarissimus, the lowest rank of senator. His offices were: augur, pontifex major, quindecimvir sacris faciundis, pontifex flavialis, praetor tutelaris, legatus pro praetore in Numidia, peraequator census in Gallaecia, praeses of Byzacena, consularis of Europa and Thracia, consularis of Sicily, comes of the second order, comes of the first order, then proconsul of Africa (before 333).

Lucius Aurelius Avianius Symmachus wrote an epigram in his honour. A statue was dedicated to Proculus by the merchants of pig meat and the leather makers; the inscription is preserved in the Museo Nazionale Romano of Palazzo Altemps in Rome.

He was appointed praefectus urbi of Rome in 337–338, under Emperor Constans. In 340 he was Consul, with Septimius Acindynus as colleague. Eleven years later, in 351, under the usurper Magnentius, he was appointed praefectus urbi of Rome for the second time, and kept this office until the following year, when Magnentius lost control of Italy.

== In fiction ==
Proculus is the grandfather of Flavia Vindex, the heroine of a novel, Britanniae, by M. O'Sullivan, set in Britain and published in 2011.

== Bibliography ==
- Chronography of 354 (MGH Chronica Minora I, 1892, p. 69).
- CIL VI, 1690, CIL VI, 1691, CIL VI, 1692, CIL VI, 1693, CIL VI, 1694, AE 1934, 158, CIL VIII, 24521
- Martindale, John R.; Jones, A. H. M.; Morris, John, eds. (1971). "Proculus 11". The Prosopography of the Later Roman Empire: Volume I, AD 260–395. Cambridge: Cambridge University Press. pp. 747–749. ISBN 0-521-07233-6.

Political offices
Preceded by Constantius Augustus II; Constans Augustus	Roman consul 340 with Septimius Acindynus	Succeeded by Antonius Marcellinus; Petronius Probinus
Preceded by Ceionius Rufius Albinus	Praefectus urbi of Rome; March 337 – January 338	Succeeded by Maecilius Hilarianus
Preceded by Clodius Celsinus Adelphius	Praefectus urbi of Rome; December 351 – September 352	Succeeded by Septimius Mnasea
