= Faltonius Probus Alypius =

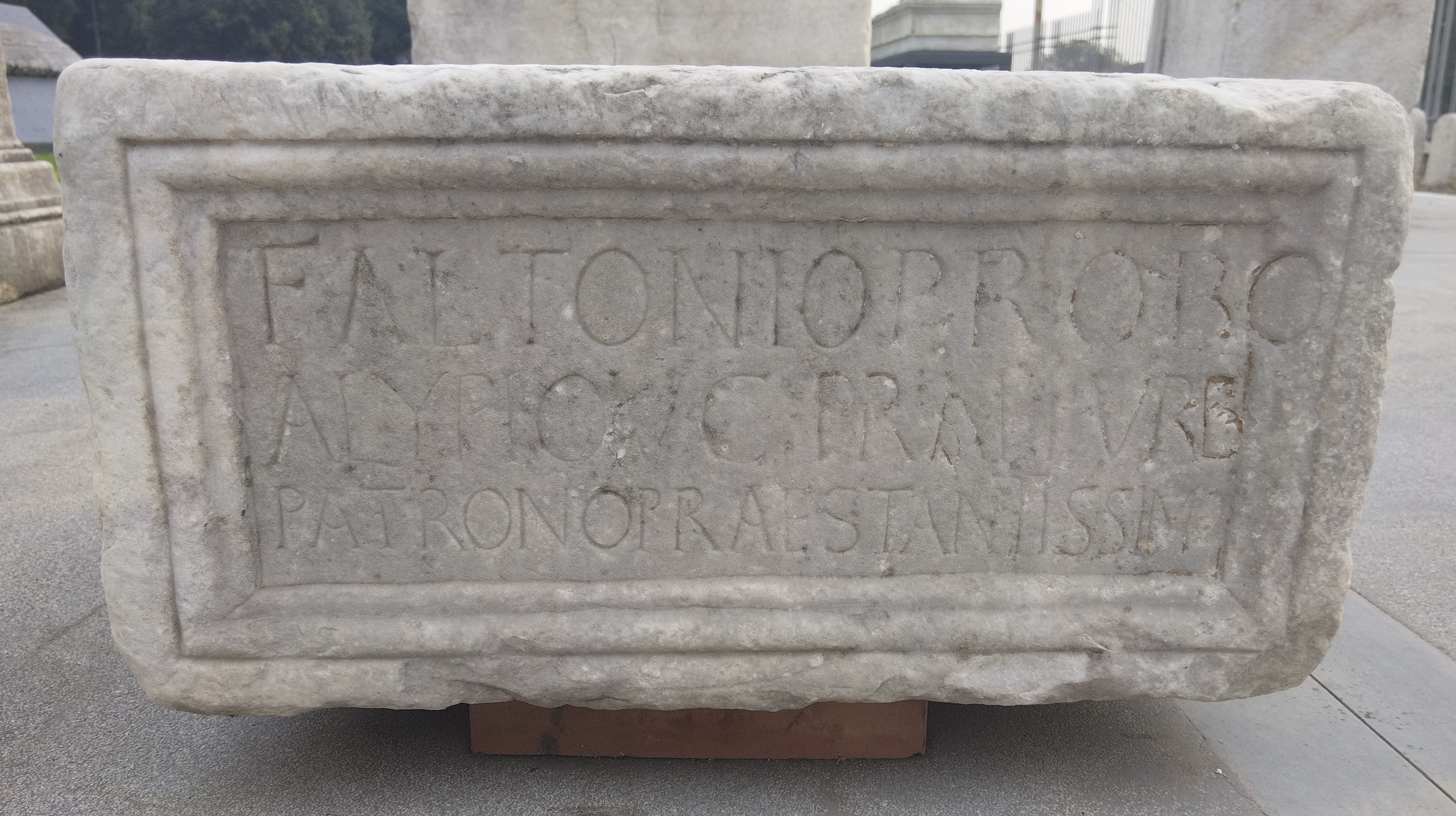
Inscription on the base of a statue dedicated to Faltonius Probus Alypius

Faltonius Probus Alypius (floruit 370–397) was a politician of the Roman Empire.

== Life ==
Alypius was the son of Clodius Celsinus Adelphius, Praefectus urbi of Rome in 351, and of the Christian poet Faltonia Betitia Proba. His brother, Quintus Clodius Hermogenianus Olybrius, was Roman consul in 379.

In 370/371 he was exiled, under the investigations of Maximinus. In 378 he held a high office in Mauretania, possibly vicarius of Africa. On June 12, 391, he is attested ad Praefectus urbi of Rome. In 393 he was sent to the court of Emperor Eugenius, on occasion of the celebrations for the consulship of Virius Nicomachus Flavianus for the following year.

He was the addressee of some letters by Quintus Aurelius Symmachus, showing he was alive in 397, and maybe even from Ambrose.

== Sources ==
- Martindale, John R.; Jones, A. H. M.; Morris, John, eds. (1971). The Prosopography of the Later Roman Empire: Volume I, AD 260–395. Cambridge: Cambridge University Press. p. 49. ISBN 0-521-07233-6.

Political offices
| Preceded by Ceionius Rufius Albinus | Praefectus urbi of Rome; 391 | Succeeded by Flavius Philippus |
