= Anicia Peters =

Anicia Nicola Peters
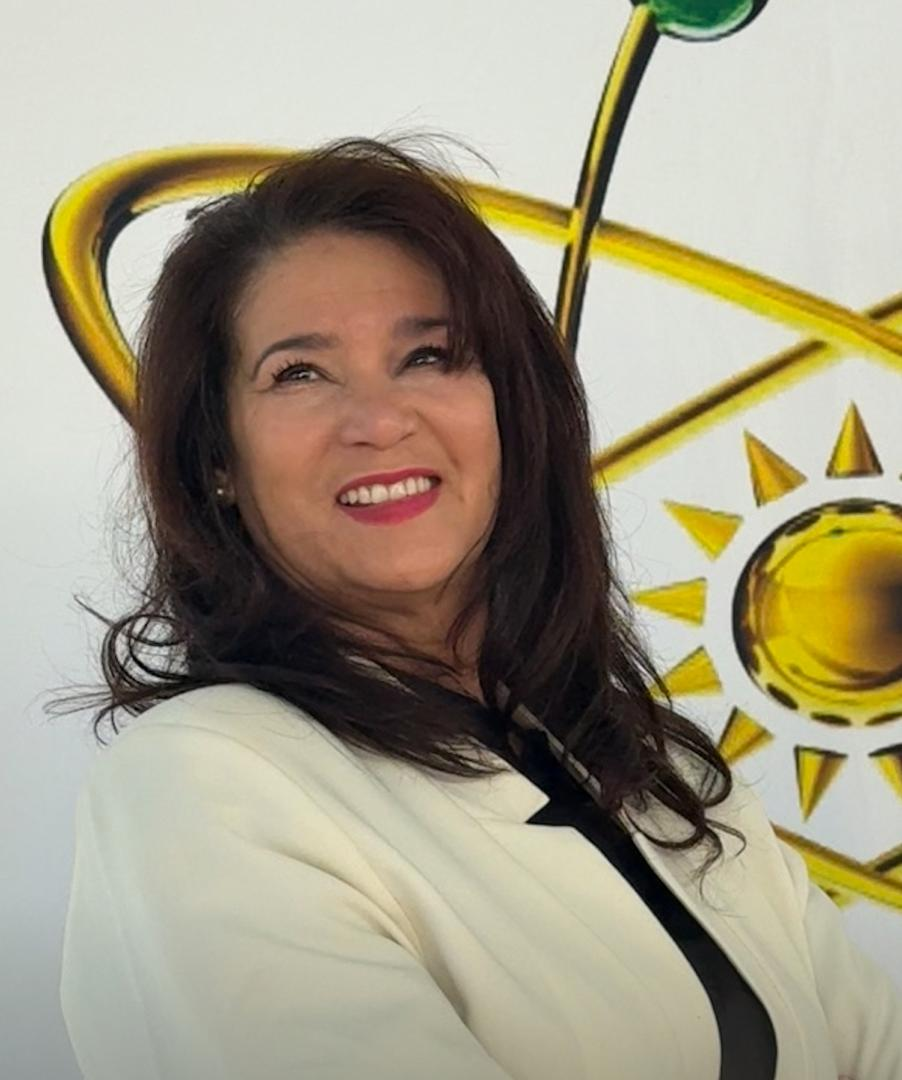

Chief Executive Officer: National Commission on Research, Science and Technology
- In office March 2023

Pro-vice-chancellor for Research, Innovation and Development University of Namibia
- In office June 2020 – March 2023

Personal details
- Born: 11 July 1972 (age 54) Rehoboth, Namibia (then South West Africa)
- Children: 4
- Education: Namibia University of Science and Technology (B.Tech); Iowa State University (MSc), (PhD)

Anicia Nicola Peters is a Namibian computer scientist specialising in human–computer interaction. She is the CEO of the National Commission of Research, Science and Technology.

== Early life and education ==
Anicia Nicola Peters was born in Rehoboth, Namibia and attended Origo Primary School. Her family moved to the Khomasdal suburb of Windhoek when she was about 8; there, she attended M.H. Greeff Primary School and later Concordia College.

Peters earned two undergraduate degrees, both cum laude, from the Namibia University of Science and Technology (formerly the Polytechnic of Namibia): a National Diploma in Business Computing and a B.Tech. in Business Computing. For her B.Tech. degree, she earned the Rector's Medal for outstanding achievement and the Prof. Yrjö Neuvo Award for the best graduate in information technology at the institution.

Peters then studied at Iowa State University, obtaining an MSc and a PhD in human–computer interaction. She received two scholarship awards from Boeing in 2013 for her contributions to publications of the human–computer interaction research conference. For her PhD, she received a Research Excellence Award from Iowa State University. She completed her PhD under a Fulbright International Science and Technology Award and a Schlumberger Faculty for the Future Women in Science fellowship. Her current research work is on social computing, gender in digital technologies, gamification, and e-participation, such as e-government and e-health.

In 2012, she became a Google Anita Borg scholar in the United States. She also interned at Intuit in Silicon Valley as a user experience researcher prior to accepting a postdoctoral fellowship at Oregon State University, where she worked under Margaret Burnett, who co-founded the area of end-user software engineering and developed two visual programming languages.

== Academic career ==
In 2015, Peters became Executive Dean of the Faculty of Computing and Informatics and an associate professor in computer science at the Namibia University of Science and Technology and its first Namibian dean, where she contributed to establishing the India-Namibia Centre of Excellence in IT.

In Namibia, she started several initiatives, such as the Namibia Women in Computing conference and three chapters of the Association for Computing Machinery. One such local chapter is the ACM-W. She further chaired the International Culture and Computer Science Conference in Windhoek in October 2016. She also initiated and co-chaired the inaugural Africa Human Computer Interaction Conference in Nairobi, Kenya, in November 2016 and served as special advisor to the conference in 2018. In 2016, Peters was made Star Of The Week by the New Era newspaper highlighting her work in academia and research.

In February 2017, she was featured as one of 20 prominent personalities in Who's Who Namibia 2017. She is also one of 10 African Women Rolemodels in Technology featured by Afchix.

From 2020 until she was appointed CEO of the National Commission of Research, Science and Technology, Peters served as the Pro-Vice Chancellor for Research, Innovation and Development at the University of Namibia, overseeing the university's research and innovation activities.

In July 2021, she was appointed by President Hage Geingob as the Chairperson of the Namibia Presidential Task Force on the Fourth Industrial Revolution.

Since December 2022, she has been the CEO of the National Commission of Research, Science and Technology.

Peters has served as the vice chair of the board of directors of the Namibia Qualifications Authority and as a member of the Namibia Council for Higher Education. President Hage Geingob appointed Peters as the chairperson of the Task Force on the Fourth Industrial Revolution for Namibia in July 2021.

Prof Peters is married with four children.
