= Cento (poetry) =

Literary genre

A cento is a poetical work wholly composed of verses or passages taken from other authors, especially the Greek poet Homer and the Roman poet Virgil, disposed in a new form or order.

== Etymology ==
The Latin term cento derives from Greek κέντρων (kentrōn), meaning "a piece of patch-work, rag." There is also the similar word Greek ἐγκεντρίζειν (enkentrizein), meaning "to plant slips (of trees)" (i.e., "to graft") and a later Greek word, κεντόνη (kentonē), that means "patchwork garment." According to Hugh Gerard Evelyn-White, "A cento is therefore a poem composed of odd fragments."

== History ==
The cento originated in the 3rd or 4th century AD. The first known cento is the Medea by Hosidius Geta, composed out of Virgilian lines, according to Tertullian. However, an earlier cento might be present in Irenaeus's late-2nd century work Adversus Haereses. He either cites or composes a cento as a demonstration of how heretical Christians modify canonical Gospels.

Ausonius (310–395) is the only poet from Antiquity to comment on the form and content of the Virgilian cento; his statements are afterward regarded as authoritative. The pieces, he says, may be taken either from the same poet, or from several. The individual fragments of poetry used should be no shorter than one half-line (one hemistich) and no longer than a full line and a half. In accordance with these rules, he made a cento from Virgil, the Cento Nuptialis.

Faltonia Betitia Proba wrote a Cento Vergilianus de laudibus Christi, in which she details the life of Jesus and deeds of the Old and New Testaments; it was written entirely in centos taken from Virgil.

In the Greek World, centos, such as those by Aelia Eudocia, are mainly composed by verses taken from Homer.

The Politics of Justus Lipsius (Politicorum Libri Sex, 1589) consists only of centos, there being nothing of his own but conjunctions and particles. Etienne de Pleure did the same as Proba in Sacra Aeneis (1618). Alexander Ross did the same thing in his Virgilii Evangelisantis Christiados (1634), his most celebrated work of poetry.

== Example ==
The following is a sample from the cento Sacra Aeneis (1618), by Etienne de Pleure, on the adoration of the Magi. The lines of Vergil used, from his Aeneid and Georgics, are indicated on the left (e.g. 6.255 points to book 6, line 255); or, if changed in the middle of a line, an asterisk separates the new quotation with its source indicated on the right.

Adoratio Magorum (Gospel of Matthew 2)
Aeneid 6.255	Ecce autem primi sub lumina solis, et ortus,
Aeneid 2.694	Stella facem ducens multa cum luce cucurrit :
Aeneid 5.526	Signavitque Viam * coeli in regione serena.	Aeneid 8.528.
Aeneid 8.330	Tum Reges * (credo quia sit divinitus illis	Georgics 9.415.
Georgics 1.416.	Ingenium, et rerum fato prudentia major)
Aeneid 7.98.	Externi veniunt * quae cuique est copia laeti	Aeneid 5.100
Aeneid 3.464.	Dona dehinc auro gravia, * Regumque Parentem.	Aeneid 6.548.
Georgics 1.418.	Mutavere vias, * perfectis ordine votis :	Aeneid 10.548.
Aeneid 6.16.	Insuetum per iter, * spatia in sua quisque recessit.	Aeneid 12.126.

The following is an example in English, taken from The Dictionary of Wordplay (2001) by Dave Morice:

I only know she came and went, (Lowell)
Like troutlets in a pool; (Hood)
She was a phantom of delight, (Wordsworth)
And I was like a fool. (Eastman)

== See also ==
- Bricolage
- Found poetry
- Vocabularyclept poem – Type of poem
