= Arusianus Messius =

Latin grammarian

Arusianus Messius, or Messus (fl. 395) was a Latin grammarian who flourished in the 4th century.

== Life ==
He was the author of a small extant work Exempla Elocutionum, dedicated to Olybrius and Probinus, consuls for the year 395. It contains an alphabetical list, chiefly of verbs admitting more than one construction, with examples from each of four writers, Virgil, Sallust, Terence and Cicero.

Cassiodorus, the only writer who mentions Arusianus, refers to his work Exempla Elocutionum by the term Quadriga.

== Sources ==
- Heinrich Keil, Grammatici Latini, vii.
- WHD Suringar, Historia Critica Scholiastarum Latinorum (1834–1835)
- Van der Hoeven, Specimen Literarium (1845)
