= Anicius Petronius Probus =

Roman senator (fl. 395–406 AD)

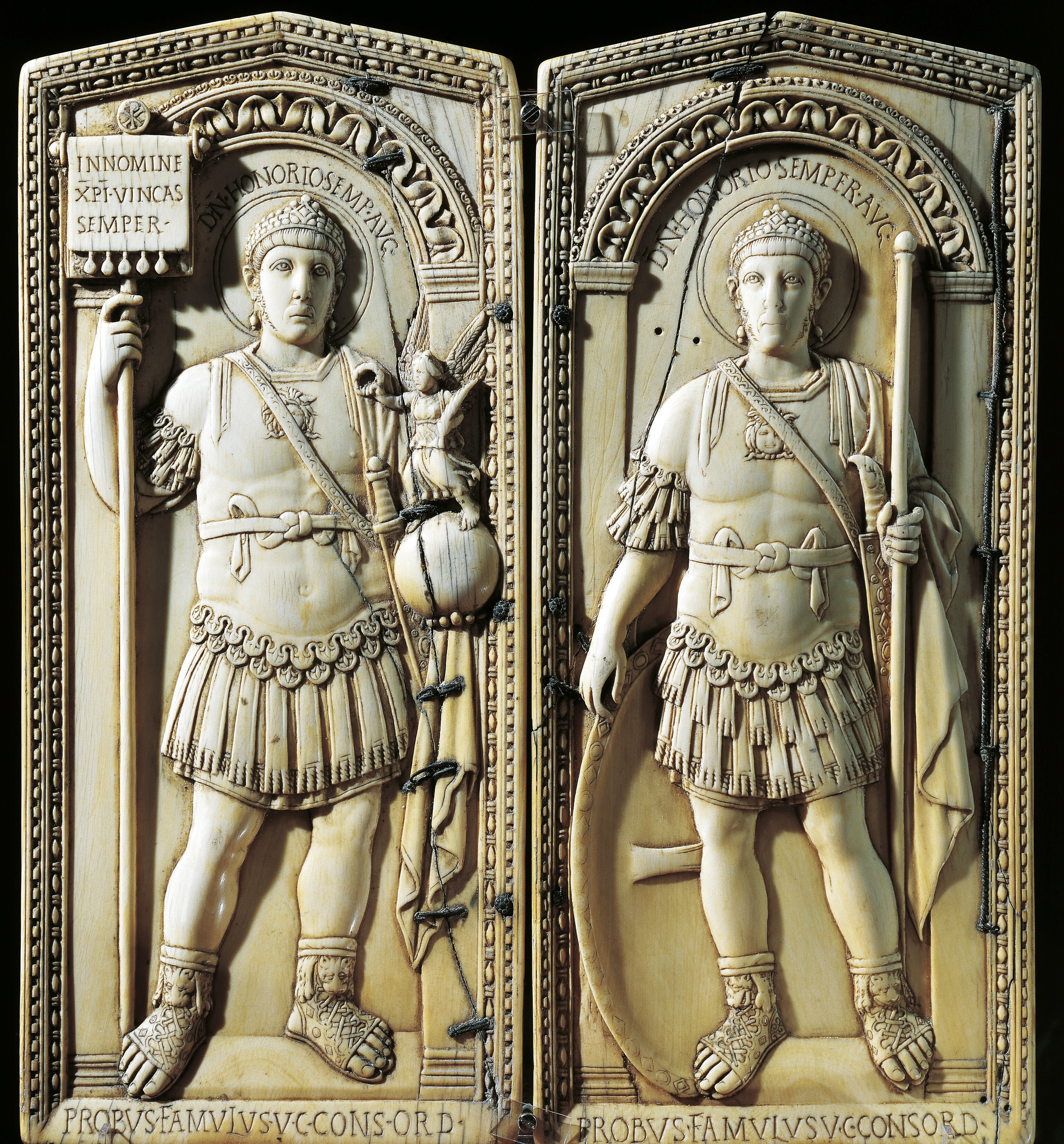
Western Roman Emperor Honorius, depicted on the consular diptych with Probus (406, Aosta, CIL V, 6836)

Anicius Petronius Probus (fl. 395–406 AD) was a politician of the Western Roman Empire.

== Biography ==
A member of the gens Anicia, he was the son of Sextus Claudius Petronius Probus (consul in 371) and of Anicia Faltonia Proba; his elder brothers were Anicius Hermogenianus Olybrius and Anicius Probinus (consuls in 395), and his sister was Anicia Proba.

In 395, he is attested as quaestor elected by the Emperor. In 406, Anicius was consul contemporaneously with the Eastern Emperor Arcadius. One of his consular diptychs is preserved at the Museo del tesoro della cattedrale di Aosta, and depicts Emperor Honorius.

Probus was a Christian.

== General and cited references ==
- CIL VI, 1754, an inscription set up by Probus and his brother Probinus in honour of their mother.
- Martindale, John R., ed. (1980). The Prosopography of the Later Roman Empire: Volume II, AD 395–527. Cambridge: Cambridge University Press. pp. 913–914. ISBN 0-521-20159-4.

Political offices
Preceded by Stilicho; Anthemius	Roman consul 406 with Arcadius	Succeeded by Honorius; Theodosius
