= Demetrias (daughter of Anicius Hermogenianus Olybrius) =

Demetrias (fl. 413–440) was a Roman noblewoman, member of the powerful family of the Anicii and acquaintance of several churchmen.

== Biography ==
Anicia Demetrias, born around 398, was the daughter of Anicius Hermogenianus Olybrius, consul in 395, and of Anicia Iuliana, and thus member of the noble gentes Anicia and Amnia; her grandmother Proba is described as the noblest and richest person in the Roman world in the 410s.

In 410, in occasion of the sack of Rome, Demetrias left Rome with her mother Iuliana and with her paternal grandmother Anicia Faltonia Proba and went to Carthage; here they were imprisoned by the comes Heraclianus, and freed only after a huge payment.

While her mother and her grandmother lived in Carthage, they came into contact with Augustine of Hippo, who helped them to follow the path of a religious life. Demetrias, who was about fifteen years old in 413, was to be married, but she secretly followed an ascetical way of life, influenced by Augustine. She did not tell her relatives about her choice, as she was worried about displeasing them. However, as her marriage was approaching, she decided to tell her mother Iuliana and her grandmother Proba about her intention to renounce to marry and to take the veil. Her relatives were very happy with her, and, in 413, Demetrias took the veil in a ceremony celebrated by Bishop Aurelius of Carthage.

To help her in her spiritual life, Iuliana and Proba asked several churchmen to send Demetrias advice. Augustine answered, suggesting the reading of his De sancta virginitate, Jerome sent a long letter with several pieces of advice, while Pelagius, a theologian opposed by Augustine, addressed her a treatise in the form of a letter, the Epistola ad Demetriam.

Later in her life, Demetrias returned to her native city of Rome. During this time she received the Epistula ad Demetriadem de vera humilitate, written in 440 by Pope Leo I or, according to recent studies, in 435 by Prosper of Aquitaine, and attacking Pelagius' doctrine on the basis of Augustine.

Demetrias built a church devoted to Saint Stephen along the Via Latina (41°51′41.81″N 12°32′15.17″E ), three miles from Rome, on one of her properties. She died during the pontificate of Pope Leo I.

== Bibliography ==
- Augustine, Mary S. Muldowney, Treatises on various subjects, CUA Press, 2002, ISBN 0-8132-1320-7, pp. 270–2.
- Martindale, John R., ed. (1980). "Demetrias". The Prosopography of the Later Roman Empire: Volume II, AD 395–527. Cambridge: Cambridge University Press. pp. 351–352. ISBN 0-521-20159-4.
