= Septimius Acindynus =

Roman consul

Septimius Acindynus (Greek: Σεπτίμιος ό Άκίνδυνος) was a Roman consul with Valerius Proculus in 340 AD. He was governor of Antioch when he imprisoned a man who had been unable to pay a pound of gold into the public treasury. He released him after his wife, with his own sanction, "listened to the persuasions" of a rich man; but the rich man had filled her purse with earth instead of gold. He revealed his fraud to Acindynus. Condemning himself for the rigor which had led to the crime, Acindynus paid the gold himself, and gave the woman the field from which the earth had been brought.

Political offices
Preceded by Imp. Caesar Fl. Iulius Constantius Augustus II and Imp. Caesar Fl. Iulius Constans Augustus	Consul of the Roman Empire consul with Lucius Aradius Valerius Proculus; 340	Succeeded by Antonius Marcellinus and Petronius Probinus
