= Quintus Fabius Clodius Agrippianus Celsinus =

Quintus Fabius Clodius Agrippianus Celsinus (c. 210 - after 249) was proconsul of Caria in 249. He was the son of Clodius Celsinus (born c. 185) and his wife Fabia Fuscinella (born c. 190), paternal grandson of Marcus Clodius Macrinus Hermogenianus (born c. 150), and great-grandson of Marcus Clodius Macrinius Vindex Hermogenianus (born c. 125), a proconsul of Africa c. 200. His wife was Laberia Pompeiana (born c. 225). His maternal grandparents were Quintus Fabius (born c. 165) and wife Fuscinella (born c. 165), daughter of Publius Seius Fuscianus (born c. 120), consul in 151, praefectus urbi from 187 to 189 and suffect consul in 188.

Clodius Agrippianus Celsinus was the father of

- Clodius Celsinus (born c. 245), whose son was
  - Clodius Celsinus (born c. 280) and father of
    - Clodius Celsinus Adelphius, praefectus urbi in 351.

These Clodii Celsini continued to practice the traditional religions of antiquity and remained unconverted in the face of Christian hegemony through at least the 4th century until Clodius Celsinus Adelphius.

== Sources ==
- Les ancêtres de Charlemagne, 1989
- Continuité gentilice et continuité sénatoriale dans les familles sénatoriales romaines à l'époque impériale, 2000
