= Anicius Probus =

Anicius Probus (fl. 459) was a Roman politician.

A Christian, he is attested in an inscription dated to 30 August 459, found in Aquileia, but now lost; it was the inscription on the tomb of Anicia Ulfina (emended in Iuliana by recent scholars) erected by her parents Anicius Probus and Adeleta (emended in Adelfia by recent scholars, and the daughter of Valerius Adelphius Bassus).

This Anicius Probus has been identified as a member of the gens Anicia; he should be the son of the consul Anicius Hermogenianus Olybrius and wife and cousin Anicia Iuliana. It is also possible that he was the Probus who, in 424, was a praetor.

In the inscription, Probus is styled as vir inlustris, but his office is not given; however, since he belonged to a noble and prestigious family, he could have been a praetorian prefect or a praefectus urbi. Settipani suggests that he may have been the father of the emperor Olybrius.

His mausoleum was most likely located behind the apse of old St. Peter's basilica, as shown by surviving floor plans and maps of the basilica. Although as it is only referred to as the "mausoleum of Probus" it could also be that of St. Probus. It is not known as it was destroyed with the rest of the structure.

== Bibliography ==
- Martindale, John Robert, John Morris, and Arnold Hugh Martin Jones, "Anicius Probus 7", The Prosopography of the Later Roman Empire, Volume 2, Cambridge University Press, p. 911.
