= Yrjö Neuvo =

Finnish research director and professor

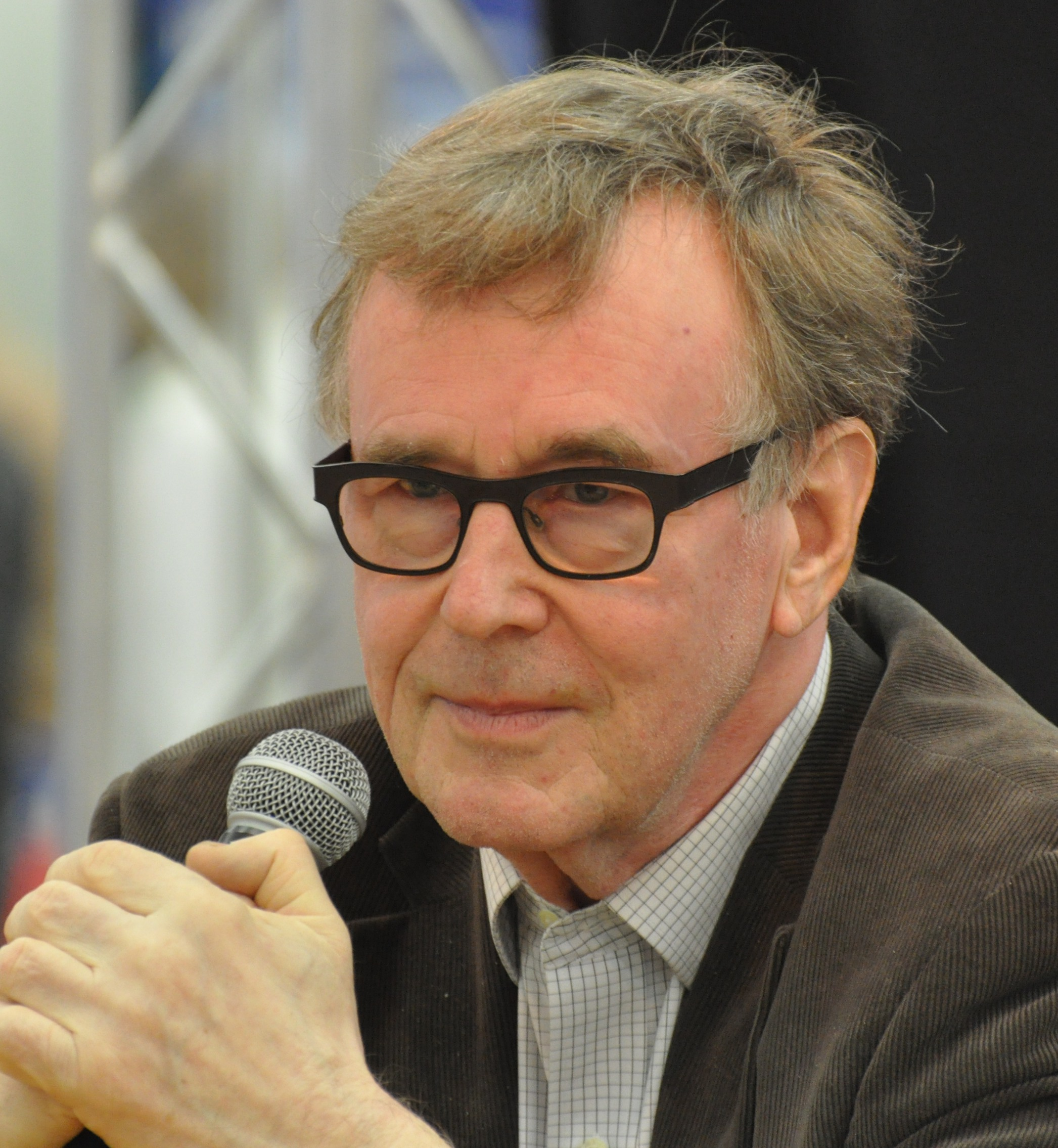
- Born: 21 July 1943 (age 83); Turku, Finland
- Education: Helsinki University of Technology; Cornell University
- Known for: Microprogrammable Digital Filter
- Awards: IEEE Life Fellows
- Scientific career
- Fields: Digital signal processing (DSP)
- Workplaces: Helsinki University of Technology, Tampere University of Technology (TUT)
- Thesis: The Application of Digital Techniques to a VOR Signal Generator (1973)

Yrjö Aunus Olavi Neuvo (born 21 July 1943) is a Finnish engineer and professor emeritus.

In 1976 Neuvo was appointed professor of electronics (1976–1992) at Tampere University of Technology. Under his leadership, postgraduate education from digital signal processing (DSP) began immediately at Tampere University of Technology. Graduate studies in digital signal processing continued for two years until 1978.

== Publications ==
=== Monographs ===
- The Application of Digital Techniques to a VOR Signal Generator. Doctoral thesis, Cornell University, 1974.
- Neuvo, Yrjö: Rekisteröintilaitteiston suunnittelu radiotieteellistä mittausjärjestelmää varten (Design of recording equipment for a radio science measurement system). TKK 1968.
- Neuvo, Yrjö: Digitaalinen VOR-pientaajuusgeneraattori (Digital VOR low frequency generator). TKK 1971.
- Neuvo, Yrjö; Ojala, L.; Reimavuo, J.: The optimal generation of sine waveforms using first-order hold reconstruction techniques. TKK 1971.
- Neuvo, Yrjö: Digital VOR audio generator, 19 pages, TKK 1972.
- Neuvo, Yrjö: Analysis and digital realization of Pseudo Random Gaussian and impulsive noise source. TKK 1973. ISBN 951-750-096-3.
- Neuvo, Yrjö: The application of digital signal prosessing in the design of a digital noise source. TKK 1974. ISBN 951-750-281-8.

=== Articles ===
- Neuvo, Yrjö: The Application of Digital Techniques to a VOR Signal Generator. IEEE Transactions on Aerospace and Electronic Systems, vol. AES-9, no. 1, pp. 38–42, 1973. doi:10.1109/TAES.1973.309698.
- Neuvo, Yrjö; Ku, Walter: Analysis and Digital Realization of a Pseudorandom Gaussian and Impulsive Noise Source. IEEE Transactions on Communications, 1975: 23:9:849–858. doi:10.1109/TCOM.1975.1092912.

== Awards and honors ==
- IEEE Fellow 1989 for contribution to digital-signal processing algorithms and engineering education, Life Fellow 2009
