= Anicius Probinus =

Roman senator

Anicius Probinus (fl. 395–397) was a politician and aristocrat of the Roman Empire.

== Biography ==
A member of the noble gens Anicia, Probinus was the son of Sextus Claudius Petronius Probus, one of the most influential men of his era and consul in 371, and of Anicia Faltonia Proba; he was then the brother of Anicius Hermogenianus Olybrius, Anicius Petronius Probus and Anicia Proba. According to a reconstruction, Probinus was the father of Petronius Maximus, briefly a Western Roman emperor in the spring of 455.

Probinus was raised with his brother Olybrius in Rome, where he was born. He and his brother Olybrius shared the consulate in 395, while both were very young; Claudian dedicated Panegyricus de consulatu Probini et Olybrii to the brothers on this occasion. Although they belonged to a traditionally pagan senatorial family, Olybrius and Probinus were Christians.

Probinus was then proconsul of Africa in 396–397. While proconsul, in 396 he received a letter from Quintus Aurelius Symmachus (Epistols, ix); on 17 March 397, he received a law preserved in the Codex Theodosianus (XII.5.3).

Arusianus Messius dedicated his Exempla elocutionem to both brothers, and Symmachus addressed a letter to both in 397 (Epistles, v). It is known that Probinus composed verses.

== Bibliography ==
=== Primary sources ===
- Claudian, Panegyricus de consulatu Probini et Olybrii
- CIL VI, 1752

=== Secondary sources ===
- Martindale, John R.; Jones, A. H. M.; Morris, John, eds. (1971). The Prosopography of the Later Roman Empire: Volume I, AD 260–395. Cambridge: Cambridge University Press. pp. 734–735. ISBN 0-521-07233-6.
- Drinkwater, John, and Hugh Elton, Fifth-Century Gaul: A Crisis of Identity?, Cambridge University Press, 1992, ISBN 0-521-52933-6, pp. 119–120.
- Hartmut Leppin, Theodosius der Große. Wissenschaftliche Buchgesellschaft, Darmstadt 2003, p. 222.

Political offices
Preceded by Arcadius; Honorius	Roman consul 395 with Anicius Hermogenianus Olybrius	Succeeded by Arcadius; Honorius
