= Anicia gens =

Ancient Roman family

The gens Anicia (or the Anicii) was a plebeian family at ancient Rome, mentioned first towards the end of the fourth century BC. The first of the Anicii to achieve prominence under the Republic was Lucius Anicius Gallus, who conducted the war against the Illyrians during the Third Macedonian War, in 168 BC.

A noble family bore this name in the imperial era, and may have been descended from the Anicii of the Republic.

== Origin ==
The Anicii may have been from the Latin town of Praeneste. The earliest of the family to hold any curule magistracy at Rome bore the surname Praenestinus.

== Praenomina ==
The Anicii are known to have used the praenomina Lucius, Quintus, Marcus, Gnaeus, Titus, and Gaius.

== Branches and cognomina ==
The only major branch of the family during the Republic used the cognomen Gallus, which may refer to a cock, or to a Gaul. The surname Praenestinus, found in earlier times, may indicate that the family originated at the city of Praeneste. It was probably a personal cognomen, as it does not appear in later times.

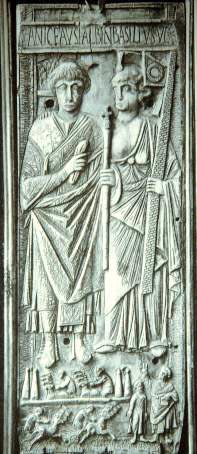
Consular diptych of Anicius Faustus Albinus Basilius, the last regularly-appointed consul (AD 541)

In the fourth century, a Roman family bearing the nomen Anicius rose to great prominence. The historian Edward Gibbon writes:

From the reign of Diocletian to the final extinction of the Western empire, that name shone with a lustre which was not eclipsed, in the public estimation, by the majesty of the Imperial purple. The several branches, to whom it was communicated, united, by marriage or inheritance, the wealth and titles of the Annian, the Petronian, and the Olybrian houses; and in each generation the number of consulships was multiplied by an hereditary claim. The Anician family excelled in faith and in riches: they were the first of the Roman senate who embraced Christianity; and it is probable that Anicius Julian, who was afterwards consul and praefect of the city, atoned for his attachment to the party of Maxentius, by the readiness with which he accepted the religion of Constantine.

Their ample patrimony was increased by the industry of Probus, the chief of the Anician family; who shared with Gratian the honors of the consulship, and exercised, four times, the high office of Praetorian praefect. His immense estates were scattered over the wide extent of the Roman world; and though the public might suspect or disapprove the methods by which they had been acquired, the generosity and magnificence of that fortunate statesman deserved the gratitude of his clients, and the admiration of strangers. Such was the respect entertained for his memory, that the two sons of Probus, in their earliest youth, and at the request of the senate, were associated in the consular dignity; a memorable distinction, without example, in the annals of Rome.

"The marbles of the Anician palace," were used as a proverbial expression of opulence and splendor; but the nobles and senators of Rome aspired, in due gradation, to imitate that illustrious family.

A branch of the family transferred to the Eastern Roman Empire, establishing itself in Constantinople (where Anicia Juliana, daughter of Western emperor Anicius Olybrius, was a patron of the arts) and rising in prestige: the scholar and philosopher Boëthius was a member of this family, as was Anicius Faustus Albinus Basilius, the last person other than the Emperor himself to hold the office of consul, in 541. In the West, on the other side, the Anicii were supporters of the independence of the Western Empire from the Eastern one; they were, therefore, supporters of the Ostrogothic kings of Italy, and such celebrated by the king Theodahad.

In the later Middle Ages, the Frangipani family claimed descent from the Anicii. However, since the first mention of the Frangipanis dates only from 1014, the veracity of this claim has been questioned by historians.

== Members ==
This list includes abbreviated praenomina. For an explanation of this practice, see filiation.

=== Anicii of the Republic ===
- Quintus Anicius Praenestinus, curule aedile in 304 BC.
- Marcus or Lucius Anicius Gallus, grandfather of Lucius Anicius Gallus, consul in 160 BC.
- Lucius Anicius (L.? n.) Gallus, father of Lucius, the consul of 160.
- Lucius Anicius L. f. L.? n. Gallus, as praetor peregrinus in 168 BC, during the Macedonian War, triumphed over Gentius, king of Illyria. He was consul in 160.
- Gnaeus Anicius, a legate of Lucius Aemilius Paullus in 168 BC, during the Third Macedonian War.
- Titus Anicius, commissioned by Cicero to purchase a house in the suburbs for him.
- Gaius Anicius, a senator, and a friend and neighbor of Cicero, who gave him a letter of introduction to Quintus Cornificius in Africa.

=== Imperial Anicii ===
- Publius Anicius P.f. Maximus, prefect under Domitius Ahenobarbus in Antioch.
- Gaius Anicius Cerialis, consul in AD 65.
- Anicius Maximus, proconsul of Bithynia c. 110.
- Quintus Anicius Faustus, consul in AD 198.
- Anicius Faustus Paulinus, legate of Moesia Inferior in 230.
- Sextus Cocceius Anicius Faustus Paulinus, proconsul of Africa under Gallienus.
- Anicius Sex.f. Faustus, consul II in AD 298, and praefectus urbi of Rome in 299–300.
- Amnius Anicius Julianus, consul in AD 322, and praefectus urbi of Rome in 326–329.
- Sextus Anicius Paulinus, consul in AD 325, and praefectus urbi of Rome in 331–333.
- Amnius Manius Caesonius Nicomachus Anicius Paulinus signo Honorius, consul in AD 334 and praefectus urbi of Rome in 334–335.
- Anicius Auchenius Bassus, praefectus urbi of Rome in AD 382 and 383.
- Tyrrenia Anicia Juliana, the daughter of Auchenius Bassus, married Quintus Clodius Hermogenianus Olybrius, consul in AD 379.
- Anicia Faltonia Proba, a poet, who married Sextus Claudius Petronius Probus, consul in AD 371.
- Pontius Meropius Anicius Paulinus, poet, governor and senator, was consul in AD 377.
- Anicius Hermogenianus Olybrius, consul in AD 395.
- Anicius Probinus, consul with his brother Hermogenianus Olybrius in AD 395.
- Anicius Petronius Probus, consul in AD 406.
- Anicia Proba, daughter of Sextus Claudius Petronius Probus.
- Demetrias, daughter of Hermogenianus.
- Anicius Auchenius Bassus, consul in AD 408.
- Aurelius Anicius Symmachus, praefectus urbi of Rome, AD 418–420.
- Anicius Auchenius Bassus, consul in AD 431.
- Petronius Maximus, consul in AD 433 and 443, was proclaimed emperor in 455.
- Anicius Probus, mentioned as a vir illustris in AD 459.
- Anicius Olybrius, proclaimed emperor in AD 472.
- Anicia Juliana, the daughter of Olybrius.
- Anicius Manlius Severinus Boëthius, consul in AD 510, an eminent scholar and philosopher.
- Symmachus, son of Boëthius, was consul in AD 522, with his brother, the younger Boëthius.
- Boëthius, son of the elder Boëthius, was consul with his brother, Symmachus, in AD 522.
- Anicius Maximus, consul in AD 523.
- Anicius Olybrius, consul in AD 526.
- Anicius Faustus Albinus Basilius, consul in AD 541, was the last person other than the Byzantine emperor to hold this title.
- Germanus, cousin and general of Justinian I, died in AD 550.
- Anicius Gregorius, later Pope Gregory I, praefectus urbi of Rome circa AD 573, served as Pope from 590 to 604.

== See also ==
- List of Roman gentes
