= Quintus Clodius Hermogenianus Olybrius =

Quintus Clodius Hermogenianus Olybrius (floruit 361 – 384) was a Roman politician, praefectus urbi of Rome from 368 to 370 and Roman consul in 379. Olybrius has been characterized as belonging to "the breed of flexible politicians who did well both under Valentinian I [...] and under Gratian."

== Life ==
Olybrius was a member of the senatorial aristocracy of Rome.

He was the son of Clodius Celsinus Adelphius, who had been praefectus urbi in 351, and of Faltonia Betitia Proba, a poet. His brother, Faltonius Probus Alypius, was praefectus urbi of Rome in 391. Proba converted to Christianity, and later had her husband and their sons, Olybrius included, convert to the same religion.

Olybrius married Turrania Anicia Juliana, a member of the Anicia gens, whose father, Anicius Auchenius Bassus, would become praefectus urbi of Rome in 382 and 383. Olybrius and Juliana had two daughters, Anicia Faltonia Proba and, Anicia, who married Pontius (Paulinus), a nobleman of Burdigala (Bordeaux) born c. 360, and was the mother of Adelfius I, bishop of Limoges.

He reached the rank of vir clarissimus, then consularis of Campania (before 361 he is attested as patron of Formia), proconsul of Africa Province (361), praefectus urbi of Rome (369-370), Praetorian prefect of Illyricum, Praetorian prefect of the East, and consul in 379. He died between 384 and 395.

During his office as praefectus urbi, which was generally calm and balanced, he arrested two suspected poisoners. He led the investigations, but he got ill and they passed to the praefectus annonae, Maximinus. He was then succeeded by Publius Ampelius.

In his consulate he was posterior to his colleague, the poet Ausonius, because he was the younger prefect. Ausonius had been in fact appointed Praetorian prefect of Gaul in late 377. Olybrius had been appointed prefect of Illyricum by emperor Gratian probably at the beginning of 378, in the wake of the preparations for the war against the Goths in Thracia that led to the defeat and death of emperor Valens in the Battle of Adrianople in August of that year.

It is also known that Olybrius was in Sirmium when he was appointed consul by Gratian, who also had already conferred upon Olybrius the Praetorian prefecture of the East.

Quintus Aurelius Symmachus records a trial in which he was a judge. A land-owner called Scirtius had been dispossessed of his property and had complained to Symmachus, who had then issued a decree giving the land back to Scirtius. Symmachus tells that he discovered that Olybrius was behind this misappropriation and that some of the agents had tried to avoid the restitution of the stolen property, even kidnapping people and bribing witnesses. Thus Olybrius is depicted as violent and greedy. This view is somehow confirmed by Ammianus Marcellinus' description of Olybrius' office as prefect: the historian, in fact, describes Olybrius as overly interested in luxury.

== Sources ==
- Martindale, John R.; Jones, A. H. M.; Morris, John, eds. (1971). The Prosopography of the Later Roman Empire: Volume I, AD 260–395. Cambridge: Cambridge University Press. pp. 640–642. ISBN 0-521-07233-6.

Political offices
Preceded by Flavius Valens Augustus VI, Flavius Valentinianus Iunior Augustus II	Consul of the Roman Empire; 379; With: Decimus Magnus Ausonius	Succeeded by Flavius Gratianus Augustus V, Flavius Theodosius Augustus I
Preceded by Vettius Agorius Praetextatus	Praefectus urbi of Rome; January 369 – August 370	Succeeded by Publius Ampelius
