= Anicia Faltonia Proba =

5th-century Roman noblewoman

Anicia Faltonia Proba (died in Africa, 432) was a Roman noblewoman of the gens Anicia.

== Biography ==
Proba's father was Quintus Clodius Hermogenianus Olybrius (consul in 379); the famous poet Faltonia Betitia Proba was her grandmother. She married Sextus Claudius Petronius Probus (consul in 371), and had three sons - Anicius Hermogenianus Olybrius and Anicius Probinus, joint consuls in 395, and Anicius Petronius Probus consul in 406 - and one daughter, Anicia Proba. Her son Olybrius married Anicia Juliana, and his daughter Demetrias was Proba's granddaughter. She was related to the aristocratic families of the Petronii, Clodii Celsini and Anicii; in two inscriptions dating to 395 she is described as daughter, wife and mother of consuls.

In 395 she was already a widow. A Christian, she was in contact with several members of the cultural circles of her age, among which Augustine of Hippo and John Chrysostom, in favour of whom she acted.

Proba was in Rome during the sack of the city in 410; according to Procopius of Caesarea, she opened the gates of the city to relieve the sufferings of the people besieged, but historians have suggested that this story was forged by her enemies. She then fled to Africa with her daughter-in-law Anicia Iuliana and her granddaughter Demetrias, but here she was abused by Heraclianus, who imprisoned and then freed them only after receiving a huge sum.

Proba inherited several possessions in Asia, and sold them to give the money to the Church and to the poor. She died in Africa in 432; it is known that her husband had been buried in the Old St. Peter's Basilica in a tomb where Proba was to be buried too.

As several other women in her family, Proba was well-educated. Anicia probably composed the epigraph in honour of the husband, and her granddaughter Demetrias was a friend of Jerome's, who describes her as well educated.

== Bibliography ==
=== Primary sources ===
- CIL VI, 1754; CIL VI, 1755; CIL VI, 1756; CIL VI, 32032=CIL XXV, 7158; CIL XXV, 7159

=== Secondary sources ===
- Martindale, John R.; Jones, A. H. M.; Morris, John, eds. (1971). The Prosopography of the Later Roman Empire: Volume I, AD 260–395. Cambridge: Cambridge University Press. pp. 732–733. ISBN 0-521-07233-6.
- Nunn, Christopher A. (2024). Der Bischof und die Asketinnen. Augustins Korrespondenz mit Frauen [The bishop and the ascetic women. Augustine's correspondence with women]. Jahrbuch für Antike und Christentum, Ergänzungsband Kleine Reihe 18. Münster: Aschendorff, ISBN 978-3-402-10927-4, esp. pp. 214-266 and 286-300.
- Jane Stevenson: Women Latin Poets. Oxford University Press, 2005, p. 65.
