= Anicius Hermogenianus Olybrius =

Roman senator

Anicius Hermogenianus Olybrius (fl. 395–397) was a politician and aristocrat of the Roman Empire.

== Life ==
Olybrius was a son of Sextus Petronius Probus, one of the most influential men of his era and consul in 371, and wife and cousin Anicia Faltonia Proba. His brothers were Anicius Probinus and Anicius Petronius Probus. His sister was Anicia Proba.

Olybrius was raised with his brother Probinus in Rome, where he was born. He and his brother Anicius Probinus shared the consulate in 395, while both were very young; Claudian dedicated Panegyricus de consulatu Probini et Olybrii to the brothers on this occasion. Although they belonged to a traditionally pagan senatorial family, Olybrius and Probinus were Christians.

Arusianus Messius dedicated his Exempla elocutionem to both brothers, and Quintus Aurelius Symmachus addressed a letter to both in 397 (Epistles, v).

== Family ==
He married his cousin Anicia Juliana, to whom the church father John Chrysostom wrote a letter and the church father Augustine of Hippo wrote two letters. Augustine also wrote a treatise in the form of a letter about widowhood, which was addressed to Iuliana.

Olybrius and Juliana had: one son, Anicius Probus (fl. 424-459), praetor in 424 and vir illustris in 459, married to Adelphia, daughter of Valerius Adelphius and paternal granddaughter of Valerius Adelphius Bassus (fl. 383 and 392), vir consularis and consul. Venet. in 383 and in 392, and great-granddaughter of Lucius Valerius Septimius Bassus and his possible wife Adelphia, as their son's nomina and cognomen suggest; and one daughter, Demetrias.

== Bibliography ==
- Martindale, John R.; Jones, A. H. M.; Morris, John, eds. (1971). The Prosopography of the Later Roman Empire: Volume I, AD 260–395. Cambridge: Cambridge University Press. p. 639. ISBN 0-521-07233-6.
- Hartmut Leppin, Theodosius der Große. Wissenschaftliche Buchgesellschaft, Darmstadt 2003, p. 222.

Political offices
Preceded by Arcadius; Honorius	Roman consul 395 with Anicius Probinus	Succeeded by Arcadius; Honorius
