= Clodius Celsinus Adelphius =

Politician of the Roman Empire

Clodius Celsinus Adelphius or Adelfius (fl. 333–351) was a politician of the Roman Empire.

== Life ==
He was married to the poet Faltonia Betitia Proba, and they had two sons, Quintus Clodius Hermogenianus Olybrius (consul in 379) and Faltonius Probus Alypius. His wife converted to Christianity after 353, and later Celsinus probably converted too; he probably dedicated a column ad altare majus S. Anastasiae, near the main altar of the church of Sant'Anastasia, or that was his and his wife's funerary inscription.

Before 333, Adelphius was corrector of Apulia et Calabria, with the see of his office at Beneventum, where he was a patron too. In 351 he was proconsul of an unknown province, probably Africa, and he was already married to Proba. From 7 June to 18 December 351 he is attested as praefectus urbi of Rome, under the usurper Magnentius. In this period he was accused by some Dorus of conspiring against Magnentius; it is probable that this accusation was true, as shown by the fact that Proba wrote a poem celebrating Emperor Constantius II's victory over the usurper.

== Bibliography ==
- John Bagnell Bury; et al., The Cambridge Ancient History - Volume XIII The Late Empire 337–425, Cambridge University Press, 1925. p. 21 ISBN 0-521-30200-5
- Martindale, John R.; Jones, A. H. M.; Morris, John, eds. (1971). The Prosopography of the Later Roman Empire: Volume I, AD 260–395. Cambridge: Cambridge University Press. pp. 192–193. ISBN 0-521-07233-6.

Political offices
Preceded by Caelius Probatus	Praefectus urbi of Rome; 7 June - 18 December 351	Succeeded by Lucius Aradius Valerius Proculus (II)
