= Galla (wife of Theodosius I) =

Roman empress from 387 to 394

Roman empress
- Tenure: 387–394
- Born: after 367
- Died: 394; Constantinople, Roman Empire
- Burial: Church of the Holy Apostles (possibly), Constantinople, Roman Empire
- Spouse: Theodosius I (m. 387)
- Issue: Gratian; Galla Placidia; John
- Dynasty: Valentinianic (by birth); Theodosian (by marriage)
- Father: Valentinian I
- Mother: Justina
- Religion: Nicene Christianity

Galla (died 394) was a Roman empress as the second wife of Theodosius I. She was the daughter of Valentinian I and his second wife Justina.

== Family ==
Galla's father was emperor of the West from 364 to 375, while her paternal uncle Valens ruled the East from 364 to 378. From Valentinian's previous marriage, she had a half-brother named Gratian, who succeeded his father and reigned until 383.

Galla was listed as one of four children of her parents' marriage. Her brother was Valentinian II, first co-emperor with Gratian from 375 and then the only legitimate Western Roman Emperor from 383 to his death in 392. Her two sisters were named Grata and Justa. According to Socrates Scholasticus, both remained unmarried. They were still alive in 392 but not mentioned afterwards.

== Marriage to Theodosius ==
Galla was cast into a role of significance because of conflict between three Roman emperors in the 380s. In 383, Gratian died while facing a major revolt under Magnus Maximus. Maximus proceeded to establish his control of a portion of the Roman Empire including Britain, Gaul, Hispania, and the Diocese of Africa. Ruling from his capital at Augusta Treverorum (Treves, Trier), he was able to negotiate his recognition by Valentinian II and Theodosius I starting in 384. Valentinian II's territory was effectively limited to Italia, ruling from Mediolanum (modern Milan).

In 387, the truce between Valentinian II and Maximus ended. Maximus crossed the Alps into the Po Valley and threatened Mediolanum. Valentinian and Justina fled their capital for Thessalonica, capital of the Praetorian prefecture of Illyricum and at the time the chosen residence of Theodosius. Galla accompanied them. Theodosius was then a widower, his first wife Aelia Flaccilla having died in 386.

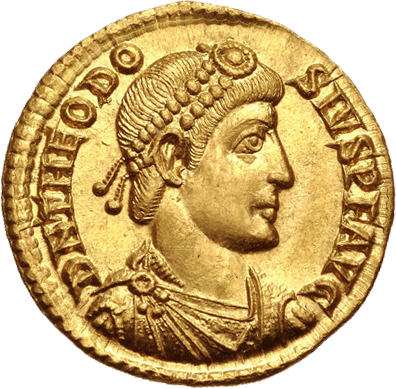
Solidus of Theodosius I

Theodosius granted refuge to the fugitives, though it took months for him to act decisively, indicating his reluctance in fighting a civil war at first. His eventual commitment to the war was explained through how it benefited him politically, as it gave him the opportunity to get rid of Maximus, the stronger member of the imperial college. As a result, he was married to Galla, while her family agreed to convert to religious orthodoxy, thus achieving a public image of dynastic and religious solidarity.

== Empress ==
When Galla married Theodosius, she became both a Roman empress and a stepmother to Theodosius’ two sons from his first marriage, Arcadius and Honorius.

In July and August of 388, the combined troops of Theodosius I and Valentinian II invaded the territory of Maximus under the leadership of Richomeres, Arbogast, Promotus, and Timasius. Maximus suffered a series of losses and surrendered in Aquileia. He was executed on 28 August 388 along with his son and nominal co-ruler Victor, although the rest of his family were spared. Justina's condition for the marriage had been met, however she died the same year, unable to witness the result of her efforts.

Theodosius spent the years 388–391 in Italia, while Galla and her stepsons remained in the Great Palace of Constantinople. According to Marcellinus Comes, Arcadius expelled her from the palace in 390. However, since Arcadius was only thirteen, that decision could as well have belonged to those who governed in his name.

When Theodosius decided to return to the East, possibly due to the conflict between Galla and Arcadius, he installed Valentinian and his court at Vienne in Gaul, away from Milan and the influence of Ambrose, and appointed Arbogast as magister militum for the Western provinces.

On May 15, 392, Valentinian was discovered hanged in his room. His death was officially reported as a suicide, but Arbogast was suspected to have had a hand in it, an accusation found in the writings of Socrates of Constantinople, Orosius, and Zosimus. Sozomen was less certain and mentioned both versions of how Valentinian II died.

Galla’s distress over her brother’s death was recorded by Zosimus and John of Antioch. On August 22 of the same year, Arbogast declared Eugenius as an emperor without the approval of Theodosius. Negotiations with Theodosius to achieve recognition were unsuccessful and, on 23 January 393, Theodosius declared his second son Honorius an Augustus, the implication being that Theodosius alone was legitimate emperor. Conflict between the two emperors began the following year, resulting in the Battle of the Frigidus, on 5–6 September 394. Theodosius was victorious and gained control of the entire Roman Empire while Arbogast committed suicide and Eugenius was executed.

Galla did not live to see the victory. She died in childbirth, before the battle had started.

== Issue ==
Galla had three children with Theodosius, two sons and a daughter:

- Gratian, born in 388-389 that died before 395;
- Galla Placidia, (392/393–27 November 450), her only child to survive to adulthood and who later became an empress in her own right. She married Ataulf, king of the Visigoths, and, after his death, Constantius III;
- John, who died with his mother in childbirth in 394.

== Sources ==
- Errington, R. Malcolm (2006). Roman Imperial Policy from Julian to Theodosius. Chapel Hill: University of North Carolina Press. ISBN 0-8078-3038-0.
- Hebblewhite, Mark (2020). Theodosius and the Limits of Empire. London: Routledge. doi:10.4324/9781315103334. ISBN 978-1-138-10298-9. S2CID 213344890.
- Holum, Kenneth G. (1982). Theodosian Empresses: Women and Imperial Dominion in Late Antiquity. Berkeley, Los Angeles and London: University of California Press. ISBN 978-0-520-04162-2.
- Jones, A.H.M.; J.R. Martindale & J. Morris (1971). Prosopography of the Later Roman Empire. Vol. 1. Cambridge University Press. ISBN 0-521-07233-6.
- McLynn, Neil B. (1994), Ambrose of Milan: Church and Court in a Christian Capital, The Transformation of the Classical Heritage, vol. 22, Berkeley: University of California Press, ISBN 978-0-520-08461-2
- Rebenich, Stefan (1985). "Gratian, a Son of Theodosius, and the Birth of Galla Placidia". Historia. 34 (3): 372–385. JSTOR 4435933.
- Williams, Stephen; Friell, Gerard (1994). Theodosius: The Empire at Bay. Yale University Press. ISBN 978-0-300-07447-5.
- Smith, William, Dictionary of Greek and Roman Biography and Mythology, ancientlibrary.com.
- Grierson, Philip; Mango, Cyril; Ševčenko, Ihor (1962). "The Tombs and Obits of the Byzantine Emperors (337–1042); With an Additional Note". Dumbarton Oaks Papers. 16: 1–63. doi:10.2307/1291157. ISSN 0070-7546.

Royal titles
Preceded by Aelia Flaccilla	Roman Empress consort 387–394	Succeeded by Aelia Eudoxia in the Eastern Roman Empire
Preceded by Aelia Flaccilla	Roman Empress consort 387–394	Succeeded by Maria, daughter of Stilicho in the Western Roman Empire
