= Proculus (prefect of Constantinople) =

Roman statesman

Proculus (died in Constantinople, November 16, 393) or Proklos (Ancient Greek: Πρόκλος) was Eparch of Constantinople during the reign of Theodosius the Great (r. 379–395. An epigram on the pedestal of an obelisk at the hippodrome of Constantinople records his success in setting the obelisk upright. A Latin translation of the epigram by Hugo Grotius is given by Fabricius.

== Biography ==
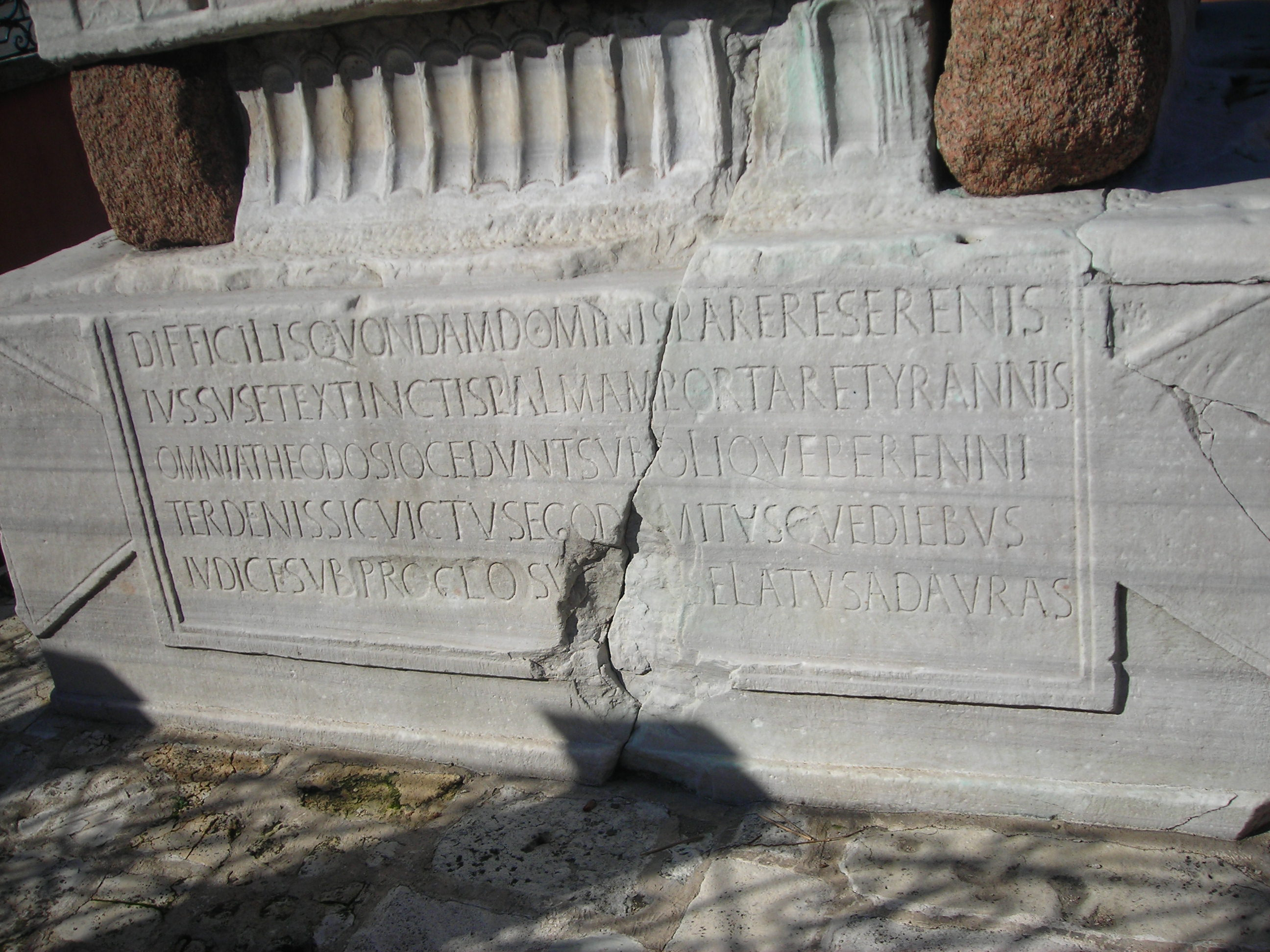
Latin legend on the Obelisk of Theodosius, celebrating the erection of the obelisk in the Hippodrome of Constantinople, performed by Proculus in 388, in occasion of Theodosius I's victory over the usurper Magnus Maximus.

Proculus was the son of Eutolmius Tatianus. He held the posts of governor of Palestine and of Phoenicia; between 383 and 384 he was Comes Orientis. During this time, his name was carved on the Commemorative stela of Nahr el-Kalb.

In 388, shortly before leaving for a campaign in the West against the usurper Magnus Maximus, Emperor Theodosius I appointed him praefectus urbi of Constantinople.

In 392 he fell into disgrace: the general and statesman Rufinus, jealous of the power of Proculus and of his father (who was praetorian prefect of the East), used his influence to launch accusations against Proculus, who went into hiding. Rufinus then coaxed Tatianus and Theodosius to pardon Proculus, who received a letter from his father asking him to return to court. Once Proculus turned up, he was captured and imprisoned. He was tried and sentenced, as Rufinus had decided, and sent to death in a suburb of Constantinople called Sykai (the Galata district of modern Istanbul); the Emperor sent a messenger to order the execution halted, but Rufinus ordered the messenger to move slowly, so that he arrived after the execution had been carried out.

His name was subject to damnatio memoriae and was erased from monuments, as, for example, the Obelisk of Theodosius in the Hippodrome of Constantinople. Later, his nephew, who came to power under the Emperor Marcian (r. 450–457), had the good name of Proculus restored, re-carving it on the obelisk.

== See also ==
- 4th century in Lebanon

== Bibliography ==
- Zosimus, Historia nea, iv.45.1, iv.52.1—4.
- Charlotte Roueché, "Section IV: Arcadius to Theodosius II, 395-450", Aphrodisias in Late Antiquity: The Late Roman and Byzantine Inscriptions
