= Neoterius =

Flavius Neoterius (fl. 365–393) was a politician of the Roman Empire. He served as Praetorian prefect of the East, of Italy, and of Gaul. In 390 he was co-consul with Valentinian II.

== Life ==
Probably born in Rome, he was notarius under Emperor Valentinian I when, in 365, he was sent to Africa to guarantee the loyalty of that province during the usurpation of Procopius, who had rebelled against the eastern Emperor Valens.

Neoterius was appointed Praetorian prefect of the East between 380 and 381.

Later he is attested as Praetorian prefect of Italy in 385. Putting Neoterius in charge of the Italian prefecture, Theodosius I wanted to support the young and inexperienced Emperor Valentinian II from the influence of the Western usurper Magnus Maximus. Neoterius is probably to be identified with the prefect who wanted to give the basilica Portiana of Milan to the Arians but who was opposed by the Nicene bishop Ambrose.

In 390 he was Praetorian prefect of Gaul, as well as consul with the Emperor Valentinian II as colleague; this appointment can be seen as protecting Theodosius' interests in Gaul.

He knew Quintus Aurelius Symmachus, with whom he exchanged letters (he is the addressee of the letters 38-46 by Symmachus); according to these letters, Neoterius was alive in 393 and maybe in 398.

== Sources ==
- Martindale, John R.; Jones, A. H. M.; Morris, John, eds. (1971). "Flavius Neoterius". The Prosopography of the Later Roman Empire: Volume I, AD 260–395. Cambridge: Cambridge University Press. p. 623. ISBN 0-521-07233-6.

| Preceded by Flavius Timasius, Flavius Promotus | Consul of the Roman Empire; 390 with Flavius Valentinianus Iunior Augustus IV | Succeeded by Flavius Eutolmius Tatianus, Quintus Aurelius Symmachus |
| Preceded by Quintus Clodius Hermogenianus Olybrius | Praetorian prefect of the East; 380-381 | Succeeded by unk. |
| Preceded by unk. | Praetorian prefect of Italy; 385 | Succeeded by unk. |
| Preceded by Constantinianus | Praetorian prefect of Gaul; 390 | Succeeded by unk. |
