= Flavius Valentinianus =

Flavius Valentinianus may refer to any of the following Roman emperors:

- Valentinian I
- Valentinian II
- Valentinian III
