= Rufinus (consul) =

Roman statesman

Flavius Rufinus (Greek: Φλάβιος Ῥουφῖνος; c. 335 – 27 November 395) was a 4th-century Eastern Roman statesman of Aquitanian extraction who served as Praetorian prefect of the East for the emperor Theodosius I, as well as for his son Arcadius, under whom Rufinus exercised significant influence in the state affairs.

He was the subject of the verse invective In Rufinum by the western court poet Claudian.

== Life ==
Rufinus is described as tall, always in movement, acute, ambitious, greedy, and without principles, although a rigorous Christian. His difficulty with the Greek language is recorded by the sources, as well as his Aquitanian origin.

In 388 he was appointed magister officiorum. In 392 he served as Roman consul and in that same year he was appointed as Praetorian prefect of the East. Upon his appointment, he retained the responsibilities of the magister officiorum. In order to become prefect, Rufinus is said to have persuaded the emperor that Eutolmius Tatianus, the current occupant of the position, and his son Proculus, the prefect of Constantinople, committed corruption. Proculus was executed while his father was banished.

Emperor Theodosius trusted Rufinus, and he used this influence to fight his opponents at the court. He came into conflict with Promotus and Timasius, respectively Theodosius' magister equitum and magister peditum. During a meeting of the council, Rufinus insulted Promotus, who slapped him; Rufinus went to Theodosius to report the affront, and Theodosius replied that if nothing changed he would have Rufinus appointed co-emperor. Taking advantage of the imperial support, Rufinus suggested Theodosius send Promotus to Thrace, where he would be entrusted with the training of the troops. Some barbarians followed Promotus in his journey, but, having an agreement with Rufinus, they suddenly attacked and killed Promotus (September 392).

During the period immediately after Theodosius' death, in January 395, Rufinus was virtually the ruler of the Eastern Roman Empire, as he exercised great influence over the young Emperor Arcadius. An account by the Roman poet Claudian stated that he attempted to further join himself to Arcadius by marrying his daughter to the young emperor. This plan was stymied by another of the imperial ministers, Eutropius. This official, who held the position of chamberlain, arranged instead a marriage with Aelia Eudoxia, who was a child of one of Rufinus' opponents.

Rufinus hated the western magister militum Flavius Stilicho. During the Revolt of Alaric I Rufinus had opposite interests and opposed him. Stilicho claimed that Theodosius ordered that Stilicho would be given guardianship over both Arcadius and the western Emperor Honorius. Rufinus disputed his power, and maintained strong influence over Arcadius. Rufinus's influence over Arcadius prevented Stilicho from crushing Alaric when he had the chance. Stilicho had trapped Alaric and the Visigoths in Greece (395), but his Eastern troops were commanded by Arcadius, who, at Rufinus' suggestion, recalled them, so that Stilicho was forced to withdraw his forces west across the border. However, under Gainas, the same Gothic mercenaries he had recalled killed Rufinus on 27 November 395.

Rufinus had a sister, Silvia, a devout pilgrim recorded in Palladius' Lausiac History.

== Sources ==
- John Bagnell Bury, History of the Later Roman Empire, Chapter 5.

Political offices
Preceded by Eutolmius Tatianus; Q. Aurelius Symmachus	Roman consul 392 with Arcadius Augustus II	Succeeded by Theodosius Augustus II; Abundantius
Preceded by Eutolmius Tatianus	Praetorian prefect of the East; 392–395	Succeeded by Caesarius
