= Maternus Cynegius =

Roman bureaucrat

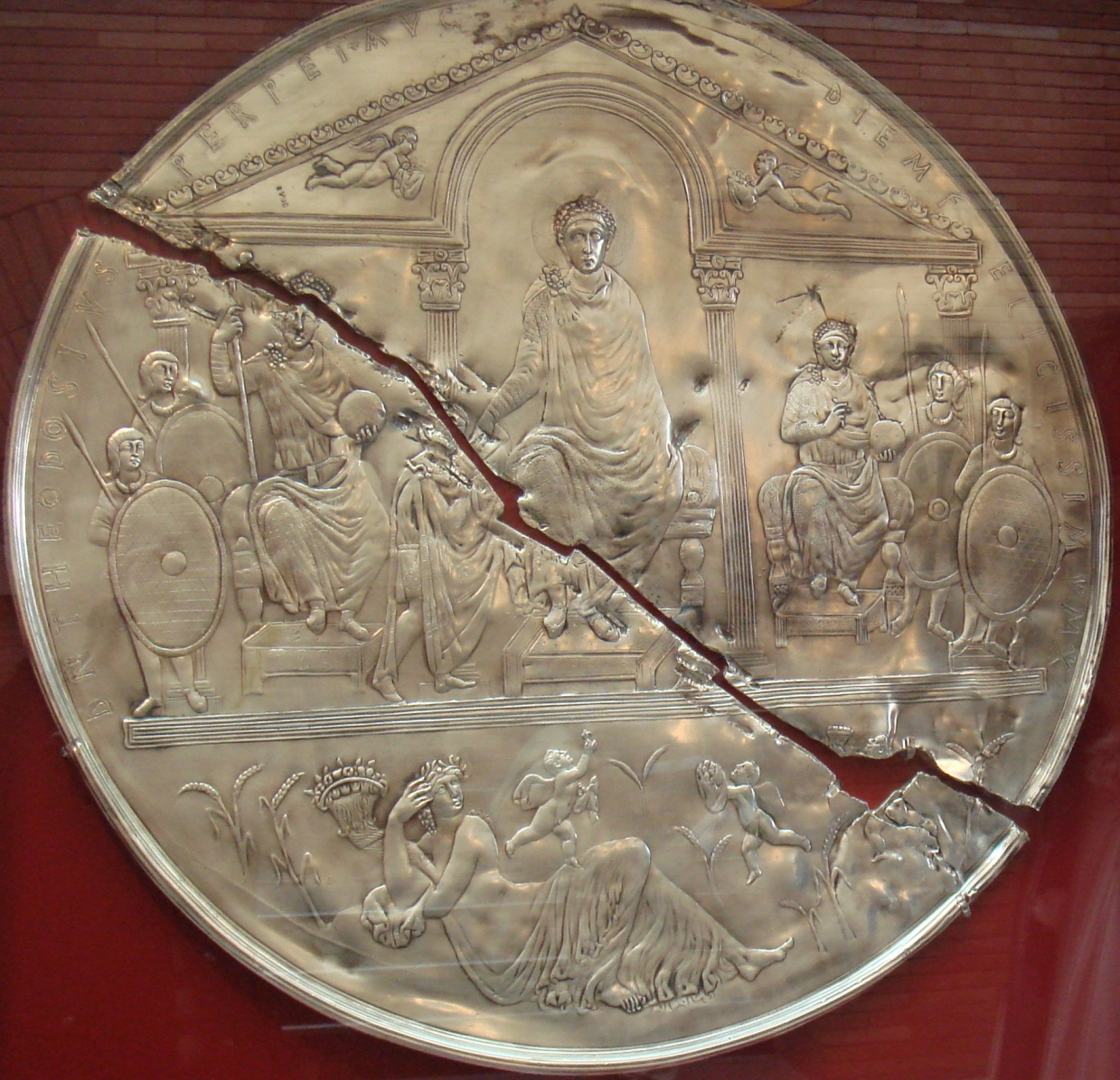
- Replica of Theodosius' Missorium in the National Museum of Roman Art, Mérida.
- Born: 4th century Hispania, Roman Empire
- Died: 388; Berytus, Roman Empire
- Resting place: Hispania
- Occupation: politician
- Office: Praetorian prefect (384–388); Consul (388)
- Children: Probably had descendants

Maternus Cynegius (died 388) was a Roman bureaucrat and close confidant of the emperor Theodosius I. He held the offices of praetorian prefect of the East (384–388) and consul (388), and has been widely blamed by historians for instigating the widespread destruction of pagan temples and shrines throughout the eastern Roman provinces. Some recent authors, however, have questioned his role in events and his overall reputation as a Christian fanatic and temple destroyer.

== Biography ==
Maternus Cynegius is usually thought to be a native of Hispania, deduced from the fact that his body was sent there to be buried. (Note: His Greek surname, Cynegius, has also led to suggestions that he was an easterner, but this has not found much favor.) He also seems to have belonged to the extended circle of relatives and intimates of the emperor Theodosius I, who was likewise a Spaniard. All of Cynegius's recorded career shows him holding the highest court rank (illustris) and offices under that emperor, which has led scholars to deduce that his connection to Theodosius earned him a quick promotion to these honors. On the other hand, a dedicatory inscription records that Cynegius held all grades of honors in the civil hierarchy, which led historian McLynn to infer that he had some experience under previous emperors, and that it was this which recommended him to Theodosius.

Cynegius is first securely attested in the spring of 383 serving as Theodosius's treasurer (comes sacrarum largitionum). Within a few months, he was appointed to the office of quaestor sacri palatii and, shortly afterwards (January 384), praetorian prefect of the East, with the task of replenishing the undermanned municipal councils (curiae) of the eastern provinces, as well as, according to the 6th-century historian Zosimus, closing pagan temples and suppressing worship of the gods therein. Cynegius's ensuing tour of the east brought him to Egypt, probably in late 386, where he announced at Alexandria that Theodosius had recognized the military usurper Maximus as a legitimate emperor. Rewarded by his services with the consulship in 388, Cynegius died early in the same year, either at Constantinople or on the return journey there from Egypt. He was interred at the Church of the Holy Apostles on 19 March 388, but his widow, named Achantia, sent his body to Hispania a year later.

Known administrative measures which Cynegius helped implement while in office include laws aimed at filling vacant seats in city councils and punishing the neglection of curial duties by local officials, as well as the building of city walls and other public works at Antioch. He is also the nominal addressee, and thus probable instigator, of a decree that renewed a prohibition on the pagan practice of haruspicy, as well as several laws against heretics and Jews. Those in the latter group, in particular, have been said to display a conspicuous 'anti-Jewish tendency contrary to Theodosius's usual policy'.

Cynegius has been identified with the high official who received the Missorium of Theodosius I and was probably depicted on it. A country house found by archaeologists near Carranque in Spain has been attributed to Cynegius.

=== Anti-pagan activities and reputation ===
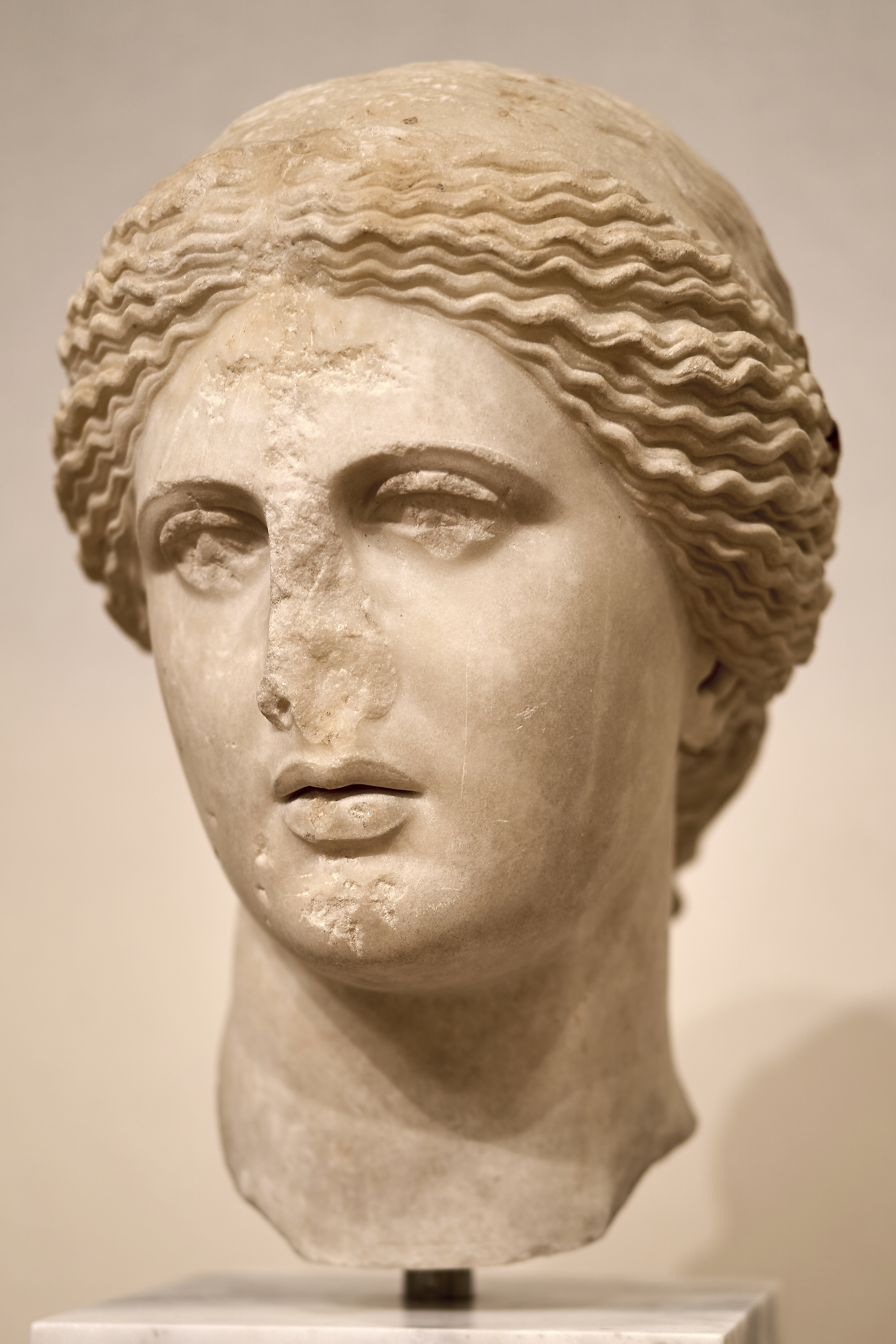
Statue of the Greek goddess Aphrodite with a cross carved into its forehead. Cynegius was a staunch proponent of the eradication of paganism in the Roman Empire.

Maternus Cynegius has received widespread attention and notoriety in scholarship due to evidence that he instigated numerous acts of vandalism against pagan shrines throughout the east. The evidence from ancient sources is listed as follows.

- The 6th-century Greek historian Zosimus, a pagan, blames Cynegius for the systematic closure of temples and suppression of traditional rituals throughout the east while en route to, and then in, Egypt. A similar story is told by the Consularia Constantinopolitana, a Latin-language almanac issued at Constantinople.
- The Antiochene rhetor Libanius, a pagan and contemporary of events, reports a series of outrages committed against pagan shrines in Syria during Cynegius's term of office, and specifically denounces an unnamed official (usually identified as Cynegius himself) who, at his wife's instigation, destroyed a temple in Osroene (likely at Carrhae or perhaps Edessa) without the emperor's permission.
- The 5th-century ecclesiastical historian Theodoret reports an unidentified eastern governor's attempt to demolish a temple of Zeus at Apameia, Syria, with the aid of the local bishop, Marcellus.

Zosimus's explicit mention of Cynegius and the contemporary actions reported by Libanius and Theodoret have led many authors, like Otto Seeck, John Matthews and those of the Prosopography of the Later Roman Empire, to attribute the main responsibility for the disturbances to Cynegius. Paul Petit, following Libanius, portrays Cynegius as encouraging bands of monks to destroy rural shrines across the east, coordinating operations while based at Antioch in 385–386, though Petit identifies the vandal of Theodoret as a different, lower ranking official instead. In 1982, Polish archeologist Barbara Gassowska tentatively ascribed the demise of the temple of Al-Lat in Palmyra to Cynegius. Olszaniec takes for granted that Cynegius was the official described by Libanius and that he was acting at the behest of emperor Theodosius.

In 2005, Neil McLynn cast doubt on Cynegius's reputation as a destroyer of temples, arguing that the accounts of Zosimus, Libanius and Theodoret are too disparate or unreliable for them to be securely conflated into a single narrative. McLynn takes Theodoret's anecdote to be highly rhetorical and unreliable, and also believes that Libanius's narrative is inconsistent with the zealot official, who is never explicitly named, being Cynegius or any other of such high rank. Furthermore, whereas Libanius has his unnamed subject destroy shrines throughout Syria, Zosimus reports that Cynegius merely closed temples, and that his actions climaxed instead at Alexandria, Egypt. McLynn gives reasons to believe that Zosimus's account, along with the similar notice in the Latin almanac titled Consularia Constantinopolitana (which was probably Zosimus's own source), overstate Cynegius's role, which in the end may have been very minor or even symbolic. McLynn's conclusions have been endorsed or at least positively acknowledged by a number of scholars.

== Family ==
A sepulchral monument at Raphanea, Syria, was set up to one woman named Materna Cynegia, her sister Antonia Cassia and daughter Herennia. Judging by the name of the former, they must have been related to Maternus Cynegius, and are perhaps his daughters. He was also probably related to Aemilius Florus Paternus, governor of Africa in 393, who had a son called Cynegius, as well as with Aemilia Materna Thermantia, grandniece of the emperor Theodosius and wife of Honorius. The praetorian prefect, furthermore, was presumably related to the Cynegius whom the empress Aelia Eudoxia sent against the temple of Zeus Marnas at Gaza in 401.

== Citations ==
Preceded by Valentinian Augustus III; Eutropius	Roman consul 388 with Theodosius Augustus II	Succeeded by Timasius; Promotus
Preceded by Domitius Modestus	Praetorian prefect of the East; 384–388	Succeeded by Eutolmius Tatianus
