= Victor (emperor) =

Roman emperor from 384 or 387 to 388

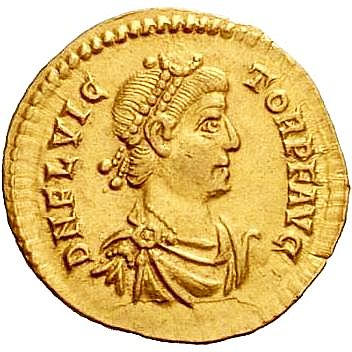
- Obverse of a Solidus of Victor, inscribed: d n fl victor p f aug

Roman emperor
- Reign: 383/384 or 387 – August 388
- Predecessor: Gratian
- Successor: Valentinian II
- Co-emperor: Magnus Maximus
- Died: 388 (shortly after 28 August); Trier
Names
- Flavius Victor (Note: From the fourth century, emperors and other high-profile men of non-aristocratic birth often bore the name "Flavius", the family name of the Constantinian dynasty. It was often used as a status marker rather than personal name.)
- Father: Magnus Maximus
- Mother: Saint Elen (traditional)
- Religion: Nicene Christianity

Victor, also known as Flavius Victor (died shortly after 28 August 388 AD) was a Western Roman emperor from either 383/384 or 387 to August 388. He was the son of the magister militum Magnus Maximus, who had become a usurper of the Western Roman Empire, in opposition to Gratian.

Maximus rose up in 383, and was recognized as the legitimate emperor in the west by Theodosius I. Victor was elevated to augustus of the Western Roman Empire in either 383/384 or mid-387, making him co-emperor with his father. Maximus invaded Italy in 387, to depose Valentinian II, the brother and successor of the late Gratian. Because of Maximus' invasion, Theodosius invaded the Western Empire in 388. Theodosius defeated Maximus in two battles in Pannonia, before crushing his army at Aquileia, and capturing Maximus. Maximus was executed on 28 August 388. His death was followed quickly by that of Victor, who was executed in Trier by the Frankish general Arbogast. If Saint Elen is believed to be Victor's mother, Victor would be the only Roman emperor with British heritage.

== History ==
Flavius Victor was born at an unknown date, to Magnus Maximus, the magister militum per Gallias ('Master of the Soldiers in Gaul'), and future usurper of the Western Roman Empire. Maximus was declared emperor April 383 AD while in Britain, in opposition to Gratian. Maximus held control over both Gaul and Spain, and was recognized by Theodosius I, the Eastern Roman Emperor, as the true Western Roman Emperor.

Victor was elevated to augustus of the Western Roman Empire either 383/384 or mid-387, (Note: Sources do not mention the exact date of his proclamation, but it was certainly after August 383, as he’s not mentioned in Maximus’ first documents as emperor. Some historians date his elevation to 387, probably because most of his coins were minted in Italy.) making him co-emperor with his father Magnus Maximus. It is considered highly likely that Maximus had the intent of establishing a dynasty.

Magnus Maximus invaded Italy in late 387, in order to depose Valentinian II, the brother of Gratian. He gained control of Italy, although he failed to capture Valentinian, who fled to Thessalonica in the Eastern Roman Empire. Once there, Valentinian sent multiple appeals to Theodosius, although for several months they were ignored. Theodosius I then agreed to restore Valentinian II to the throne, although the reasoning for this is disputed. Rufinus says that Valentinian agreed to convert to Orthodoxy, whereas Eunapius says that Valentinian offered his sister, Galla, in marriage to Theodosius, whose wife had recently died, in exchange for assistance in regaining the throne. News that Theodosius was marching to invade the Western Roman Empire arrived in late spring 388, leading Maximus to rush to put together a defence force. His army was defeated twice in Pannonia, at Siscia and Poetovio, before retreating to Italy, where they were crushed in battle on 28 August 388, near Aquileia. During this battle, Maximus himself was captured, and quickly beheaded. Victor, who was still in Gaul, was executed in Trier by the Frankish general Arbogast in the same month.
