= Eutolmius Tatianus =

Flavius Eutolmius Tatianus (Ancient Greek: Φλαούιος Εὐτόλμιος Τατιανὸς; fl. 357–392) was a Senator of the Late Roman Empire. Born in Sidyma, Lycia, by the 360s Tatianus was governor of the Thebaid. He governed Egypt, from 370 was comes Orientis, and from 374 was comes sacrarum largitionum. In 388 he was appointed Praetorian prefect of the East, and in 392 was removed from that role and arrested; he was later exiled.

== Biography ==
=== Initial career ===
The family of Eutolmii originated in Syria; Tatianus was born in Sidyma, son of Antonius Tatianus, praeses (governor) of Caria from c. 360 to 364. He had a son, Proculus, who followed his footsteps into a political career.

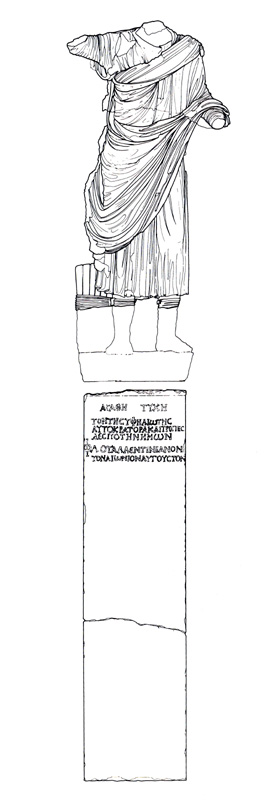
Drawing of a statue of Valentinian II, erected in Aphrodisias by order of Tatianus

Tatianus began his career during the governorship of his father. Around 357 he was a lawyer, then he was assessor (legal counsel) of a governor, a vicarius, a proconsul and twice prefect. In the 360s he was praeses Thebaidos (governor of the Thebaid); between 367 and 370 he was praefectus augustalis in Egypt; from 370 to 374 he administered the Diocese of the East as comes Orientis and from 374 to 380 he held the office of comes sacrarum largitionum in the imperial financial administration. According to John of Nikiû, he built two stone gates with enormous labour for the passage of the Nile at a place called Abrakjun, likely near Alexandria. After working for a year under Theodosius I, Tatianus left his place to retire for the next eight years in Lycia; it is not clear whether it was due to the pressure of imperial favourites, brought by the new Emperor from the West.

=== Praetorian prefect of the East ===
On 16 June 388, shortly before his departure for the campaign against the usurper Magnus Maximus, Theodosius I appointed Tatianus Praetorian prefect of the East, succeeding Maternus Cynegius, a Spaniard like Theodosius, who had died recently; after having sent the insignia of power to Tatianus in Lycia, the Emperor appointed Proculus praefectus urbi of Constantinople.

Some laws of this period have been preserved, which Tatianus would abide in the absence of Theodosius (the Emperor returned to the East only in the autumn of 391) to pursue his own policy, somewhat anti-clerical; nonetheless, it is not possible to speak of a change of policy in favour of the Pagans. It should however be considered that in 391 Tatianus was consul together with Quintus Aurelius Symmachus, another member of the Pagan aristocracy.

=== Fall ===
Tatianus's fall was caused by his conflict with the powerful general and politician Rufinus. Rufinus, consul in 392, feared the power of Tatianus and his son Proculus, as the two of them held both the Praetorian prefecture of the East and the urban prefecture: such concentration of power in the hands of father and son caused the envy of powerful men. Rufinus took advantage of some mistakes of Tatianus in the administration of finances, to depose and arrest him and to succeed him as prefect (September 392). Tatianus was later sent into exile, probably in Lycia, and he was hit by damnatio memoriae. The fall of Tatianus also involved his son Proculus, who was sentenced to death.

The last years of the reign of Theodosius were characterized by a growing intolerance against Paganism; perhaps the fall of Tatianus is to be interpreted in this context.

== Bibliography ==
- Zosimus, Historia nea, iv.45.1, iv.52.1—4.
- Martindale, John R.; Jones, A. H. M.; Morris, John, eds. (1971). "Tatianus 5". The Prosopography of the Later Roman Empire: Volume I, AD 260–395. Cambridge: Cambridge University Press. pp. 876–878. ISBN 0-521-07233-6.
- Charlotte Roueché, Aphrodisias in Late Antiquity: The Late Roman and Byzantine Inscriptions, King's College London , iii.25—30.
- Scharf, Ralf, "Die Familie des Fl. Eutolmius Tatianus", Zeitschrift für Papyrologie und Epigraphik, num. 85, 1991, pp. 223–231 (PDF).

Political offices
Preceded by Valentinian Augustus IV; Neoterius	Roman consul 391 with Q. Aurelius Symmachus	Succeeded by Arcadius Augustus II; Rufinus
Preceded by Postumianus	Praetorian prefect of the East; 388–392	Succeeded by Rufinus
