= Promotus =

Flavius Promotus was a Roman general who served under Theodosius I until his death in 391 AD. In 386 he had a command in Africa, and was magister peditum for Thrace. In 388 he was made magister equitum, and the following year was consul. He was killed in an ambush organised by Rufinus, a rival for Theodosius' favour.

== Career ==
In 386 he had a command in Africa. Later the same year, he was magister peditum per Thracias. The Greuthungi of King Odotheus gathered on the north bank of the Danube and asked for admission to the Empire, presumably on the same terms as the Tervingi ten years previously. Promotus deployed his forces along the south bank and despatched some men to trick them by pretending to want payment to betray the Romans, but they in fact reported the plan to Promotus. When the Greuthungi attempted to cross the river, instead of a sleeping camp they were confronted with a fleet of river-craft which proceeded to sink all the enemy canoes. Claudian says the island of Peuce was heaped high with bodies and the river mouths ran red with blood. Theodosius, who was nearby, freed the surviving Goths hoping to use them in his coming campaign against Magnus Maximus.

In 388, Promotus was promoted to magister equitum in preparation for the campaign against Maximus. He presumably did well in the campaign, for he was rewarded with the consulship in 389. While Theodosius was travelling back to the East through Thessalonica and having various adventures, Promotus saved him from a barbarian attack, and may have been rewarded for this with a higher command.

== Death ==
Soon afterwards, the emperor began to favour Rufinus, then magister officiorum, which angered Promotus—indeed, they had a fistfight in public. Rufinus then persuaded Theodosius to send Promotus out on exercises with the troops, and sent a company of barbarians who ambushed and killed him.

Promotus had two sons who were raised with the emperor's children, who, in revenge for their father's murder, helped Eutropius thwart Rufinus' plan to marry his daughter to the emperor Arcadius.

== Notes ==
| Preceded by Magnus Maximus Augustus II (West), Theodosius Augustus II (East), Maternus Cynegius (East) | Roman consul 389 with Flavius Timasius | Succeeded by Valentinianus junior Augustus IV; Flavius Neoterius |
