= Timasius =

General of the Roman Empire

Flavius Timasius (died 396) was a general of the Roman Empire, a relative of the Empress Aelia Flaccilla, wife of Emperor Theodosius I (r. 379–395).

== Biography ==
Timasius was a Roman officer, serving under the command of Emperor Valens (r. 364–378), who survived the Battle of Adrianople (378), in which the Roman emperor lost his life. Emperor Theodosius I appointed Timasius magister equitum in 386 and magister peditum in 388. During his tenure as magister militum praesentalis (386–395), Timasius was made a consul, along with Promotus, in 389. In 391, he followed Theodosius in the campaign against the barbarians in Macedonia. In that same year, Theodosius was on the verge of annihilating some barbarian units that were hiding in Roman territory when Timasius told him that the troops needed food and rest; the Roman soldiers, numbed into a slumber by too much food and drink, were taken by surprise and even Theodosius was almost taken prisoner. When Theodosius returned to Constantinople, there was a clash between Timasius and his colleague Promotus and the powerful Rufinus; Theodosius sided with Rufinus, who arranged for Promotus' death.

Timasius also fought in the Battle of the Frigidus of 394, against the usurper Eugenius, as commander-in-chief of the Roman troops, but with the collaboration of Stilicho. After the victory, he returned to the East.

In 395, Theodosius died and his son Arcadius (r. 383–408) had succeeded him on the Eastern throne. The following year, Timasius was the victim of a purge of Theodosius's generals orchestrated by the powerful eunuch Eutropius to get rid of potential opponents. Eutropius specifically forced Bargus, a Syrian sausage-seller brought by Timasius from Sardis and later made tribunus(?) of the East, to falsely accuse Timasius of high treason. As a result, Timasius was put on trial and the judge, Saturninus, exiled him in 396 to the Kharga Oasis of the Libyan Desert. Slightly conflicting accounts report that Timasius was either unable to escape from the oasis or that his attempted escape led him to his death on the border between Egypt and Libya.

Timasius had a wife named Pentadia and a son named Syagrius.

== Sources ==
- Burns, Thomas S. (1994). Barbarians within the Gates of Rome: A Study of Roman Military Policy and the Barbarians, ca. 375–425 A.D. Bloomington, Indiana: Indiana University Press. ISBN 0-253-31288-4.
- Bury, John Bagnell (1958) [1923]. History of the Later Roman Empire: From the Death of Theodosius I to the Death of Justinian, Volume 2. Mineola, New York: Dover Publications. OCLC 41478187.
- Jackson, Robert B. (2002). At Empire's Edge: Exploring Rome's Egyptian Frontier. New Haven, Connecticut: Yale University Press. ISBN 0-300-08856-6.
- Martindale, John R., ed. (1980). The Prosopography of the Later Roman Empire: Volume II, AD 395–527. Cambridge: Cambridge University Press. ISBN 0-521-20159-4.
- Matthews, John Frederick (1975). Western Aristocracies and Imperial Court, A.D. 364-425. Oxford, United Kingdom: Clarendon Press. ISBN 9780198148173.
- Smith, William (1849). Dictionary of Greek and Roman Biography and Mythology. London, United Kingdom: Taylor, Walton, Maberly.

Preceded by Magnus Maximus Augustus II (West), Theodosius Augustus II (East), Maternus Cynegius (East)	Roman consul 389 with Flavius Promotus	Succeeded by Valentinianus junior Augustus IV; Flavius Neoterius
