= Valentinian II =

Roman emperor from 375 to 392

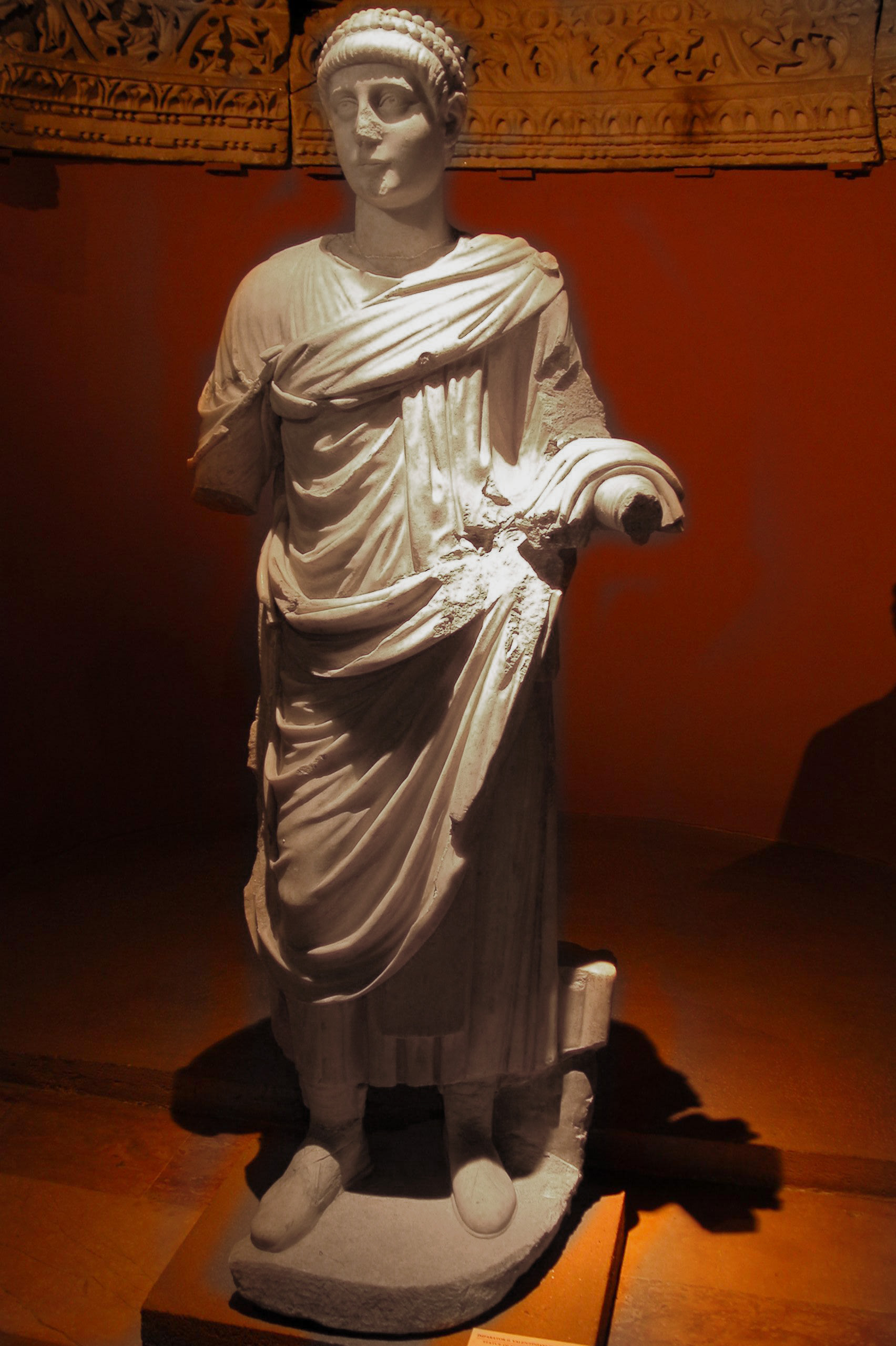
- Marble statue of an emperor found in Aphrodisias, usually identified as Valentinian II (Note: The statue was found near two columnar bases made under prefect Eutolmius Tatianus (388–392) and dedicated to Valentinian II and Arcadius respectively. It is usually identified as Valentinian, although it "seems to have been found closer to the base of Arcadius". Valentinian was 17 years old in 388, while Arcadius was only 11.)

Roman emperor
- Reign: 22 November 375 – 15 May 392 (senior from 28 August 388)
- Predecessor: Valentinian I
- Successor: Eugenius and Theodosius I
- Co-rulers: Valens (East, 375–378); Gratian (375–383); Theodosius I (East, 379–392); Arcadius (East, 383–392); Magnus Maximus (383–388); Victor (383/384–388)
- Born: 371; Augusta Treverorum, Gallia Belgica, Western Roman Empire
- Died: 15 May 392 (aged 21); Vienne, Viennensis, Western Roman Empire
Regnal name
- Imperator Caesar Flavius Valentinianus Augustus
- Dynasty: Valentinian
- Father: Valentinian I
- Mother: Justina
- Religion: Arianism

Valentinian II (Latin: Valentinianus; 371 – 15 May 392) was a Roman emperor in the western part of the Roman Empire between AD 375 and 392. He was at first junior co-ruler of his half-brother, then was sidelined by a usurper, and finally became sole ruler after 388, albeit with limited de facto powers. He was the youngest emperor (co-ruler) in the Western Roman Empire (aged 4).

A son of emperor Valentinian I and empress Justina, he was raised to the imperial office at the age of four by military commanders upon his father's death. Until 383, Valentinian II remained a junior partner to his older half-brother Gratian in ruling the Western empire, while the East was governed by his uncle Valens until 378 and Theodosius I from 379. When the usurper emperor Magnus Maximus killed Gratian in 383, the court of Valentinian II in Milan became the locus of confrontations between adherents to Nicene and Arian Christianity. In 387, Maximus invaded Italy, spurring Valentinian II and his family to escape to Thessalonica where they successfully sought Theodosius's aid. Theodosius defeated Maximus in battle and re-installed Valentinian II.

Valentinian II ruled from Gaul after being restored to power in 388. He was largely under the control of Arbogast, a powerful general and regent. In 392, Valentinian II was found dead in his palace, a death some at the time believed was a suicide and others a murder orchestrated by Arbogast, whom the emperor had tried to dismiss.

== Early life and accession (371–375) ==
He was born Valentinianus to Emperor Valentinian I and his second wife Justina. His paternal half-brother Gratian had been sharing the imperial title with their father since 367. He had three sisters: Galla, Grata, and Justa.

The elder Valentinian died on campaign in Pannonia in 375. Neither Gratian (then in Trier) nor his uncle Valens (emperor of the East) were consulted by the army commanders on the scene. The four-year-old Valentinianus and his mother Justina were living in Sirmium or an imperial villa near Carnuntum.

Valentinian I's leading generals and officials did not acknowledge Gratian as his father's successor. These officials—among them Merobaudes, Petronius Probus, Equitius and Cerealis (Valentinianus's maternal uncle), instead had the four-year-old Valentinianus brought to Aquincum where they named him augustus Valentinian II on 22 November 375.

The army and its Frankish general Merobaudes were likely concerned about Gratian's limited military skills and—to prevent a split within its ranks—elevated the four-year-old to emperor, with the generals assuming that they themselves would take command.

Merobaudes may have also wanted to prevent rivals such as Sebastianus and Count Theodosius (not to be confused with Emperor Theodosius I) from becoming emperor or gaining independent power; within a year of Valentinian's elevation, Sebastianus was removed to a distant posting and Count Theodosius was executed.

== Reign from Milan (375–387) ==
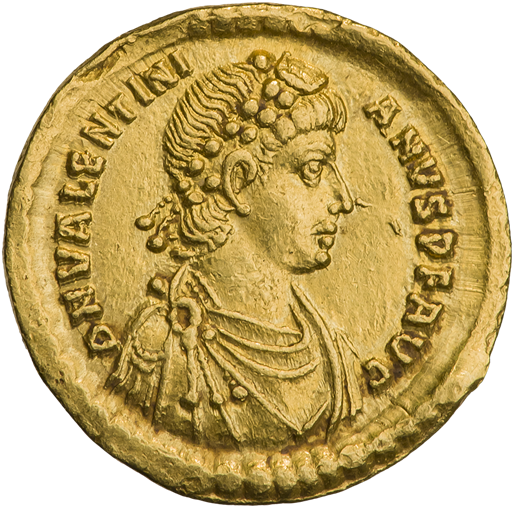
Solidus of Valentinian II

Gratian was forced to accommodate the generals who supported his half-brother; he purportedly enjoyed seeing to Valentinian's education. According to Zosimus, Gratian governed the trans-alpine provinces including Gaul, Hispania, and Britain; Valentinian was nominally ruler of Italy (part of Illyricum) and North Africa. In fact, however, Gratian governed the whole Western empire; Valentinian was marginalized and did not issue any laws. In 378 their uncle Emperor Valens was killed by the Goths in Adrianople; Gratian invited the general Theodosius to be emperor in the East. As a child, Valentinian II was under the pro-Arian influence of his mother the empress Justina and of the courtiers at Milan. Such influence was opposed by the Nicene bishop of Milan, Ambrose.

In 383, Magnus Maximus, commander of the armies in Britain, declared himself Emperor and established his headquarters in Gaul and Hispania. Gratian was killed while fleeing him. As a lesser partner in the West, Valentinian was largely ineffectual and obscure until the usurpation by Maximus and death of Gratian. For a time the court of Valentinian, through the mediation of Ambrose, came to an accommodation with the usurper, and Theodosius recognized Maximus as co-emperor of the West.

Valentinian tried to restrain the despoiling of pagan Roman temples. In 384 the pagan senators, led by the Prefect of Rome Aurelius Symmachus, petitioned the emperor for the restoration of the Altar of Victory in the Senate House which had been removed by Gratian in 382. Valentinian refused the request and, in so doing, rejected the traditions and rituals of pagan Rome to which Symmachus had appealed. While Ambrose participated in the campaign against the reinstatement of Altar of Victory, he admitted he was not the cause of the decision to remove the altar in the first place.

In 385 Ambrose refused an imperial order to hand over the Portian Basilica (now the Basilica of San Vittore al Corpo) for the celebration of Easter by the Imperial court. His refusal angered not just Valentinian but also Justina, high-ranking officials, and court Arians including Goths. Ambrose argued in his letter that Justina influenced her young son to oppose the Nicean party championed by Ambrose, and framed her motivation as purely selfish.

But the wider imperial court also opposed Ambrose's claim, and the praetorian prefect and the emperor's counsellors demanded that he turn over the basilica. When Ambrose was summoned to the court for punishment the orthodox populace rioted. Gothic troops attempted to enter the Basilica; Ambrose stood in the doorway, and the Goths did not enter. Rufinus claimed that when Ambrose was found guilty of breaking the new laws Justina persuaded Valentinian to have him banished, and that Ambrose barricaded himself within the walls of the Basilica, with the enthusiastic backing of the people. Rufinus says that the imperial troops besieged Ambrose but he held on, and that he found the bodies of two ancient Christian martyrs beneath the foundations of the church which raised the spirits of the people. Magnus Maximus tried to use the emperor's heterodoxy against him in a war of public opinion. To this end, he wrote a scathing missive attacking Valentinian for plotting against God.

In 386 to 387, Maximus crossed the Alps into the Po valley to threaten Milan. Valentinian II and Justina fled to Emperor Theodosius I in Thessalonica. The latter came to an agreement, cemented by his marriage to Valentinian's sister Galla, to restore the young emperor in the West. Theodosius and his forces marched west in 388 and defeated Maximus.

== Reign from Vienne (388–392) ==
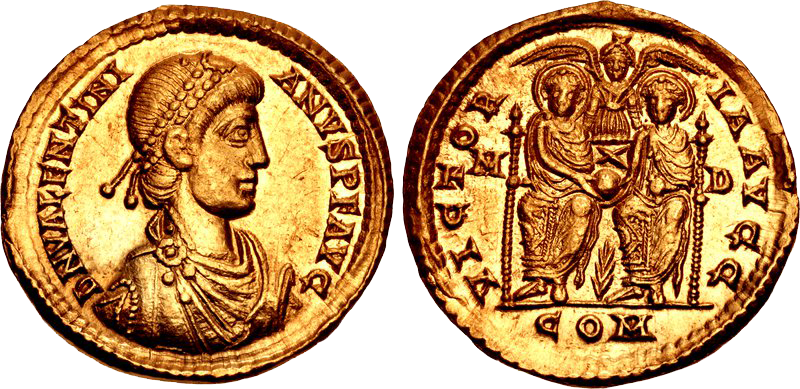
A solidus minted by Valentinian II in AD 390. On the reverse, both Valentinian and Theodosius I are celebrated as victorious.

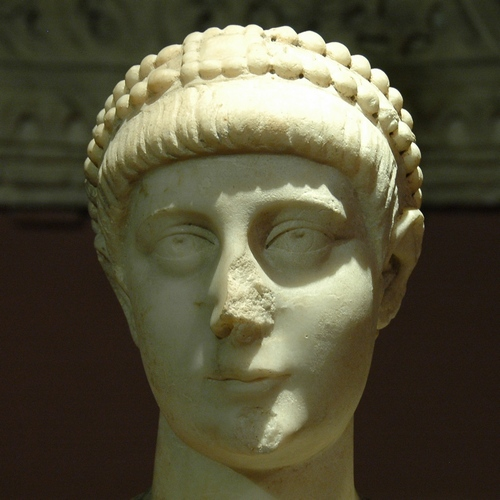
Close-up of the Aphrodisias statue.

After the defeat of Maximus, Valentinian took no part in Theodosius' triumphal celebrations. He and his court were installed at Vienne in Gaul. In a panegyric for Theodosius, the orator Pacatus asserted that the empire belonged to his two sons, Arcadius and Honorius, while barely mentioning the newly restored Valentinian. Theodosius remained in Milan until 391, appointing his supporters to important offices in the West. On the Eastern emperor's coinage, Valentinian continued to be represented with the "unbroken" legend like Arcadius, depicting both of them as Theodosius' junior colleagues. Modern scholars, observing Theodosius' actions, suspect that he had no intention of allowing Valentinian to rule, due to his plan for his sons to succeed him.

When Theodosius decided to return to the East, his trusted general, the Frank Arbogast, was appointed magister militum for the Western provinces (bar Africa) and guardian of Valentinian. There was no one in a position to counterbalance Arbogast’s influence; Justina had already died, and Vienne was far away from the influence of Ambrose. The historian Sulpicius Alexander described the extent of his control over Valentinian II and his court:

While events of various sorts were taking place in the East throughout Thrace, the public order was disturbed in Gaul. Valentinian the emperor was shut up in Vienne in the palace, and reduced almost below the position of a private person, and the military command was given over to the Frankish allies, and even the civil offices fell under the control of Arbogast's faction, and no one of all the oathbound soldiery was found to dare to heed the familiar speech or obey the command of the emperor.

Arbogast once refused to allow Valentinian to lead a military expedition against barbarian invaders that were threatening Italy. His domination over the emperor was to the point where, in a report that Mark Hebblewhite characterized as "admittedly outlandish"; the general is described as murdering Harmonius, a friend of Valentinian suspected of taking bribes, in the emperor's presence. Valentinian wrote to Theodosius and Ambrose complaining of his subordination to his general. In explicit rejection of his earlier Arianism, he invited Ambrose to come to Vienne to baptize him.

The crisis reached a peak when Valentinian attempted to formally dismiss Arbogast. The latter ignored the order, publicly tearing it up and arguing that Valentinian had not appointed him in the first place. The reality of where the power lay was openly displayed.

== Death ==
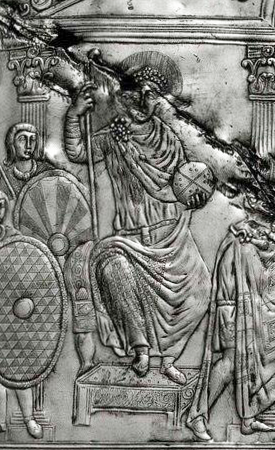
Valentinian II on the Missorium of Theodosius I; AD 388

On 15 May 392, Valentinian was found hanged in his residence in Vienne. Arbogast maintained that the emperor's death was suicide. Many sources believe, however, that the general had him murdered; ancient historians were divided in their opinion. Some modern scholars lean toward suicide. McEvoy, Williams and Friell asserted that Arbogast had little reason to change his situation, while McLynn observed how no one benefitted from the emperor's death. Ambrose's eulogy is the only contemporary Western source for Valentinian's death. It is ambiguous on the question of the emperor's death, which is not surprising, as Ambrose represents him as a model of Christian virtue. Suicide, not murder, would make the bishop dissemble on this key question.

The young man's body was conveyed in ceremony to Milan for burial by Ambrose, mourned by his sisters Justa and Grata. He was laid in a porphyry sarcophagus next to his brother Gratian, most probably in the Chapel of Sant'Aquilino attached to San Lorenzo. (Note: The bottom of the sarcophagus may be identical to a porphyry tub (labrum) now in the Duomo of Milan.) He was deified with the consecratio: Divae Memoriae Valentinianus, lit. 'Valentinian of Divine Memory'.

At first Arbogast recognized Theodosius's son Arcadius as emperor in the West, seemingly surprised by his charge's death. After three months, during which he had no communication from Theodosius, Arbogast selected an imperial official, Eugenius, as emperor. Theodosius initially tolerated this regime but, in January 393, elevated the eight-year-old Honorius as augustus to succeed Valentinian II. Civil war ensued and, in 394, Theodosius defeated Eugenius and Arbogast at the Battle of the Frigidus.

== Significance ==
Constantine I and his sons re-established the practice of hereditary succession, a system that Valentinian I continued to maintain. However, from the Crisis of the Third Century the empire had been ruled by campaigning emperors. This trend came to a break with the reign of Valentinian II, a child. Valentinian seems to have lacked authority as a figurehead for various interests: his mother, his co-emperors, and powerful generals. His reign was a harbinger of the fifth century, when young emperors were controlled by powerful generals and officials until mid-century (Honorius, Arcadius, Theodosius II, Valentinian III and Romulus Augustulus).

== Bibliography ==
- Croke, Brian (1976). "Arbogast and the Death of Valentinian II". Historia: Zeitschrift für Alte Geschichte. 25 (2): 235–244. JSTOR 4435500.
- Curran, J (1998). "From Jovian to Theodosius". The Cambridge Ancient History. Vol. XIII: The Late Empire AD 337–425. Cambridge: University Press.
- Errington, R.M. (1996). "The Accession of Theodosius I". Klio. 78 (2): 438–453. doi:10.1524/klio.1996.78.2.438. S2CID 193468287.
- Hebblewhite, Mark (2020). Theodosius and the Limits of Empire. London: Routledge. doi:10.4324/9781315103334. ISBN 978-1-138-10298-9. S2CID 213344890.
- Johnson, Mark J. (1991). "On the Burial Places of the Valentinian Dynasty". Historia: Zeitschrift für Alte Geschichte. 40 (4): 501–506. JSTOR 4436217.
- McEvoy, Meaghan (2013). Child Emperor Rule in the Late Roman West, AD 367–455. Oxford University Press. ISBN 978-0199664818.
- Williams, S; Friell, G (1994). Theodosius: the Empire at Bay. Routledge. ISBN 9780713466911.
- McLynn, Neil B. (1994). Ambrose of Milan: Church and Court in a Christian Capital. The Transformation of the Classical Heritage. Vol. 22. Berkeley: University of California Press. ISBN 978-0-520-08461-2.
- Lenski, Noel (2003). Failure of Empire: Valens and the Roman State in the Fourth Century A.D. Berkeley: University of California Press. ISBN 0-520-23332-8.

Valentinian II Valentinianic dynasty Born: 371 Died: 15 May 392
Regnal titles
Preceded by Valentinian I	Roman emperor 371–392; With: Valens, Gratian and Theodosius I	Succeeded by Theodosius I
Political offices
Preceded by Gratian; Equitius	Roman consul 376 with Valens	Succeeded by Gratian; Merobaudes
Preceded by Gratian; Merobaudes	Roman consul 378 with Valens	Succeeded by Ausonius; Q. Clodius Hermogenianus Olybrius
Preceded by Honorius; Euodius	Roman consul 387 with Eutropius	Succeeded by Magnus Maximus, Theodosius I, Maternus Cynegius
Preceded by Timasius; Promotus	Roman consul 390 with Neoterius	Succeeded by Eutolmius Tatianus; Q. Aurelius Symmachus
