= Theodosius I =

Roman emperor from 379 to 395

Theodosius the Great
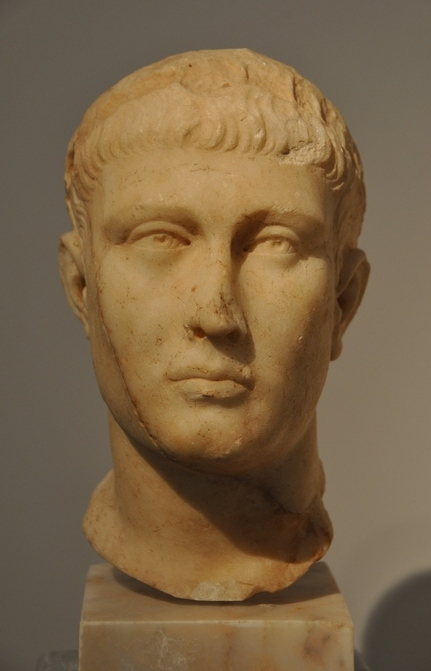
- Bust of an emperor found in Aphrodisias (Aydın, Turkey), most likely Theodosius I (Note: The head was found near a headless statue and a columnar base honoring "Flavius Claudius Theodosius" (originally Julian). The portrait is incompatible with busts identified as Theodosius II, which have more youthful attributes.)

Roman emperor
- Augustus: 19 January 379 – 17 January 395 (Note: Initially emperor of the Eastern Roman Empire; sole Roman emperor from 6 September 394.)
- Predecessor: Valens
- Successors: Arcadius (East); Honorius (West)
- Co-rulers: See list: Gratian (379–383); Valentinian II (379–392); Arcadius (383–395); Magnus Maximus (383–388); Victor (384–388); Eugenius (392–394); Honorius (393–395)
- Born: 11 January 347; Cauca or Italica, in Hispania (present-day Spain)
- Died: 17 January 395 (aged 48); Mediolanum, Roman Empire
- Burial: Church of the Holy Apostles, Constantinople, Roman Empire
- Spouse: Aelia Flaccilla (m. 376, died 386) Galla (m. 387, died 394)
- Issue: Arcadius; Pulcheria; Honorius; Gratian; Galla Placidia; John
Regnal name
- Imperator Caesar Flavius Theodosius Augustus (Note: The name "Flavius" had become a status marker for men of non-senatorial background who rose to eminence as a result of imperial service.)
- Dynasty: Theodosian
- Father: Theodosius the Elder
- Mother: Thermantia
- Religion: Nicene Christianity

Theodosius I (Latin: Theodosius, Ancient Greek: Θεοδόσιος Theodósios; 11 January 347 – 17 January 395), also known as Theodosius the Great, was Roman emperor from 379 to 395. He won two civil wars and was instrumental in establishing the Nicene Creed as the orthodox doctrine for Nicene Christianity. Theodosius was the last emperor to rule the entire Roman Empire. After his death, his sons Arcadius and Honorius ruled from separate courts in the east and the west, continuing the late Roman practice of rule by multiple emperors. He ended the Gothic War (376–382), but did so on terms disadvantageous to the empire, with the Goths remaining politically autonomous within Roman territory, albeit as nominal allies.

Born in Hispania, Theodosius was the son of a high-ranking general of the same name, Theodosius the Elder, under whose guidance he rose through the ranks of the Roman army. Theodosius held independent command in Moesia in 374, where he had some success against the invading Sarmatians. Not long afterwards, he was forced into retirement, and his father was executed under obscure circumstances. Theodosius soon regained his position following a series of intrigues and executions at Emperor Gratian's court. In 379, after the eastern Roman emperor Valens was killed at the Battle of Adrianople against the Goths, Gratian appointed Theodosius as a successor with orders to take charge of the military emergency. The new emperor's resources and depleted armies were not sufficient to drive the invaders out; in 382 the Goths were allowed to settle south of the Danube as autonomous allies of the empire. In 386, Theodosius signed a treaty with the Sasanian Empire which partitioned the long-disputed Kingdom of Armenia and secured a durable peace between the two powers.

Theodosius was a strong adherent of the Christian doctrine of consubstantiality and an opponent of Arianism. He convened a council of bishops at the First Council of Constantinople in 381, which confirmed the former as orthodoxy and the latter as a heresy. Although Theodosius interfered little in the functioning of traditional pagan cults and appointed non-Christians to high offices, he did not prevent or punish Christians for the demolition of several pagan temples of classical antiquity such as the Serapeum of Alexandria.

During the earlier part of his reign, Theodosius ruled the eastern provinces, while the west was overseen by the emperor Gratian (nominally co-ruling with his young brother Valentinian II). In 386 an arranged marriage with Valentinian's sister Galla served to consolidate Theodosius's political and military power. Theodosius sponsored several measures to improve Constantinople, his capital and main place of residence—notably his expansion of the Forum Tauri, which became the biggest public square known in antiquity. Theodosius invaded the western empire twice, in 388 against the usurper Magnus Maximus, who had killed Gratian, and in 394 against Eugenius, who had been named emperor after Valentinian died in suspicious circumstances. Theodosius's final military victory in September 394 made him ruler of the entire empire, but he died a few months later. His two young sons, previously made his co-emperors, jointly succeeded him: Arcadius in the eastern half of the empire and Honorius in the west.

Theodosius was said to have been a diligent administrator, austere in his habits, merciful, and a devout Christian. In the centuries after his death, Theodosius was regarded as a champion of Christian orthodoxy who decisively stamped out paganism; however, modern scholars tend to see this as an interpretation of history by Christian writers more than as an accurate representation of actual history. He is fairly credited with presiding over a revival in classical art that some historians have termed a "Theodosian renaissance". Although his pacification of the Goths secured peace for the Empire during his lifetime, their status as an autonomous entity within Roman borders caused problems for succeeding emperors. Theodosius has also received criticism for defending his own dynastic interests at the cost of two civil wars. His two sons proved weak and incapable rulers, and they presided over a period marked by foreign invasions and court intrigues, seriously weakening the empire(s). However, the descendants of Theodosius did rule the Roman world for the next six decades, and the east–west division endured until the fall of the Western Roman Empire in the late 5th century.

== Background ==
Theodosius was born in Hispania (Note: According to Hydatius and Zosimus, he was born at "Cauca in Gallaecia", while Marcellinus Comes and Jordanes place his birth at Italica in Hispania Baetica, the same place as the emperor Trajan. Authors have tended to reject Italica, arguing that this probably arose due to a confusion or fabrication resulting from the fact that Theodosius was widely associated with the image of Trajan. After reviewing the sources, Gorbea favors Cauca over Italica. However, he acknowledges that modern critics are divided on the issue. Hebblewhite accepted that Theodosius was born at Cauca in Gallaecia without stating any reason for rejecting Italica.) on 11 January, probably in the year 347. His father of the same name, Theodosius the Elder was a successful and high-ranking general (magister equitum) under the western Roman emperor Valentinian I, and his mother was called Thermantia. The family appear to have been minor landed aristocrats in Hispania, although it is not clear if this social status went back several generations or if Theodosius the Elder was simply awarded land there for his military service. Their roots to Hispania were nevertheless probably long-standing, since various relatives of the future emperor Theodosius are likewise attested as being from there, and Theodosius himself was ubiquitously associated in the ancient literary sources and panegyrics with the image of fellow Spanish-born emperor Trajan. Theodosius, however, never again visited the Iberian peninsula after becoming emperor.

Very little is recorded of the upbringing of Theodosius. The 5th-century author Theodoret claimed the future emperor grew up and was educated in his Iberian homeland, but his testimony is unreliable. One modern historian instead thinks Theodosius must have grown up among the army, participating in his father's campaigns throughout the provinces, as was customary at the time for families with a tradition of military service. One source says he received a decent education and developed a particular interest in history, which Theodosius then valued as a guide to his own conduct throughout life.

== Career ==
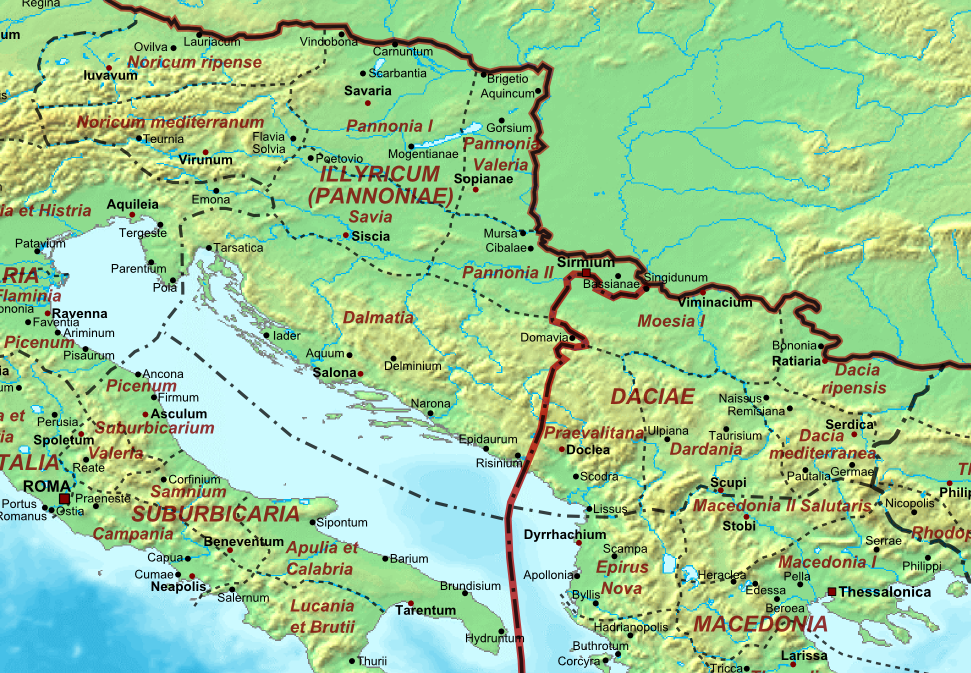
Theodosius was commander of the army in Moesia I in 374. His dismissal may have been connected to the accession of the emperor Valentinian II, which took place at Aquincum (Budapest) in nearby Pannonia Valeria, in 375.

Theodosius is first attested accompanying his father to Britain on his expedition in 368–369 to suppress the "Great Conspiracy", a concerted Celtic and Germanic invasion of the island provinces. After probably serving in his father's staff on further campaigns, Theodosius received his first independent command by 374 when he was appointed the dux (commanding officer) of the province of Moesia Prima in the Danube. In the autumn of 374, he successfully repulsed an incursion of Sarmatians on his sector of the frontier and forced them into submission. Not long afterwards, however, under mysterious circumstances, Theodosius's father suddenly fell from imperial favor and was executed; it was at this time too that the future emperor felt compelled to retire to his estates in Hispania.

Although these events are poorly documented, historians usually attribute this fall from grace to the machinations of a court faction led by Maximinus, a senior civilian official. According to another theory, the future emperor Theodosius lost his father, or his military post, or both, in the purges of high officials that resulted from the accession of the 4-year-old emperor Valentinian II in November 375. Theodosius's period away from service in Hispania, during which he was said to have received threats from those responsible for his father's death, did not last long, however, as Maximinus, the probable culprit, was himself removed from power around April 376 and then executed. The emperor Gratian immediately began replacing Maximinus and his associates with relatives of Theodosius in key government positions, indicating the family's full rehabilitation, and by 377 Theodosius himself had regained his command against the Sarmatians. (Note: Whether or not Maximinus was the actual culprit, Theodosius seems to have believed so, since he never sought out his father's enemies after becoming emperor. Maximinus is the only person to be explicitly blamed in any ancient source. Although most historians believe that the order was issued in name of the 16-year-old emperor Gratian, some consider the possibility that the command instead came from Gratian's father, Valentinian I. Hebblewhite blames not Maximinus but Merobaudes, the officer responsible for the unauthorized elevation of Valentinian II in 375, for the execution of Theodosius senior, and implies that Maximinus and his clique at court were scapegoated.)

Theodosius's renewed term of office seems to have gone uneventfully, until news arrived that the eastern Roman emperor, Valens, had been killed at the Battle of Adrianople in August 378 against invading Goths. The disastrous defeat left much of Rome's military leadership dead, discredited, or barbarian in origin, with the result that Theodosius, notwithstanding his own modest record, became the establishment's choice to replace Valens and assume control of the crisis. With the begrudging consent of the western emperor Gratian, Theodosius was formally invested with the purple by a council of officials at Sirmium on 19 January 379.

== Reign ==
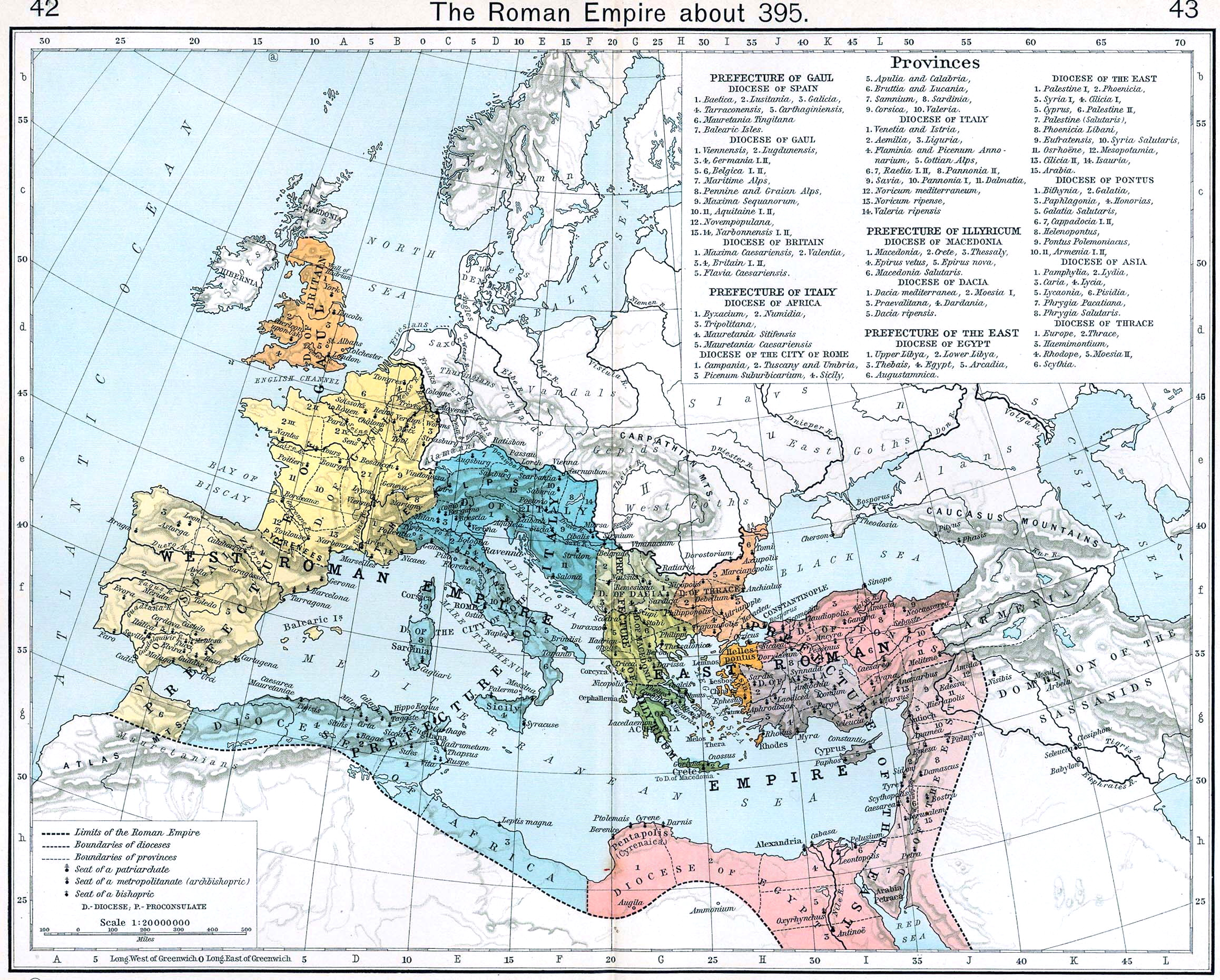
The administrative divisions of the Roman Empire in 395, under Theodosius I.

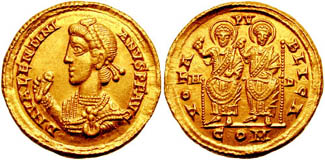
Solidus of Valentinian II showing Valentinian II and Theodosius I on the reverse, each holding a mappa

=== Gothic War (376–382) ===
The immediate problem facing Theodosius upon his accession was how to check the bands of Goths that were laying waste to the Balkans, with an army that had been severely depleted of manpower following the debacle at Adrianople. The western emperor Gratian, who seems to have provided only little immediate assistance, surrendered to Theodosius control of the praetorian prefecture of Illyricum for the duration of the conflict, giving his new colleague full charge of the war effort. Theodosius implemented stern and desperate recruiting measures, resorting to the conscription of farmers and miners. Punishments were instituted for harboring deserters and furnishing unfit recruits, and even self-mutilation did not exempt men from service. Theodosius also admitted large numbers of non-Roman auxiliaries into the army, even Gothic deserters from beyond the Danube. Some of these foreign recruits were exchanged with more reliable Roman garrison troops stationed in Egypt.

In the second half of 379, Theodosius and his generals, based at Thessalonica, won some minor victories over individual bands of raiders. However, they suffered at least one serious defeat in 380, which was blamed on the treachery of the new barbarian recruits. During the autumn of 380, a life-threatening illness, from which Theodosius recovered, prompted him to request baptism. Some obscure victories were recorded in official sources around this time, however, and, in November 380, the military situation was found to be sufficiently stable for Theodosius to move his court to Constantinople. There, the emperor enjoyed a propaganda victory when, in January 381, he received the visit and submission of a minor Gothic leader, Athanaric. By this point, however, Theodosius seems to have no longer believed that the Goths could be completely ejected from Roman territory. After Athanaric died that very same month, the emperor gave him a funeral with full honors, impressing his entourage and signaling to the enemy that the Empire was disposed to negotiate terms. During the campaigning season of 381, reinforcements from Gratian drove the Goths out of the Diocese of Macedonia and Thessaly into the Diocese of Thrace, while, in the latter sector, Theodosius or one of his generals repulsed an incursion by a group of Sciri and Huns across the Danube.

Following negotiations which likely lasted at least several months, the Romans and Goths finally concluded a treaty on 3 October 382. In return for military service to Rome, the Goths were allowed to settle some tracts of Roman land south of the Danube. The terms were unusually favorable to the Goths, reflecting the fact that they were entrenched in Roman territory and had not been driven out. Namely, instead of fully submitting to Roman authority, they were allowed to remain autonomous under their own leaders, and thus could remain a strong, unified community or force. The Goths now settled within the Empire would fight for the Romans, but largely as a national contingent, as opposed to being fully integrated into the Roman forces.

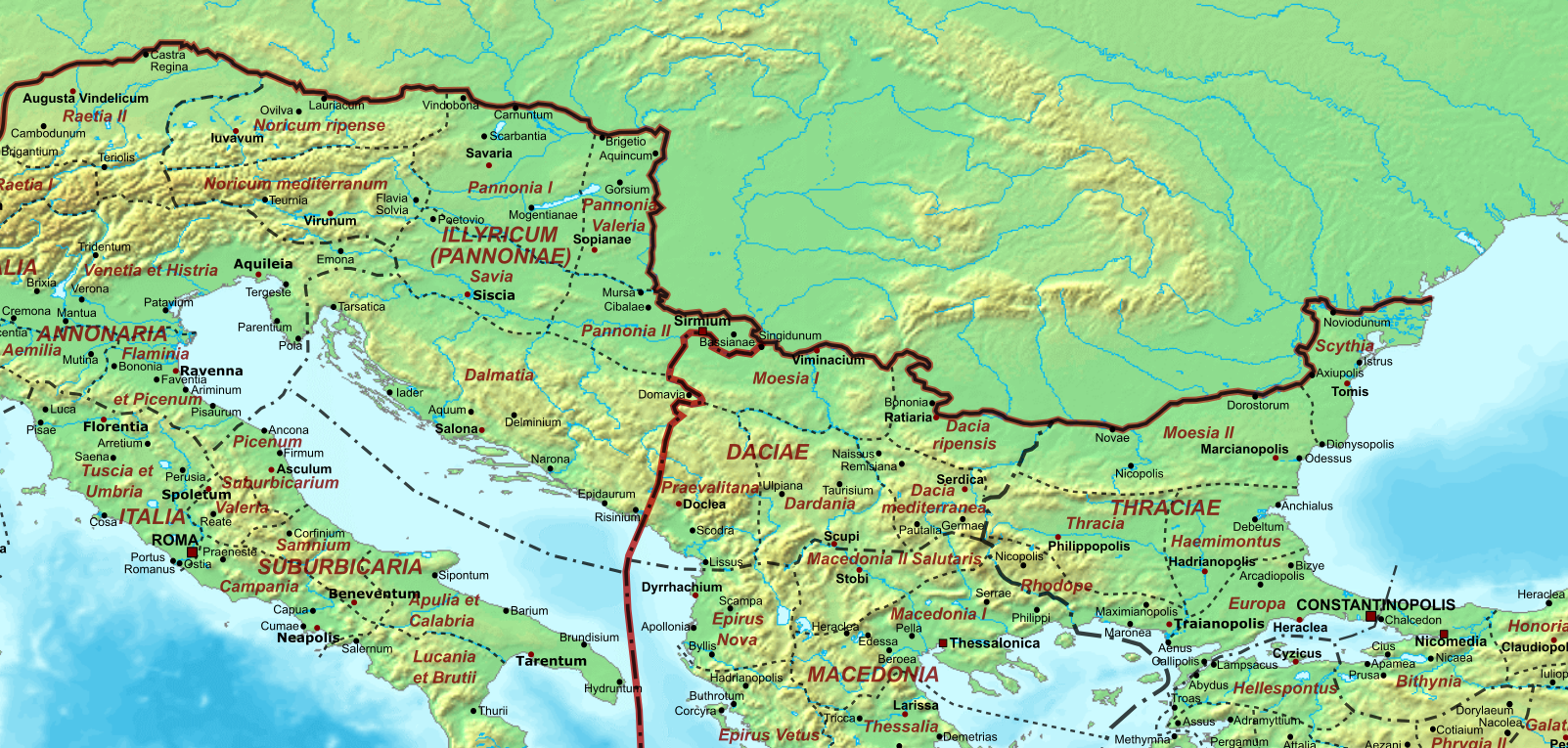
Roman provinces along the Ister (Danube), showing the Roman dioceses of Thrace, Dacia, Pannonia and Italia Annonaria on the empire's northern frontier

=== 383–384 ===
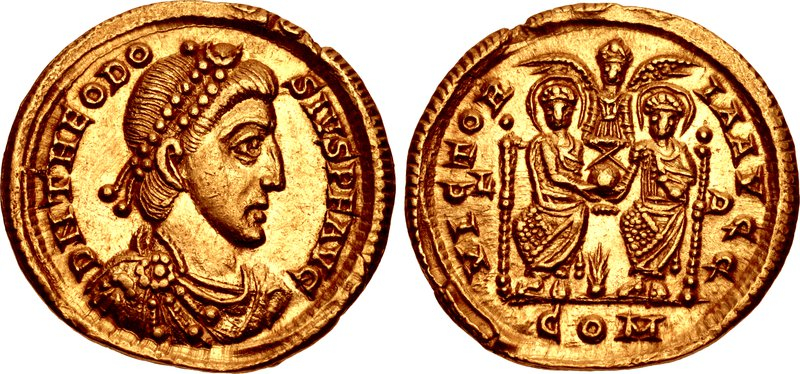
Solidus of Theodosius, showing both him and his co-emperor Valentinian II (r. 375–392) enthroned on the reverse, each crowned by Victory and together holding an orb victoria augg ("the Victory of the Augusti")

According to the Chronicon Paschale, Theodosius celebrated his quinquennalia on 19 January 383 at Constantinople; on this occasion he raised his eldest son Arcadius to co-emperor (augustus). Sometime in 383, Gratian's wife Constantia died. Gratian remarried, wedding Laeta, whose father was a consularis of Roman Syria. Early 383 saw the acclamation of Magnus Maximus as emperor in Britain and the appointment of Themistius as praefectus urbi in Constantinople. On 25 August 383, according to the Consularia Constantinopolitana, Gratian was killed at Lugdunum (Lyon) by Andragathius, the magister equitum of the rebel emperor during the rebellion of Magnus Maximus. Constantia's body arrived in Constantinople on 12 September that year and was buried in the Church of the Holy Apostles on 1 December. Gratian was deified as Latin: Divus Gratianus, lit. 'the Divine Gratian'.

Theodosius, unable to do much about Maximus due to ongoing military inadequacy, opened negotiations with the Persian emperor Shapur III (r. 383–388) of the Sasanian Empire. According to the Consularia Constantinopolitana, Theodosius received in Constantinople an embassy from them in 384.

In an attempt to curb Maximus's ambitions, Theodosius appointed Flavius Neoterius as the Praetorian Prefect of Italy. In the summer of 384, Theodosius met his co-emperor Valentinian II in northern Italy. Theodosius brokered a peace agreement between Valentinian and Magnus Maximus which endured for several years.

Theodosius I was based in Constantinople, and according to Peter Heather, wanted, "for his own dynastic reasons (for his two sons each eventually to inherit half of the empire), refused to appoint a recognized counterpart in the west. As a result he was faced with rumbling discontent there, as well as dangerous usurpers, who found plentiful support among the bureaucrats and military officers who felt they were not getting a fair share of the imperial cake."

=== Middle reign: 384–387 ===
Theodosius's second son Honorius was born on 9 December 384 and titled nobilissimus puer (or nobilissimus iuvenis). The death of Aelia Flaccilla, Theodosius's first wife and the mother of Arcadius, Honorius, and Pulcheria, occurred by 386. She died at Scotumis in Thrace and was buried at Constantinople, her funeral oration delivered by Gregory of Nyssa. A statue of her was dedicated in the Byzantine Senate. In 384 or 385, Theodosius's niece Serena was married to the magister militum, Stilicho.

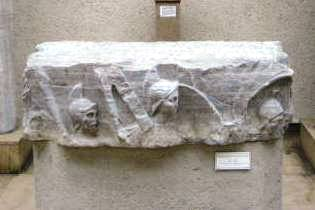
Marble fragment of monumental column to emperor Theodosius I

In the beginning of 386, Theodosius's daughter Pulcheria also died. Her funeral oration was also delivered by Gregory of Nyssa. That summer, more Goths were defeated, and many were settled in Phrygia. According to the Consularia Constantinopolitana, a Roman triumph over the Gothic Greuthungi was then celebrated at Constantinople. The same year, work began on the great triumphal column in the Forum of Theodosius in Constantinople, the Column of Theodosius. The Consularia Constantinopolitana records that on 19 January 387, Arcadius celebrated his quinquennalia in Constantinople. By the end of the month, there was an uprising or riot in Antioch (modern Antakya). The Roman–Persian Wars concluded with the signing of the Peace of Acilisene with Persia. By the terms of the agreement, the ancient Kingdom of Armenia was divided between the powers.

By the end of the 380s, Theodosius and the court were in Milan and northern Italy had settled down to a period of prosperity. Peter Brown says gold was being made in Milan by those who owned land as well as by those who came with the court for government service. Great landowners took advantage of the court's need for food, "turning agrarian produce into gold", while repressing and misusing the poor who grew it and brought it in. According to Brown, modern scholars link the decline of the Roman empire to the avarice of the rich of this era. He quotes Paulinus of Milan as describing these men as creating a court where "everything was up for sale". In the late 380s, Ambrose, the bishop of Milan took the lead in opposing this, presenting the need for the rich to care for the poor as "a necessary consequence of the unity of all Christians". This led to a major development in the political culture of the day called the “advocacy revolution of the later Roman empire". This revolution had been fostered by the imperial government, and it encouraged appeals and denunciations of bad government from below. However, Brown adds that, "in the crucial area of taxation and the treatment of fiscal debtors, the late Roman state [of the 380s and 390s] remained impervious to Christianity".

=== Civil war: 387–388 ===
The peace with Magnus Maximus was broken in 387, and Valentinian escaped to the east with Justina, reaching Thessalonica (Thessaloniki) in summer or autumn 387 and appealing to Theodosius for aid; Valentinian II's sister Galla was then married to the eastern emperor at Thessalonica in late autumn. Theodosius may still have been in Thessalonica when he celebrated his decennalia (the ten year anniversary of his coming to power) on 19 January 388. Theodosius was consul for the second time in 388. Galla and Theodosius's first child, a son named Gratian, was born in 388 or 389. In summer 388, Theodosius recovered Italy from Magnus Maximus for Valentinian, and in June, the meeting of Christians deemed heretics was banned by Valentinian.

The armies of Theodosius and Maximus fought at the Battle of Poetovio in 388, which saw Maximus defeated. On 28 August 388 Maximus was executed. Now the de facto ruler of the Western empire as well, Theodosius celebrated his victory in Rome on 13 June 389 and stayed in Milan until 391, installing his own loyalists in senior positions including the new magister militum of the West, the Frankish general Arbogast. According to the Consularia Constantinopolitana, Arbogast killed Flavius Victor (r. 384–388), Magnus Maximus's young son and co-emperor, in Gaul in August/September that year. Damnatio memoriae was pronounced against them, and inscriptions naming them were erased.

=== Massacre and its aftermath: 388–391 ===
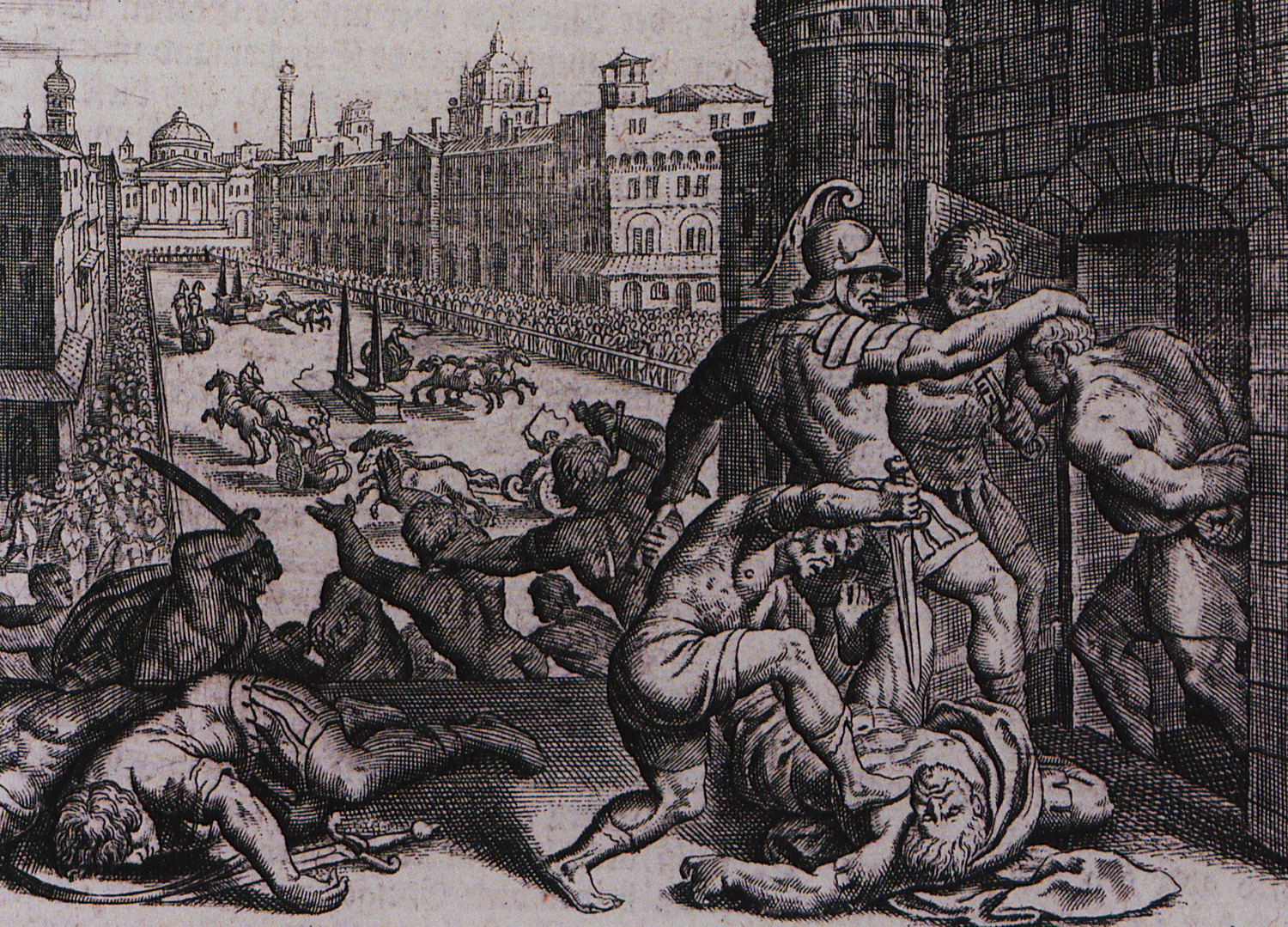
Massacre in the Hippodrome of Thessaloniki in 390, 16th-century wood engraving

The Massacre of Thessalonica (Thessaloniki) in Greece was a massacre of local civilians by Roman troops. The best estimate of the date is April of 390. The massacre was most likely a response to an urban riot that led to the murder of a Roman official. What most scholars, such as philosopher Stanislav Doležal, see as the most reliable of the sources is the Historia ecclesiastica written by Sozomen about 442; in it Sozomen supplies the identity of the murdered Roman official as Butheric, the commanding general of the field army in Illyricum (magister militum per Illyricum). According to Sozomen, a popular charioteer tried to rape a cup-bearer (or possibly Butheric himself), and in response, Butheric arrested and jailed the charioteer. The populace demanded the chariot racer's release, and when Butheric refused, a general revolt rose up costing Butheric his life. Doležal says the name "Butheric" indicates he might have been a Goth, and that the general's ethnicity "could have been" a factor in the riot, but none of the early sources actually say so.

==== Sources ====
There are no contemporaneous accounts. Church historians Sozomen, Theodoret the bishop of Cyrrhus, Socrates of Constantinople and Rufinus wrote the earliest accounts during the fifth century. These are moral accounts emphasizing imperial piety and ecclesial action rather than historical and political details. Further difficulty is created by these events moving into legend in art and literature almost immediately. Doležal explains that yet another problem is created by aspects of these accounts contradicting one another to the point of being mutually exclusive. Nonetheless, most classicists accept at least the basic account of the massacre, although they continue to dispute when it happened, who was responsible for it, what motivated it, and what impact it had on subsequent events.

==== Theodosius's role ====
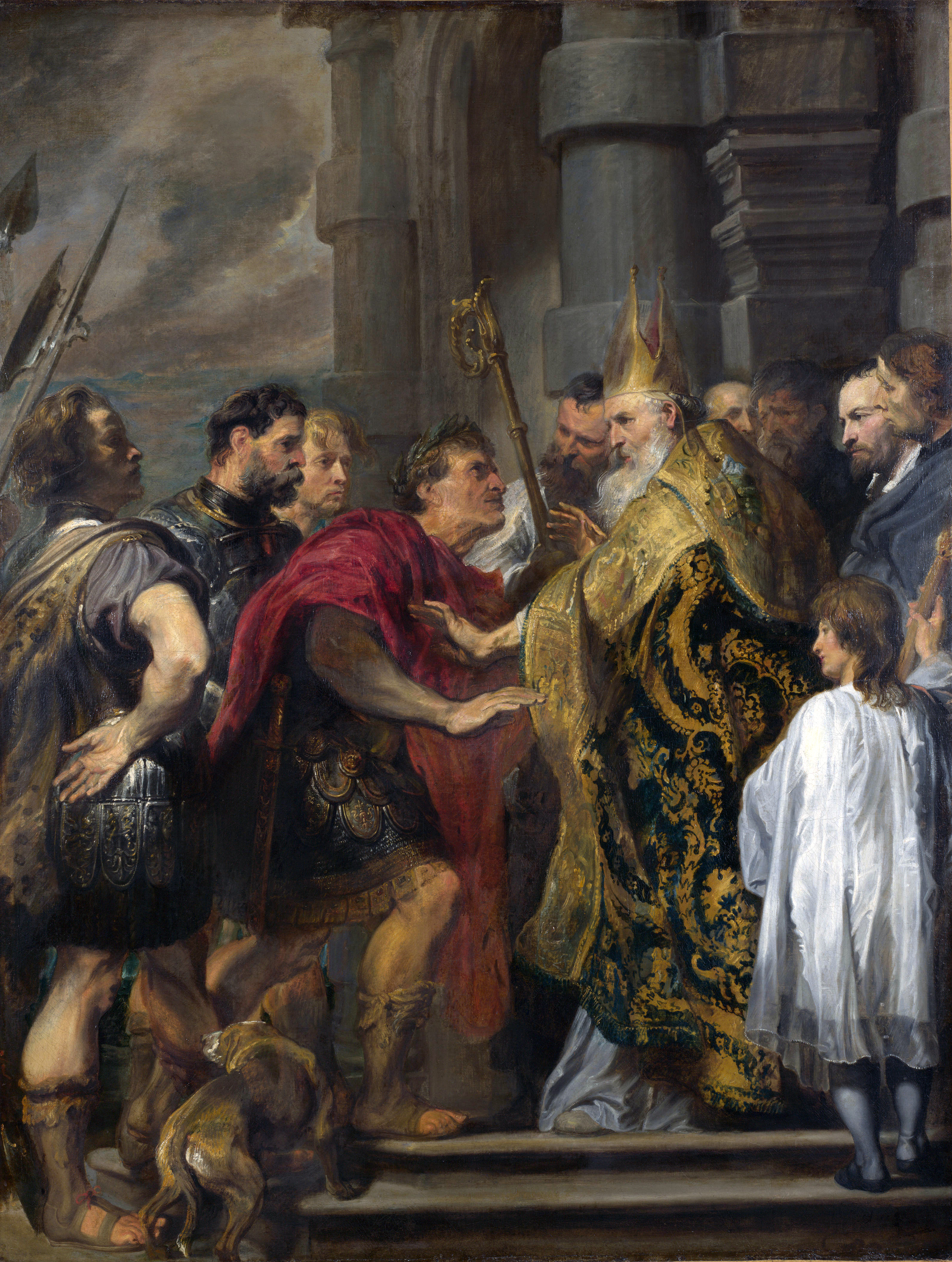
Anthonis Van Dyke's 1619 painting of St. Ambrose blocking the cathedral door, refusing Theodosius's admittance (National Gallery).

Theodosius was not in Thessalonica when the massacre occurred. The court was in Milan. Several scholars, such as historian G. W. Bowersock and authors Stephen Williams and Gerard Friell, think that Theodosius ordered the massacre in an excess of "volcanic anger". McLynn also puts all the blame on the Emperor as does the less dependable fifth century historian, Theodoret. Other scholars, such as historians Mark Hebblewhite and N. Q. King, do not agree. Peter Brown points to the empire's established process of decision making, which required the emperor "to listen to his ministers" before acting. There is some indication in the sources that Theodosius did listen to his counselors but received bad or misleading advice.

J. F. Matthews argues that the Emperor first tried to punish the city by selective executions. Peter Brown concurs: "As it was, what was probably planned as a selective killing ... got out of hand". Doleźal says Sozomen is very specific in writing that in response to the riot, the soldiers made random arrests in the hippodrome to perform a few public executions as a demonstration of imperial disfavor, but the citizenry objected. "The soldiers, realizing that they were surrounded by angry citizens, perhaps panicked ... and ... forcibly cleared the hippodrome at the cost of several thousands of lives of local inhabitants". McLynn says Theodosius was “unable to impose discipline upon the faraway troops" and covered that failure by taking responsibility for the massacre, declaring that he had given the order, and then countermanded it too late to stop it.

Ambrose, the bishop of Milan and one of Theodosius's many counselors, was away from court at the time. After being informed of events concerning Thessalonica, he wrote Theodosius a letter offering what McLynn calls "a different way for the emperor to save face" and restore his public image. Ambrose urged a semi-public demonstration of penitence, telling the emperor he would not give Theodosius communion until it was done. Wolf Liebeschuetz notes that "Theodosius duly complied and came to church without his imperial robes, until Christmas, when Ambrose openly admitted him to communion".

Washburn says the image of the mitered prelate braced in the door of the cathedral in Milan blocking Theodosius from entering is a product of the imagination of Theodoret who wrote of the events of 390 "using his own ideology to fill the gaps in the historical record". Peter Brown also says there was no dramatic encounter at the church door. McLynn states that "the encounter at the church door has long been known as a pious fiction". Wolf Liebeschuetz says Ambrose advocated a course of action which avoided the kind of public humiliation Theodoret describes, and that is the course Theodosius chose.

==== Aftermath and historical assessment ====
It is only modern scholarship that has begun to question Theodosius' guilt for the massacre. According to the early twentieth-century historian Henry Smith Williams, history's assessment of Theodosius's character has been stained for centuries by the massacre of Thessalonica. Williams describes Theodosius as a virtuous-minded, courageous man, who was vigorous in pursuit of any important goal, but by contrasting the "inhuman massacre of the people of Thessalonica" with "the generous pardon of the citizens of Antioch" after revolting during a civil war, Williams nevertheless concludes that Theodosius was also "hasty and choleric".

From the time Edward Gibbon wrote his Rise and Fall of the Roman Empire, Ambrose's action after the fact has been cited as an example of the church's dominance over the state in Antiquity. Alan Cameron says "the assumption is so widespread it would be superfluous to cite authorities. But there is not a shred of evidence for Ambrose exerting any such influence over Theodosius". Brown says Ambrose was just one among many advisors, and Cameron says there is no evidence Theodosius favored him above anyone else.

By the time of the Thessalonian affair, Ambrose, an aristocrat and former governor, had been a bishop for 16 years, and during his episcopate, had seen the death of three emperors before Theodosius. These produced significant political storms, yet Ambrose held his place using what McLynn calls his "considerable qualities [and] considerable luck" to survive. Theodosius was in his 40s, had been emperor for 11 years, had temporarily settled the Gothic wars, and won a civil war. As a Latin speaking Nicene western leader of the Greek largely Arian East, Boniface Ramsey says he had already left an indelible mark on history.

McLynn asserts that the relationship between Theodosius and Ambrose transformed into myth within a generation of their deaths. He also observes that the documents revealing the relationship between these two formidable men do not show the personal friendship the legends portray. Instead, those documents read more as negotiations between the institutions the men represent: the Roman state and the Italian Church.

=== Second civil war: 392–394 ===
In 391, Theodosius left his trusted general Arbogast, who had served in the Balkans after Adrianople, to be magister militum for the Western emperor Valentinian II, while Theodosius attempted to rule the entire empire from Constantinople. On 15 May 392, Valentinian II died at Vienna in Gaul (Vienne), either by suicide or as part of a plot by Arbogast. Valentinian had quarrelled publicly with Arbogast, and was found hanged in his room. Arbogast announced that this had been a suicide. Stephen Williams asserts that Valentinian's death left Arbogast in "an untenable position". He had to carry on governing without the ability to issue edicts and rescripts from a legitimate acclaimed emperor. Arbogast was unable to assume the role of emperor himself because of his non-Roman background. Instead, on 22 August 392, Arbogast had Valentinian's master of correspondence, Eugenius, proclaimed emperor in the West at Lugdunum.

At least two embassies went to Theodosius to explain events, one of them Christian in make-up, but they received ambivalent replies, and were sent home without achieving their goals. Theodosius raised his second son Honorius to emperor on 23 January 393, implying the illegality of Eugenius's rule. Williams and Friell say that by the spring of 393, the split was complete, and "in April Arbogast and Eugenius at last moved into Italy without resistance". Flavianus, the praetorian prefect of Italy whom Theodosius had appointed, defected to their side. Through early 394, both sides prepared for war.

Theodosius gathered a large army, including the Goths whom he had settled in the eastern empire as foederati, and Caucasian and Saracen auxiliaries, and marched against Eugenius. The battle began on 5 September 394, with Theodosius's full frontal assault on Eugenius's forces. Thousands of Goths died, and in Theodosius's camp, the loss of the day decreased morale. It is said by Theodoret that Theodosius was visited by two "heavenly riders all in white" who gave him courage.

The next day, the extremely bloody battle began again and Theodosius's forces were aided by a natural phenomenon known as the Bora, which can produce hurricane-strength winds. The Bora blew directly against the forces of Eugenius and disrupted the line. Eugenius's camp was stormed; Eugenius was captured and soon after executed. According to Socrates Scholasticus, Theodosius defeated Eugenius at the Battle of the Frigidus (the Vipava) on 6 September 394. On 8 September, Arbogast killed himself. According to Socrates, on 1 January 395, Honorius arrived in Mediolanum and a victory celebration was held there. Zosimus records that, at the end of April 394, Theodosius's wife Galla had died while he was away at war.

A number of Christian sources report that Eugenius cultivated the support of the pagan senators by promising to restore the altar of Victory and provide public funds for the maintenance of cults if they would support him and if he won the coming war against Theodosius. Cameron notes that the ultimate source for this is Ambrose's biographer Paulinus the Deacon, whom he argues fabricated the entire narrative and deserves no credence. Historian Michele Renee Salzman explains that "two newly relevant texts – John Chrysostom's Homily 6, adversus Catharos (PG 63: 491–492) and the Consultationes Zacchei et Apollonii, re-dated to the 390s, reinforces the view that religion was not the key ideological element in the events at the time". According to Maijastina Kahlos, Finnish historian and Docent of Latin language and Roman literature at the University of Helsinki, the notion of pagan aristocrats united in a "heroic and cultured resistance" who rose up against the ruthless advance of Christianity in a final battle near Frigidus in 394 is a romantic myth.

== Religious policy ==
=== Arianism and orthodoxy ===
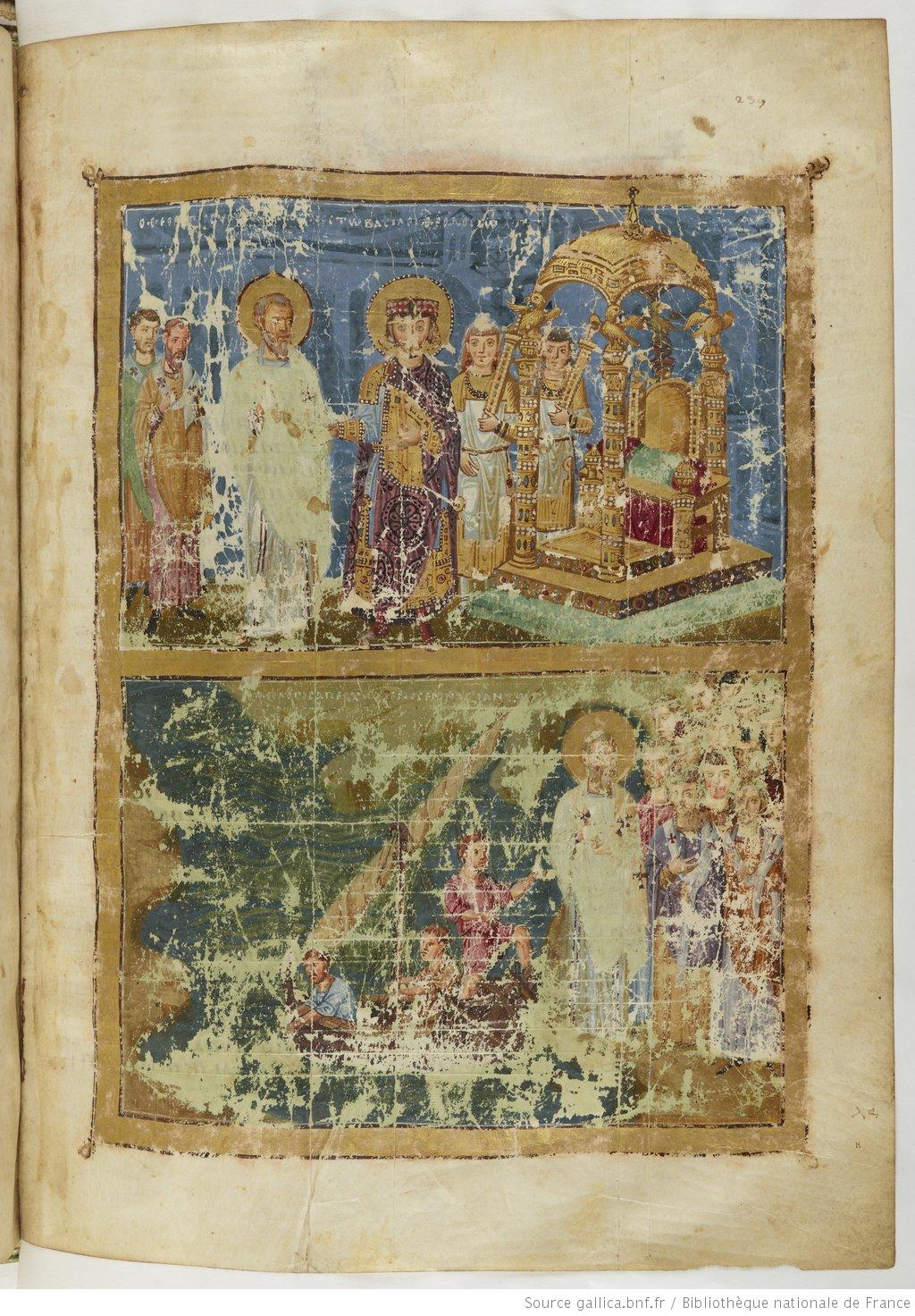
Theodosius appointing Gregory of Nazianzus as Patriarch in 380. Scene from the 9th-century Paris Gregory.

It is traditionally stated that the Arian Controversy, a dispute concerning the nature of the divine trinity, and its accompanying struggles for political influence, started in Alexandria during the reign of Constantine the Great between a presbyter, Arius of Alexandria, and his bishop, Alexander of Alexandria. However, “many of the issues raised by the controversy were under lively discussion before Arius and Alexander publicly clashed.” “The views of Arius were such as … to bring into unavoidable prominence a doctrinal crisis which had gradually been gathering. … He was the spark that started the explosion. But in himself he was of no great significance.”

It is also traditionally stated that Alexander represented orthodoxy and that, when he died, his successor, Athanasius, became the representative of orthodoxy. In reality, “Nicene apologists … turn ‘Arianism' into a self-conscious sect – as if the boundaries of Catholic identity were firmly and clearly drawn in advance. But the whole history of Arius and of Arianism reminds us that this was not so.” (RW, 83) The Arian Controversy "is not the story of a defence of orthodoxy, but of a search for orthodoxy."

Arius asserted that God the Father created the Son. This meant the Son, though still seen as divine, was not equal to the Father, because he had a beginning, and was not eternal. "The controversy had spread from Alexandria into almost all the African regions and was considered a disturbance of the public order by the Roman Empire." (Eusebius of Caesarea in The Life of Constantine)

Constantine had tried to settle the issues at the Council of Nicaea, but as Arnold Hugh Martin Jones states: "The rules laid down at Nicaea were not universally accepted". After the Nicene Creed was formulated in 325, many in the church reacted strongly against the word "homoousios" in the Creed, and therefore Councils at Ariminum (Rimini), Nike (southeast of Adrianople), and Constantinople, held in 359–60 by Emperor Constantius II, formulated creeds that were intended to replace or revise the Nicene Creed; in particular, to find alternatives for "homoousios." These councils are no longer regarded as Ecumenical Councils in the tradition of the Church; their creeds, which are at odds with the Nicene Creed, are known as Arian Creeds.

During this time, Athanasius was at the center of the controversy and became the "champion of orthodoxy" after Alexander died. To Athanasius, Arius's interpretation of Jesus's nature (Homoiousian), that the Father and Son are similar but not identical in substance, could not explain how Jesus could accomplish the redemption of humankind which is the foundational principle of Christianity. "According to Athanasius, God had to become human so that humans could become divine ... That led him to conclude that the divine nature in Jesus was identical to that of the Father, and that Father and Son have the same substance" (homoousios). Athanasius's teaching was a major influence in the West, especially on Theodosius I.

On 28 February 380, Theodosius, along with Gratian and Valentinian II, issued the Edict of Thessalonica, a decree addressed to the city of Constantinople, determining that only Christians who believed in the consubstantiality of God the Father, Son and Holy Spirit could style themselves "catholic" and have their own places of worship officially recognized as "churches"; deviants were labeled heretics and described as "out of their minds and insane". (Note: This text has been translated to English by Clyde Pharr in the following way: Emperors Gratian, Valentinian, and Theodosius Augustuses An Edict to the People of the City of Constantinople. It is Our will that all the peoples who are ruled by the administration of Our Clemency shall practice that religion which the divine Peter the Apostle transmitted to the Romans, as the religion which he introduced makes clear even unto this day. It is evident that this is the religion that is followed by the Pontiff Damasus and by Peter, Bishop of Alexandria, a man of apostolic sanctity; that is, according to the apostolic discipline and the evangelic doctrine, we shall believe in the single Deity of the Father, the Son, and the Holy Spirit, under the concept of equal majesty and of the Holy Trinity. We command that those persons who follow this rule shall embrace the name of Catholic Christians. The rest, however, whom We adjudge demented and insane, shall sustain the infamy of heretical dogmas, their meeting places shall not receive the name of churches, and they shall be smitten first by divine vengeance and secondly by the retribution of Our own initiative, which We shall assume in accordance with the divine judgment. Given on the third day before the kalends of March at Thessalonica in the year of the fifth consulship of Gratian Augustus and the first consulship of Theodosius Augustus. – 28 February 380.)

Recent scholarship has tended to reject former views that the edict was a key step in establishing Christianity as the official religion of the Empire, since it was aimed exclusively at Constantinople and seems to have gone largely unnoticed by contemporaries outside the capital. For example, German ancient historian Karl Leo Noethlichs writes that the Edict of Thessalonica was neither anti-pagan nor antisemitic; it did not declare Christianity to be the official religion of the empire; and it gave no advantage to Christians over other faiths. It is clear from mandates issued in the years after 380 that Theodosius had made no requirement for pagans or Jews to convert to Christianity. (Note: Hungarian legal scholar Pál Sáry explains that, "In 393, the emperor was gravely disturbed that the Jewish assemblies had been forbidden in certain places. For this reason, he stated with emphasis that the sect of the Jews was forbidden by no law. It is also important to note that during the reign of Theodosius pagans were continuously appointed to prominent positions and pagan aristocrats remained in high offices." The Edict applied only to Christians, and within that group, only to Arians. It declared those Christians who refused the Nicene faith to be infames, and prohibited them from using Christian churches. Sáry uses this example: "After his arrival in Constantinople, Theodosius offered to confirm the Arian bishop Demophilus in his see, if he would accept the Nicene Creed. After Demophilus refused the offer, the emperor immediately directed him to surrender all his churches to the Catholics." Christianity became the religion of the Late Empire through a long evolutionary process, of which the Edict of Thessalonica was only a small part.) Nonetheless, the edict is the first known secular Roman law to positively define a religious orthodoxy.

According to Robinson Thornton, Theodosius began taking steps to repress Arianism immediately after his baptism in 380. On 26 November 380, two days after he had arrived in Constantinople, Theodosius expelled the Homoian bishop, Demophilus of Constantinople, and appointed Meletius patriarch of Antioch, and Gregory of Nazianzus, one of the Cappadocian Fathers from Cappadocia (today in Turkey), patriarch of Constantinople. Theodosius had just been baptized, by bishop Ascholius of Thessalonica, during a severe illness.

In May 381, Theodosius summoned a new ecumenical council at Constantinople to repair the schism between East and West on the basis of Nicene orthodoxy. The council went on to define orthodoxy, including the Third Person of the Trinity, the Holy Spirit, as equal to the Father and 'proceeding' from Him. The council also "condemned the Apollonarian and Macedonian heresies, clarified jurisdictions of the bishops according to the civil boundaries of dioceses. and ruled that Constantinople was second in precedence to Rome."

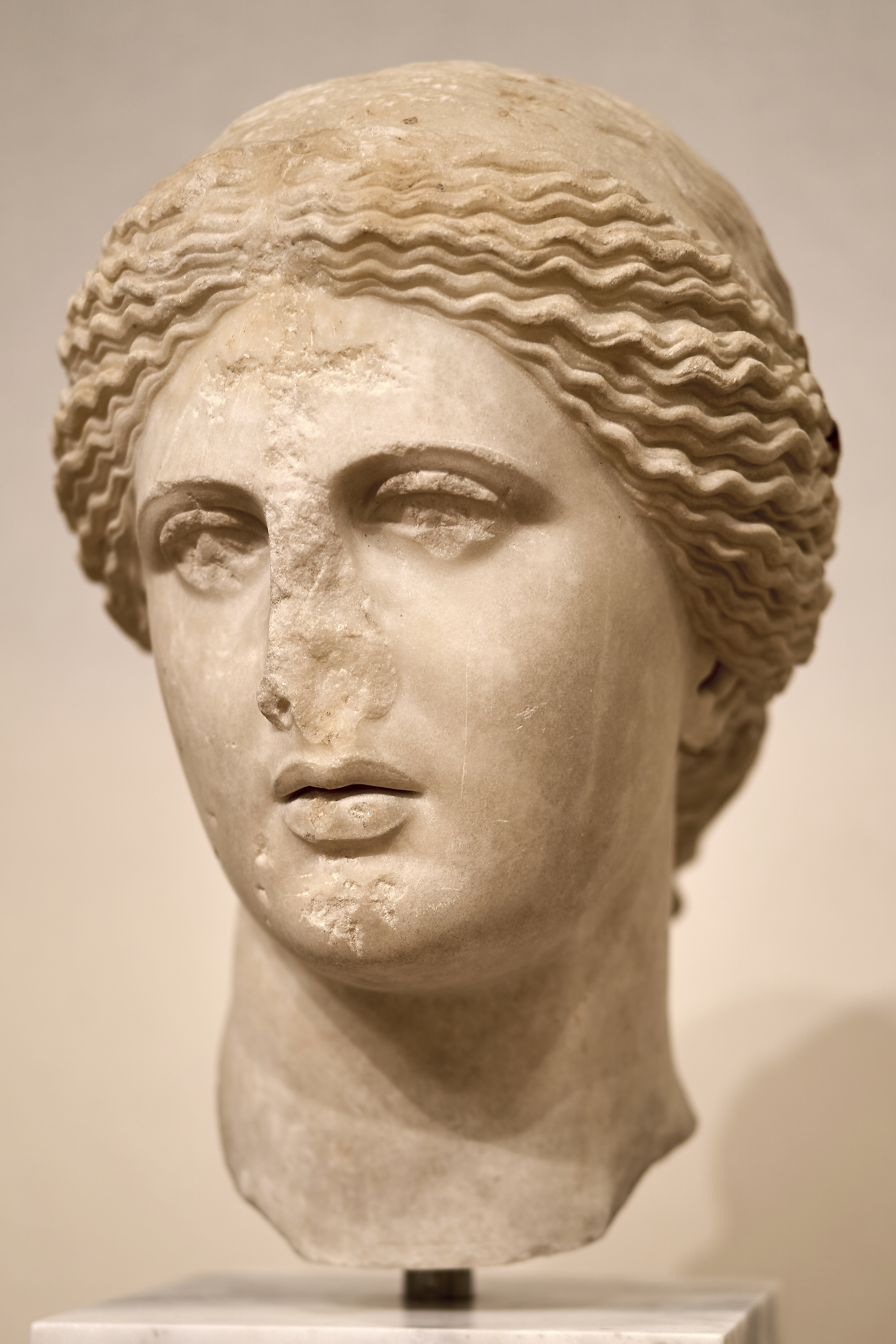
Head of the Greek goddess Aphrodite with a cross carved into its forehead. Theodosius I supported anti-pagan policies during his reign in favor of Nicene Christianity as the official state religion.

=== Policy towards paganism ===
Theodosius seems to have adopted a cautious policy toward traditional non-Christian cults, reiterating his Christian predecessors' bans on animal sacrifice, divination, and apostasy, while allowing other pagan practices to be performed publicly and temples to remain open. He also voiced his support for the preservation of temple buildings, but nonetheless failed to prevent the damaging of many holy sites, images and objects of piety by Christian zealots, some including even his own officials. Theodosius also turned pagan holidays into workdays, but the festivals associated with them continued. A number of laws against paganism were issued towards the end of his reign, in 391 and 392, but historians have tended to downplay their practical effects and even the emperor's direct role in them. Modern scholars think there is little if any evidence Theodosius pursued an active and sustained policy against the traditional cults.

There is evidence that Theodosius took care to prevent the empire's still substantial pagan population from feeling ill-disposed toward his rule. Following the death in 388 of his praetorian prefect, Cynegius, who had vandalized a number of pagan shrines in the eastern provinces, Theodosius replaced him with a moderate pagan who subsequently moved to protect the temples. During his first official tour of Italy (389–391), the emperor won over the influential pagan lobby in the Roman Senate by appointing its foremost members to important administrative posts. Theodosius also nominated the last pair of pagan consuls in Roman history (Tatianus and Symmachus) in 391.

==== Temple destruction ====
Contemporary archaeology has found that the area with the most destruction against temples by Christians took place in the territory around Constantinople in the diocese of Orientis (the East) under Theodosius's prefect, Maternus Cynegius, where archaeological digs have discovered several destroyed temples. Theodosius officially supported temple preservation, but Garth Fowden says Cynegius did not limit himself to Theodosius's official policy, but instead, commissioned temple destruction on a wide scale, even employing the military under his command for this purpose. Christopher Haas also says Cynegius oversaw temple closings, the prohibition of sacrifices, and the destruction of temples in Osrhoene, Carrhae, and Beroea.

Earlier scholars believed Cynegius's actions were just part of a tide of violence against temples that continued throughout the 390s. However, recent archaeological discoveries have undermined this view. The archaeological evidence for the violent destruction of temples in the fourth and early fifth centuries around the entire Mediterranean is limited to a handful of sites. Temple destruction is attested to in 43 cases in the written sources, but only 4 of them were confirmed by archaeological evidence. Trombley and MacMullen say part of what creates this discrepancy are details in the historical sources that are commonly ambiguous and unclear. For example, Malalas claimed Constantine destroyed all the temples, then he said Theodosius did, then he said Constantine converted them all to churches. There is no evidence of any desire on the part of the emperor to institute a systematic destruction of temples anywhere in the Theodosian Code, and no evidence in the archaeological record that extensive temple destruction ever took place.

==== Theodosian decrees ====
According to The Cambridge Ancient History, the Theodosian Law Code is a set of laws, originally dated from Constantine to Theodosius I, that were gathered together, organized by theme, and reissued throughout the empire between 389 and 391. Jill Harries explains that, in their original forms, these laws were created by different emperors and governors to resolve the issues of a particular place at a particular time. They were not intended as general laws. Local politics and culture had produced divergent attitudes, and as a result, these laws present a series of conflicting opinions: for example, some laws called for the complete destruction of the temples and others for their preservation. French historian of Antiquity, Philippe Fleury, observes that Ammianus Marcellinus says this legal complexity produced corruption, forgery of rescripts, falsified appeals, and costly judicial delays.

The Theodosian Law Code has long been one of the principal historical sources for the study of Late Antiquity. Gibbon described the Theodosian decrees, in his Memoires, as a work of history rather than jurisprudence. Brown says the language of these laws is uniformly vehement, and penalties are harsh and frequently horrifying, leading some historians, such as Ramsay MacMullen, to see them as a 'declaration of war' on traditional religious practices. It is a common belief the laws marked a turning point in the decline of paganism.

Yet, many contemporary scholars such as Lepelly, Brown and Cameron, question the use of the Code, a legal document, not an actual historical work, for understanding history. One of many problems with using the Theodosian Code as a record of history is described by archaeologists Luke Lavan and Michael Mulryan. They explain that the Code can be seen to document "Christian ambition" but not historic reality. The overtly violent fourth century that one would expect to find from taking the laws at face value is not supported by archaeological evidence from around the Mediterranean.

==== End of paganism ====
The picture of Theodosius as "the most pious emperor", who presided over the end of paganism through the aggressive application of law and coercion – a view which R. Malcolm Errington says "has dominated the European historical tradition almost to this day" – was first written by Theodoret who, in Errington's view, had a habit of ignoring facts and cherry picking. In the centuries following his death, Theodosius gained a reputation as the champion of orthodoxy and the vanquisher of paganism, but modern historians contest the latter interpretation. (Note: Cameron explains that, since Theodosius's predecessors Constantine, Constantius, and Valens had all been semi-Arians, it fell to the orthodox Theodosius to receive from Christian literary tradition most of the credit for the final triumph of Christianity. Numerous literary sources, both Christian and even pagan, attributed to Theodosius – probably mistakenly, possibly intentionally – initiatives such as the withdrawal of state funding to pagan cults (this measure belongs to Gratian) and the demolition of temples (for which there is no primary evidence in the law codes or archaeology). Theodosius has long been associated with the ending of the Vestal virgins, but twenty-first century scholarship asserts they continued until 415 and suffered no more under Theodosius than they had since Gratian restricted their finances. Theodosius also probably did not discontinue the ancient Olympic Games, whose last recorded celebration was in 393. Archeological evidence indicates that some games were still held after this date. Sofie Remijsen says there are several reasons to conclude the Olympic games continued after Theodosius I, and came to an end under Theodosius II, by accident, instead. There are two extant scholia on Lucian that connect the end of the games with a fire that burned down the temple of the Olympian Zeus during Theodosius II's reign.)

An increase in the variety and abundance of sources has brought about the reinterpretation of religion of this era. According to Salzman: "Although the debate on the death of paganism continues, scholars ...by and large, concur that the once dominant notion of overt pagan-Christian religious conflict cannot fully explain the texts and artifacts or the social, religious, and political realities of Late Antique Rome".

Scholars agree that Theodosius gathered copious legislation on religious subjects, and that he continued the practices of his predecessors, prohibiting sacrifices with the intent of divining the future in December of 380, issuing a decree against heretics on 10 January 381, and an edict against Manichaeism in May of that same year. Theodosius convened the First Council of Constantinople, the second ecumenical council after Constantine's First Council of Nicaea in 325; and the Constantinopolitan council which ended on 9 July. What is important about this, according to Errington, is how much this 'copious legislation' was applied and used, which would show how dependable it is as a reflection of actual history.

Brown asserts that Christians still comprised a minority of the overall population, and local authorities were still mostly pagan and lax in imposing anti-pagan laws; even Christian bishops frequently obstructed their application. Harries says, "The contents of the Code provide details from the canvas but are an unreliable guide, in isolation, to the character of the picture as a whole". Previously undervalued similarities in language, society, religion, and the arts, as well as current archaeological research, indicate paganism slowly declined, and that it was not forcefully overthrown by Theodosius I in the fourth century.

Maijastina Kahlos writes that the fourth century Roman empire contained a wide variety of religions, cults, sects, beliefs and practices and they all generally co-existed without incident. Coexistence did occasionally lead to violence, but such outbreaks were relatively infrequent and localized. Jan N. Bremmer says that "religious violence in Late Antiquity is mostly restricted to violent rhetoric: 'in Antiquity, not all religious violence was that religious, and not all religious violence was that violent'".

The Christian church believed that victory over "false gods" had begun with Jesus and was completed through the conversion of Constantine; it was a victory that took place in heaven, rather than on earth, since Christians were only about 15–18% of the empire's population in the early 300s. Brown indicates that, as a result of this "triumphalism," paganism was seen as vanquished, and Salzman adds that judging by the sheer number of laws, heresy was a much higher priority than paganism for Christians in the fourth and fifth centuries.

Lavan says Christian writers gave the narrative of victory high visibility, but that it does not necessarily correlate to actual conversion rates. There are many signs that paganism continued into the fifth century, and in some places, into the sixth and beyond. According to Brown, Christians objected to anything that called the triumphal narrative into question, and that included the mistreatment of non-Christians. Archaeology indicates that in most regions away from the imperial court, the end of paganism was both gradual and untraumatic. The Oxford Handbook of Late Antiquity says that "Torture and murder were not the inevitable result of the rise of Christianity." Instead, there was fluidity in the boundaries between the communities and "coexistence with a competitive spirit." Brown says that "In most areas, polytheists were not molested, and, apart from a few ugly incidents of local violence, Jewish communities also enjoyed a century of stable, even privileged, existence."

While conceding that Theodosius's reign may have been a watershed in the decline of the old religions, Cameron downplays the role of the emperor's 'copious legislation' as limited in effect, and writes that Theodosius did 'certainly not' ban paganism. In his 2020 biography of Theodosius, Mark Hebblewhite concludes that Theodosius never saw or advertised himself as a destroyer of the old cults; rather, the emperor's efforts to promote Christianity were cautious, 'targeted, tactical, and nuanced', and intended to prevent political instability and religious discord.

== Art patronage ==
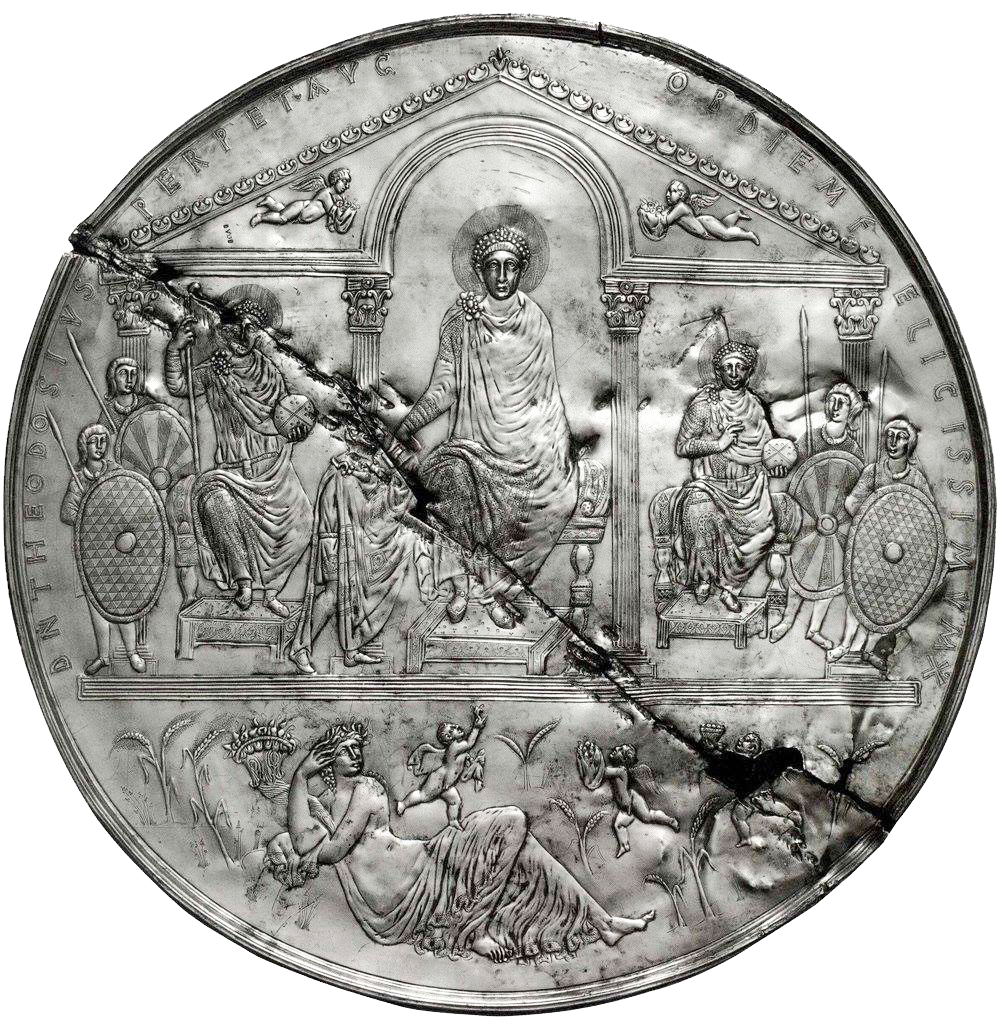
Missorium of Theodosius, found in 1847 in Almendralejo, Spain

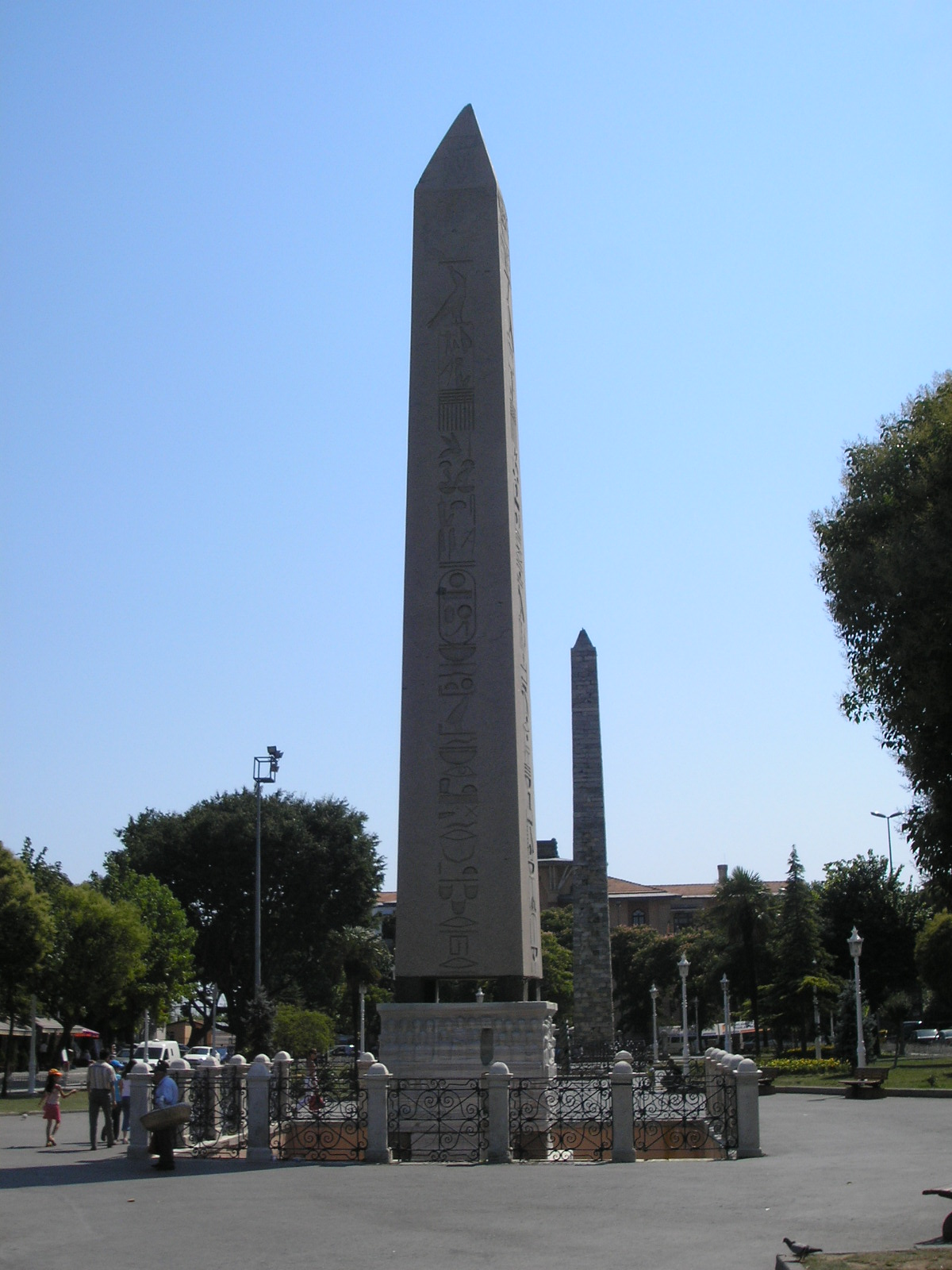
View of the Hippodrome of Constantinople with the surviving Obelisk of Theodosius

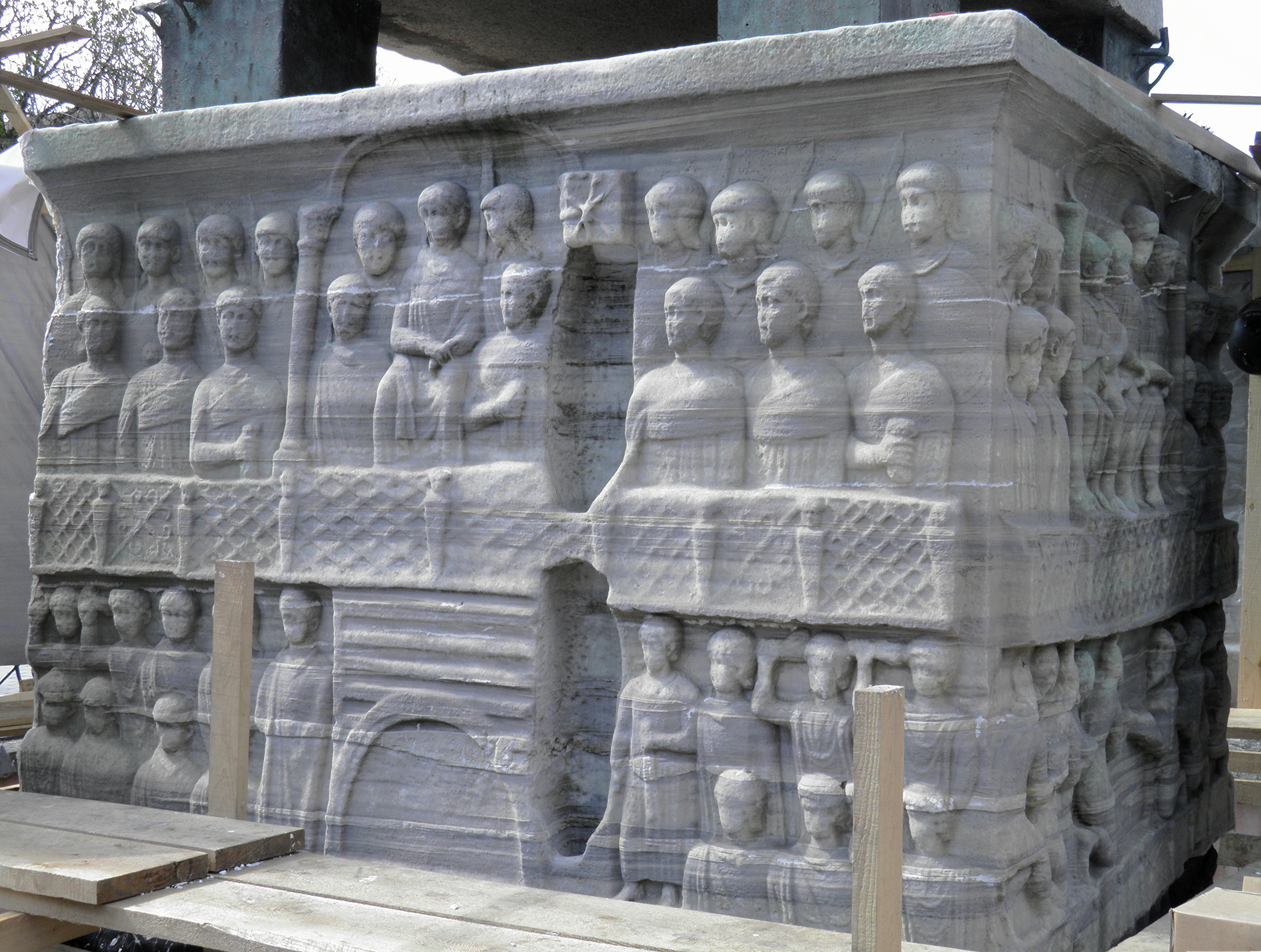
The Obelisk of Theodosius, details of the base of the Obelisk of Thutmose III, Hippodrome, Istanbul (8370192180)

According to art historian David Wright, art of the era around the year 400 reflects optimism amongst the traditional polytheists. This is likely connected to what Ine Jacobs calls a renaissance of classical styles of art in the Theodosian period (AD 379–395) often referred to in modern scholarship as the Theodosian renaissance. The Forum Tauri in Constantinople was renamed and redecorated as the Forum of Theodosius, including a column and a triumphal arch in his honour. The missorium of Theodosius, the city of Aprodisias's statue of the emperor, the base of the Obelisk of Theodosius, the columns of Theodosius and Arcadius, and the diptych of Probus were all commissioned by the court and reflect a similar renaissance of classicism.

According to Armin Wirsching, two obelisks were shipped by the Romans from Karnak to Alexandria in 13/12 BC. In 357, Constantius II had one (that became known as the Lateran obelisk) shipped to Rome. Wirsching says the Romans had previously watched and learned from the Egyptians how to transport such large heavy objects, so they constructed "a special sea‐going version of the Nile vessels ... – a double‐ship with three hulls". In 390, Theodosius oversaw the removal of the other to Constantinople.

The obelisk with its sculpted base in the former Hippodrome of Constantinople is well known as a rare datable work of Late Antique art. A sixth-century source puts the raising of the obelisk in the year 390, and Greek and Latin epigrams on the plinth (the lower part of the base) credit Theodosius I and the urban prefect Proclus with this feat.

Linda Safran says that relocating the obelisk was motivated by Theodosius's victory over "the tyrants" (most likely Maximus Magnus and his son Victor). It is now known as the obelisk of Theodosius and still stands in the Hippodrome of Constantinople, the long Roman circus that was, at one time, the centre of Constantinople's public life. Re-erecting the monolith was a challenge for the technology that had been honed in the construction of siege engines.

The obelisk's white marble base is entirely covered with bas-reliefs documenting Theodosius's imperial household and the engineering feat of removing the obelisk to Constantinople. Theodosius and the imperial family are separated from the nobles among the spectators in the imperial box, with a cover over them as a mark of their status. From the perspective of style, it has served as "the key monument in identifying a so-called Theodosian court style, which is usually described as a "renaissance" of earlier Roman classicism".

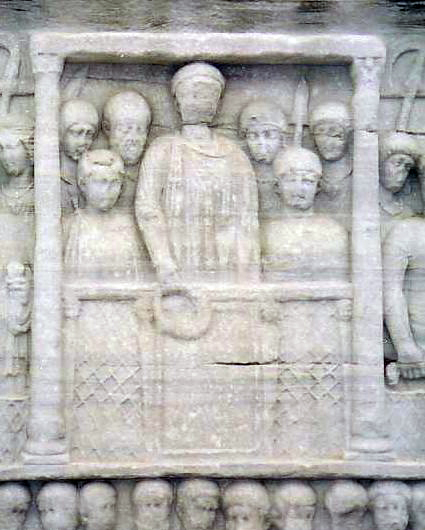
Theodosius offers a laurel wreath to the victor, on the marble base of the Obelisk of Thutmosis III at the Hippodrome of Constantinople.

== Death ==
Theodosius suffered from a disease involving severe edema. He died in Mediolanum (Milan) on 17 January 395, and his body lay in state in the palace there for forty days. His funeral was held in the cathedral on 25 February. In the presence of Stilicho and Honorius, Bishop Ambrose delivered the panegyric De obitu Theodosii, which praised Theodosius's suppression of paganism.

On 8 November 395, his body was transferred to Constantinople, where according to the Chronicon Paschale he was buried in the Church of the Holy Apostles. He was honored as: Divus Theodosius, lit. 'the Divine Theodosius'. He was interred in a porphyry sarcophagus that was described in the 10th century by Constantine VII Porphyrogenitus in his work De Ceremoniis.

== Marriage and issue ==
Theodosius married twice.

His first wife was Aelia Flaccilla, married in 376 and dead in 386. By her he had three children:

- Arcadius (377 - 408), Roman emperor;
- Aelia Pulcheria (378 - 385);
- Honorius (384 - 423), Roman emperor.

His second wife was Galla, married in 387 and died in childbirth in 394. By her he had three children:

- Gratian (388/389 - before 395);
- Galla Placidia (392/393 - 450), Roman Empress;
- John (394), stillbirth.

== Honorific ==
Theodosius was initially styled "the Great" simply as a way to differentiate him from his grandson Theodosius II. Later, at the Council of Chalcedon in 451, the honorific was deemed merited due to his promotion of Nicene Christianity.

== Veneration ==
Theodosius the Great is venerated in Eastern and Oriental Orthodox Churches:

- 17 January – Eastern Orthodox Church commemoration,
- 18 January – Ethiopian Church commemorates Theodosius, the righteous emperor,
- 19 January – Armenian Apostolic Church,

Emperor (king) Theodosius is commemorated in Armenian Anaphora with saint kings: Abgar, Constantine and Tiridates.

In Eastern Orthodox Church he is commemorated as ktetor of Vatopedi and donator of Vatopedi icon of the Mother of God.

== See also ==
- Battle of Frigidus
- De fide Catolica
- Galla Placidia, daughter of Theodosius
- List of Byzantine emperors
- Roman emperors family tree
- Saint Fana
- Serena, niece of Theodosius and wife of Flavius Stilicho
- Zosimus, pagan historian from the time of Anastasius I

== Citations ==
Regnal titles
Preceded by Gratian and Valens	Roman emperor 379–395; With: Gratian, Valentinian II, Honorius, Magnus Maximus, Victor, Eugenius, Arcadius	Succeeded by Honorius and Arcadius
Political offices
Preceded by Ausonius; Q. Clodius Hermogenianus Olybrius	Roman consul 380 with Gratian Augustus V	Succeeded by Syagrius; Eucherius
Preceded by Valentinian Augustus III; Eutropius	Roman consul II; 388 with Maternus Cynegius	Succeeded by Timasius; Promotus
Preceded by Arcadius Augustus II; Rufinus	Roman consul III; 393 with Abundantius	Succeeded by Arcadius Augustus III; Honorius Augustus II
