= Eutychianus (consul 398) =

Politician of the Roman Empire (388–405)

Flavius Eutychianus or Eutychian (Greek: Ευτυχιανός; fl. 388–405) was a politician of the Eastern Roman Empire.

== Biography ==
Eutychian was the son of the Consul of 361, Taurus; it is known that he had a wife. He should be identified with the character of Typhon in the allegorical work Aegyptus sive de providentia, by Synesius, where he represents the pro-Gothic party; Synesius said that he had a wild and reckless youth. He converted to Arianism, the form of Christianity professed by the Goths.

He was comes sacrarum largitionum; in 388, the rhetor Libanius wrote him to ask a favor regarding a delegation of his own city, Antioch, at the court, and in 390 the same Libanius defines Eutychian as influential at court.

Eutychian was praetorian prefect in 396–397, probably for the prefecture of Illyricum, as attested by some laws of the Theodosian Code and alluded to by Synesius. He was the praetorian prefect of the East from 397 to 399, and in 398 he held the consulate. On the occasion of the fall of Eutropius (summer 399), Eutychian was deposed and replaced by Aurelianus, but after just a year he was back in office at the behest of Gainas, the powerful Gothic magister militum who held in check the Emperor Arcadius; after Gainas fled from Constantinople, however, Eutychian was deposed (July 12, 400).

Between 404 and 405, he was praetorian prefect of the East for a second time.

== Bibliography ==
- Martindale, John R.; Jones, A. H. M.; Morris, John, eds. (1971). "Flavius Eutychianus 5". The Prosopography of the Later Roman Empire: Volume I, AD 260–395. Cambridge: Cambridge University Press. pp. 319–321. ISBN 0-521-07233-6.

Political offices
Preceded by Caesarius; Nonius Atticus	Roman consul 398 with Honorius	Succeeded by Mallius Theodorus; Eutropius
Preceded by Caesarius (I)	Praetorian prefect of the East; 397–399	Succeeded by Aurelianus (I)
Preceded by Aurelianus (I)	Praetorian prefect of the East; 399–400	Succeeded by Caesarius II
Preceded by Caesarius II	Praetorian prefect of the East; 404–405	Succeeded by Anthemius
