= Aristaenetus (disambiguation) =

Aristaenetus may refer to:

- Aristaenetus, 5th/6th century epistolographer
- Aristaenetus (consul), Roman consul in 404
- Aristaenetus, an Achaean general who commanded the cavalry on the right wing in the Battle of Mantineia in 207 BCE
