= Abundantius (consul) =

Roman consul

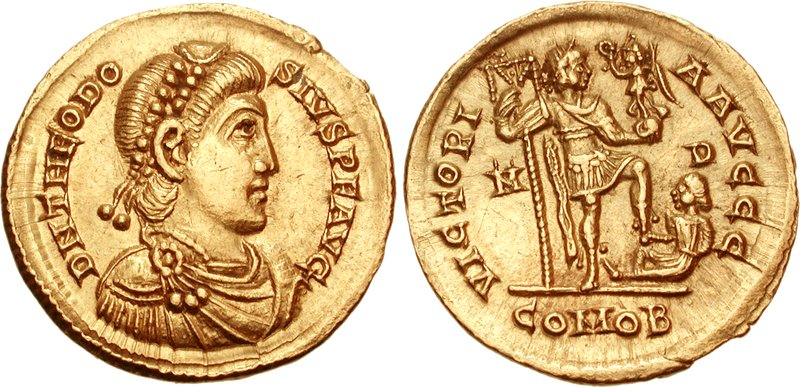
Solidus of Theodosius I, whose reign was the high point of Abundantius's career.

Flavius Abundantius (floruit 375 – 400) was a politician in the Eastern Roman Empire.

Of Scythian origin, he entered the Roman army under emperor Gratian (367-375) and climbed up its ranks until around 392, when emperor Theodosius I (378-395) made him magister utriusque militiae. In 393 he also held the consulate.

The powerful eunuch and courtier Eutropius, who had been introduced by Abundantius into the court caused his downfall because he longed for Abundantius' properties. In 396 Eutropius had the new emperor Arcadius exile Abundantius at Pityus on the Black Sea (current Pitsunda in Abkhazia, Georgia) and give all his properties to Eutropius himself. When Eutropius died (399), Abundantius succeeded in being transferred to the more comfortable Sidon, where he was still alive in 400.

Political offices
Preceded by Arcadius Augustus II; Rufinus	Consul of the Roman Empire; 393 with Theodosius Augustus II	Succeeded by Arcadius Augustus III, Honorius Augustus II, Virius Nicomachus Flavianus
