= Honorius =

Western Roman emperor from 393 to 423

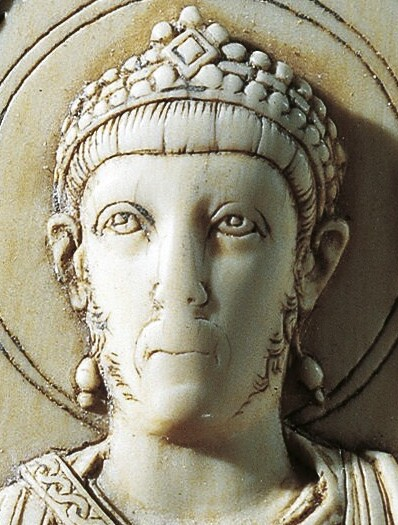
- Detail of Honorius as depicted on the consular diptych of Probus, AD 406

Roman emperor of the West
- Augustus: 23 January 393 – 15 August 423 (senior from 17 January 395)
- Predecessor: Theodosius I
- Successor: Joannes
- Co-rulers: Arcadius (East, 393–408); Theodosius II (East, 402–423); Attalus (Rome, 409–410); Constantine III (Gaul, 409–411); Constans II (Gaul, 409–411); Constantius III (West, 421)
- Born: 9 September 384; Constantinople
- Died: 15 August 423 (aged 38); Ravenna, Italy
- Burial: Old St. Peter's Basilica
- Spouse: Maria (m. 398, d. 407); Thermantia (m. 408, divorced)
Regnal name
- Imperator Caesar Flavius Honorius Augustus
- Dynasty: Theodosian
- Father: Theodosius I
- Mother: Aelia Flaccilla
- Religion: Nicene Christianity

Honorius (/hoʊˈnɔːriəs/; 9 September 384 – 15 August 423) was Roman emperor from 393 to 423. He was the younger son of emperor Theodosius I and his first wife Aelia Flaccilla. After the death of Theodosius in 395, Honorius, under the regency of Stilicho, ruled the western half of the empire while his brother Arcadius ruled the eastern half. His reign over the Western Roman Empire was precarious and chaotic. In 410, Rome was sacked for the first time since the Battle of the Allia almost 800 years prior.

== Family ==
Honorius was born to Emperor Theodosius I and Empress Aelia Flaccilla on 9 September 384 in Constantinople. He was the brother of Arcadius and Pulcheria. In 386, his mother died, and in 387, Theodosius married Galla who had taken a temporary refuge in Thessaloniki with her family, including her brother Valentinian II and mother Justina, away from usurper Magnus Maximus. Theodosius and Galla had a daughter, Honorius's half-sister Galla Placidia. Honorius, Arcadius, and Galla Placidia were the only children of Theodosius to survive into adulthood.

== Emperor ==
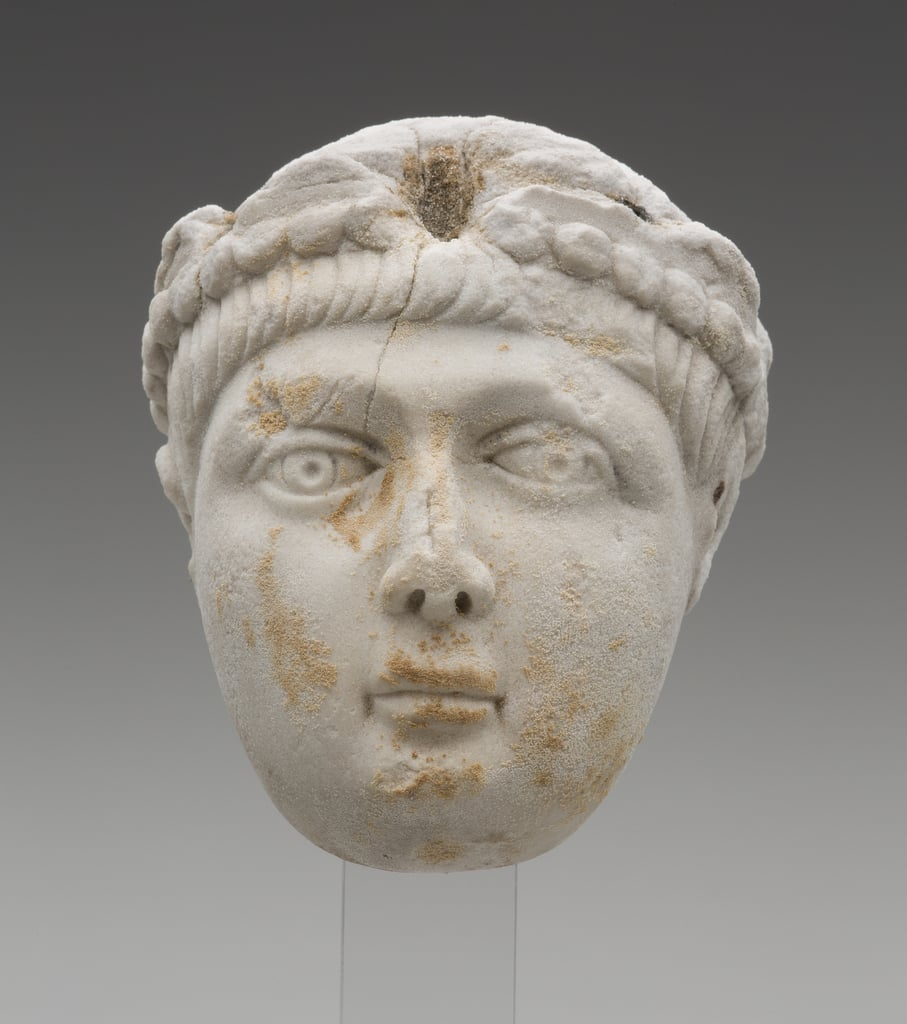
Marble head of Honorius, 393–394.

=== Early reign ===
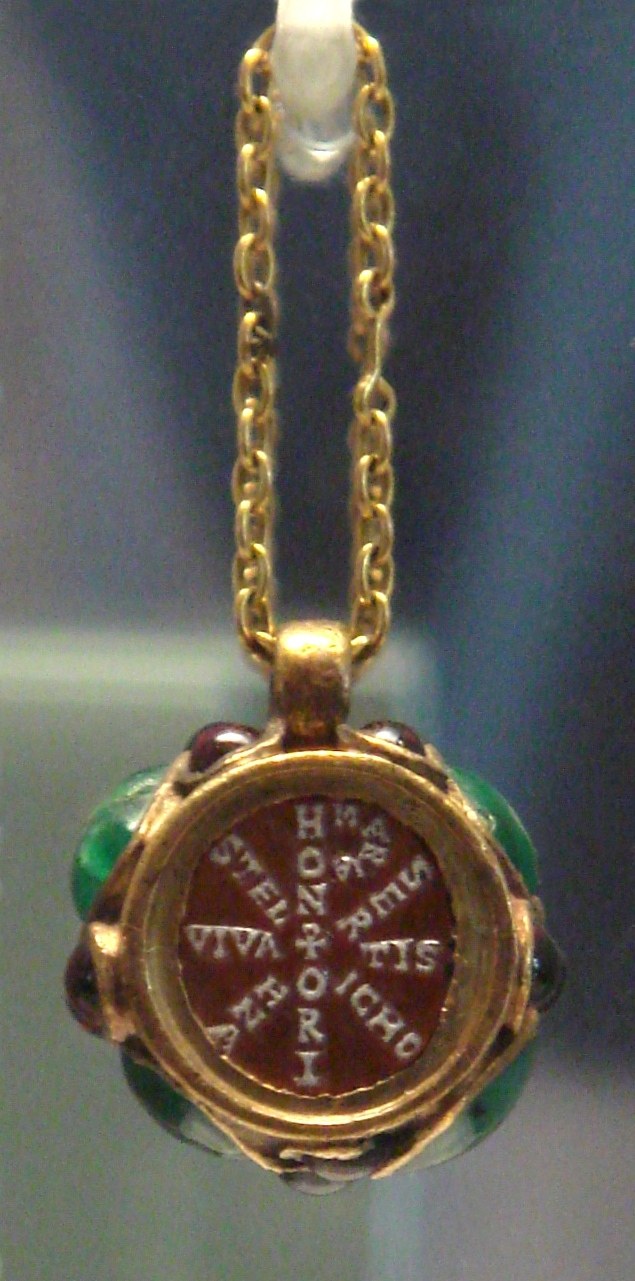
Christian pendant of Empress Maria, daughter of Stilicho, and wife of Honorius. The pendant reads, around a central cross (clockwise): HONORI MARIA SERHNA VIVATIS STELICHO. Latin and Greek characters were intermingled in this one. The letters form a Christogram. Louvre, Paris.

After holding the consulate at the age of two in 386, Honorius was declared augustus by his father Theodosius I, and thus co-ruler, on 23 January 393, after the death of Valentinian II and the usurpation of Eugenius. When Theodosius died in January 395, Honorius and Arcadius divided the Empire. Honorius became Western Roman emperor at the age of ten.

During the early part of his reign, Honorius depended on the military leadership of the general Stilicho, who had been appointed by Theodosius and was of mixed Vandal and Roman ancestry. To strengthen his bonds with the young emperor and to make his grandchild an imperial heir, Stilicho married his daughter Maria to Honorius. The epithalamion written for the occasion by Stilicho's court poet Claudian survives. Honorius was also influenced by the Popes of Rome: Pope Innocent I and Western bishops may have successfully persuaded Honorius to write to his brother, arguing for convening a synod in Thessalonica.

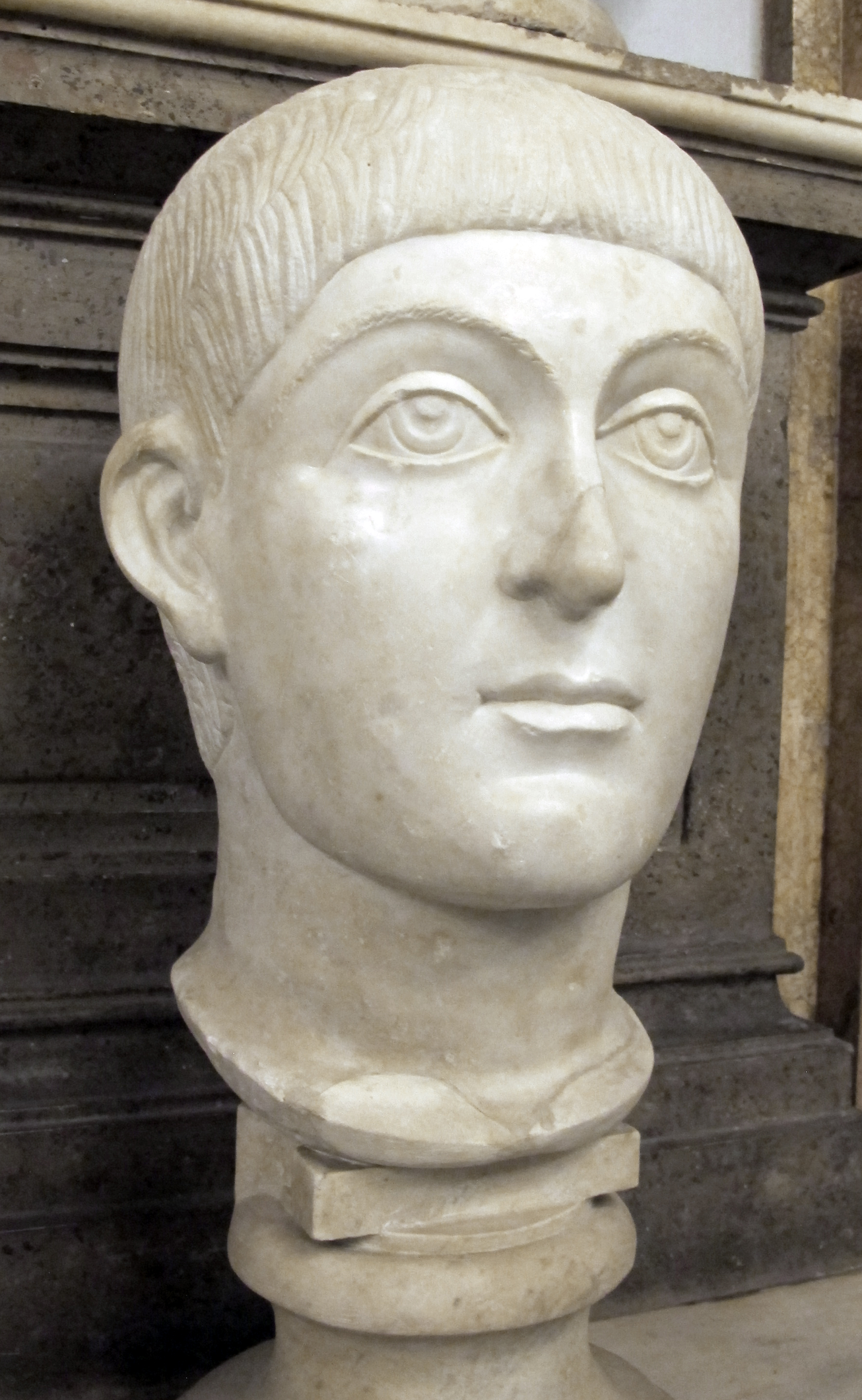
Colossal marble head of a youthful emperor, possibly Honorius (Musei Capitolini)

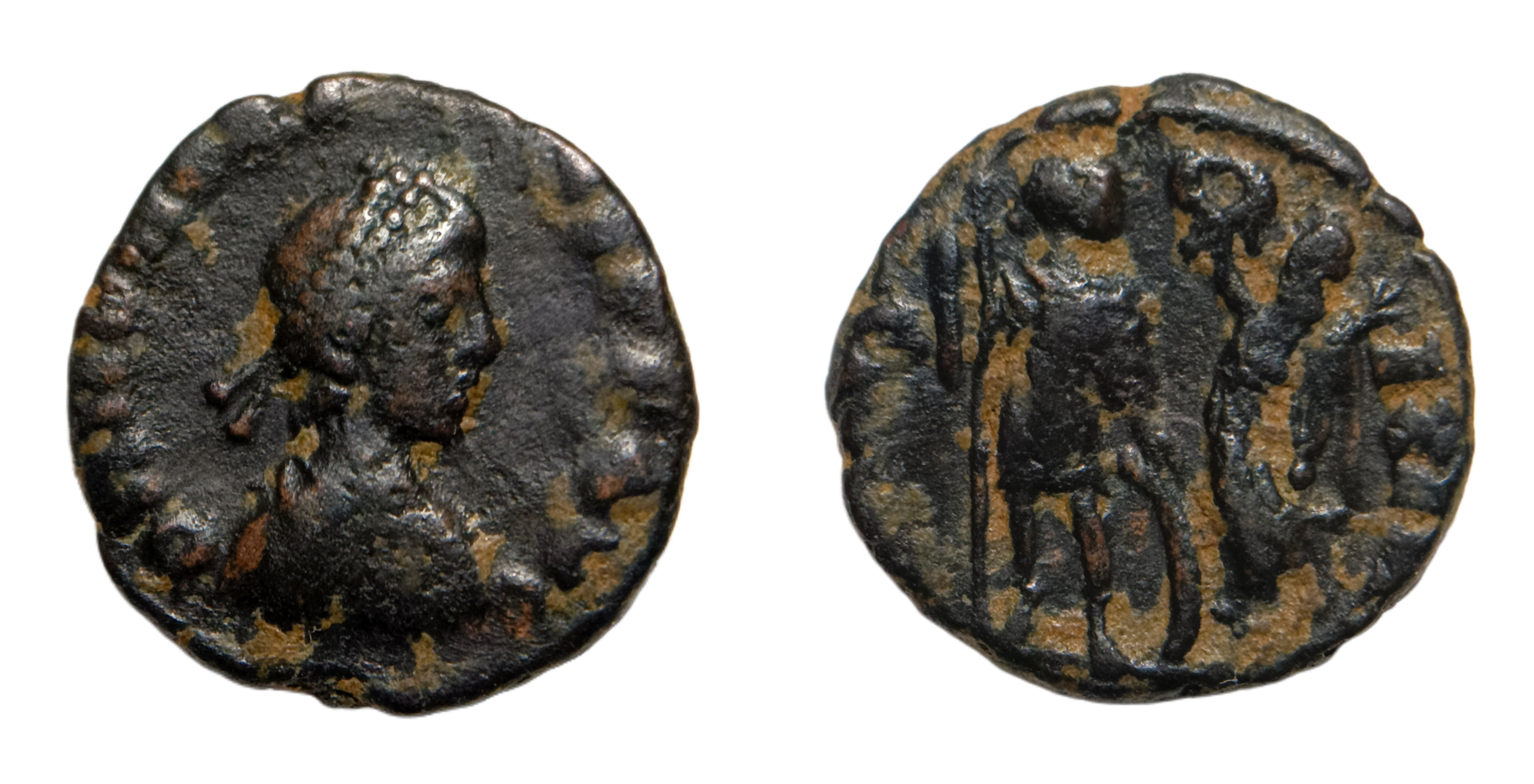
A coin of Honorius with his portrait on the obverse.

At first Honorius based his capital in Milan, but when the Visigoths under King Alaric I entered Italy in 401 he moved his capital to the coastal city of Ravenna, which was protected by a ring of marshes and strong fortifications. While the new capital was easier to defend, it was poorly situated to allow Roman forces to protect Central Italy from the increasingly regular threat of barbarian incursions. It is significant that the Emperor's residence remained in Ravenna until the overthrow of Romulus Augustulus in 476. The greater ease with which Ravenna could be defended was probably the reason why Ravenna was chosen not only as the capital of the Ostrogothic Kingdom in Italy, but also for the seat of the Byzantine exarchs as well.

=== Stilicho and the defence of Italy ===
Honorius's reign experienced continued barbarian incursions into Gaul, Italy and Hispania. At the same time, a host of usurpers rose up.

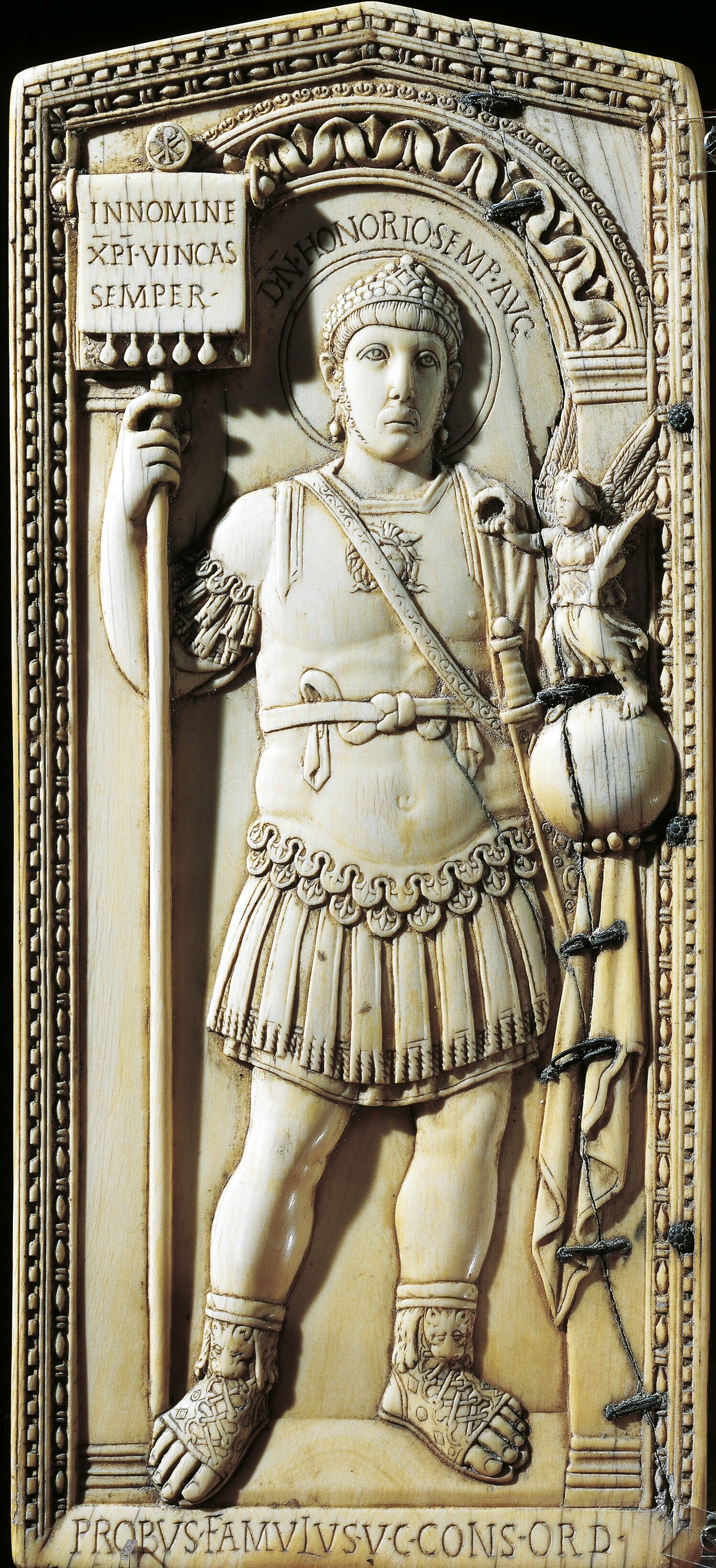
Honorius on the consular diptych of Anicius Petronius Probus (406)

First Gildo, the comes of Africa and magister utriusque militiae per Africam in Northern Africa, led a revolt which lasted for two years (397–398). Stilicho eventually subdued it through the local command of Mascezel, Gildo's brother.

The next crisis was the Visigothic invasion of Italy in 402 under the command of their king, Alaric I. Stilicho was absent in Raetia in the latter months of 401, when Alaric, who was also the Eastern Empire's magister militum in Illyricum, suddenly marched with a large army through the Julian Alps and entered Italy.

Stilicho hurried back to protect Honorius and the legions of Gaul and Britain were summoned to defend Italy. Honorius, at Milan, was besieged by Alaric, who marched into Liguria. Stilicho narrowly defeated Alaric at Pollentia, on the river Tanarus on Easter Day (6 April 402). Alaric then moved to Verona, with Stilicho in pursuit, and the two fought an inconclusive battle. The Visigoths were allowed to retreat back to Illyricum. In 405 Radagaisus led a vast army across the Danube and invaded Italy. The ensuing war brought devastation to the heart of the Empire, until Stilicho defeated the invaders in 406 and recruited most of them into his own army. Simultaneously, in 405 or 406, a number of tribes, according to some sources including Vandals, Alans, and Suebi, crossed the Rhine and invaded Gaul.

The situation in Britain was even more difficult. The British provinces were isolated, lacking support from the Empire, and the soldiers supported the revolts of Marcus (406–407), Gratian (407), and Constantine III. Leaving his son Constans to rule over Britain, Constantine invaded Gaul in 407 and occupied Arles. In 410 the emperor issued the Rescript of Honorius in reply to a British plea for assistance against local barbarian incursions. Preoccupied with the Visigoths, Honorius lacked any military capability to assist the distant province. According to the sixth century Byzantine scholar Zosimus, "Honorius wrote letters to the cities in Britain, bidding them to guard themselves." This sentence is located randomly in the middle of a discussion of southern Italy; no further mention of Britain is made, which has led some modern academics to suggest that the rescript does not apply to Britain, but to Bruttium in Italy.

The western empire was effectively overstretched due to the massive invasion of Alans, Suebi and Vandals who, although they had been repulsed from Italy in 406, moved into Gaul on 31 December 406, and arrived in Hispania in 409. In early 408, Stilicho attempted to strengthen his position at court by marrying his second daughter, Thermantia, to Honorius after the death of the Empress Maria in 407. Another invasion by Alaric was prevented in 408, when Stilicho forced the Roman Senate to pay 4,000 pounds of gold to persuade the Goths to leave Italy.

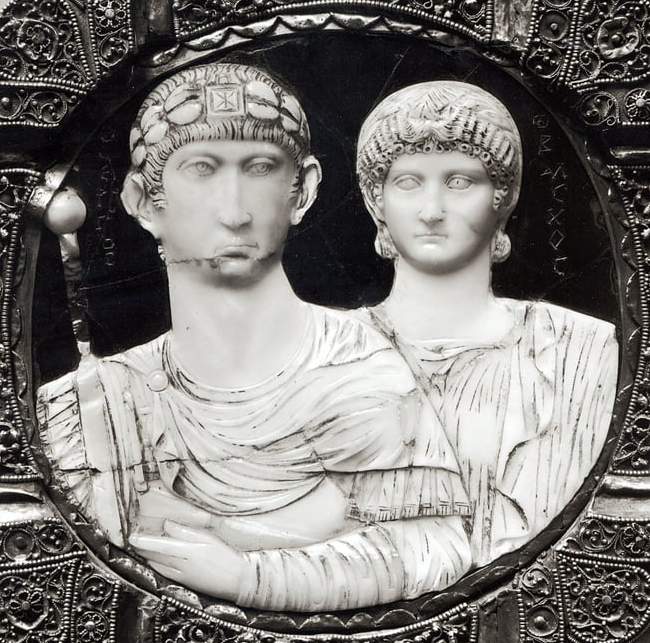
Cameo of Honorius and his wife Maria, probably recarved from an old cameo of Claudius and Agrippina.

Meanwhile, Honorius was at Bononia, on his way from Ravenna to Ticinum, when the news reached him of his brother's death in May 408. He at first was planning to go to Constantinople to help set up the court during the transition from Arcadius to Theodosius II. Summoned from Ravenna for advice, Stilicho advised Honorius not to go, and proceeded to go himself. In Stilicho's absence, a minister named Olympius gained the confidence of Honorius. He convinced the emperor that his father-in-law was conspiring with the barbarians to overthrow him.

On his return to Ravenna, Honorius ordered the arrest and execution of Stilicho. With Stilicho's fall, Honorius moved against all of his former father-in-law's allies, killing and torturing key individuals and ordering the confiscation of the property of anyone who had borne any office while Stilicho was in command. Honorius's wife Thermantia was taken from the imperial throne and given over to her mother; Eucherius, the son of Stilicho, was put to death. The purge also massacred the families of Stilicho's foederati troops, and they defected en masse to Alaric.

In October 408, Alaric returned to Italy to claim more gold and land to settle in, as feudatory vassals of the Empire, which Stilicho had promised him. The city bought him off with 5,000 lbs of gold and 30,000 lbs of silver after a short siege with Rome on the verge of famine.

A palace revolution in Honorius's court led meanwhile to a change of ministers, and those hostile to the Goths were replaced by officers favourable to Alaric, who began peace negotiations. While the embassy was absent, a new change occurred at Ravenna, and Honorius disclaimed the peace which was on the verge of being concluded. The enraged Alaric returned to Rome in late 409 and forced the Senate to elect Priscus Attalus as emperor, who ratified Alaric's former treaty with Stilicho.

=== Sack of Rome ===
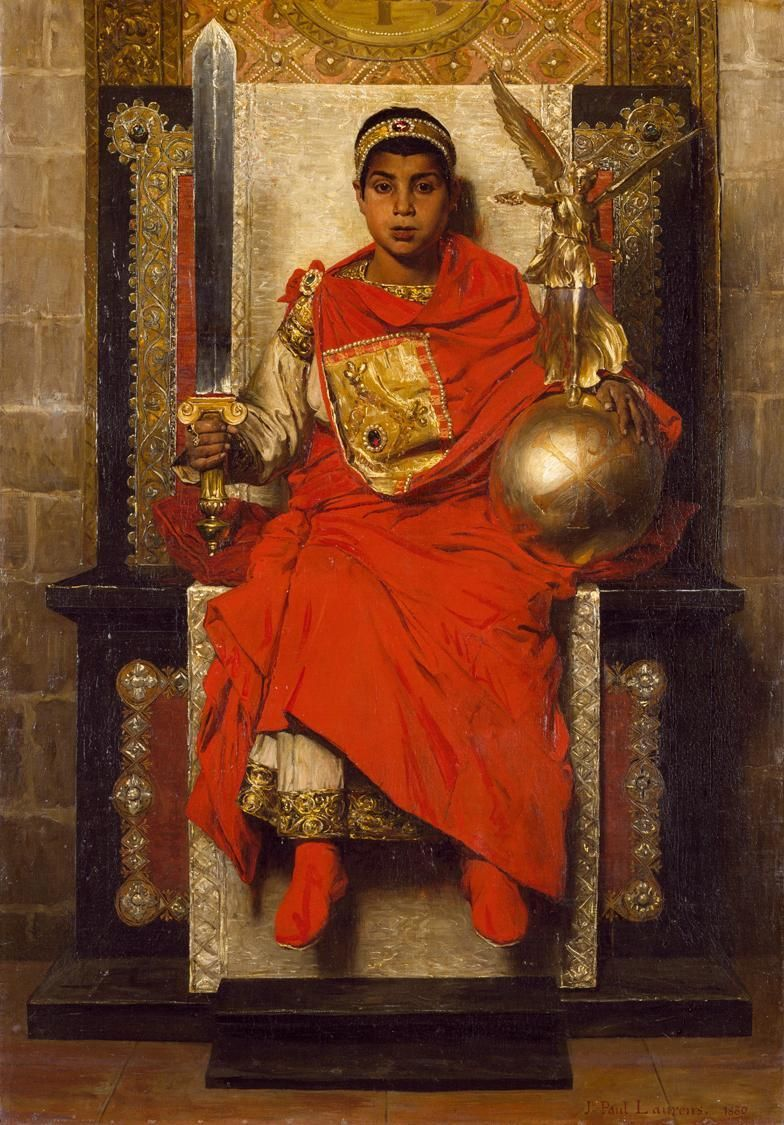
Jean-Paul Laurens - The Byzantine Emperor Honorius - 1880

Rome had been under Visigothic siege since shortly after Stilicho's deposition and execution in the summer of 408. In 410, the Eastern Roman Empire sent six legions (6,000 men; due to changes in tactics, legions of this period were about 1,000 soldiers, down from the 6,000-soldier legions of the Republic era and Empire period up to late 4th century) from Ravenna to aid Honorius, but Alaric ambushed the legions on the way, and only a handful of them reached Rome. Lacking a strong general to control the by-now mostly Germanic Roman army, Honorius could do little to attack Alaric's forces directly, and apparently adopted the only strategy he could in the situation: wait passively for the Visigoths to grow weary and spend the time marshalling what forces he could.

To counter Attalus, Honorius tried to negotiate with Alaric in addition to restricting grain shipments to Rome from North Africa. Attalus dispatched an army to conquer Africa and restore the grain supply to Rome, but the governor, Heraclian, who was loyal to Honorius, wiped out this force as soon as it landed on the coast. As Rome was dependent on North African grain for sustenance, the populace was faced with the prospect of famine, and they blamed Attalus for the impending calamity. Growing desperate, Attalus searched for means of pacifying the people, but found himself, in consequence of conciliatory expenditures, incapable of satisfying his debt to Alaric, and thus alienated both Romans and Goths. Confronted with the increasing unpopularity and truculence of Attalus, Alaric dethroned him in 410 and proposed to renew negotiations with Honorius. Honorius, overconfident at Attalus's fall and the victory of his general Heraclian over Attalus's African expeditionary force, refused negotiation, and declared Alaric the eternal enemy of the Republic.

Stricken by starvation, Rome's defences were opened to Alaric and the Visigoths poured in. The city had not been under the control of a foreign force since an invasion of Gauls some eight centuries before. The sack itself was relatively mild; for example, churches and religious statuary went unharmed. The psychological blow to the contemporary Roman world was considerably more painful. The shock of this event reverberated from Britain to Jerusalem, and inspired Augustine to write his magnum opus, The City of God.

=== Constantius and the beginning of erosion of the Western Empire ===
The revolt of Constantine III in the west continued through this period. In 409, Gerontius, Constantine III's general in Hispania, rebelled against him, proclaimed Maximus Emperor, and besieged Constantine at Arles. Honorius now found himself an able commander, Constantius, who defeated Maximus and Gerontius, and then Constantine, in 411.

Gaul was again a source of troubles for Honorius: just after Constantius's troops had returned to Italy, Jovinus revolted in northern Gaul, with the support of Alans, Burgundians, and the nobility of Gallic descent. Jovinus tried to negotiate with the invading Goths of Ataulf (412), but his proclamation of his brother Sebastianus as Augustus made Ataulf seek alliance with Honorius. Honorius had Ataulf defeat and execute Jovinus in 413. At the same time, Heraclianus raised the standard of revolt in North Africa, but failed during an invasion of Italy. Defeated, he fled back to Carthage and was killed.

In 414, Constantius attacked Ataulf, who proclaimed Priscus Attalus emperor again. Constantius drove Ataulf into Hispania, and Attalus, having again lost Visigoth support, was captured and deposed once again. In the eleventh consulship of Honorius and the second of Constantius, the Emperor entered Rome in triumph, with Attalus at the wheels of his chariot. Honorius punished Attalus by cutting off his right finger and thumb, inflicting the same fate with which Attalus had threatened Honorius. Remembering how Attalus had suggested that Honorius should retire to some small island, he returned the favour by banishing Attalus to the island of Lipara.

Northeastern Gaul became subject to even greater Frankish influence, while a treaty signed in 418 granted to the Visigoths southwestern Gaul, the former Gallia Aquitania. Under the influence of Constantius, Honorius issued the Edict of 418, which was designed to enable the Empire to retain a hold on the lands which were to be surrendered to the Goths. This edict relaxed the administrative bonds that connected all the Seven Provinces (The Maritime Alps, Narbonensis Prima, Narbonensis Secunda, Novempopulania, Aquitania Prima, Aquitania Secunda and Viennensis) with the central government. It removed the imperial governors and allowed the inhabitants, as a dependent federation, to conduct their own affairs, for which purpose representatives of all the towns were to meet every year in Arles.

In 417, Constantius married Honorius's sister, Galla Placidia, against her will. In 421, Honorius recognised him as co-emperor Constantius III; however, when the announcement of his elevation was sent to Constantinople, Theodosius refused to recognise him. Constantius, enraged, began preparations for a military conflict with the eastern empire but before he could commence it, he died in September 421.

In 420–422, another Maximus (or perhaps the same) gained and lost power in Hispania. By the time of Honorius's death in 423, Britain, Spain and Gaul had been ravaged by barbarians. In his final years, Honorius fell out with his sister after his soldiers clashed with hers. Galla Placidia and her children, the future emperor Valentinian III and his sister, Honoria, were forced to flee to Constantinople.

=== Death ===
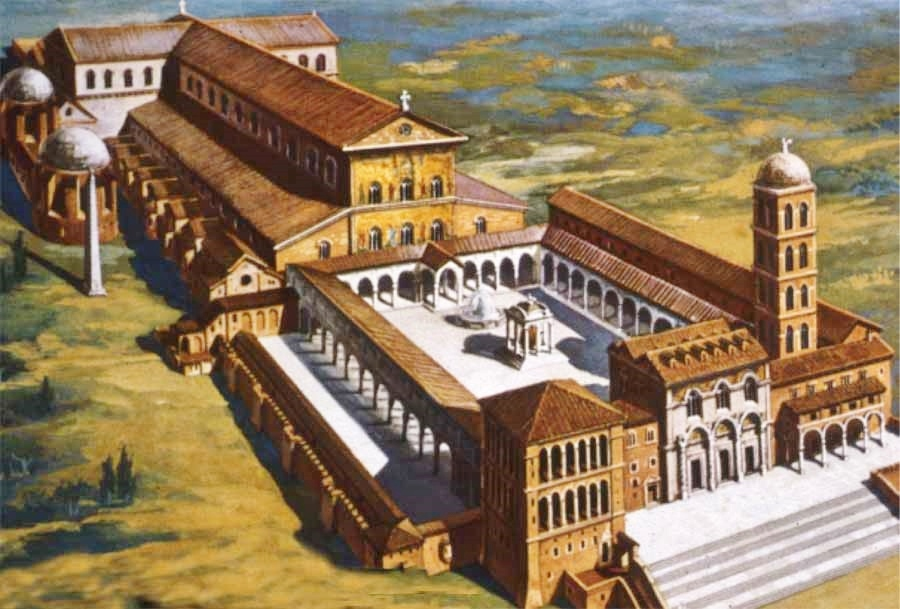
Reconstruction of Old St. Peter's Basilica in Rome. The Mausoleum of Honorius is the domed structure at the extreme top left, behind the rotunda Sant'Andrea and the Vatican obelisk.

Honorius died of edema on 15 August 423, leaving no heir. In the subsequent interregnum Joannes was nominated Emperor. The following year, however, the Eastern Emperor Theodosius II installed his cousin Valentinian III, son of Galla Placidia and Constantius III, as Emperor.

The Mausoleum of Honorius was located on the Vatican Hill, accessed from the transept of the Old Saint Peter's Basilica. It was first used for Maria. Probably Thermantia and Honorius's sister Galla Placidia, and perhaps other imperial family members, were later buried there. In the 8th century it was transformed into a church, the Chapel of St Petronilla, which held the relics of the saint and was demolished when the New St Peter's was erected.

== Assessments ==
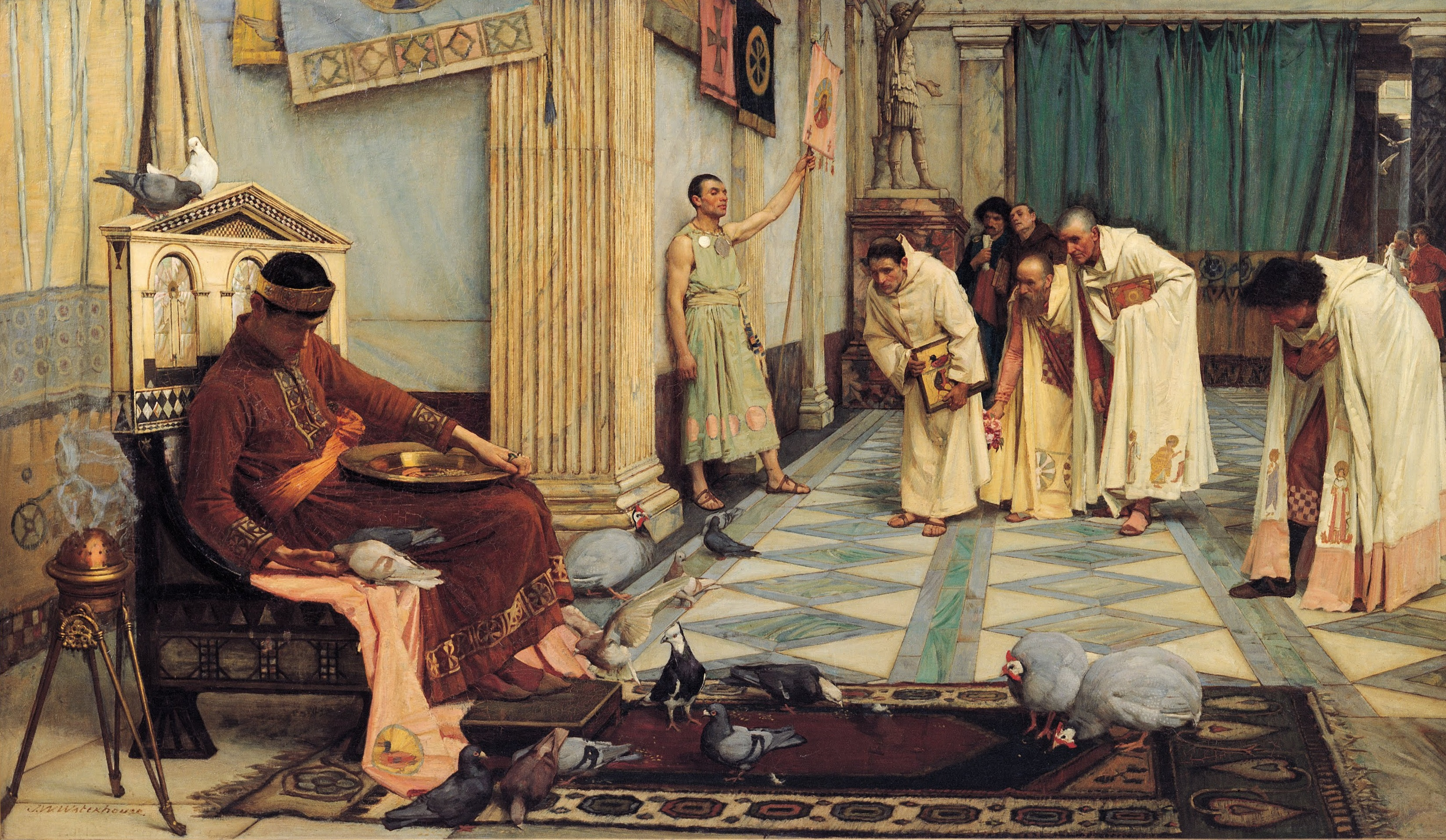
The Favourites of the Emperor Honorius, by John William Waterhouse, 1883

In his History of the Wars, Procopius mentions a likely apocryphal story where, on hearing the news that Rome had "perished", Honorius was initially shocked, thinking the news was in reference to a favourite chicken he had named "Rome".

At that time they say that the Emperor Honorius in Ravenna received the message from one of the eunuchs, evidently a keeper of the poultry, that Rome had perished. And he cried out and said, 'And yet it has just eaten from my hands!' For he had a very large cock, Rome by name; and the eunuch comprehending his words said that it was the city of Rome which had perished at the hands of Alaric, and the emperor with a sigh of relief answered quickly: 'But I thought that my fowl Rome had perished.' So great, they say, was the folly with which this emperor was possessed.
—Procopius, The Vandalic War (III.2.25–26)

While the tale is discounted as a rumour by more recent historians like Edward Gibbon, it is useful in understanding Roman public opinion towards Honorius.

Honorius was negatively assessed by some 19th and 20th century historians, including J.B. Bury.

Honorius issued a decree during his reign, prohibiting men from wearing trousers in Rome. The last known gladiatorial games took place during the reign of Honorius, who banned the practice in 399 and again in 404, reportedly due to the martyrdom of a Christian monk named Telemachus while he was protesting against a gladiator fight.

== See also ==
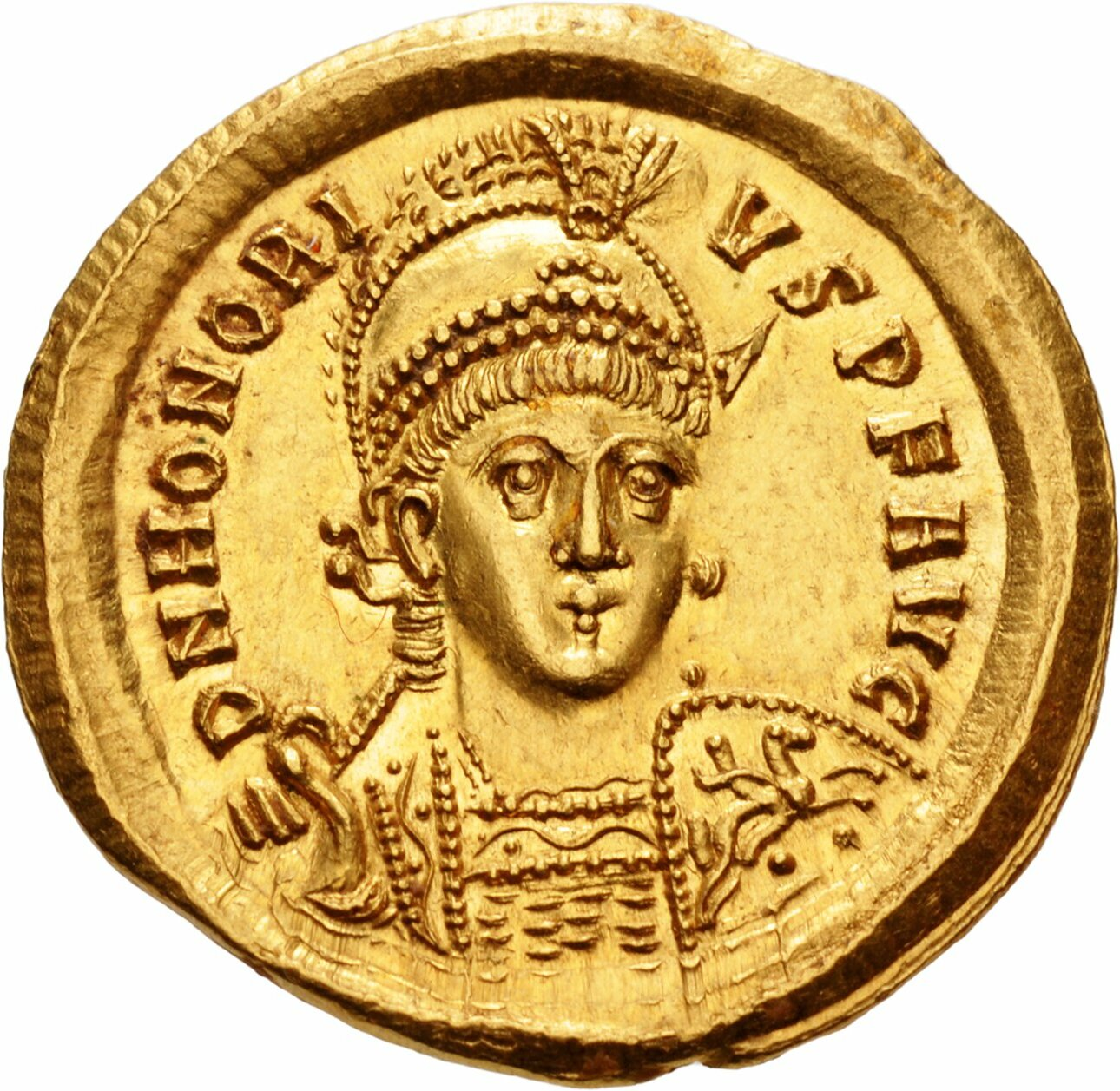
Solidus of Honorius

- Roman Civil war of 407–415:
  - Priscus Attalus in Rome (two times);
  - Maximus in Hispania;
  - Marcus, Gratian, Constantine "III" and Constans "II" in Gaul and Britain;
  - Jovinus and Sebastianus (joint puppets of Gundahar and Goar).
- Co-emperors with Honorius:
  - Constantius III.
- Succession to Honorius:
  - Joannes and Valentinian III.
- Ancient Rome: The Rise and Fall of an Empire

== Sources ==
=== Primary sources ===
- Aurelius Victor, "Epitome de Caesaribus", English version of Epitome de Caesaribus Archived
- Zosimus, "Historia Nova", Books 4–6 Historia Nova

=== Secondary sources ===
- Birley, Anthony Richard (2005). The Roman Government of Britain. Oxford University Press.
- Blockley, R.C. (2003). "The dynasty of Theodosius". In Garnsey, Peter; Cameron, Averil (eds.). The Cambridge Ancient History. Vol. XIII: The Late Empire, A.D. 337-425. Cambridge University Press.
- Doyle, Chris. Honorius: The Fight for the Roman West AD 395-423. Roman Imperial Biographies. Routledge. (2018)
- Doyle, Christopher. The Endgame of Treason: Suppressing Rebellion and Usurpation in the Late Roman Empire AD 397‑411. (2014) National University of Ireland Galway. Unpublished doctoral thesis. https://aran.library.nuigalway.ie/handle/10379/4631
- Elton, Hugh (2018). The Roman Empire in Late Antiquity: A Political and Military History. Cambridge University Press.
- Kovács, Tamás. “410: Honorius, His Rooster, and the Eunuch (Procop. Vand. 1.2.25–26).” Graeco-Latina Brunensia 25, no. 2 (2020): 131–48. https://doi.org/10.5817/GLB2020-2-10.
- Jones, A.H.M. (1964). The Later Roman Empire, 284–602: A Social, Economic, and Administrative Survey [Paperback, vol. 1]. Basil Blackwell Ltd. ISBN 0-8018-3353-1.
- Mathisen, Ralph, "Honorius (395–423 A.D.)", De Imperatoribus Romanis
- McEvoy, Meaghan A. (2010). 'Rome and the transformation of the imperial office in the late fourth - mid-fifth centuries A.D.', Papers of the British School at Rome 78: 151–192.
- McEvoy, Meaghan A. (2013). Child Emperor Rule in the Late Roman West, A.D. 367-455. Oxford Classical Monographs. Oxford University Press. ISBN 978-0-19-966481-8.
- McEvoy, Meaghan A. (2013). 'The mausoleum of Honorius: late Roman imperial Christianity and the city of Rome in the fifth century', in Rosamond McKitterick, John Osbourne, Carol M. Richards, Joanna Story (eds.), Old St Peter's, Rome, Cambridge: Cambridge University Press: 119–136.
- Jones, Arnold Hugh Martin; Martindale, J. R.; Morris, John, eds. (1971). "Fl. Honorius 3". The Prosopography of the Later Roman Empire. Vol. I, AD 260–395. Cambridge University Press. ISBN 9780521072335.
- Bury, John Bagnell (1889). A History of the Later Roman Empire from Arcadius to Irene (395 A.D. to 800 A.D.). Macmillan Publishers.
- Gibbon. Edward Decline & Fall of the Roman Empire (1888)

Regnal titles
Preceded by Theodosius I	Western Roman emperor 395–423 with Constantius III (421)	Succeeded by Joannes
Political offices
Preceded by Arcadius; Bauto	Roman consul 386 with Euodius	Succeeded by Valentinian II; Eutropius
Preceded by Theodosius I Abundatius	Roman consul II; 394 with Arcadius	Succeeded by Anicius Hermogenianus Olybrius; Anicius Probinus
Preceded by Anicius Hermogenianus Olybrius; Anicius Probinus	Roman consul III; 396 with Arcadius	Succeeded by Caesarius; Nonius Atticus
Preceded by Caesarius; Nonius Atticus	Roman consul IV; 398 with Eutychianus	Succeeded by Mallius Theodorus; Eutropius
Preceded by Vincentius; Fravitta	Roman consul V 402 with Arcadius	Succeeded by Theodosius II; Rumoridus
Preceded by Theodosius II; Rumoridus	Roman consul VI; 404 with Aristaenetus	Succeeded by Stilicho; Anthemius
Preceded by Arcadius; Anicius Petronius Probus	Roman consul VII; 407 with Theodosius II	Succeeded by Anicius Auchenius Bassus; Philippus
Preceded by Anicius Auchenius Bassus; Philippus	Roman consul VIII; 409 with Theodosius II	Succeeded by Varanes; Tertullus
Preceded by Theodosius II	Roman consul IX; 412 with Theodosius II	Succeeded by Heraclianus; Lucius
Preceded by Constantius III; Constans	Roman consul X 415 with Theodosius II	Succeeded by Theodosius II; Junius Quartus Palladius
Preceded by Theodosius II; Junius Quartus Palladius	Roman consul XI; 417–418 with Constantius III and Theodosius II	Succeeded by Monaxius; Plinta
Preceded by Agricola; Eustathius	Roman consul XII; 422 with Theodosius II	Succeeded by Avitus Marinianus; Asclepiodotus
