= Eutychianus =

Eutychianus:

- Pope Eutychian (275–283)
- Flavius Eutychianus, Roman consul in 398
- Eutychianus of Adana, 6th century writer
