= Flavius Mallius Theodorus =

Roman senator, scholar and author

Flavius Mallius Theodorus (fl. c. 376–409) was a Roman politician and author of an extant treatise on metres, De metris, one of the best of its kind (H. Keil, Grammatici Latini, vi.). He also studied philosophy, astronomy and geometry, and wrote works on those subjects, which, together with his consulship, formed the subject of a panegyric by Claudian.

== Biography ==
Theodorus' life is known in detail thanks to Claudian's panegyric, Panegyricus dictus Manlio Theodoro consuli.

He came from a family of humble origin, which, nonetheless, allowed him to start an administrative career. Claudian says that Theodorus was member of the court of a Praetorian prefect, as lawyer; historians think this was probably the Praetorian prefect of Italy, and that this office should be dated to 376. He was then governor of an African province, probably around 377, followed by consularis of Macedonia (c. 378).

Next Theodorus entered in the imperial court administration, with an office that historians identify as magister memoriae and date to 379, followed in 380 by the rank of comes sacrarum largitionum or, more probably, of comes rerum privatarum; in this office he received a law preserved in the Codex Theodosianus. He then became Praetorian prefect of Gaul, an office held in c. 382, then took a break for some years.

He allied to Stilicho and from 397 to 399 held the post of Praetorian prefect of Illyricum, Italy and Africa (several laws conserved in the Codex Theodosianus were addressed to him in this period). In 399 he also held the consulate, together with Eutropius, a powerful and hated high officer of the Eastern court, who was killed that same year.

== Augustine and Theodorus ==
Augustine of Hippo knew Theodorus. When he converted to Christianity, Augustine wrote a book, On blessed life, which he dedicated to Theodorus. Theodorus, who at the time had retired from the court, was one of the Christian platonic intellectuals that Augustine met in Milan.

When, in 397, he wrote the Confessions, Augustine had changed his mind on Theodorus, who now was Praetorian prefect of Italy: Augustine described Theodorus as "a man inflated with monstrous pride" and despised his own admiration of him years before.

== Notes ==
Political offices
Preceded by Siburius	Praetorian prefect of Gaul; 382–383	Succeeded by Euodius
Preceded by Eusebius	Praetorian prefect of Italy; 397–399	Succeeded by Valerius Messala Avienus
Preceded by Honorius IV; Eutychianus	Roman consul 399 with Eutropius	Succeeded by Stilicho; Aurelianus
