= Bauto =

4th-century Frankish military officer and imperial advisor in the Roman Empire

Flavius Bauto (died c. 385) was a Romanised Frank who served as a magister militum of the Roman Empire and was a powerful figure in the court of emperor Valentinian II.

== Biography ==
In 381, during the Gothic War (376-382), Bauto was sent by western emperor Gratian with an expeditionary field army to aid the eastern emperor, Theodosius I. As is common, the sources do not explicitly name him a magister militum, but the importance of this mission makes it very likely.

Gratian was defeated and killed in 383 by the usurper Magnus Maximus, who established himself as emperor in Britain and Gaul. Emperor Valentinian II, previously subordinate to his half-brother Gratian, now became the technical senior ruler, although his authority was limited to Italy and he suffered from a reputation for weakness, stemming from his accession to the throne as a child. Thus, powerful ministers like Bauto were able to exert a great deal of control over Valentinian's regime.

For example, Bauto organized the defense of Italy, and was given the prestigious consulship in 385, although he was not the first pick for the position. According to bishop Ambrose, Maximus accused Bauto of attacking him with barbarian troops and intending to use Valentinian II as a puppet emperor to acquire power for himself. In matters of religion, it is unclear whether Bauto was a Greco-Roman polytheist or a Christian. He and Rumoridus, who was definitely a polytheist, were present before Valentinian II when Ambrose successfully convinced the emperor against Quintus Aurelius Symmachus' proposal to restore the pagan Altar of Victory, which had been earlier removed from the Curia Julia. Afterwards, the two men went along with Valentinian II's decision. If Bauto was a polytheist and had supported restoring the Altar, his power must have been limited in some aspects.

He died sometime after 385, with no foul play recorded in the sources. Afterwards, his daughter Aelia Eudoxia resided in the house of a son of Promotus, a nemesis of Rufinus, and later married Emperor Arcadius in 395, becoming one of the more powerful empresses of the period. His military office was succeeded by Arbogastes, who went on to influence Valentinian II and is claimed by John of Antioch to be Bauto's son. (Note: John of Antioch's assertion was rejected in the PLRE, as no other source supports it, but accepted by Cameron.)

== Sources ==
- Cameron, Alan (2010). The Last Pagans of Rome. Oxford University Press. ISBN 978-0-19-974727-6.
- Martindale, John R.; Jones, A. H. M.; Morris, John, eds. (1971). The Prosopography of the Later Roman Empire: Volume I, AD 260–395. Cambridge: Cambridge University Press. ISBN 0-521-07233-6.
- Bendle, Christopher (2024). The Office of "Magister Militum" in the 4th Century CE: A Study into the Impact of Political and Military Leadership on the Later Roman Empire. Franz Steiner Verlag.

Political offices
Preceded by Ricomer; Clearchus	Roman consul 385 with Arcadius	Succeeded by Honorius; Euodius
