= Junius Quartus Palladius =

Roman politician

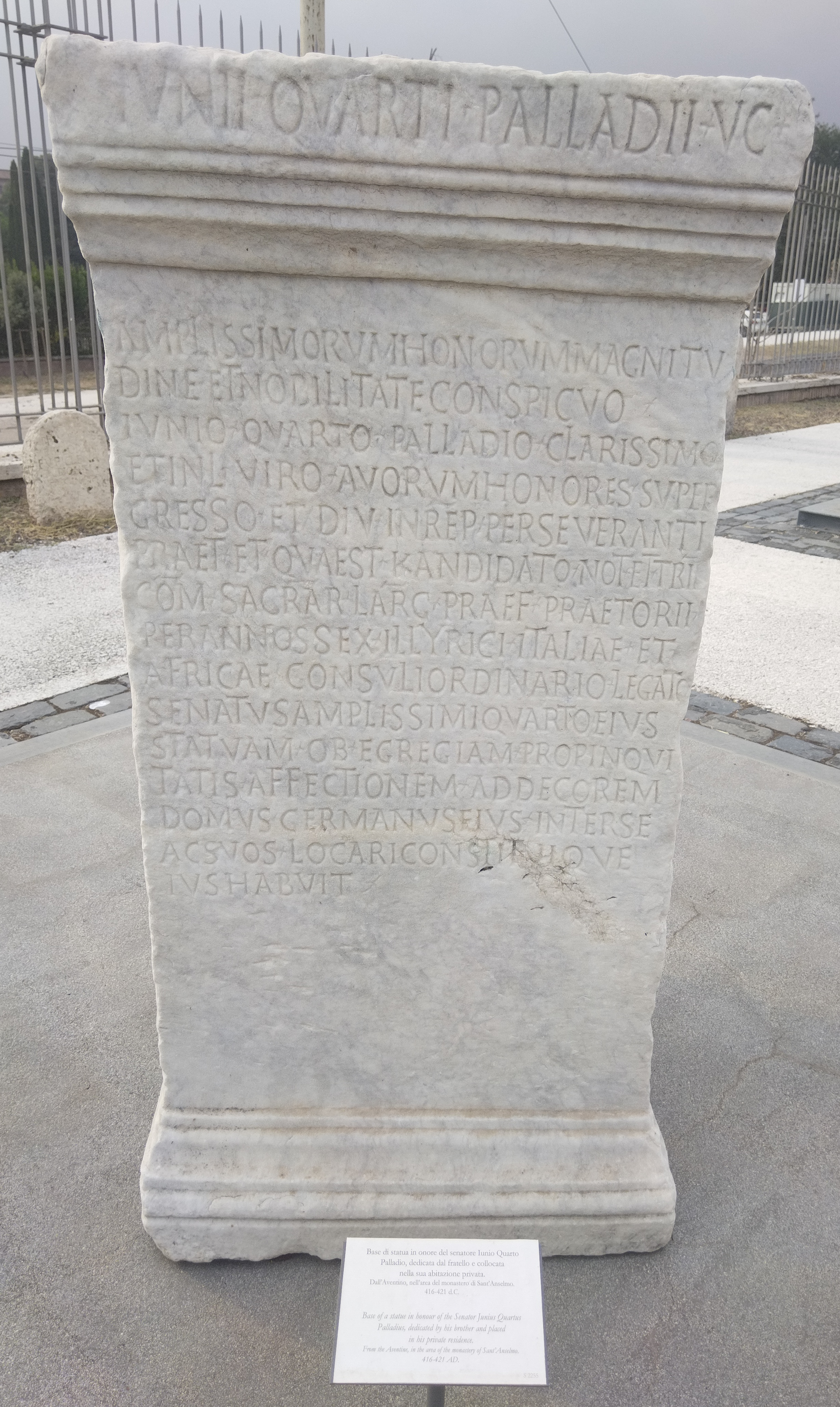
Inscription of statue to Roman consul Iunius Quartus Palladius, currently at the Parco del Celio

Junius Quartus Palladius (fl. 408–421) was a politician of the Western Roman Empire, who held the Praetorian prefecture of Italy, Illyricum and Africa for six years and was also consul in 416.

== Life ==
Palladius came from a noble family, that gave several high officers to the imperial administration. It is known that he had a brother, who set up a statue in his honour near his house on the Aventine Hill; the inscription on the base gives Palladius' career in detail. Early in his career he was quaestor and pretor candidatus, notarius et tribunus at the Imperial court, and comes sacrarum largitionum (probably in 408/409, if he is to be identified with the Palladius that was in Rome at the time of Alaric's first siege).

In 416 Palladius was appointed consul, at the same time as the Eastern emperor Theodosius II held the same position in Constantinople. On January 7, 416, he also assumed office as Praetorian prefect of Italy, Illyricum and Africa, which he held for six years (at least until July 28, 421, but his first possible successor is attested only in 422). On April 30, 418, he received a law from Honorius, directing him to expel the Pelagians from Rome; later he and the other prefects (Monaxius and Agricola) issued a praetorian law against the Pelagians.

He is probably to be identified with the tribunus et notarius who was in Rome in 408, during the first siege of Alaric. In this occasion Palladius was to gather from the Roman aristocrats the jewels needed to pay for Alaric's tribute, but he could not obtain enough and was obliged to proceed to despoil the residual decorations of the Pagan temples of the city.

On four occasions he was appointed envoy by the Roman Senate.

== Sources ==
- Martindale, John R., ed. (1980). "Fl. Iunius Quartus Palladius 19". The Prosopography of the Later Roman Empire: Volume II, AD 395–527. Cambridge: Cambridge University Press. pp. 822–824. ISBN 0-521-20159-4.

Political offices
Preceded by Honorius Augustus X Theodosius Augustus VI	Roman consul 416; With: Theodosius Augustus VII	Succeeded by Honorius Augustus XI; Constantius II
Preceded by Seleucus	Praetorian prefect of Italy; 416–421	Succeeded by Anicius Auchenius Bassus
