= Aristaenetus (consul) =

Aristaenetus (Greek: Άρισταίνετος; c. AD 365 – after AD 404) was a Roman politician who was appointed consul in AD 404 alongside the western emperor Honorius.

== Biography ==
Aristaenetus was the son of Bassianus (a notarius in the eastern court around the year 371) and Prisca. Both his paternal grandfather Thalassius and his maternal grandfather Helpidius had been praetorian prefects of the East. Possibly a pagan, he was related to the rhetorician Libanius, under whom Aristaenetus was a pupil.

Aristaenetus was a supporter of Flavius Rufinus, and through his influence Aristaenetus was made praefectus urbi of Constantinople in the second half of AD 392. He also visited Antioch for some purpose in AD 393. In AD 404, he was made consul posterior in the East alongside the emperor Honorius, although his position was not recognized in the West by the power behind the western court, the magister utriusque militiae, Stilicho.

== Sources ==
- Martindale, John R.; Jones, A. H. M.; Morris, John, eds. (1971). The Prosopography of the Later Roman Empire: Volume I, AD 260–395. Cambridge: Cambridge University Press. ISBN 0-521-07233-6.

Political offices
Preceded by Flavius Theodosius Augustus, Flavius Rumoridus	Consul of the Roman Empire; 404 with Flavius Honorius Augustus VI	Succeeded by Flavius Stilicho II, Flavius Anthemius
