= Eutropius (consul 399) =

Chamberlain at the Eastern Roman imperial court and consul in 399 AD

Eutropius (Greek: Εὐτρόπιος; died 399) was a fourth-century Eastern Roman official who rose to prominence during the reign of emperor Arcadius. He was the first eunuch to become a consul in the Roman Empire.

== Career ==
Eutropius was born in one of the Roman provinces of the Middle East, either Assyria or on the border of Armenia. According to Honorius' court poet Claudian, who composed a satirical invective against Eutropius due to the latter's hostility to Claudian's patron, Stilicho, Eutropius served successively as a catamite, pimp, and body-servant to various Roman soldiers and nobles, before winding up among the domestic eunuchs of the imperial palace.

He rose to the rank of palace chamberlain, or the praepositus sacri cubiculi. After Theodosius' death in 395 he stood at the head of a faction opposed to the powerful Praetorian Prefect of the east, Rufinus. He successfully arranged the marriage of the new emperor, Arcadius, to Aelia Eudoxia, the daughter of general Bauto having blocked an attempt by Arcadius' chief minister to increase his power by marrying the young and weak-willed emperor to his daughter.

After Rufinus' assassination in 395, Eutropius rose in importance in the imperial court, and he soon became Arcadius' closest advisor. He also played a role in the Revolt of Alaric I and the Gildonic War by encouraging Gildo's revolt against Stilicho's machinations. Eutropius' ascension to power was assisted by his defeat of a Hun invasion in 398. Around this time, Eutropius got John Chrysostom appointed as the bishop of Constantinople.

In 399, he became the first eunuch to be appointed a consul.

== Downfall and execution ==
During his rise to the consulship, Eutropius earned a notoriety for cruelty and greed. He may also have played a role in the assassination of his predecessor Rufinus. In 399, the year of his consulship, he sent Gaïnas, the magister militum at the time, to quell Tribigild's rebellion. However, Gainas and Tribigild teamed up to persuade Arcadius to dismiss Eutropius. In the meantime, Eutropius had also been estranged from Eudoxia, the very empress he had installed, who appeared to her husband wailing with her infant daughters about the eunuch's alleged schemes against her. Moved by his subordinates' threats and compassion for his family, Arcadius exiled Eutropius.

After Eutropius's fall from power, his ally John Chrysostom's pleas kept him alive for a short time. He was eventually executed before the year ended. A surviving imperial edict shows that he was subjected to damnatio memoriae and his property was confiscated.

== Notes ==
Political offices
Preceded by Honorius Augustus IV; Flavius Eutychianus	Consul of the Roman Empire; 399 with Flavius Mallius Theodorus	Succeeded by Aurelianus; Flavius Stilicho I
