= Rumoridus =

Roman army officer

Flavius Rumoridus (died 5th century AD) was a Roman soldier who was appointed consul in AD 403 in the Western Roman Empire. At the same time, the eastern emperor Theodosius II served in the same capacity in the East.

== Biography ==
Rumoridus was of Germanic origin, and had not converted to Christianity. Ambrose, bishop of Milan, described Rumoridus in a letter to Eugenius as maintaining the practice of ethnic religions from earliest childhood. He began his service as a career military officer, and may have been posted at some point in the Diocese of Thrace. He was eventually appointed a magister militum under Valentinian II in AD 384, was present during the debate regarding the restoration of the Altar of Victory in the Curia Julia. However, he agreed with Valentinian's eventual order to reject the reinstatement of the altar.

Although he was probably an old man, in AD 403 Rumoridus was made consul in the West at the same time as the infant Theodosius II in the East. It has been suggested by Martindale et. al. that he was recalled to military service as a result of the crisis precipitated by the invasion of Italy by Alaric and the Visigoths in AD 402, and may have played a part in Alaric's defeat and retreat from Italy in AD 403. His consulship is recorded in several inscriptions, with considerable variety in the spelling of his name.

== Sources ==
- Martindale, John R.; Jones, A. H. M.; Morris, John, eds. (1971). The Prosopography of the Later Roman Empire: Volume I, AD 260–395. Cambridge: Cambridge University Press. ISBN 0-521-07233-6.

Political offices
Preceded by Arcadius V Honorius V	Roman consul 403 with Theodosius Augustus	Succeeded by Honorius VI; Aristaenetus
