= Euodius =

Roman politician

Flavius Euodius (fl. 4th century) was a Roman politician and military officer, who was appointed consul in AD 386 alongside Honorius, the infant son of the emperor Theodosius I.

== Biography ==
An acquaintance of Martin of Tours, Euodius was the Praetorian Prefect in Gaul from AD 385 to 386, under the emperor in the west, Magnus Maximus. During his time as prefect, he put the heretic Priscillian on trial, and found him guilty of practicing magic. In AD 386 he was appointed consul posterior together with the two-year-old Honorius. Despite the tensions between the emperors Maximus and Theodosius I, his consulship was recognized in the east.

== Sources ==
- Martindale, John R.; Jones, A. H. M.; Morris, John, eds. (1971). The Prosopography of the Later Roman Empire: Volume I, AD 260–395. Cambridge: Cambridge University Press. ISBN 0-521-07233-6.

Political offices
Preceded by Arcadius; Bauto	Roman consul 386 with Honorius	Succeeded by Valentinian; Eutropius
