= Siburius =

Siburius (fl. 370s), for whom only the single name survives, was a high-ranking official of the Roman Empire. He was one of several Gauls who rose to political prominence in the late 4th century as a result of the emperor Gratian's appointment of his Bordelaise tutor Ausonius to high office.

== Life and career ==
Like Ausonius, Siburius came from Bordeaux. The medical writer Marcellus, their countryman, places Siburius in the company of the historian Eutropius and Julius Ausonius, father of the political scholar-poet, as peers with a literary expertise in medicine.

In early 376, Siburius was magister officiorum under Gratian. He succeeded Ausonius as praefectus praetorio Galliarum (praetorian prefect of Gaul) sometime before December 3, 379, and held the office until 382, when he was succeeded by Mallius Theodorus.

Other scanty evidence of Siburius's life comes from the correspondence of the Antiochan scholar Libanius, who has one letter addressed to him and two to his son, who had the same name. Libanius also mentions Siburius once elsewhere. The son was proconsul of Palaestina Prima around 390.

== Culture and religion ==
Siburius is the addressee of three letters among the correspondence of Quintus Aurelius Symmachus, the advocate of religious tolerance who attempted to preserve the traditional religions of Rome at a time when Christianity had become dominant. Symmachus teases Siburius about his archaic writing style (ἀρχαϊσμὸν scribendi):

If you're so in love with the old days, let's return with an equal amount of attention to the time-honored words in which the Salian priests chanted and the augurs pronounced on a bird-omen and the Commission of Ten established the legal code.

In the assessment of commentator Andrea Pellizzari, Siburius was indeed "un uomo di grande cultura," a highly cultured person.

Siburius's son still practiced the traditional religions of antiquity; Libanius refers to his Hellenism. If the father, as seems likely from Symmachus's remarks, also had not converted, Siburius would have been the first non-Christian to hold the prefecture of Gaul since the death of the emperor Julian, and the last to hold the office.

== Bibliography ==
- Förster, Richard. Libanii Opera. Leipzig: Teubner, 1903–27, vol. 11. Teubner edition with critical apparatus. A volume of the Greek text of the abundant letters of Libanius, teacher and friend to the emperor Julian, including the letters relevant to Siburius.
- Jones, A.H.M. “Collegiate Prefectures.” Journal of Roman Studies 54 (1964) 78–89. Clarifying political succession among the praefecti mainly in the 4th century, with tables.
- Matthews, John. Western Aristocracies and Imperial Court, A.D. 364–425. Oxford University Press, 1975. ISBN 0-19-814499-7 See pp. 72–74 for Siburius.
- McGeachy, J.A., Jr. “The Editing of the Letters of Symmachus.” Classical Philology 44 (1949) 222–229. Argues against the view that the letters of Symmachus had been edited and "watered down" for a Christian readership, and demonstrates that in his friends and correspondents (among them Siburius) Symmachus embraced both Christians and those who practiced the traditional religions.
- Pellizzari, Andrea. Commento storico al libro III dell'Epistolario di Q. Aurelio Simmaco: introduzione, commento storico, testo, traduzione, indici. Pisa: Istituti editoriali e poligrafici internazionali, 1998. Latin text with Italian translation of the third of book of Symmachus's letters; see for extensive commentary (in Italian) on the three to Siburius.
- Seeck, Otto. Monumenta Germaniae historica inde ab anno Christi quingentesimo usque ad annum millesimum et quingentesimum: Q. Aurelii Symmachi quae supersunt. Auctores antiquissimi, vol. 6, pt. 1. Munich: Monumenta Germaniae Historica, 1984. Latin text of Symmachus's letters, with commentary also in Latin.
- Sivan, Hagith. Ausonius of Bordeaux: Genesis of a Gallic Aristocracy. London: Routledge, 1993. For background to Siburius's career and life, with passing references to him.

Preceded by Ausonius	Praetorian prefect of Gaul; 378–382	Succeeded by Mallius Theodorus
