= Nonius Atticus =

Roman politician

Nonius Atticus (floruit 383 – 397) was a politician of the Roman Empire.

== Life ==
Nonius belonged to the senatorial aristocracy, and was a Christian, even if he was a friend of Quintus Aurelius Symmachus.

He was Praetorian prefect of Italy between 383 and 384 and then Consul in 397. In 383 Emperor Gratian died, and his half-brother Valentinian II become the only Emperor. He then decided for a change among the high officers, who had served under Gratian, with new men, more loyal to him. Atticus then succeeded the praetorian prefect Sextus Claudius Petronius Probus, but one year later he was succeeded by Vettius Agorius Praetextatus, and his office was called an "interregnum".

== Bibliography ==
- Maijastina Kahlos, Vettius Agorius Praetextatus - Senatorial Life in Between. Acta Instituti Romani Finlandiae, nr. 26, Rome 2002.

Political offices
Preceded by Arcadius, Honorius	Consul of the Roman Empire; 397 with Caesarius	Succeeded by Honorius, Eutychianus
Preceded by Sextus Claudius Petronius Probus (II)	Praetorian prefect of Italy; 383–384	Succeeded by Vettius Agorius Praetextatus
