= Dorotheus of Antioch =

Dorotheus (Greek: Δωρόθεος) was Arian Archbishop of Constantinople from c. 388 until his death in 407. Preceding his elevation to the see of Constantinople, Dorotheus had served as Arian bishop of Antioch, having succeeded Euzoius of Antioch in 376.

Dorotheus' accession to the episcopal throne in Constantinople marked a period of turmoil within the Arian community of the metropolis. Dorotheus displaced the previous Archbishop, Marinus of Thrace, leading to a division of the community.

Arian Christianity titles
Preceded by Marinus of Thrace	Arian Archbishop of Constantinople c. 388 – 407	Succeeded by Barbas of Constantinople
