= Barbas of Constantinople =

Barbas of Constantinople (died 430) was Arian Archbishop of Constantinople from 407 until his death in 430.

Arian Christianity titles
Preceded by Dorotheus of Antioch	Arian Archbishop of Constantinople; 407–430	Succeeded by Sabbatius of Constantinople
