= Aurelianus (consul 400) =

Roman politician

Aurelianus (Greek: Αύρηλιανός, fl. 393–416) was a prominent politician of the Eastern Roman Empire. He was praefectus urbi of Constantinople from 393 to 394, Praetorian prefect of the East from 399 to 400, and consul in 400. In 400, Gothic rebels under Gainas forced the emperor Arcadius to give them Aurelianus, and he was exiled; he returned to Constantinople after the defeat of the Goths later that year. He served as Pretorian Prefect to the East a second time from 414 to 416.

== Biography ==
Aurelianus was the son of the consul of 361, Taurus, and brother of Caesarius; he had a son called Taurus, Consul in 428. Aurelianus would become a well known and major Christian advocate later in life, and erected a church to protomartyr Stephen.

Aurelianus was praefectus urbi of Constantinople between 393 and 394. When the Gothic magister militum Gainas rose to power at the court of Emperor Arcadius, he had all supporters of his enemy Eutropius removed; he chose Aurelianus as Praetorian prefect of the East (August 399), replacing Eutychianus, Eutropius' choice. Aurelianus, therefore, became the most powerful civilian official and was involved in the trial against Eutropius, which started at Chalcedon in September of that year and culminated in the latter's execution. He was appointed consul for the year 400, but his colleague in the West, the magister militum Stilicho, did not recognize him in an act of open confrontation with the Eastern court and particularly with Gainas. He was still Prefect at the beginning of 400, when he received the order to confiscate the properties of Eutropius and destroy his statues.

In mid-April 400, Gainas, who had rebelled with his Goths, went to Constantinople, where he forced Arcadius to hand over Aurelianus and Saturninus; Aurelianus was exiled (and possibly deposed), but his properties were not confiscated. After the defeat of the Goths at Constantinople (12 July 400), Aurelianus made a triumphant return to the capital. It is known from the laws sent to him and preserved in the Theodosian Code that he was Praetorian prefect of the East a second time between 414 and 416.

He was an important figure in the Senate until late in life and the Senate dedicated him a statue in gold.

== Aurelianus in literature ==
The character of Osiris in the work Aegyptus sive de providentia by Synesius of Cyrene has been identified with Aurelianus; in this work Osiris is opposed to Typhon, representing Caesarius or Eutychianus, while Horus should represent Taurus.

== Notes ==
Political offices
Preceded by Mallius Theodorus; Eutropius	Roman consul 400 with Stilicho	Succeeded by Vincentius; Fravitta
Preceded by Eutychianus	Praetorian prefect of the East; 399	Succeeded by Eutychianus
Preceded by Monaxius	Praetorian prefect of the East; 414–416	Succeeded by Monaxius
