= Caesarius (consul) =

Politician of the Eastern Roman Empire

Flavius Caesarius (Greek: Καισάριος; floruit 386–403) was a politician of the Eastern Roman Empire, who served under the emperors Theodosius I and Arcadius. Caesarius was magister officiorum (386–387), praetorian prefect of the East (395-397 and 400–403), and consul in 397.

== Biography ==
Caesarius was the son of the Consul of 361, Taurus, and the elder brother of Aurelianus, with whom he contended for power. His devotion to his wife is noted by Sozomen.

In 386 he is attested as magister officiorum. As such, he was sent by Emperor Theodosius I to Antioch in 387, where the population had revolted against taxation. Caesarius, together with Ellobicus, then magister militum per Orientem, held an inquiry. Caesarius paid particular attention for the situation of the citizens of Antioch and in his report to the Emperor pleaded for clemency for them. The Antiochian orator Libanius thanked him in an oration for this.

Despite his merits, Caesarius was not appointed to higher offices in the following years, when Rufinus was in power as magister officiorum and praetorian prefect of the East. It is possible that Caesarius, despite being Orthodox, was not strict enough against heretics. Meanwhile, his younger brother Aurelianus made career, succeeding Rufinus as magister officiorum in 392 and then holding the office of praefectus urbi of Constantinople between 393 and 394.

After Rufinus had been killed in November 395, Caesarius succeeded him as praetorian prefect of the East. As such, he nullified several laws Rufinus had passed, including a ban of Lycians from Constantinople - Rufinus's enemies, Eutolmius Tatianus and Proculus had been Lycians - and the prohibition against Arian Eunomians from making wills. However, Caesarius did not act out of opposition to Rufinus, as is shown by the fact that he also issued a law that prevented the widows of proscribed men from losing their properties (the widow of Rufinus probably benefited by this law).

In April 400, Gainas returned to Constantinople with his army, and asked Emperor Arcadius to depose and hand him Aurelianus and Saturninus. Gainas chose Caesarius as successor to Aurelianus to the office of Praetorian prefect of the East, but, after a short time, he left Constantinople and was defeated by the magister militum per Orientem Fravitta. However, Caesarius kept his office until 403. To this period is to be dated an inscription in Tralles, in which Caesarius is attested Patricius, a title that, combined with Praetorian prefecture of the East and his status as a former consul, put Caesarius at the top of the dignities.

Caesarius bought a monastery from the followers of Macedonius. The property had been left as legacy to the monks by Eusebia, a close friend of Caesarius' wife, who had asked them to bury the relics of the Forty Martyrs of Sebaste she kept in her house. Caesarius demolished the monastery and buried his wife and her friend, then built a shrine to Saint Thyrsus, and a tomb for himself close by.

== In literature ==
Caesarius has been identified by some scholars with the character of Typhon of the Aegyptus, sive De providentia by Synesius, where the story of the struggle between the Egyptian god Osiris and Typhon is used to retell the story of the struggle between Aurelianus (Osiris) and Caesarius in the period of the revolt of Gainas. In the novel, Typhon-Caesarius plays the role of the villain, Osiris-Aurelius the main character.

Apart from its literary merits, the De providentia has been useful in reconstructing the events of that period, even if historians need to recast the allegories to real people and historical events and to remove Synesius' bias in favour of Aurelianus.

Political offices
Preceded by Arcadius and Honorius	Consul of the Roman Empire; 397 with Nonius Atticus	Succeeded by Honorius and Eutychianus
Preceded by Rufinus	Praetorian prefect of the East; 395, November 30 – 397, July 13	Succeeded by Eutychianus (I)
Preceded by Eutychianus (II)	Praetorian prefect of the East; 400–403	Succeeded by Eutychianus (III)
