= Marinus of Thrace =

Marinus of Thrace (Greek: Μαρῖνος) (floruit c. 385 until 420–423 at latest) was briefly undisputed Arian Archbishop of Constantinople after the death of bishop Demophilus around 386. He was, however, displaced by Dorotheus of Antioch around 387 or 388. When Dorotheus arrived from Syria, he was immediately installed as the new archbishop, having been considered by his sect to be better qualified for the office than Marinus. It was also cited that the sect has been unhappy with Marinus' deposition, particularly as he represented the views of his party, which became associated with the positions taken by Selenas bishop of the Goths. A key difference, for instance, was the manner by which Dorotheus denied the eternal fatherhood of God while Marinus asserted it.

Thenceforth Marinus withdrew from communion with those Arians who followed Dorotheus and, with a group of followers who grew numerous enough to be considered a distinct sect of Arians, maintained a rival network of churches and oratories. The sect held, in contrast to the Arians under Dorotheus, that 'the Father had always been the Father, even when the son was not.' Those who sided with Dorotheus remained in possession of their churches while those who sided with Marinus had to build new ones. This sect became known as the Psathyrians, which included Theoctistus - one of its most prominent champions - who was by profession a cake-seller (ψαθυροπώλης). The schism between the sects would be healed by the former consul Plinta during the reign of Theodosius II.

Arian Christianity titles
| Preceded by Demophilus of Constantinople | Arian Archbishop of Constantinople; 386–c. 388 | Succeeded by Dorotheus of Antioch |
