= Arcadius =

Roman emperor from 383 to 408

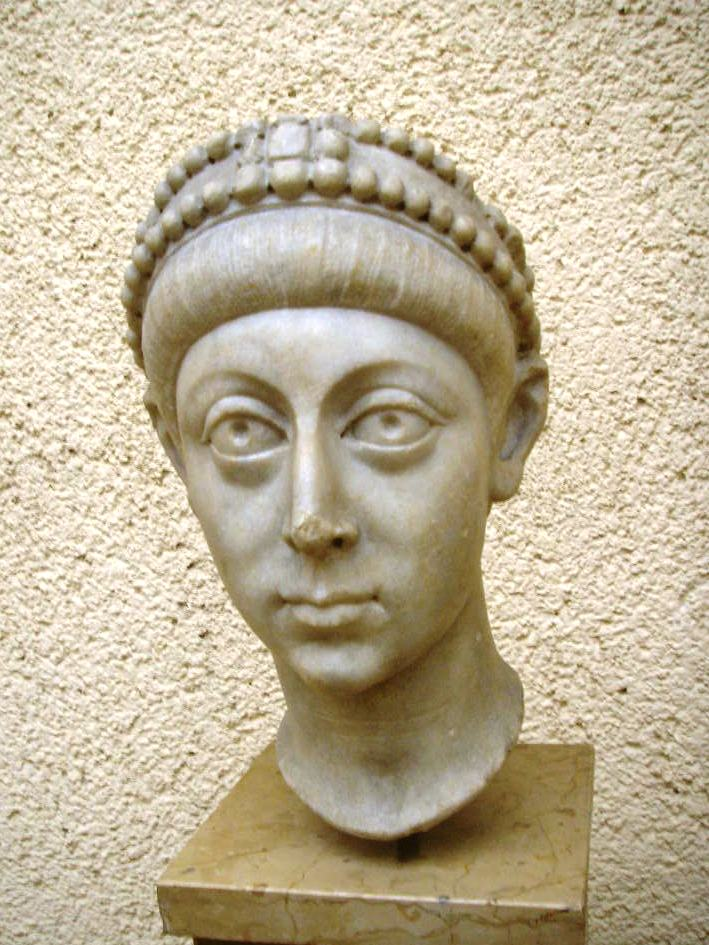
- Bust of an emperor at the Istanbul Archaeology Museum, most likely Arcadius.

Roman emperor of the East
- Augustus: 19 January 383 – 1 May 408 (senior from 17 January 395)
- Predecessor: Theodosius I
- Successor: Theodosius II
- Co-rulers: Theodosius I (383–395); Honorius (West, 393–408); Theodosius II (402–408)
- Born: c. 377; Hispania
- Died: 1 May 408 (aged c. 31); Constantinople
- Burial: Church of the Holy Apostles, Constantinople (now Istanbul, Turkey)
- Spouse: Aelia Eudoxia
- Issue: Flacilla; Pulcheria; Arcadia; Theodosius II; Marina
Regnal name
- Imperator Caesar Flavius Arcadius Augustus
- Dynasty: Theodosian
- Father: Theodosius I
- Mother: Aelia Flaccilla
- Religion: Nicene Christianity

Arcadius (Latin: Arcadius, Ancient Greek: Ἀρκάδιος Arkadios; c. 377 – 1 May 408) was Roman emperor from 383 to his death in 408. He was the eldest son of the Augustus Theodosius I (r. 379–395) and his first wife Aelia Flaccilla, and the brother of Honorius (r. 393–423). Arcadius ruled the eastern half of the empire from 395, when his father died, while Honorius ruled the west. In his time, he was seen as a weak ruler dominated by a series of powerful ministers and by his wife, Aelia Eudoxia.

== Early life ==
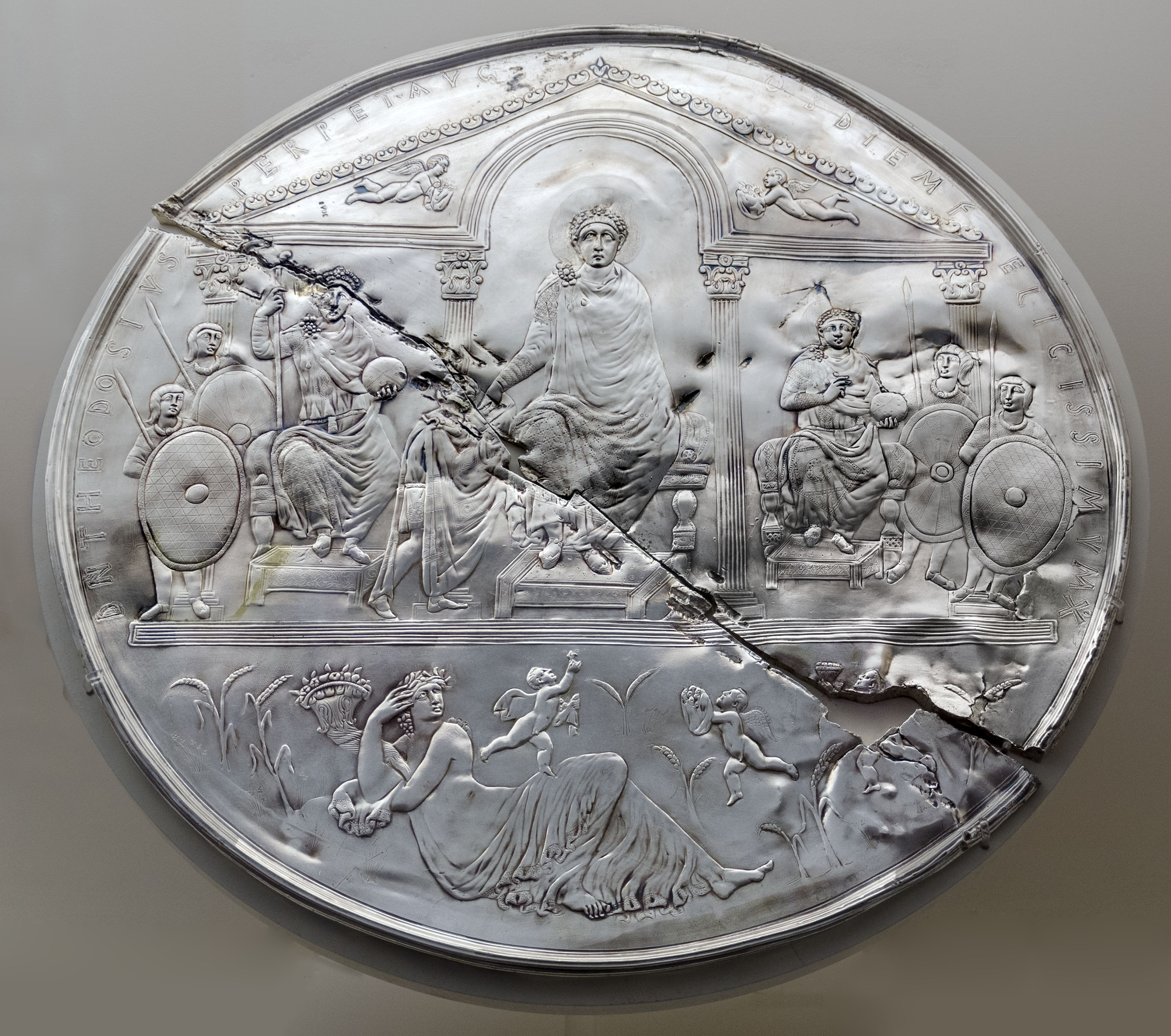
A young Arcadius is depicted on the right of the Missorium of Theodosius. C. 388 AD.

Arcadius was born in 377 in Hispania, the eldest son of Theodosius I and Aelia Flaccilla, and brother of Honorius. On 19 January 383, his father declared the five-year-old Arcadius an Augustus and co-ruler for the eastern half of the Empire. Ten years later a corresponding declaration made Honorius the Augustus of the western half. Arcadius passed his early years under the tutelage of the rhetorician Themistius and Arsenius Zonaras, a monk.

== Reign ==
=== Early reign ===
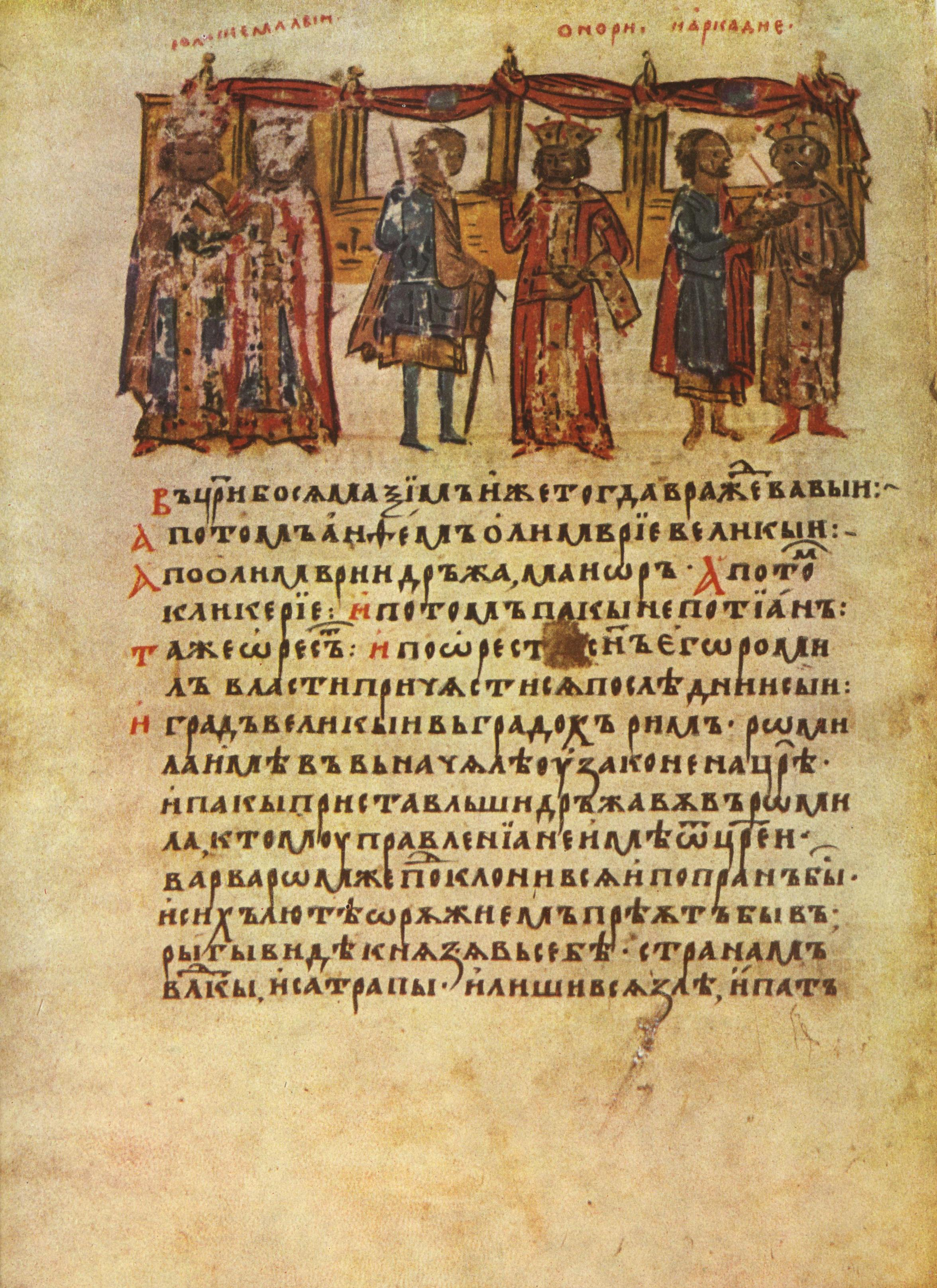
The emperors Arcadius, Honorius and Theodosius I depicted in the 12th century Manasses Chronicle.

Both of Theodosius's sons were young and inexperienced, susceptible to being dominated by ambitious subordinates. In 394 Arcadius briefly exercised independent power with the help of his advisors in Constantinople, when his father Theodosius went west to fight Arbogastes and Eugenius. Theodosius died on 17 January 395, and Arcadius, still aged only 17, fell under the influence of the praetorian prefect of the East, Rufinus. Honorius, aged 10, was consigned to the guardianship of the magister militum Stilicho. Rufinus ambitiously sought to marry his daughter to Arcadius and thereby gain the prestige of being the emperor's father-in-law. However, when the prefect was called away to business in Antioch (where according to Zosimus, Rufinus had Lucianus, the comes orientis, flogged to death with whips loaded with lead), Arcadius was shown a painting of Aelia Eudoxia, the daughter of the deceased Frankish magister militum per orientem, Bauto. Seeing the young emperor's interest in Eudoxia, Eutropius, the eunuch praepositus sacri cubiculi, arranged for the two to meet. Arcadius fell in love and a marriage was quickly arranged, with the ceremony performed on 27 April 395. According to Zosimus, Rufinus assumed that his daughter was still to be the bride, only discovering otherwise when the nuptial procession went to Eudoxia's residence rather than his own. The rise of Eudoxia, facilitated by a general who was a rival of Rufinus, demonstrates the shifting of the centres of power in the eastern court. Such jostling for influence over the malleable emperor would be a recurring feature of Arcadius's reign.

==== Revolt of Alaric I ====
The first crisis facing the young Arcadius was the Gothic revolt in 395, under the command of Alaric I (r. 395–410), who sought to take advantage of the accession of two inexperienced Roman emperors. As Alaric marched towards Constantinople, plundering Macedonia and Thrace, the eastern court could offer no response, as the majority of its army had gone to Italy with Theodosius and was now in the hands of Stilicho. Perhaps sensing an opportunity to exercise power in the eastern half of the empire as well, Stilicho declared that Theodosius had made him guardian over both his sons. He traveled eastward, ostensibly to face Alaric, leading both his own forces and the Gothic mercenaries whom Theodosius had taken west in the civil war with Eugenius. Arcadius and Rufinus felt more threatened by Stilicho than by Alaric; upon landing in Thessaly Stilicho received an imperial order to send along the eastern regiments, but himself to proceed no further. Stilicho complied, falling back to Salona while Gainas led the mercenaries to Constantinople. Arcadius and his entourage received Gainas in the Campus Martius, a parade ground adjacent to the city, on 27 November 395. There Rufinus was suddenly assassinated by the Goths, on the orders of Stilicho and possibly with the support of Eutropius. The murder certainly created an opportunity for Eutropius and for Arcadius's wife, Eudoxia, who took Rufinus's place as advisors and guardians of the emperor.

While Eutropius consolidated his hold on power in the capital, the distracted government still failed to react to the presence of Alaric in Greece. At first Eutropius may have coordinated with Stilicho around the defence of Illyricum; by 397, when Stilicho personally led a blockade that compelled Alaric to retreat into Epirus, the atmosphere of the eastern court had changed. As neither Arcadius nor Eutropius was keen to have Stilicho intervening in the affairs of the eastern empire, they provided no further military aid to Stilicho, who then abandoned the blockade of the Visigoths. At Eutropius's urging, Arcadius declared Stilicho to be a hostis publicus, and came to an arrangement with Alaric, making him magister militum per Illyricum. At around the same time, the eastern court persuaded Gildo, the magister utriusque militiae per Africam, to transfer his allegiance from Honorius to Arcadius, causing relations between the two imperial courts to deteriorate further.

Eutropius's influence lasted four years, during which time he sought to marginalise the military and promote the civilian offices within the bureaucracy. He brought to trial two prominent military officers, Timasius and Abundantius. He also had Arcadius introduce two administrative innovations: the running of the cursus publicus (office of postmaster general) and the office in charge of manufacturing military equipment was transferred from the praetorian prefects to the magister officiorum (master of offices). Secondly, the role that Eutropius held, the praepositus sacri cubiculi (grand chamberlain) was given the rank of illustris, and therefore equal in rank to the praetorian prefects. In the autumn of 397 he issued a law in Arcadius's name, targeting the Roman military, where any conspiracy involving soldiers or the barbarian regiments against persons holding the rank of illustris was considered to be treason, with the conspirators to be sentenced to death, and their descendants to be deprived of citizenship.

In 398, Eutropius led a successful campaign against the Huns in Roman Armenia. The following year he convinced Arcadius to grant him the consulship, triggering protests across the empire. For traditionalists, the granting of the consulship to a eunuch and former slave was an insult to the Roman system and other contemporary Romans, and the western court refused to recognize him as consul. The crisis escalated when the Ostrogoths who had been settled in Asia Minor by Theodosius I revolted, demanding the removal of Eutropius.

==== Gothic Revolt of Tribigild ====
The emperor sent two forces against Tribigild, the rebel leader; the first, under an officer named Leo, was defeated. The second force was commanded by Gainas, rival of Eutropius in the Eastern court. He returned to Arcadius and argued that the Ostrogoths could not be defeated, and that it would be sensible to accede to their demand. Arcadius viewed this proposal with displeasure, but was convinced to support it by Eudoxia, who wished to take Eutropius's place as the main influence upon the emperor. Arcadius therefore dismissed Eutropius and sent him into exile (17 August 399), before recalling him to face trial and execution during the autumn of 399. The imperial edict issued by Arcadius detailing Eutropius's banishment survives:

The Emperors Arcadius and Honorius, Augusti, to Aurelian, Praetorian Prefect. We have added to our treasury all the property of Eutropius, who was formerly the Praepositus sacri cubiculi, having stripped him of his splendour, and delivered the consulate from the foul stain of his tenure, and from the recollection of his name and the base filth thereof =; so that, all his acts having been repealed, all time may be dumb concerning him; and that the blot of our age may not appear by the mention of him; and that those who by their valour and wounds extend the Roman borders or guard the same by equity in the maintenance of law, may not groan over the fact that the divine reward of consulship has been befouled and defiled by a filthy monster. Let him learn that he has been deprived of the rank of the patriciate and all lower dignities that he stained with the perversity of his character. That all the statues, all the images—whether of bronze or marble, or painted in colours, or of any other material used in art—we command to be abolished in all cities, towns, private and public places, that they may not, as a brand of infamy on our age, pollute the gaze of beholders. Accordingly under the conduct of faithful guards let him be taken to the island of Cyprus, whither let your sublimity know that he has been banished; so that therein guarded with most watchful diligence he may be unable to work confusion with his mad designs.

=== Later reign ===
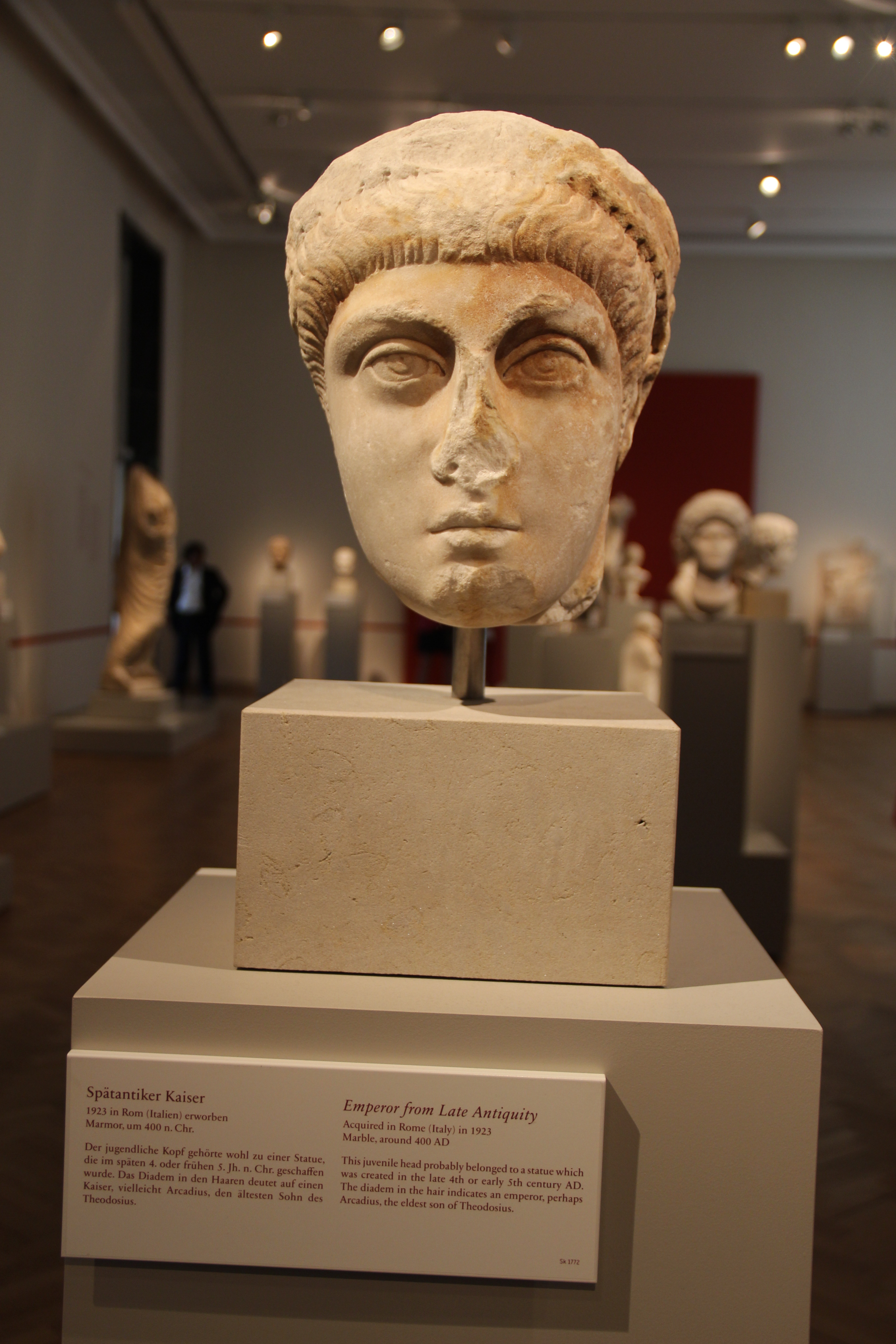
Portrait head of an emperor, potentially Arcadius

With Eutropius's fall from power, Gainas sought to take advantage of Arcadius's current predicament. He joined the rebel Ostrogoths, and, in a face to face meeting with Arcadius, forced the emperor to make him magister militum praesentalis and Consul designate for 401. Arcadius also acquiesced when Gainas asked for the dismissal of further officials, such as the urban prefect Aurelianus, as well as a place for settlement for his troops in Thrace. However, Arcadius refused to agree to Gainas's demand for an Arian church in Constantinople for his Gothic mercenaries, following the advice of John Chrysostom, the Archbishop of Constantinople.

By July 400, the actions of Gainas had irritated a significant portion of the population of Constantinople to the point that a general riot broke out in the capital. Although Gainas had stationed his troops outside of the capital walls, he was either unable or unwilling to bring them into the capital when many Goths in the city were hunted down and attacked. As many as 7,000 Goths were killed in the rioting; those who took refuge in a church were stoned and burned to death, after they received the emperor's permission, nor was it condemned by the Archbishop of Constantinople, John Chrysostom.

Although initially staying his hand (probably through the intervention of the new Praetorian Prefect of the East Caesarius), Gainas eventually withdrew with his Gothic mercenaries into Thrace and rebelled against Arcadius. He attempted to take his forces across the Hellespont into Asia, but was intercepted and defeated by Fravitta, another Goth who held the position of magister militum praesentalis. Following his defeat, Gainas fled to the Danube with his remaining followers, but was ultimately defeated and killed by Uldin the Hun in Thrace.

With the fall of Gainas, the next conflict emerged between Eudoxia and John Chrysostom. The Archbishop was a stern, ascetic individual, who was a vocal critic of all displays of extravagant wealth. But his ire tended to focus especially on wealthy women, and their use of clothing, jewellery and makeup as being vain and frivolous. Eudoxia assumed that Chrysostom's denunciations of extravagance in feminine dress were aimed at her. As the tensions between the two escalated, Chrysostom, who felt that Eudoxia had used her imperial connections to obtain the possessions of the wife of a condemned senator, preached a sermon in 401 in which Eudoxia was openly called Jezebel, the infamous wife of the Israelite king Ahab. Eudoxia retaliated by supporting Bishop Severian of Gabala in his conflict with Chrysostom. As Chrysostom was very popular in the capital, riots erupted in favour of the Archbishop, forcing Arcadius and Eudoxia to publicly back down and beg Chrysostom to revoke Severian's excommunication.

Then in 403, Eudoxia saw another chance to strike against the Archbishop, when she threw her support behind Theophilus of Alexandria who presided over a synod in 403 (the Synod of the Oak) to charge Chrysostom with heresy. Although Arcadius originally supported Chrysostom, the Archbishop's decision not to participate caused Arcadius to change his mind and support Theophilus, resulting in Chrysostom's deposition and banishment. He was called back by Arcadius almost immediately, as the people started rioting over his departure, even threatening to burn the imperial palace. There was an earthquake the night of his arrest, which Eudoxia took for a sign of God's anger, prompting her to ask Arcadius for John's reinstatement.

Peace was short-lived. In September 403 a silver statue of Eudoxia was erected in the Augustaion, near the Magna Ecclesia church. Chrysostom, who was conducting a mass at the time, denounced the noisy dedication ceremonies as pagan and spoke against the Empress in harsh terms: "Again Herodias raves; again she is troubled; she dances again; and again desires to receive John's head in a charger", an allusion to the events surrounding the death of John the Baptist. This time Arcadius was unwilling to overlook the insult to his wife; a new synod was called in early 404 where Chrysostom was condemned. Arcadius hesitated until Easter to enforce the sentence, but Chrysostom refused to go, even after Arcadius sent in a squad of soldiers to escort him into exile. Arcadius procrastinated, but by 20 June 404, the emperor finally managed to get the Archbishop to submit, and he was taken away to his place of banishment, this time to Abkhazia in the Caucasus. Eudoxia did not get to enjoy her victory for long, dying later that year.

== Death ==
In his later reign, Arcadius delegated a large amount of the responsibilities to Anthemius, the Praetorian Prefect. Anthemius attempted to heal the divisions of the past decade by trying to make peace with Stilicho in the West. Stilicho, however, had lost patience with the eastern court, and in 407 encouraged Alaric and the Visigoths to seize the Praetorian prefecture of Illyricum and hand it over to the western empire. Stilicho's plan failed, and soon after, on 1 May 408, Arcadius died. He was succeeded by his young son, Theodosius.

Like Constantine the Great and several of his successors, he was buried in the Church of the Holy Apostles, in a porphyry sarcophagus that was described in the 10th century by Constantine VII Porphyrogenitus in the De Ceremoniis.

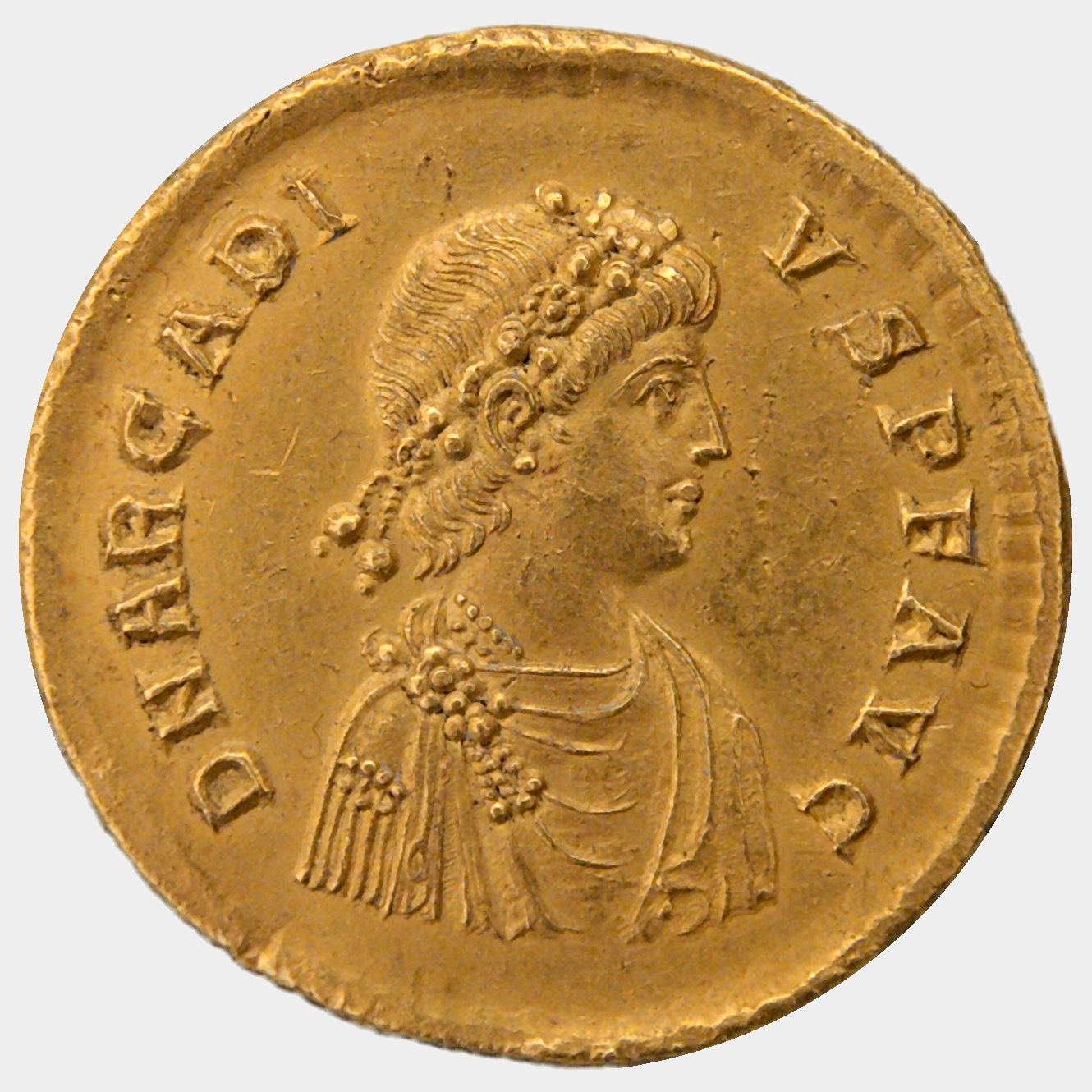
4 Solidi of Arcadius.

== Character and achievements ==
In noting the character of Arcadius, the historian J. B. Bury described him and his abilities thus:

He was of short stature, of dark complexion, thin and inactive, and the dullness of his wit was betrayed by his speech and by his sleepy, drooping eyes. His mental deficiency and the weakness of his character made it inevitable that he should be governed by the strong personalities of his court.

Traditional interpretations of the reign of Arcadius have revolved around his weakness as an Emperor, and the formulation of policy by prominent individuals (and the court parties that formed and regrouped round them) towards curtailing the increasing influence of barbarians in the military, which in Constantinople at this period meant the Goths. Scholars such as the historian J. B. Bury spoke of a group in Arcadius's court with Germanic interests and, opposed to them, a Roman faction. So, the revolt of Gainas, and the massacre of the Goths in Constantinople in 400, have traditionally been interpreted by scholars (such as Otto Seeck) as violent anti-barbarian reactions that prevented the rise of all-powerful Romanised barbarian military leaders—such as Stilicho was, in the West—in what has been termed the victory of anti-Germanism in the eastern empire.

The main source of this interpretation has been the works Synesius of Cyrene, specifically Aegyptus sive de providentia and De regno. Both works have traditionally been interpreted to support the thesis that there were anti-barbarian and pro-barbarian groups, with the Praetorian Prefect Aurelianus being the leader of the anti-barbarian faction. Recent scholarly research has revised this interpretation, and has instead favoured the interaction of personal ambition and enmities among the principal participants as being the leading cause for the court intrigue throughout Arcadius's reign. The gradual decline of the use of Gothic mercenaries in the eastern empire's armies that began in the reign of Arcadius was driven by recruitment issues, as the regions beyond the Danube were made inaccessible by the Huns, forcing the empire to seek recruitment in Asia Minor. The current consensus can be summarised by the historian Thomas S. Burns: "Despite much civilian distrust and outright hatred of the army and the barbarians in it, there were no anti-barbarian or pro-barbarian parties at the court."

Arcadius himself was more concerned with appearing to be a pious Christian than he was with political or military matters. Not being a military leader, he began to promote a new type of imperial victory through images, not via the traditional military achievements, but focusing on his piety. Arcadius's reign saw the growing push towards the outright abolishment of paganism. On 13 July 399, Arcadius issued an edict ordering that all remaining non-Christian temples should be immediately demolished.

In terms of buildings and monuments, a new forum was built in the name of Arcadius, on the seventh hill of Constantinople, the Xērolophos, in which a column was begun to commemorate his 'victory' over Gainas (although the column was only completed after Arcadius's death by Theodosius II). The Pentelic marble portrait head of Arcadius (now in the Istanbul Archaeology Museum) was discovered in Istanbul close to the Forum Tauri, in June 1949, in excavating foundations for new buildings of the university at Beyazit. The neck was designed to be inserted in a torso, but no statue, base or inscription was found. The diadem is a fillet with rows of pearls along its edges and a rectangular stone set about with pearls over the young Emperor's forehead.

A more nuanced assessment of Arcadius's reign was provided by Warren Treadgold:

By failing to reign, Arcadius had allowed a good deal of maladministration. But by continuing to reign—so harmlessly that nobody had taken the trouble to depose him—he had maintained legal continuity during a troubled time.

Arcadius had four children with Eudoxia: three daughters, Pulcheria, Arcadia and Marina; and one son, Theodosius, the future Emperor Theodosius II.

== Sources ==
=== Primary sources ===
- Zosimus, "Historia Nova", Book 5

=== Secondary sources ===
- McEvoy, Meaghan, An imperial jellyfish? The emperor Arcadius and imperial leadership in the late fourth century A.D.', in Erika Manders, Daniëlle Slootjes (eds), Leadership, ideology and crowds in the Roman empire of the fourth century AD. Stuttgart: Franz Steiner Verlag (2020).
- Nicholson, O. ed. (2018). "Arcadius, Flavius". The Oxford Dictionary of Late Antiquity.
- Lee, A. D. (2013). From Rome to Byzantium AD 363 to 565, Edinburgh University Press. ISBN 0-748-66835-7
- Liebeschuetz, J. H. W. G. (2011). Ambrose and John Chrysostom: Clerics Between Desert and Empire. Oxford University Press. ISBN 0-199-59664-6
- Goldsworthy, Adrian (2010). The Fall of the West: The Death of the Roman Superpower. Phoenix.
- Treadgold, Warren (1997). A History of the Byzantine State and Society. Stanford, California: Stanford University Press. ISBN 0-8047-2630-2.
- Long, Jacqueline (1996). Claudian's In Eutropium, Or, How, When, and why to Slander a Eunuch. University of North Carolina Press. ISBN 0-807-82263-9
- Burns, Thomas (1994). Barbarians within the Gates of Rome: A Study of Roman Military Policy and the Barbarians, CA. 375–425 A.D. Bloomington and Indianapolis: Indiana University Press. ISBN 978-0253312884.
- Cameron, Alan (1993). Barbarians and Politics at the Court of Arcadius. Berkeley: University of California Press. ISBN 0-520-06550-6.
- Kazhdan, Alexander ed. (1991). Arkadios. The Oxford Dictionary of Byzantium, pp. 173–174.
- Jones, A.H.M.; J.R. Martindale & J. Morris (1971). Prosopography of the Later Roman Empire. Vol. 1. Cambridge University Press. ISBN 0-521-07233-6.
- Bury, J. B. (1889). A History of the Later Roman Empire from Arcadius to Irene I.
- Gibbon, Edward (1932) [1789]. The Decline and Fall of the Roman Empire. New York: The Modern Library.

Arcadius Theodosian dynasty Born: 377 Died: 1 May 408
Regnal titles
Preceded by Theodosius I	Eastern Roman emperor 395–408	Succeeded by Theodosius II
Political offices
Preceded by Ricomer; Clearchus	Roman consul 385 with Bauto	Succeeded by Honorius; Euodius
Preceded by Eutolmius Tatianus; Q. Aurelius Symmachus	Roman consul II; 392 with Rufinus	Succeeded by Theodosius Augustus III; Abundantius
Preceded by Theodosius Augustus III; Abundantius	Roman consul III; 394 with Honorius Augustus II	Succeeded by Anicius Hermogenianus Olybrius; Anicius Probinus
Preceded by Anicius Hermogenianus Olybrius; Anicius Probinus	Roman consul IV; 396 with Honorius Augustus III	Succeeded by Caesarius; Nonius Atticus
Preceded by Vincentius; Fravitta	Roman consul V 402 with Honorius Augustus V	Succeeded by Theodosius Augustus; Rumoridus
Preceded by Stilicho II; Anthemius	Roman consul VI; 406 with Anicius Petronius Probus	Succeeded by Honorius Augustus VIII; Theodosius Augustus II
