= Anthemius (praetorian prefect) =

Early 5th-century Eastern Roman statesman

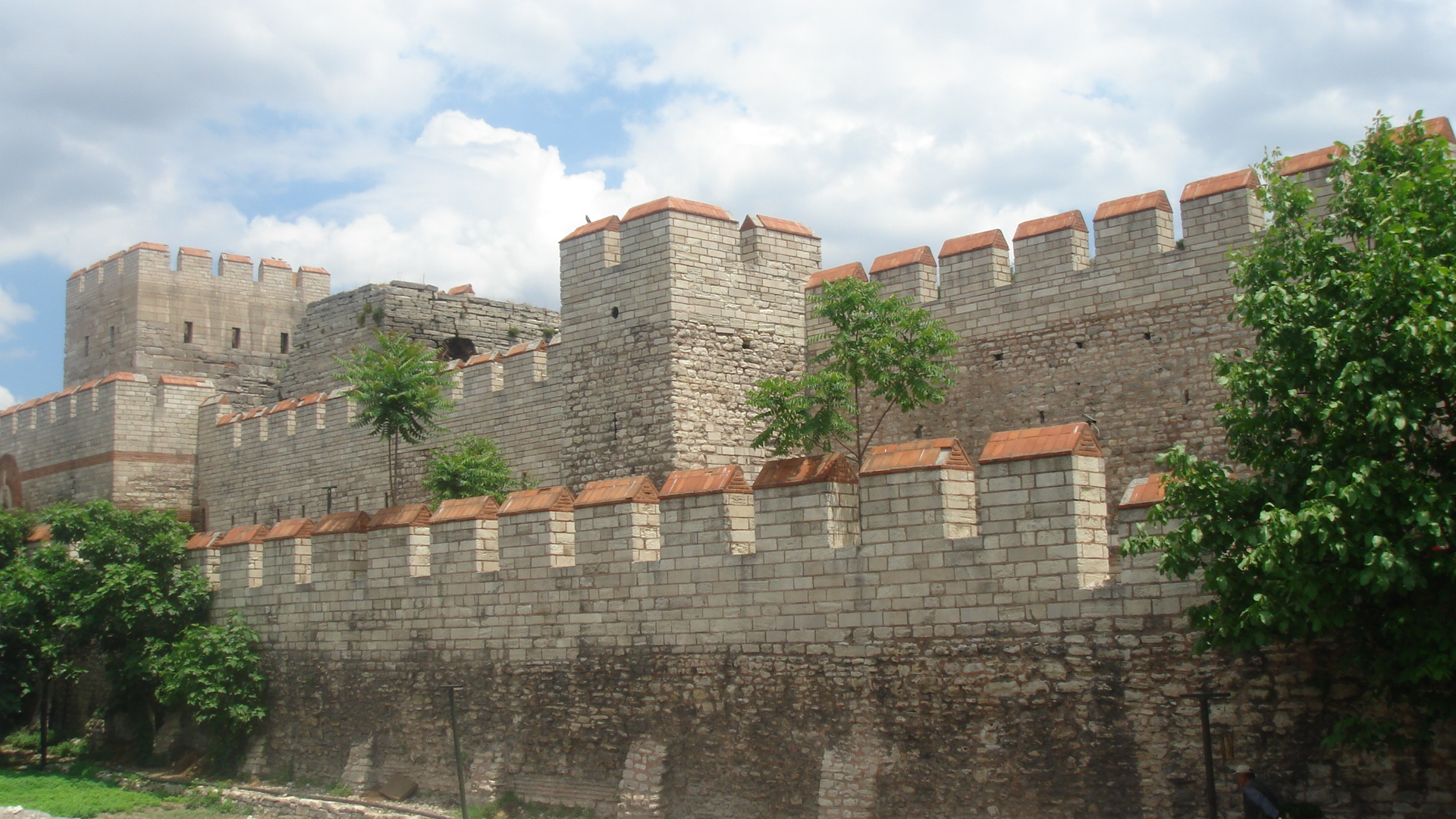
Section of the Theodosian Walls, first constructed under the supervision of Anthemius

Anthemius (Greek: Άνθέμιος, fl. 400–414) was a statesman of the Later Roman Empire. He is notable as a praetorian prefect of the East in the later reign of Arcadius and the first years of Theodosius II, during which time he led the government of the Eastern Roman Empire on behalf of the child emperor and supervised the construction of the first set of the Theodosian Walls.

== Biography ==
=== Early life ===
Anthemius was the grandson of Philippus, praetorian prefect of the East in 346. He rose to prominence during the reign of Arcadius, when he was appointed comes sacrarum largitionum ("Count of the Sacred Largesses") around or in 400 and later magister officiorum ("Master of the Offices") in 404. He occupied the latter position during the disturbances which followed John Chrysostom's final deposition from the patriarchate (Easter, 404). John's enemies demanded troops from him with which to disperse the crowd. At first he refused, but then yielded, declaring that they were responsible for the consequences.

=== Rise to power ===
In 405 he was appointed consul for the Eastern Roman Empire (with Stilicho as a colleague for the Western Empire). After the death of the Augusta Eudoxia he succeeded Eutychianus in the same year as praetorian prefect of the East, becoming thus the second most powerful man in the Eastern Empire after the Emperor himself. On 28 April 406, he was elevated to the rank of patricius. The esteem in which he was held by some can be seen from Chrysostom's letter of congratulations to him on his appointment to the praetorian prefecture, saying that "the office was more honoured by his tenure than he by the office". During the remaining years of Arcadius' reign he tried to maintain the autonomy and integrity of the Eastern Empire despite continuous challenges. According to some Eastern sources antagonistic to Stilicho, the Western general desired to take over the prefecture of Illyricum from the East. At the same time, Anthemius had to deal with the presence of Alaric I and his Gothic people in the Illyricum, and the continued insurgency of the Isaurians, who were devastating the southern provinces of Asia Minor. Furthermore, the court led by Anthemius passed a number of new laws against paganism, Judaism and heresy.

When Arcadius died in 408, his son and successor Theodosius II was a child of seven years. Anthemius assumed leadership, with an unusual longevity as praetorian prefect. He initiated a new peace treaty with Sassanid Persia, and, thanks also to Stilicho's death, was able to contribute in restoring harmony in the relations of the Imperial courts of Constantinople and Ravenna. He strengthened the fleet of the Danube, which protected the provinces of Moesia and Scythia, after the successful repulsion of an invasion in 409 by the Hunnic king Uldin.

He furthermore regulated the grain supply of Constantinople, which came chiefly from Egypt and was under the authority of the urban prefect. In the past, shortages had occurred due to the lack of available ships, resulting in famines, the most recent one being in 408. In 409 therefore, Anthemius reorganized the grain transport and granted tax remits to the transporters, took measures to procure grain from elsewhere, and created an emergency fund for the procurement and distribution of corn to the citizens. He also took measures to ensure the regular collection of taxes (409), but in 414, he also gave a tax remit of all arrears for the years 368–407.

=== Theodosian Walls ===
The one work of Anthemius' that is still standing today is the main wall of the Theodosian Walls. In the early 5th century, Constantinople had begun to outgrow the bounds set by Constantine the Great, and so Anthemius initiated the construction of a new wall, about 1,500 m westwards from the old one, which stretched for 6.5 kilometers between the Sea of Marmara and the suburb of Blachernae near the Golden Horn. The extended new wall was completed in 413 and almost doubled the size of the city, a feat for which Bury later called him "in a sense, the second founder of Constantinople".

=== Later life ===
In 414, Anthemius suddenly disappeared from the scene, while the prefecture was assumed by Monaxius. His fate remains unknown; some historians postulate he was dismissed by Augusta Pulcheria, while other scholars argue he retired or died of old age. After his departure, his descendants still retained political power. Through his daughter's marriage to magister militum Procopius, he became maternal grandfather to the later Western Emperor Anthemius. He was also the father of Anthemius Isidorus, praetorian prefect of the East in 435-436 and Eastern consul in 436. According to a legendary saint's life, he had a daughter named Apolinaria who lived as a monk.

== Sources ==
- John Bagnell Bury, History of the Later Roman Empire Vol. I, Macmillan & Co., Ltd. 1923
- Herbermann, Charles, ed. (1913). "Anthemius" . Catholic Encyclopedia. New York: Robert Appleton Company.

Preceded by Honorius Augustus VI; Aristaenetus	Roman consul 405 with Stilicho II	Succeeded by Arcadius Augustus VI; Anicius Petronius Probus
Preceded by Eutychianus (III)	Praetorian prefect of the East; 405–414	Succeeded by Monaxius
