= Plinta =

Roman general

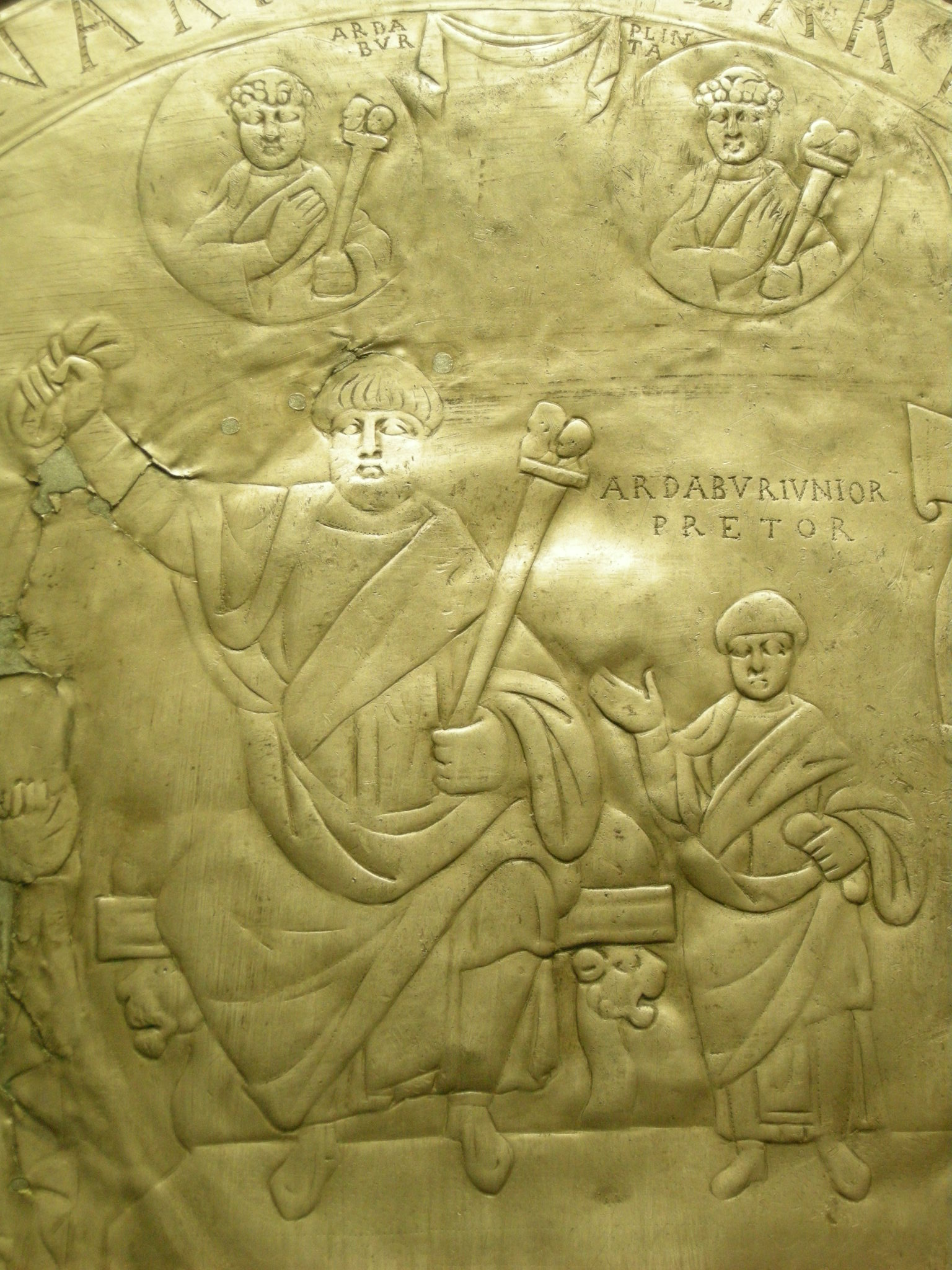
A detail of the Missorium of Aspar. Over Aspar and his son Ardabur, there are two imagines clipeatae depicting Flavius Ardabur and Plinta (right).

Flavius Plinta (fl. 418–438) was a Gothic politician and general of the Eastern Roman Empire. He held the title comes, and then became consul and magister militum praesentialis.

== Biography ==
In 418, as comes, he suppressed a revolt in Palestine, and it was perhaps in view of this success that the following year, in 419, he was promoted to consul posterior, concurrently with Monaxius, and Magister militum praesentialis. According to Sozomen, he was one of the most powerful figures at the court of Theodosius II.

Plinta was a Goth. He was related to Aspar (CIL XI, 2637), likely as his father-in-law, and father of Armatius. In 450 his daughter was given in marriage by Theodosius II to Constantius, the secretary of Attila. Plinta was an Arian of the sect of Psatirians (the followers of Marinus of Thrace), who, in Constantinople in 419, rejoined the other Arians.

In 431 he tried, unsuccessfully, to place Saturninus on the episcopal throne of Marcianopolis in place of the Nestorian Dorotheus. In 432 he advised the Bishop of Antioch, John, to accept the mediation of Theodosius II and to reconcile with the Patriarch of Alexandria, Cyril. Between 435 and 440 he asked the emperor to send him as ambassador, along with Flavius Dionysius, to Rugila, the King of the Huns. After Rugila died, Plinta and Epigenes were sent to his successor, Attila, with whom they negotiated and concluded the Treaty of Margus or the Peace of Horreum Margi.

== Bibliography ==
- Martindale, John R., ed. (1980). The Prosopography of the Later Roman Empire: Volume II, AD 395–527. Cambridge: Cambridge University Press. ISBN 0-521-20159-4.
- Given, John (2014). The Fragmentary History of Priscus. Merchantville, New Jersey: Evolution Publishing. ISBN 978-1-935228-14-1.
- Blockley, Roger C. (2009). The Fragmentary Classicising Historians of the Later Roman Empire. Vol. II. Cambridge, United Kingdom: Francis Cairns. ISBN 978-0-905205-51-9.
- Sozomen, Hermias (2018). The Ecclesiastical History of Sozomen. Merchantville, New Jersey: Evolution Publishing. ISBN 978-1-935228-15-8.
- Sozomen (1890). "Ecclesiastical History". In Schaff, Philip; Wace, Henry (eds.). Nicene and Post-Nicene Fathers, Second Series. Vol. 2. Translated by Chester D. Hartranft. Buffalo, NY: Christian Literature Publishing Co – via New Advent.

Preceded by Honorius Augustus XII; Theodosius Augustus VIII	Roman consul 419 with Monaxius	Succeeded by Theodosius Augustus IX; Constantius III
