= Monaxius =

Eastern Roman politician

Flavius Monaxius (Greek: Μονάξιος; floruit 408–420) was a politician of the Eastern Roman Empire, praefectus urbi of Constantinople, Consul and twice praetorian prefect of the East.

== Biography ==
From 17 January 408 to 26 April 409 he was praefectus urbi of Constantinople. Towards the end of his term, there was a shortage of food in the city, caused by delay in the shipment of grain from Alexandria to the capital, and the population revolted. The rebels burned the praetorium and dragged Monaxius' carriage around the streets. Grain supplies directed to other cities were sent to Constantinople, and the overall grain supply for the capital was re-organised. Monaxius also created an emergency fund, partially formed by senatorial contribution, to buy grain in case of shortage.

He was praetorian prefect of the East between 10 May and 30 November 414 and then a second time between 26 August 416 and 27 May 420; during his second tenure, he dedicated a church in Perinthus. Also, on October 5, 416, he issued an edict that removed the authority of Cyril of Alexandria over the parabolani. In 419 he held the consulship; after this year, four of his servants became monks at the monastery of Saint Hypatius against his will.

== Sources ==
- CIL III, 14207,05
- Martindale, John R., ed. (1980). "Fl. Monaxius". The Prosopography of the Later Roman Empire: Volume II, AD 395–527. Cambridge: Cambridge University Press. pp. 764–765. ISBN 0-521-20159-4.

| Preceded by Imp. Caesar Fl. Honorius Augustus XII, Imp. Caesar Fl. Theodosius Augustus VIII | Consul of the Roman Empire; 419 with Fl. Plinta | Succeeded by Imp. Caesar Fl. Theodosius Augustus IX, Fl. Constantius III |
| Preceded by Fl. Anthemius | Praetorian prefect of the East; 10 May - 30 November 414 | Succeeded by Aurelianus |
| Preceded by Aurelianus | Praetorian prefect of the East; 26 August 416 - 27 May 420 | Succeeded by Fl. Eustathius |
| Preceded by Aemilianus | Praefectus urbi of Constantinople; 17 January 408 - 26 April 409 | Succeeded by Anthemius Isidorus |
