= Synesius =

Ancient Greek bishop and alchemist (c.373–c.414)

Synesius of Cyrene
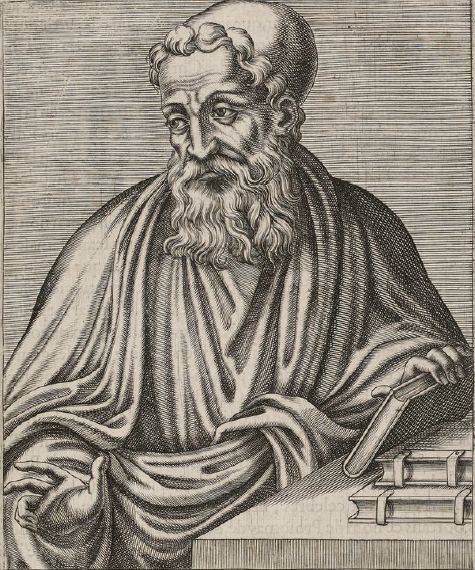
- Portrait from a publication by André Thevet, 1584
- Church: Great Church
- Diocese: Ptolemais

Personal details
- Born: c. 373
- Died: c. 414

Synesius of Cyrene (/sɪˈniːsiəs/; Greek: Συνέσιος; c. 373 – c. 414) was a Greek bishop of Ptolemais in ancient Libya, a part of the Western Pentapolis of Cyrenaica after 410. He was born of wealthy parents at Balagrae (now Bayda, Libya) near Cyrene between 370 and 375.

== Life ==
While still a youth (in 393), he went with his brother Euoptius to Alexandria, where he became an enthusiastic Neoplatonist and disciple of Hypatia. Between 395 and 399, he spent some time in Athens.

In 398 he was chosen as an envoy to the imperial court in Constantinople by Cyrene and the whole Pentapolis. He went to the capital on the occasion of the delivery of the aurum coronarium and his task was to obtain tax remissions for his country. In Constantinople he obtained the patronage of the powerful praetorian prefect Aurelianus. Synesius composed and addressed to Emperor Arcadius a speech entitled De regno, full of topical advice as to the studies of a wise ruler, but also containing a bold statement that the emperor's first priority must be a war on corruption and a war on the interpenetration of barbarians into the Roman army.

His three years' stay in Constantinople was wearisome and otherwise disagreeable; the leisure it forced upon him he devoted in part to literary composition. Aurelianus succeeded in granting him the tax remission for Cyrene and the Pentapolis and the exemption from curial obligations for him, but then he fell in disgrace and Synesius lost everything. Later Aurelian returned in power, restoring his own grants to Synesius. The poet, then, composed Aegyptus sive de providentia, an allegory in which the good Osiris and the evil Typhon, who represent Aurelian and the Goth Gainas (ministers under Arcadius), strive for mastery, and the question of the divine permission of evil is handled.

In 402, during an earthquake, Synesius left Constantinople to return to Cyrene. Along the road he passed through Alexandria, where he returned in 403; it was in the Egyptian city that he married and lived, before returning at Cyrene in 405. The following years were busy for Synesius. His major concern was the organisation of the defence of the Pentapolis from the yearly attacks of neighbouring tribes.

In 410 Synesius, whose Christianity had until then been by no means very pronounced, was popularly chosen to be bishop of Ptolemais, and, after long hesitation on personal and doctrinal grounds, he ultimately accepted the office thus thrust upon him, being consecrated by Theophilus at Alexandria. One personal difficulty at least was obviated by his being allowed to retain his wife, to whom he was much attached; but as regarded orthodoxy he expressly stipulated for personal freedom to dissent on the questions of the soul's creation, a literal resurrection, and the final destruction of the world, while at the same time he agreed to make some concession to popular views in his public teaching.

His tenure of the bishopric was troubled not only by domestic bereavements (his three sons died, the first two in 411 and the third in 413) but also by the Libyan invasions of the country who destroyed Cyrenaica and led him to exile, and by conflicts with the praeses Andronicus, whom he excommunicated for interfering with the Church's right of asylum. The date of his death is unknown, but it is most likely in 413, as he wrote a farewell letter to Hypatia that year from his death bed.

His many-sided activity, as shown especially in his letters, and his loosely mediating position between Neoplatonism and Christianity, make him a subject of fascinating interest. His scientific interests are attested by his letter to Hypatia, in which occurs the earliest known reference to a hydrometer, and by a work on alchemy in the form of a commentary on Pseudo-Democritus.

== Works ==
- A speech before the emperor Arcadius, De regno (On Kingship)
- Dio, sive de suo ipsius instituto, in which he signifies his purpose to devote himself to true philosophy
- Encomium calvitii, a literary jeu d'esprit, suggested by Dio Chrysostom's Praise of Hair
- Aegyptus sive de providentia, in two parts, also known as The Egyptian Tale, about the war against the Goth Gainas and the conflict between the two brothers Aurelianus and Caesarius
- De insomniis, a treatise on dreams
- Constitutio
- Catastasis, a description of the end of Roman Cyrenaica
- 159 Epistolae (letters, including one text, Letter 57, that is in fact a speech)
- 9 Hymni, of a contemplative, Neoplatonic character
- Two homilies
- An essay on making an astrolabe
- A book on dog breeding (no longer extant)
- Poems, mentioned in Synesius's letters (no longer extant)

=== Editions ===
- Editio princeps, Turnebus (Paris, 1553)
- Antonio Garzya, (ed.), Opere di Sinesio di Cirene, Classici greci, Torino: UTET, 1989 (with Italian translation)
- Lacombrade, Garzya, and Lamoureux (eds.), Synésios de Cyrène, Collection Budé, 6 vols., 1978–2008 (with French translation by Lacombrade, Roques, and Aujoulat)

=== Translations ===
- McAlhany, J. (2024) Beards & Baldness in the Middle Ages: Three Texts. Brooklyn, NY: Leverhill, 2024 (translation of Encomium calvitii, with notes). ISBN 979-8-9896993-0-8
- Fitzgerald, A. The Essays and Hymns of Synesius of Cyrene. 2 vols. Oxford, 1930.

== Legacy ==
A number of traditional Christian hymns, including "Lord Jesus, Think On Me", are based on his writings.
