= John Morris (historian) =

British historian (1913–1977)

- Born: 1913
- Died: 1977 (aged 63–64)
- Education: University of Oxford
- Occupation: Historian
- Employer: University College London

John Robert Morris (8 June 1913 – 1 June 1977) was an English historian who specialised in the study of the institutions of the Roman Empire and the history of Sub-Roman Britain. He is best known for his book The Age of Arthur (1973), which attempted to reconstruct the history of Britain and Ireland during the so-called "Dark Ages" (350–650 AD) following the Roman withdrawal, based on scattered archaeological and historical records. The book was heavily criticised by other academic historians.

== Biography ==
Morris read modern history at Jesus College, Oxford, from 1932 to 1935, and served in the Army during the Second World War. After the war, he held a Leon Fellowship at the University of London and a Junior Fellowship at the Warburg Institute. In 1948 he was appointed Lecturer in Ancient History at University College, London. He worked in India in 1968 and 1969 as a lecturer for the Indian University Grants Commission, before returning to UCL to become Senior Lecturer in Ancient History, a post he held until his death.

In 1952 Morris founded the historical journal Past & Present, which he edited until 1960, and remained chairman of the editorial board until 1972. He was one of the writers, along with A. H. M. Jones and J. R. Martindale, of The Prosopography of the Later Roman Empire, a biographical dictionary of the years 284–641, the first volume of which was published in 1971. He also instigated the publication of a new edition of the Domesday Book, and edited the Arthurian Period Sources series. His last book was Londinium: London in the Roman Empire, published posthumously in 1982.

Morris was a socialist and anti-war campaigner. He stood unsuccessfully for Parliament in 1935 as a Labour Party candidate, and was for a time secretary to the Labour MP George Strauss. He was a founder-member of the Committee of 100, an anti-war group founded by Bertrand Russell in 1960, and was later involved in the Institute for Workers' Control.

In 1975 Morris wrote the script "Domesday Republished" for the Look, Stranger BBC-TV series.

Morris died on 1 June 1977 in London.

== The Age of Arthur ==
The Age of Arthur (1973) was the first attempt by a professional historian to build a picture of Britain during the period 350–650, when King Arthur (whom Morris accepts as an authentic historical personage) was supposed to have lived. The book is not, however, exclusively about Arthur, but rather about the history of Celtic Britain during that era. The book also includes detailed chapters on Brittany on the grounds that its Celtic population which came from migrations from "Greater Britain" meant that "Little Britain" (Brittany) was as much heir to Roman Britannia as were England, Wales, Ireland, and Scotland.

Although popular with the public, the book was heavily criticised in professional historical circles, severely damaging Morris's academic reputation in the eyes of many of his peers. David Dumville launched a famously scathing attack on Morris's methodology; and while one of the most influential reviews of the book, by D. P. Kirby and J. E. Caerwyn Williams, described it as "an outwardly impressive piece of scholarship", it went on to argue that this apparent scholarship "crumbles upon inspection into a tangled tissue of fact and fantasy which is both misleading and misguided". Others, such as James Campbell, were more generous, but still considered that the Age of Arthur was so misleading and full of problems that it was really only of use to professional historians who could sort the interesting ideas from the flights of fantasy. Charles Thomas described it in 1994 as a "stupendous though exasperating book". The British Museum's Department of Medieval and Later Antiquities marked their copy of the book with "do not recommend for the general public/uninitiated".

== Collections ==
University College London holds Morris' correspondence and working papers from 1944 - 1977. The majority of material was donated by Morris' widow, Susan Morris, in 1979; further donations from Susan Morris and their son arrived in 1986, and in 2003 Eric Hobsbawm donated material relating to Past & Present.

== Selected works ==
- Prosopography of the Later Roman Empire, ed. with A. H. M. Jones and J. R. Martindale:
  - Volume 1 (Cambridge University Press, 1971) from 260 to 395
  - Volume 2 (Cambridge University Press, 1980) from 395 to 527
- Arthurian Period Sources series, ed. John Morris:
  - The Age of Arthur: Volume 1: Roman Britain and the Empire of Arthur (London: Phillimore)
  - The Age of Arthur: Volume 2: The Successor States (London: Phillimore)
  - The Age of Arthur: Volume 3: Church, Society and Economy (London: Phillimore)
  - Arthurian period sources, vol. 1: Introduction, notes and index (London: Phillimore)
  - Arthurian period sources, vol. 2: Annals and Charters (London: Phillimore)
  - Arthurian period sources, vol. 3: Persons (London: Phillimore)
  - Arthurian period sources, vol. 4: Places and Peoples and Saxon Archaeology (London: Phillimore)
  - Arthurian period sources, vol. 5: Genealogies and texts (London: Phillimore)
  - Arthurian period sources, vol. 6: Studies in Dark-Age History (London: Phillimore)
  - Arthurian period sources, vol. 7: Gildas, The Ruin of Britain and Other Documents (London: Phillimore, 1978)
  - Arthurian period sources, vol. 8: Nennius: British History and the Welsh Annals (London & Chichester: Phillimore, 1980)
- Londinium: London in the Roman Empire (London: Weidenfeld & Nicolson, 1982)
