= 390s =

Decade

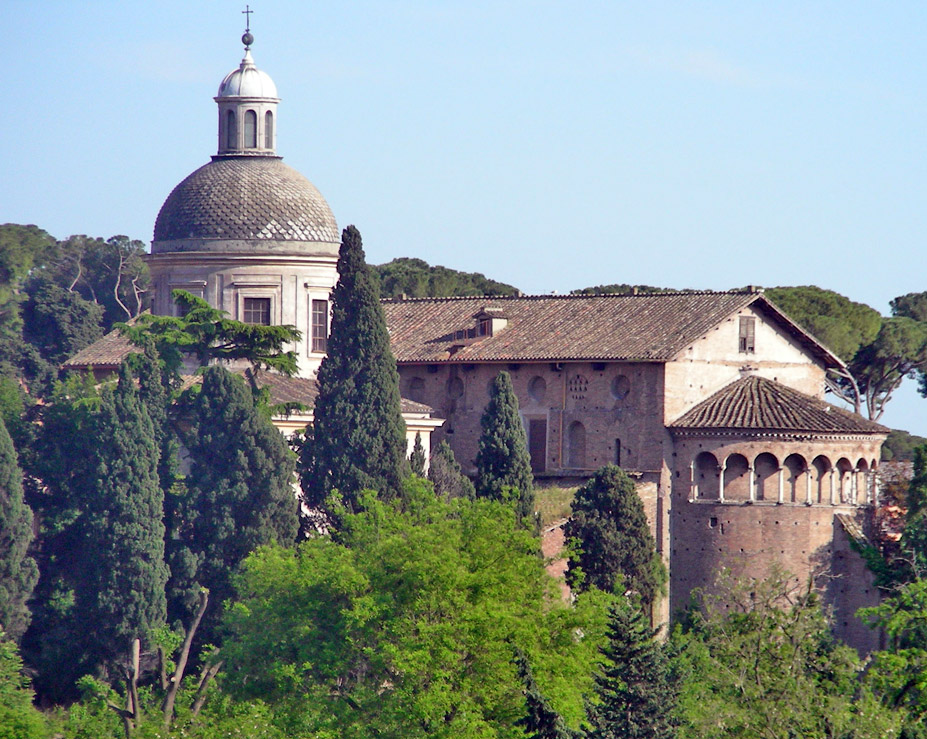
The Basilica of Saints Giovanni and Paolo at Celius, built in Rome in 398.

The 390s decade ran from January 1, 390 to December 31, 399

== Events ==
=== By place ===
==== Roman Empire ====
- April – Massacre of Thessalonica: Resentment among the citizens of Thessalonica (Macedonia) breaks out into violence after the arrest of a popular charioteer. Butheric, military commander of Illyricum, is murdered. Emperor Theodosius I orders vengeance, despite the pleas for mercy by Ambrose, bishop of Milan; more than 7,000 inhabitants are massacred by the Roman army.
- Ambrose retires to Milan (residence of Theodosius I) and refuses to celebrate a mass in the emperor's presence, until he repents for ordering the massacre in Thessalonica. Theodosius, filled with remorse, kneels in humility and strips off his royal purple, before the altar of the cathedral in Milan, humbling himself before the church.
- The Visigoths and Huns, led by Alaric, invade Thrace. Stilicho, high-ranking general (magister militum) of Vandal origin, raises an army and begins a campaign against the Goths.
- Theodosius I brings an obelisk from Egypt to the Hippodrome of Constantinople.

==== India ====
- Rudrasena II of Vakataka succeeds his father, Prithivishena I. In the same year he marries Prabhavatigupta, daughter of the Gupta king Chandragupta II.

=== By topic ===
==== Art ====
- C. 390–401 – Priestess of Bacchus: Late Antiquity ivory diptych; documents the relationship of the senators Quintus Aurelius Symmachus and Virius Nicomachus Flavianus. It commemorates the marriage of the two families. The right panel is inscribed "Symmachorum", with an elaborately dressed priestess who makes an offer on an altar. It is now kept at the Victoria and Albert Museum in London.

==== Religion ====
- Jerome, having finished the Latin translation of the New Testament, begins translating the Old Testament.
- The Kama Sutra is revised by Vatsyayana.

=== By place ===
==== Roman Empire ====
- Emperor Theodosius I establishes Christianity as the official state religion. All non-Christian temples in the Roman Empire are closed. The eternal fire in the Temple of Vesta at the Roman Forum is extinguished, and the Vestal Virgins are disbanded.
- Quintus Aurelius Symmachus, urban prefect of Rome, pleads for traditional cult practices. He petitions Theodosius I to re-open the pagan temples, but is opposed by Ambrose.
- Saint Telemachus dies after being stoned to death. His date of death is also given to the year 404.

==== Asia ====
- A Rouran chief named Heduohan (曷多汗) is defeated and killed in battle against the Tuoba Northern Wei Dynasty. Surviving Rouran move west towards the Gaoche, led by Heduohan's brother and successor, Shelun.
- King Gwanggaeto the Great of Goguryeo (Korea) ascends to the throne.

=== By topic ===
==== Literature ====
- Flames destroy the great Library of Alexandria, established in the Mouseion in the fourth century BC. Among the items lost in the fire are works of science, including parchments by the Greek astronomer Aristarchus of Samos asserting that the Earth orbits the Sun, and dozens of dramatic works by Euripides and Sophocles.

==== Religion ====
- Patriarch Theophilus destroys all pagan temples in Alexandria under orders from Theodosius I. Christians go on an iconoclastic rampage, smashing religious symbols or monuments through the city and destroying the Temple of Serapis. The "Order of Monks" known as the Parabalani take charge of patrolling the streets.

=== By place ===
==== Roman Empire ====
- Stilicho, Roman general (magister militum), defeats the Visigoths and Huns in Thrace. Emperor Theodosius I permits Alaric to go free on condition he provides, as foederati, military services to the Roman Empire.
- May 15 – Emperor Valentinian II, age 21, dies while advancing into Gaul against the Frankish usurper Arbogast. He is found hanging in his residence at Vienne under unknown circumstances.
- August 22 – Arbogast nominates Eugenius, Roman teacher of rhetoric, as the next emperor of the Western Roman Empire. He sends ambassadors to Theodosius's court asking for his recognition.
- November 8 – Theodosius I issues an edict reinforcing the prohibition of prayers or sacrifices at non-Christian temples, leading to the persecution of pagans and the end of the almost 2,000-year-old Eleusinian Mysteries. He also bans items of pagan spiritual significance that could be used in the home, such as incense or spiritual figures.

==== Asia ====
- Asin becomes king of the Korean kingdom of Baekje.

=== By place ===
==== Roman Empire ====
- January 23 – Emperor Theodosius I proclaims his son Honorius, age 8, co-ruler (Augustus) of the Western Roman Empire.
- Theodosius I demands the destruction of pagan temples, holy sites, and ancient objects throughout the Roman Empire.
- Theodosius I abolishes the Greek Olympic Games, ending a thousand years of festivals, as part of the general Christian policy to establish universal Christian worship in accordance with the doctrines set forth in the Nicene Creed (the next Olympic Games will not be held until 1896).

==== China ====
- Yao Xing succeeds Yao Chang as emperor of the Later Qin Empire.
- Chinese astronomers observe the guest star SN 393.

=== By topic ===
==== Religion ====
- Synod of Hippo: A council at Hippo Regius (Algeria) is hosted by the Church. The bishops approve a canon of Sacred Scripture that correspond to the Roman Catholic Church.

=== By place ===
==== Roman Empire ====
- September 6 – Battle of the Frigidus: Emperor Theodosius I defeats and kills the usurper Eugenius. The forces of Theodosius are bolstered by numerous auxiliaries, including 20,000 Visigoth federates under Alaric. The Frankish general Arbogast (magister militum) escapes into the Alps and commits suicide.
- Late Roman army: The Notitia Dignitatum shows the development of forces in the Roman Empire. By now 200,000 soldiers guard the borders, and a reserve force of 50,000 is available for deployment. Many non-Roman soldiers are from Germanic tribes: Alamanni, Franks, Goths, Saxons and Vandals.
- Winter – The Huns cross the frozen Danube and destroy the villages built by the Goths. Theodosius I, six hundred miles away in Italy, sends no reinforcements to defend the northern frontier.
- In Rome, the sacred fire stops burning (see Vesta and Vestal Virgins).

==== Egypt ====
- The last known hieroglyphic inscription, known as the Graffito of Esmet-Akhom, is written in Philae, Egypt.

==== China ====
- The last ruler of Former Qin, Fu Chong, is killed in battle against an army of Western Qin, bringing Former Qin to an end.

=== By topic ===
==== Religion ====
- Epiphanius of Salamis attacks Origen's followers and urges John II, Bishop of Jerusalem, to condemn his writings.
- The Council of Bagaï in Africa brings 310 Donatist bishops together.

=== By place ===
==== Roman Empire ====
- January 17 – Emperor Theodosius I, age 48, dies of a disease involving severe edema in Milan. The Roman Empire is divided for the final time into an eastern and a western half. The Eastern Roman Empire is centered in Constantinople under Arcadius, son of Theodosius, and the Western Roman Empire in Mediolanum under his brother Honorius.
- April 27 – Arcadius marries Aelia Eudoxia, daughter of the Frankish general Flavius Bauto (without the knowledge or consent of Rufinus, Praetorian prefect of the East). His seven-year-old half-sister, Galla Placidia, is sent to Rome, where she spends her childhood in the household of Stilicho and his wife Serena.
- Revolt of Alaric I:
  - Alaric, Visigothic leader of the foederati, renounces Roman fealty and is declared king, waging war against both parts of the Roman Empire, and ending a 16-year period of peace.
  - Alaric besieges Constantinople. After commitments from Rufinus, the Pretorian prefect of the East, and chief adviser to Arcadius, the Goths move further west.
  - Stilicho arrives in the fall with his army to fight the Goths. Rufinus, the strong man of the east, persuades the emperor to cancel Stilicho's campaign. Emperor Arcadius forbade Stilicho to attack Alaric and demandes that his army leave the territory of the East Roman Empire.
  - The Goths, led by Alaric, invade and devastate Thrace and Macedonia and impose a tribute on Athens.
- November 27 – Rufinus, Praetorian prefect of the East, is murdered by Gothic mercenaries under Gainas.

==== Asia ====
- December 8 – Later Yan is defeated by its former vassal Northern Wei at the Battle of Canhe Slope, during the Southern and Northern Dynasties period of China.
- The Huns begin their large-scale attack on the Eastern Roman Empire. They invade Armenia, Cappadocia, and enter parts of Syria, threatening Antioch.

==== India ====
- King Rudrasimha III, ruler of the Western Satraps (India), is defeated by the Gupta Empire.

=== By topic ===
==== Agriculture ====
- An estimated 330,000 acres of farmland lie abandoned in Campania (southern Italy), partly as a consequence of malaria from mosquitoes bred in swampy areas, but mostly because imprudent agriculture has ruined the land.

==== Religion ====
- Augustine, age 40, becomes bishop of Hippo Regius (modern Algeria). His assignment is the reunification of the Roman Catholic Church in Africa, primarily focusing on the Donatist movement led by Primianus of Carthage.

=== By place ===
==== Roman Empire ====
- Stilicho, Roman general (magister militum), controls the young emperor Honorius as his regent, and becomes the de facto ruler of the Western Roman Empire. He enlists the Alemanni and the Franks, to defend the Rhine frontier.
- Revolt of Alaric I: The Visigoths, led by Alaric I, rampage through Greece and plunder Corinth, Argos and Sparta. They destroy the Temple of Eleusis, and harry the Peloponnese. Stilicho makes peace with the Goths, and allows them to settle in Epirus (Balkans).

==== China ====
- Emperor Jìn Ān Dì, age 14, succeeds his father Emperor Xiaowu as ruler of the Eastern Jin dynasty after he is murdered by his concubine Honoured Lady Zhang.
- Lü Guang claims the title "Heavenly Prince" (Tian Wang), signifying his claim to the Later Liang Kingdom.

=== By place ===
==== Roman Empire ====
- Revolt of Alaric I: Stilicho traps the Visigoths under King Alaric in the Peloponnese, but decides to abandon the campaign against the Visigoths in Greece, thus allowing King Alaric to escape north to Epirus with his loot. Presumably, Stilicho has left Greece in order to prepare for military action in northern Africa, where a rebellion (see Gildonic Revolt in 398) seems imminent.
- Emperor Honorius passes a law making barbarian styles of dress illegal in the city of Rome. As a result of this law, everybody in Rome is forbidden from wearing boots, trousers, animal skins, and long hair. This law is passed in response to the increasing popularity of barbarian fashions among the people of Rome.

==== China ====
- The Xiongnu occupy the Gansu area, an economically important province situated along the Silk Road.

=== By topic ===
==== Religion ====
- April 4 – Ambrose, Archbishop of Milan, dies in his diocese after 23 years in office, during which he dominated the political life of the Roman Empire.
- August 28 – Council of Carthage: The biblical canon is definitely declared.
- September 7 – First Council of Toledo: Hispanic bishops, including Lampius, condemn Priscillianism.
- November 13 – John Chrysostom is appointed Archbishop of Constantinople.
- Mor Gabriel Monastery is founded and located on the Tur Abdin plateau near Midyat (Turkey).
- Sulpicius Severus writes the earliest biography of Martin of Tours, the first known "life of a saint" ever written.
- Augustine of Hippo begins his Confessions, an autobiography that recounts his intellectual and spiritual development.
- Scottish missionary Ninian establishes a church (Candida Casa) at Whithorn, and begins his work among the Picts.

=== By place ===
==== Roman Empire ====
- Revolt of Alaric I: After Stilicho returns to Italy, the Eastern Roman Empire concludes a peace treaty with Alaric. The Visigoths are given a settlement area in Illyricum and their king is appointed magister militum per Illyricum.
- Gildonic Revolt: Gildo, a Berber serving as a high-ranking official (comes) in Mauretania, rebels against the Western Roman Empire. The Gildonic Revolt is instigated by a powerful official in the Eastern Roman Empire named Eutropius, who wishes to undermine his enemies in the Western Roman Empire by cutting off the grain supply to Rome. After Gildo takes much of North Africa and cuts off the grain supply to Rome, Flavius Stilicho returns to Italy to raise troops against the rebels. After a short campaign in the desert, he defeats Gildo. Gildo flees and commits suicide by hanging himself.
- Eutropius, Roman general (magister militum), celebrates his victory over the Huns ("the wolves of the North") in a parade through Constantinople (see 395).
- An imperial edict obliges Roman landowners with plantations to yield 1/3 of their fields to the "barbarians" who have been settled in the Roman Empire.
- Emperor Honorius marries Stilicho's daughter Maria.
- Possible date for the Second Pictish War.

=== By topic ===
==== Religion ====
- John Chrysostom, Archbishop of Constantinople, receives a delegation of clergy who want to close the pagan temples at Gaza (Palestine) where worshippers are openly defying the law. John works through the eunuch Eutropius, who has great power over emperor Arcadius, and within a week an imperial Constitution is issued closing the Roman temples, but the official appointed to execute this order is bribed.
- Augustine of Hippo completes his Confessions, an autobiography that recounts his intellectual and spiritual development.

=== By place ===
==== Roman Empire ====
- The Emperor Honorius of the Western Roman Empire, who is only 15 years old, closes the gladiatorial schools in Rome, and legally ends munera (gladiator games).
- Flavius Mallius Theodorus becomes Roman consul and official at the imperial court of emperor Arcadius.
- Gainas, a Gothic leader, is made magister militum and forms an alliance with deserters of Tribigild along the Bosphorus. He proclaims himself co-regent (usurper), and installs his forces in Constantinople. Gainas deposes anti-Gothic officials and has Eutropius, imperial advisor (cubicularius), executed.

==== Middle East ====
- King Bahram IV dies after an 11-year reign. He is succeeded by Yazdegerd I, who becomes the thirteenth Sassanid Emperor of Persia.

==== Asia ====
- Fa-Hien, Chinese Buddhist monk, travels to India, Sri Lanka and Kapilavastu (modern Nepal).
- Xianbei kingdom of Southern Yan conquers Qing Province (modern central and eastern Shandong) from the Eastern Jin.

=== By topic ===
==== Religion ====
- November 26 – Pope Siricius dies at Rome after a 15-year reign in which he has commanded celibacy for priests, asserted papal authority over the entire Western Church, and threatened to impose sanctions on those who do not follow his dictates.
- Anastasius I succeeds Siricius as the 39th pope. He seeks to reconcile the churches of Rome and Antioch. Anastasius also condemns the doctrine of Origen.
- Flavian I is acknowledged as legitimate bishop of Antioch by the Church of Rome.

== Significant people ==
- Arcadius, Eastern Roman Emperor
- Honorius, Western Roman Emperor

== Births ==
390

- Bleda, king of the Huns (approximate date)
- Gao Yun, duke of the Xianbei state Northern Wei (d. 487)
- Prosper of Aquitaine, disciple and Christian writer (approximate date)
- Romanus of Condat, hermit and saint (approximate date)
- Simeon Stylites, Christian Stylite (approximate date)
- Tonantius Ferreolus, prefect of Gaul (approximate date)
- Xie Hui, general of the Liu Song dynasty (d. 426)

391

- Flavius Aetius, Roman general (Magister militum) of part Gothic heritage. (d.454)

392

- Flavius Marcian, Roman Emperor (d. 457)
- Galla Placidia, Roman Empress and daughter of Theodosius I (d. 450)
- Ming Yuan Di, emperor of the Xianbei state Northern Wei (d. 423)

393

- Sima Maoying, empress of the Liu Song dynasty (d. 439)
- Theodoret of Cyrrhus, bishop and theologian (approximate date)

394

- Gunabhadra, Indian Buddhist scholar-monk (d. 468)
- Jangsu, Korean king of Goguryeo (d. 491)

396

- Petronius Maximus, Western Roman Emperor (approximate date)

397

- March 30 or March 31 – Kʼukʼ Bahlam I, king of Palenque (Yucatán Peninsula, Mexico)

398

- Fan Ye, Chinese historian (d. 445)

399

- Narsai, Syriac poet and theologian (approximate date)

== Deaths ==
390

- January 25 – Gregory Nazianzus, theologian and Patriarch of Constantinople (b. 329)
- Apollinaris of Laodicea, bishop and theologian
- Aurelius Victor, Roman historian and politician
- Chen Guinü, queen consort of Jin Xiaowudi
- Diodorus of Tarsus, bishop and monastic reformer

391

- Heduohan, chief of the Rouran tribes (killed in battle against the Northern Wei)
- Justina, Roman empress (approximate date)
- Macarius of Egypt, Christian monk and hermit
- Peter of Sebaste, bishop of Armenia
- Zhai Liao "Heavenly Prince" (Tian Wang), founder of the Dingling state Wei

392

- May 15 – Valentinian II, Roman Emperor (b. 371)
- Gregory Bæticus, bishop of Elvira (Spain)

393

- Eunomius of Cyzicus, Arian bishop and theologian
- Zhai Zhao "Heavenly Prince" (Tian Wang), emperor of Wei

394

- September 6 – Eugenius, Roman usurper
- September 8 – Arbogast, Frankish general
- Fu Chong, emperor of the Chinese Di state Former Qin
- Fu Deng, emperor of the Di state Former Qin (b. 343)
- Murong Yong, emperor of the Xianbei state Western Yan
- Virius Nicomachus Flavianus, Roman historian and politician (b. 334)
- Yao Chang, emperor of the Qiang state Later Qin (b. 331)

395

- January 17 – Theodosius I, Roman emperor (b. 347)
- November 27 – Rufinus, Roman consul and politician
- Apa Bane, Christian hermit and saint
- Ausonius, Roman poet and rhetorician
- Gelasius of Caesarea, Christian bishop
- Macarius of Alexandria, Christian monk

396

- Duan Yuanfei, empress and wife of emperor Murong Chui
- Dowager Helan, mother of emperor Wei Daowudi (b. 351)
- Jin Xiaowudi, emperor of the Eastern Jin Dynasty (b. 362)
- Murong Chui, general and founder of Later Yan (b. 326)

397

- April 4 – Aurelius Ambrosius, bishop of Milan
- November 8 – Martin of Tours, bishop and saint
- Murong Hui, imperial prince of Later Yan (b. 373)
- Murong Long, general and prince of Later Yan
- Empress She, wife of emperor Yao Chang

398

- May 27 – Murong Bao, emperor of the Xianbei state Later Yan (b. 355)
- August 15 – Lan Han, official of the Xianbei state Lan Yan
- Didymus the Blind, Alexandrian theologian
- Gildo, Moorish prince and comes Africae (governor)
- Murong Lin, Chinese prince of the Xianbei state Later Yan
- Murong Nong, Chinese prince of the Xianbei state Later Yan
- Nectarius, archbishop of Constantinople

399

- November 26 – Pope Siricius
- Bahram IV, king of the Sassanid Empire (Persia)
- Eutropius, Roman consul and eunuch
- Evagrius Ponticus, Christian monk and ascetic (b. 345)
- Fabiola, Christian saint
- Nintoku, emperor of Japan
- Tribigild, Ostrogothic general
- Tufa Wugu, prince of the Xianbei state Southern Liang
- Yuan Shansong, official and poet of the Jin Dynasty
