= 396 =

396 in various calendars
Gregorian calendar	396; CCCXCVI
Ab urbe condita	1149
Assyrian calendar	5146
Balinese saka calendar	317–318
Bengali calendar	−198 – −197
Berber calendar	1346
Buddhist calendar	940
Burmese calendar	−242
Byzantine calendar	5904–5905
Chinese calendar	乙未年 (Wood Goat); 3093 or 2886 — to — 丙申年 (Fire Monkey); 3094 or 2887
Coptic calendar	112–113
Discordian calendar	1562
Ethiopian calendar	388–389
Hebrew calendar	4156–4157
- Hindu calendars
Vikram Samvat	452–453
Shaka Samvat	317–318
Kali Yuga	3496–3497
Holocene calendar	10396
Iranian calendar	226 BP – 225 BP
Islamic calendar	233 BH – 232 BH
Javanese calendar	279–280
Julian calendar	396; CCCXCVI
Korean calendar	2729
Minguo calendar	1516 before ROC 民前1516年
Nanakshahi calendar	−1072
Seleucid era	707/708 AG
Thai solar calendar	938–939
Tibetan calendar	阴木羊年 (female Wood-Goat); 522 or 141 or −631 — to — 阳火猴年 (male Fire-Monkey); 523 or 142 or −630

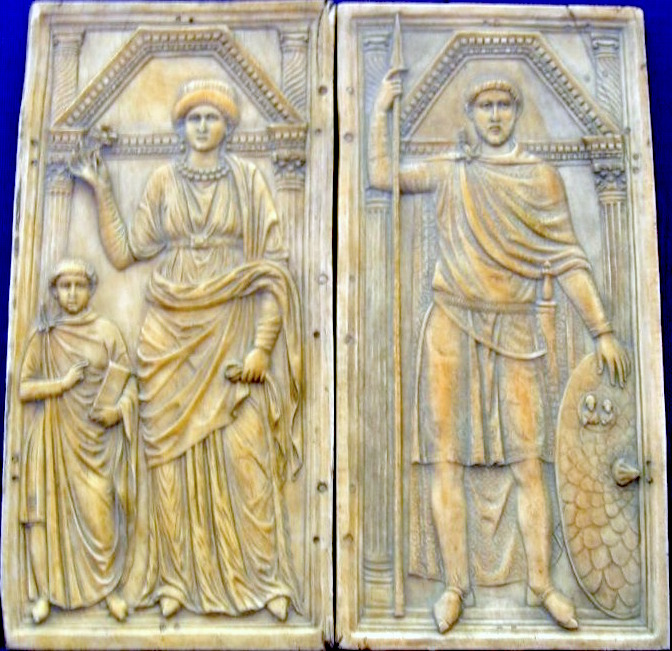
An ivory diptych of Stilicho (right) with his wife Serena and son Eucherius

Year 396 (CCCXCVI) was a leap year starting on Tuesday of the Julian calendar. In the Roman Empire, it was known as the Year of the Consulship of Augustus and Augustus (or, less frequently, year 1149 Ab urbe condita). The denomination 396 for this year has been used since the early medieval period, when the Anno Domini calendar era became the prevalent method in Europe for naming years.

== Events ==
=== By place ===
==== Roman Empire ====
- Stilicho, Roman general (magister militum), controls the young emperor Honorius as his regent, and becomes the de facto ruler of the Western Roman Empire. He enlists the Alemanni and the Franks, to defend the Rhine frontier.
- Revolt of Alaric I: The Visigoths, led by Alaric I, rampage through Greece and plunder Corinth, Argos and Sparta. They destroy the Temple of Eleusis, and harry the Peloponnese. Stilicho makes peace with the Goths, and allows them to settle in Epirus (Balkans).

==== China ====
- Emperor Jìn Ān Dì, age 14, succeeds his father Emperor Xiaowu as ruler of the Eastern Jin dynasty after he is murdered by his concubine Honoured Lady Zhang.
- Lü Guang claims the title "Heavenly Prince" (Tian Wang), signifying his claim to the Later Liang Kingdom.

== Births ==
- Petronius Maximus, Western Roman Emperor (approximate date)

== Deaths ==
- Duan Yuanfei, empress and wife of emperor Murong Chui
- Dowager Helan, mother of emperor Wei Daowudi (b. 351)
- Jin Xiaowudi, emperor of the Eastern Jin Dynasty (b. 362)
- Murong Chui, general and founder of Later Yan (b. 326)
