= 398 =

398 in various calendars
- Gregorian calendar: 398; CCCXCVIII
- Ab urbe condita: 1151
- Assyrian calendar: 5148
- Balinese saka calendar: 319–320
- Bengali calendar: −196 – −195
- Berber calendar: 1348
- Buddhist calendar: 942
- Burmese calendar: −240
- Byzantine calendar: 5906–5907
- Chinese calendar: 丁酉年 (Fire Rooster); 3095 or 2888 — to — 戊戌年 (Earth Dog); 3096 or 2889
- Coptic calendar: 114–115
- Discordian calendar: 1564
- Ethiopian calendar: 390–391
- Hebrew calendar: 4158–4159
- Hindu calendars
- Vikram Samvat: 454–455
- Shaka Samvat: 319–320
- Kali Yuga: 3498–3499
- Holocene calendar: 10398
- Iranian calendar: 224 BP – 223 BP
- Islamic calendar: 231 BH – 230 BH
- Javanese calendar: 281–282
- Julian calendar: 398; CCCXCVIII
- Korean calendar: 2731
- Minguo calendar: 1514 before ROC 民前1514年
- Nanakshahi calendar: −1070
- Seleucid era: 709/710 AG
- Thai solar calendar: 940–941
- Tibetan calendar: མེ་མོ་བྱ་ལོ་ (female Fire-Bird); 524 or 143 or −629 — to — ས་ཕོ་ཁྱི་ལོ་ (male Earth-Dog); 525 or 144 or −628

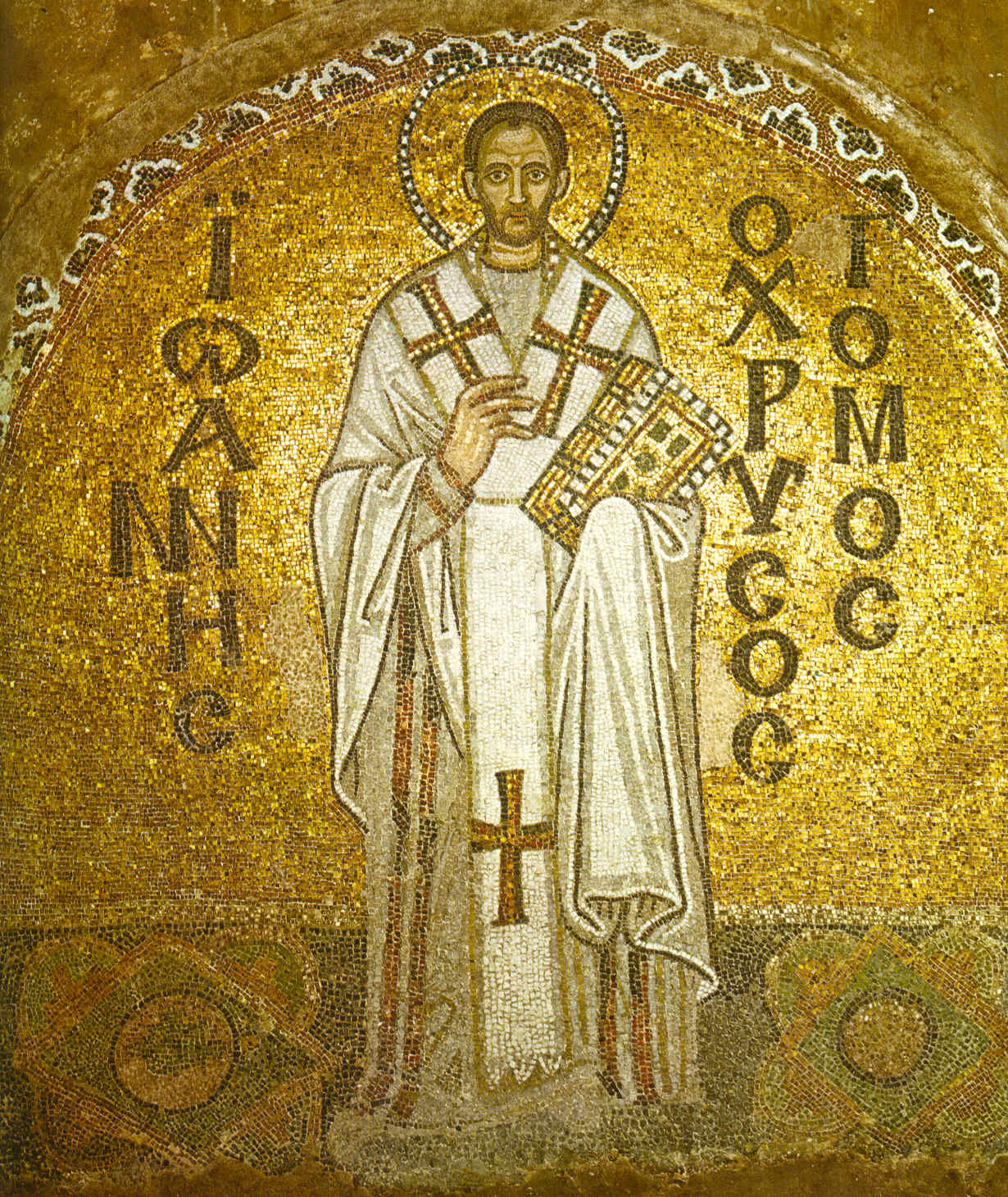
Saint John Chrysostom (Constantinople)

Year 398 (CCCXCVIII) was a common year starting on Friday of the Julian calendar. At the time, it was known as the Year of the Consulship of Augustus and Eutychianus (or, less frequently, year 1151 Ab urbe condita). The denomination 398 for this year has been used since the early medieval period, when the Anno Domini calendar era became the prevalent method in Europe for naming years.

== Events ==
=== By place ===
==== Roman Empire ====
- Revolt of Alaric I: After Stilicho returns to Italy, the Eastern Roman Empire concludes a peace treaty with Alaric. The Visigoths are given a settlement area in Illyricum and their king is appointed magister militum per Illyricum.
- Gildonic Revolt: Gildo, a Berber serving as a high-ranking official (comes) in Mauretania, rebels against the Western Roman Empire. The Gildonic Revolt is instigated by a powerful official in the Eastern Roman Empire named Eutropius, who wishes to undermine his enemies in the Western Roman Empire by cutting off the grain supply to Rome. After Gildo takes much of North Africa and cuts off the grain supply to Rome, Flavius Stilicho returns to Italy to raise troops against the rebels. After a short campaign in the desert, he defeats Gildo. Gildo flees and commits suicide by hanging himself.
- Eutropius, Roman general (magister militum), celebrates his victory over the Huns ("the wolves of the North") in a parade through Constantinople (see 395).
- An imperial edict obliges Roman landowners with plantations to yield 1/3 of their fields to the "barbarians" who have been settled in the Roman Empire.
- Emperor Honorius marries Stilicho's daughter Maria.
- Possible date for the Second Pictish War.

=== By topic ===
==== Religion ====
- John Chrysostom, Archbishop of Constantinople, receives a delegation of clergy who want to close the pagan temples at Gaza (Palestine) where worshippers are openly defying the law. John works through the eunuch Eutropius, who has great power over emperor Arcadius, and within a week an imperial Constitution is issued closing the Roman temples, but the official appointed to execute this order is bribed.
- Augustine of Hippo completes his Confessions, an autobiography that recounts his intellectual and spiritual development.

== Births ==
- Fan Ye, Chinese historian (d. 445)

== Deaths ==
- May 27 – Murong Bao, emperor of the Xianbei state Later Yan (b. 355)
- August 15 – Lan Han, official of the Xianbei state Lan Yan
- Didymus the Blind, Alexandrian theologian
- Gildo, Moorish prince and comes Africae (governor)
- Murong Lin, Chinese prince of the Xianbei state Later Yan
- Murong Nong, Chinese prince of the Xianbei state Later Yan
- Nectarius, archbishop of Constantinople
