= 351 =

351 in various calendars
- Gregorian calendar: 351; CCCLI
- Ab urbe condita: 1104
- Assyrian calendar: 5101
- Balinese saka calendar: 272–273
- Bengali calendar: −243 – −242
- Berber calendar: 1301
- Buddhist calendar: 895
- Burmese calendar: −287
- Byzantine calendar: 5859–5860
- Chinese calendar: 庚戌年 (Metal Dog); 3048 or 2841 — to — 辛亥年 (Metal Pig); 3049 or 2842
- Coptic calendar: 67–68
- Discordian calendar: 1517
- Ethiopian calendar: 343–344
- Hebrew calendar: 4111–4112
- Hindu calendars
- Vikram Samvat: 407–408
- Shaka Samvat: 272–273
- Kali Yuga: 3451–3452
- Holocene calendar: 10351
- Iranian calendar: 271 BP – 270 BP
- Islamic calendar: 279 BH – 278 BH
- Javanese calendar: 233–234
- Julian calendar: 351; CCCLI
- Korean calendar: 2684
- Minguo calendar: 1561 before ROC 民前1561年
- Nanakshahi calendar: −1117
- Seleucid era: 662/663 AG
- Thai solar calendar: 893–894
- Tibetan calendar: ལྕགས་ཕོ་ཁྱི་ལོ་ (male Iron-Dog); 477 or 96 or −676 — to — ལྕགས་མོ་ཕག་ལོ་ (female Iron-Boar); 478 or 97 or −675

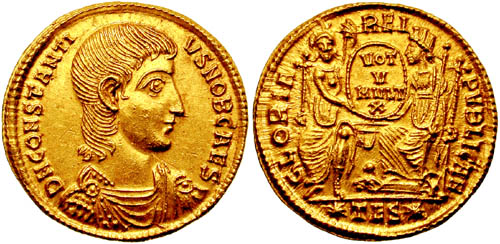
Constantius Gallus (r. 351–354)

Year 351 (CCCLI) was a common year starting on Tuesday of the Julian calendar. At the time, it was known in Rome as the Year of the Consulship of Magnentius and Gaiso (or, less frequently, year 1104 Ab urbe condita). The denomination 351 for this year has been used since the early medieval period, when the Anno Domini calendar era became the prevalent method in Europe for naming years.

== Events ==
=== By place ===
==== Roman Empire ====
- March 15 – Emperor Constantius II elevates his 25-year-old cousin Constantius Gallus to Caesar at Sirmium (Pannonia). He arranges a marriage with his sister Constantina, and puts him in charge of the Eastern portion of the Roman Empire.
- Constantius II marches West with a large field army (around 60,000 men) to topple Magnus Magnentius in Pannonia.
- May 7 – The Jewish revolt against Constantius Gallus breaks out. After his arrival at Antioch, the Jews begin a rebellion in Palestine. The Roman garrison in the town of Diocesarea is wiped out.
- September 28 – Battle of Mursa Major: Constantius II defeats the usurper Magnentius along the valley of the Drava. The battle is one of the bloodiest in Roman military history. During the fighting Marcellinus, a general of Magnentius is killed; Magnentius himself survives.
- Winter – Magnentius flees to Aquileia in northern Italy and fortifies the mountain passes in the Alps.

==== China ====
- Emperor Shi Zhi, last ruler of the Later Zhao dynasty, is killed by Ran Min's forces, an action that sets the stage for Wei's victory in the Ran Wei–Later Zhao war.
- Fú Jiàn, an ethnic Di, declares himself "Heavenly Prince" (Tian Wang) during the collapse of Later Zhao, and establishes Former Qin.

=== By topic ===
==== Art and Science ====
- In India, a new process makes possible the extraction of sugar from sugarcane.

==== Religion ====
- Macedonius is restored as Patriarch of Constantinople.

== Births ==
- Princess Dowager Helan, mother of Wei Daowudi (d. 396)
- Li Gao, Chinese general of the state Western Liang (d. 417)

== Deaths ==
- September 28 – Flavius Romulus, Roman consul
- Marcellinus, Roman general (magister officiorum)
- Shi Zhi, Chinese prince and emperor of Later Zhao
