= Empress Murong =

Empress Murong (慕容皇后, personal name unknown), formally Empress Daowu (道武皇后), was an empress of the Xianbei-led Northern Wei dynasty of China. Her husband was the founding emperor Emperor Daowu (Tuoba Gui).

She was the youngest daughter of the Later Yan emperor Murong Bao (Emperor Huimin). When Northern Wei launched a major attack against Later Yan in 396, causing Murong Bao to abandon the capital Zhongshan (中山, in modern Baoding, Hebei) in 397, she was unable to follow her father in flight, and when Zhongshan fell to Northern Wei later that year, she was captured by Tuoba Gui and made one of his consorts. In 400, after he had declared imperial title, he considered whom to create empress. He had favored Consort Liu, the daughter of the Xiongnu chief Liu Toujuan (劉頭眷) the most, and she also bore his oldest son Tuoba Si. However, the Tuoba Tribe's traditions dictated that when the ruler were to consider whom to make his wife, he was to make the candidates try to forge golden statues by hand, as a way of discerning divine favor. Consort Liu was unable to forge a golden statue, while Consort Murong was able to, and so was created empress. Her mother Lady Meng, also captured by Northern Wei, was created the Lady of Piaoyang.

Nothing more is known about Empress Murong. She was implied to be still alive in 402, when Later Qin's emperor Yao Xing rejected Emperor Daowu's overture to marry one of his daughters, because Yao Xing's refusal was based on his information that Emperor Daowu already had Empress Murong as empress.

Chinese royalty
Preceded by None (dynasty founded)	Empress of Northern Wei; 400–409?	Succeeded by Empress Helian
Preceded by Empress Yang of Former Qin	Empress of China (Inner Mongolia); 400–409?	Succeeded by Empress Helian
Preceded by Empress Duan of Later Yan	Empress of China (Shanxi/Hebei); 400–409?	Succeeded by Empress Helian
Preceded by Empress Duan Jifei of Southern Yan	Empress of China (Huatai region); 400–409?	Succeeded by Empress Helian
