= 289 =

289 in various calendars
| Gregorian calendar | 289; CCLXXXIX |
| Ab urbe condita | 1042 |
| Assyrian calendar | 5039 |
| Balinese saka calendar | 210–211 |
| Bengali calendar | −305 – −304 |
| Berber calendar | 1239 |
| Buddhist calendar | 833 |
| Burmese calendar | −349 |
| Byzantine calendar | 5797–5798 |
| Chinese calendar | 戊申年 (Earth Monkey); 2986 or 2779 — to — 己酉年 (Earth Rooster); 2987 or 2780 |
| Coptic calendar | 5–6 |
| Discordian calendar | 1455 |
| Ethiopian calendar | 281–282 |
| Hebrew calendar | 4049–4050 |
- Hindu calendars
| Vikram Samvat | 345–346 |
| Shaka Samvat | 210–211 |
| Kali Yuga | 3389–3390 |
| Holocene calendar | 10289 |
| Iranian calendar | 333 BP – 332 BP |
| Islamic calendar | 343 BH – 342 BH |
| Javanese calendar | 169–170 |
| Julian calendar | 289; CCLXXXIX |
| Korean calendar | 2622 |
| Minguo calendar | 1623 before ROC 民前1623年 |
| Nanakshahi calendar | −1179 |
| Seleucid era | 600/601 AG |
| Thai solar calendar | 831–832 |
| Tibetan calendar | ས་ཕོ་སྤྲེ་ལོ་ (male Earth-Monkey); 415 or 34 or −738 — to — ས་མོ་བྱ་ལོ་ (female Earth-Bird); 416 or 35 or −737 |

Year 289 (CCLXXXIX) was a common year starting on Tuesday of the Julian calendar. At the time, it was known as the Year of the Consulship of Bassus and Quintianus (or, less frequently, year 1042 Ab urbe condita). The denomination 289 for this year has been used since the early medieval period, when the Anno Domini calendar era became the prevalent method in Europe for naming years.

== Events ==
=== By place ===
==== Roman Empire ====
- In this or the following year, Emperor Diocletian campaigns with success against the Sarmatians. The future emperor Galerius may have distinguished himself during this campaign.
- In this or the following year, Maximian attempts to reconquer Britain from the usurper Carausius but is defeated at sea.

== Births ==
- Flavia Maxima Fausta, Roman empress (d. 326)
- Yu Liang (or Yuangui), Chinese politician (d. 340)

== Deaths ==
- Alexander of Rome, Christian martyr
- Kyriaki the Great, Christian martyr
- Xun Xu (or Gongzeng), Chinese official
