= 445 =

445 in various calendars
| Gregorian calendar | 445; CDXLV |
| Ab urbe condita | 1198 |
| Assyrian calendar | 5195 |
| Balinese saka calendar | 366–367 |
| Bengali calendar | −149 – −148 |
| Berber calendar | 1395 |
| Buddhist calendar | 989 |
| Burmese calendar | −193 |
| Byzantine calendar | 5953–5954 |
| Chinese calendar | 甲申年 (Wood Monkey); 3142 or 2935 — to — 乙酉年 (Wood Rooster); 3143 or 2936 |
| Coptic calendar | 161–162 |
| Discordian calendar | 1611 |
| Ethiopian calendar | 437–438 |
| Hebrew calendar | 4205–4206 |
- Hindu calendars
| Vikram Samvat | 501–502 |
| Shaka Samvat | 366–367 |
| Kali Yuga | 3545–3546 |
| Holocene calendar | 10445 |
| Iranian calendar | 177 BP – 176 BP |
| Islamic calendar | 182 BH – 181 BH |
| Javanese calendar | 329–330 |
| Julian calendar | 445; CDXLV |
| Korean calendar | 2778 |
| Minguo calendar | 1467 before ROC 民前1467年 |
| Nanakshahi calendar | −1023 |
| Seleucid era | 756/757 AG |
| Thai solar calendar | 987–988 |
| Tibetan calendar | ཤིང་ཕོ་སྤྲེ་ལོ་ (male Wood-Monkey); 571 or 190 or −582 — to — ཤིང་མོ་བྱ་ལོ་ (female Wood-Bird); 572 or 191 or −581 |

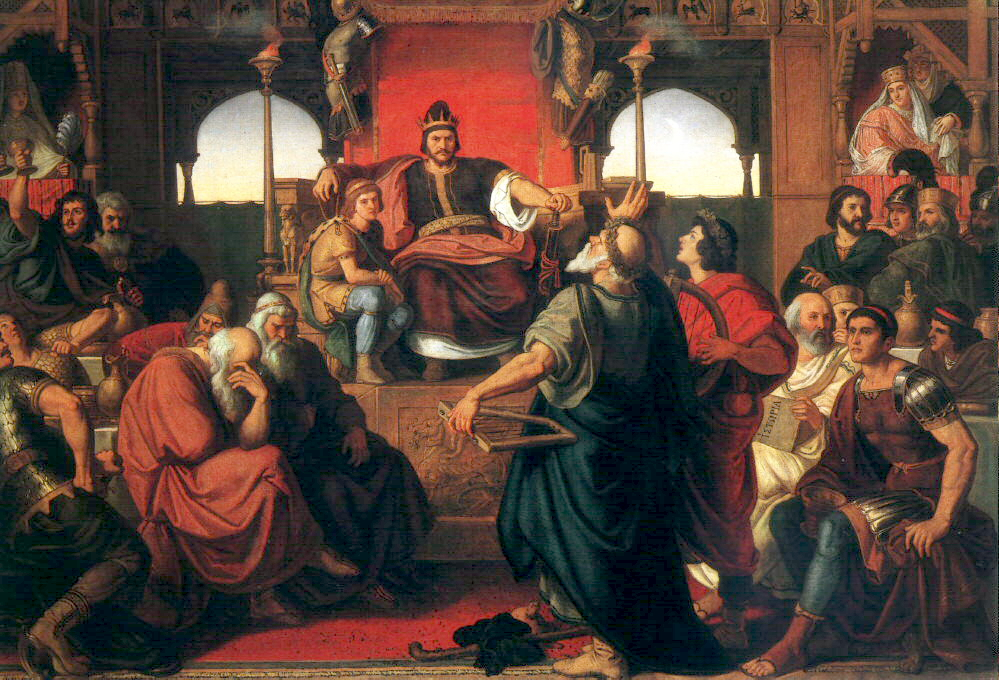
The Feast of Attila, by Mór Than (1870)

Year 445 (CDXLV) was a common year starting on Monday of the Julian calendar. At the time, it was known as the Year of the Consulship of Valentinianus and Nomus (or, less frequently, year 1198 Ab urbe condita). The denomination 445 for this year has been used since the early medieval period, when the Anno Domini calendar era became the prevalent method in Europe for naming years.

== Events ==
=== By place ===
==== Europe ====
- Roman emperor Valentinian III issues Novel 18 (Novella XVIII) on June 19, an imperial edict against Manichaeism. Heavy penalties are decreed against those who do not denounce the religion, and retain Manichaean books.
- Petronius Maximus, prominent aristocrat, is given the title of Patrician. He becomes the most honored of all non-imperial Romans, and political rival of Flavius Aetius.
- Bleda, co-ruler of the Huns, dies in a hunting accident. He is possibly murdered at the instigation of his younger brother Attila, with whom he has ruled since 434. Now about 39, Attila takes the throne for himself, and becomes king of the Hunnic Empire.

=== By topic ===
==== Religion ====
- Domnus II, Patriarch of Antioch, summons a synod of Syrian bishops to confirm the deposition of Athanasius of Perrha.
- Ireland: The Diocese of Armagh is created.
- Valentinian III issued Novel 17 (Novella XVII) on July 8. It was an imperial edict recognizing papal authority in the Western Roman Empire.

== Deaths ==
- Arsenius the Great, Desert Father
- King Bleda of the Huns (approximate date)
- Fan Ye, Chinese historian (b. 398)
- Nath Í mac Fiachrach, High King of Ireland
