= 362 =

362 in various calendars
Gregorian calendar	362; CCCLXII
Ab urbe condita	1115
Assyrian calendar	5112
Balinese saka calendar	283–284
Bengali calendar	−232 – −231
Berber calendar	1312
Buddhist calendar	906
Burmese calendar	−276
Byzantine calendar	5870–5871
Chinese calendar	辛酉年 (Metal Rooster); 3059 or 2852 — to — 壬戌年 (Water Dog); 3060 or 2853
Coptic calendar	78–79
Discordian calendar	1528
Ethiopian calendar	354–355
Hebrew calendar	4122–4123
- Hindu calendars
Vikram Samvat	418–419
Shaka Samvat	283–284
Kali Yuga	3462–3463
Holocene calendar	10362
Iranian calendar	260 BP – 259 BP
Islamic calendar	268 BH – 267 BH
Javanese calendar	244–245
Julian calendar	362; CCCLXII
Korean calendar	2695
Minguo calendar	1550 before ROC 民前1550年
Nanakshahi calendar	−1106
Seleucid era	673/674 AG
Thai solar calendar	904–905
Tibetan calendar	ལྕགས་མོ་བྱ་ལོ་ (female Iron-Bird); 488 or 107 or −665 — to — ཆུ་ཕོ་ཁྱི་ལོ་ (male Water-Dog); 489 or 108 or −664

Year 362 (CCCLXII) was a common year starting on Tuesday of the Julian calendar. At the time, it was known as the Year of the Consulship of Mamertinus and Nevitta (or, less frequently, year 1115 Ab urbe condita). The denomination 362 for this year has been used since the early medieval period, when the Anno Domini calendar era became the prevalent method in Europe for naming years.

== Events ==
=== By place ===
==== Roman Empire ====
- July 18 – Emperor Julian arrives at Antioch with an expeditionary force (60,000 men), and stays there for nine months, to launch a campaign against the Persian Empire. He secures the co-operation of King Arsaces of Armenia, who fights a bloody guerrilla war against the Persians.
- Julian builds a fleet of 50 warships, and more than 1,000 transport boats at Samosata, for his expedition in Persia against King Shapur II the Great.
- An earthquake strikes Nicaea (Turkey).
- An earthquake strikes Al-Karak (Jordan).

=== By topic ===
==== Religion ====
- February 21 – Athanasius returns to Alexandria and convenes a council, at which he appeals for unity among Christians who differ in terminology, but Emperor Julian orders Athanasius to leave Alexandria. He will remain in exile in Upper Egypt, until after Julian's death the next year.
- October 22 – The temple of Apollo at Daphne, outside Antioch, is destroyed in a mysterious fire.

== Births ==
- Flavia Maxima Constantia, daughter of Constantius II (approximate date)
- Mesrop Mashtots, Armenian linguist (d. 440)
- Jin Xiaowudi, emperor of the Eastern Jin Dynasty (d. 396)

== Deaths ==
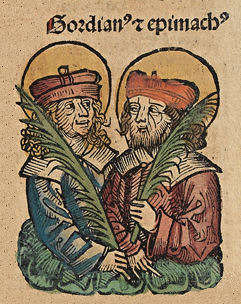
Saints Gordianus and Epimachus

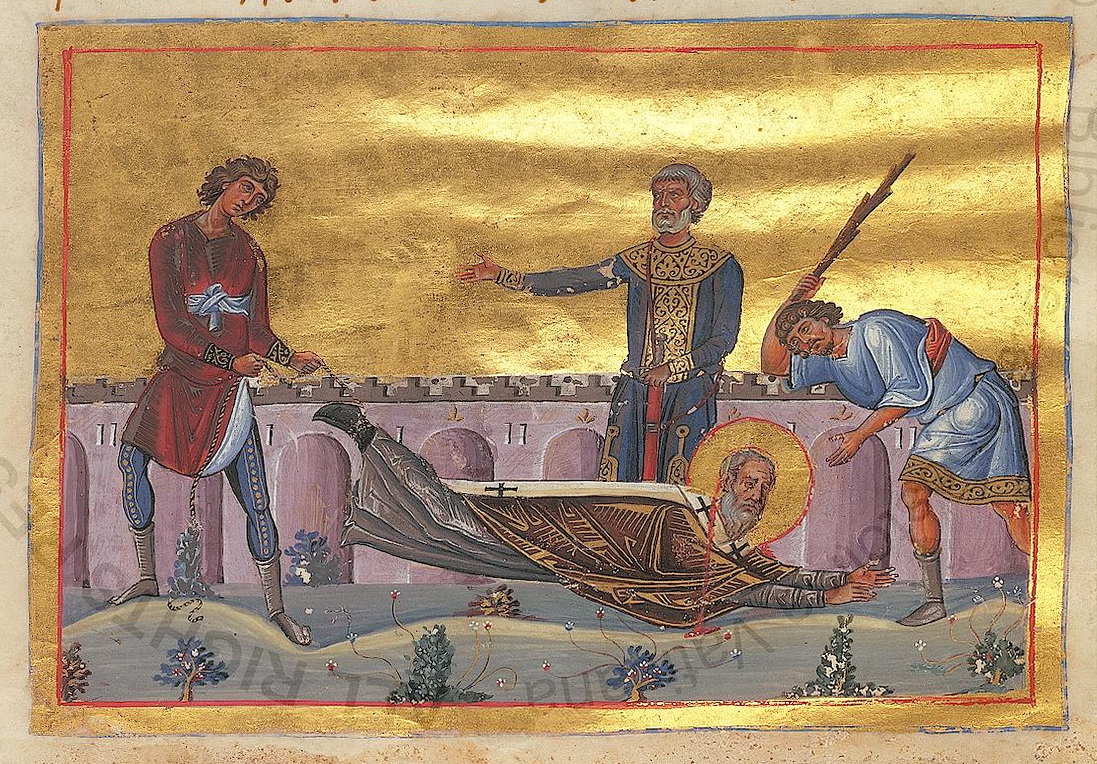
Saint Dorotheus of Tyre

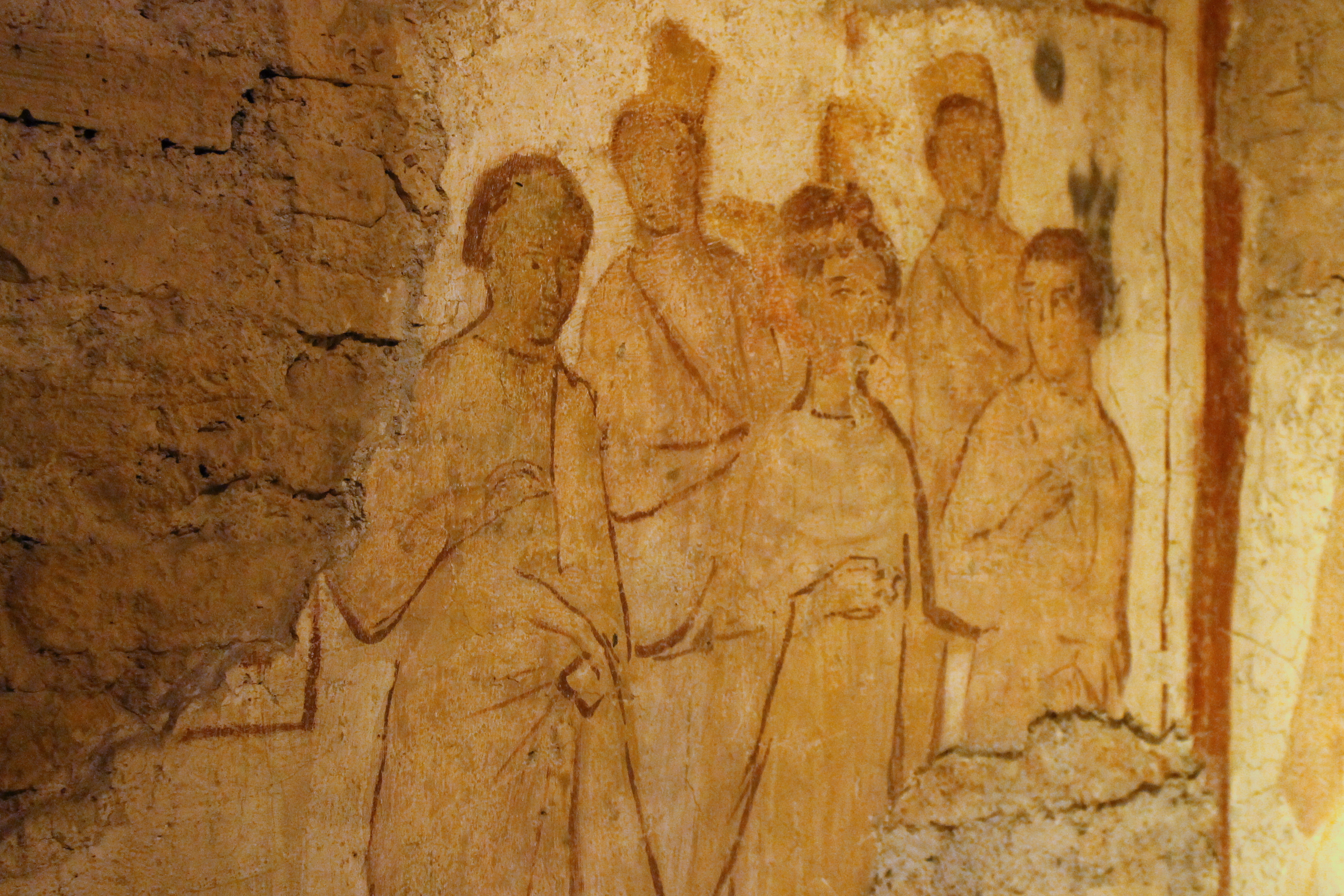
Saint Crispus, Crispinianus, and Benedicta

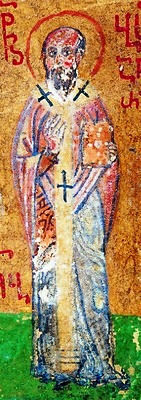
Saint Basil of Ancyra

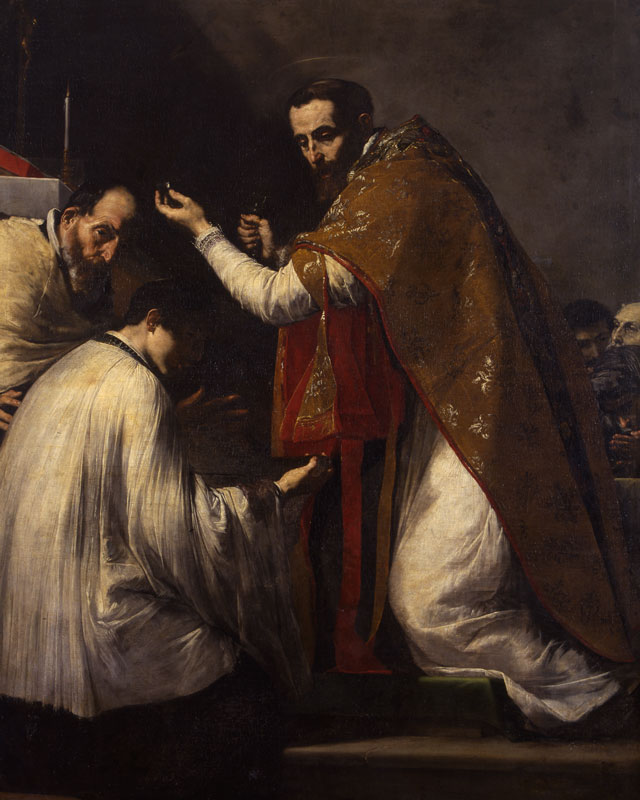
Saint Donatus of Arezzo

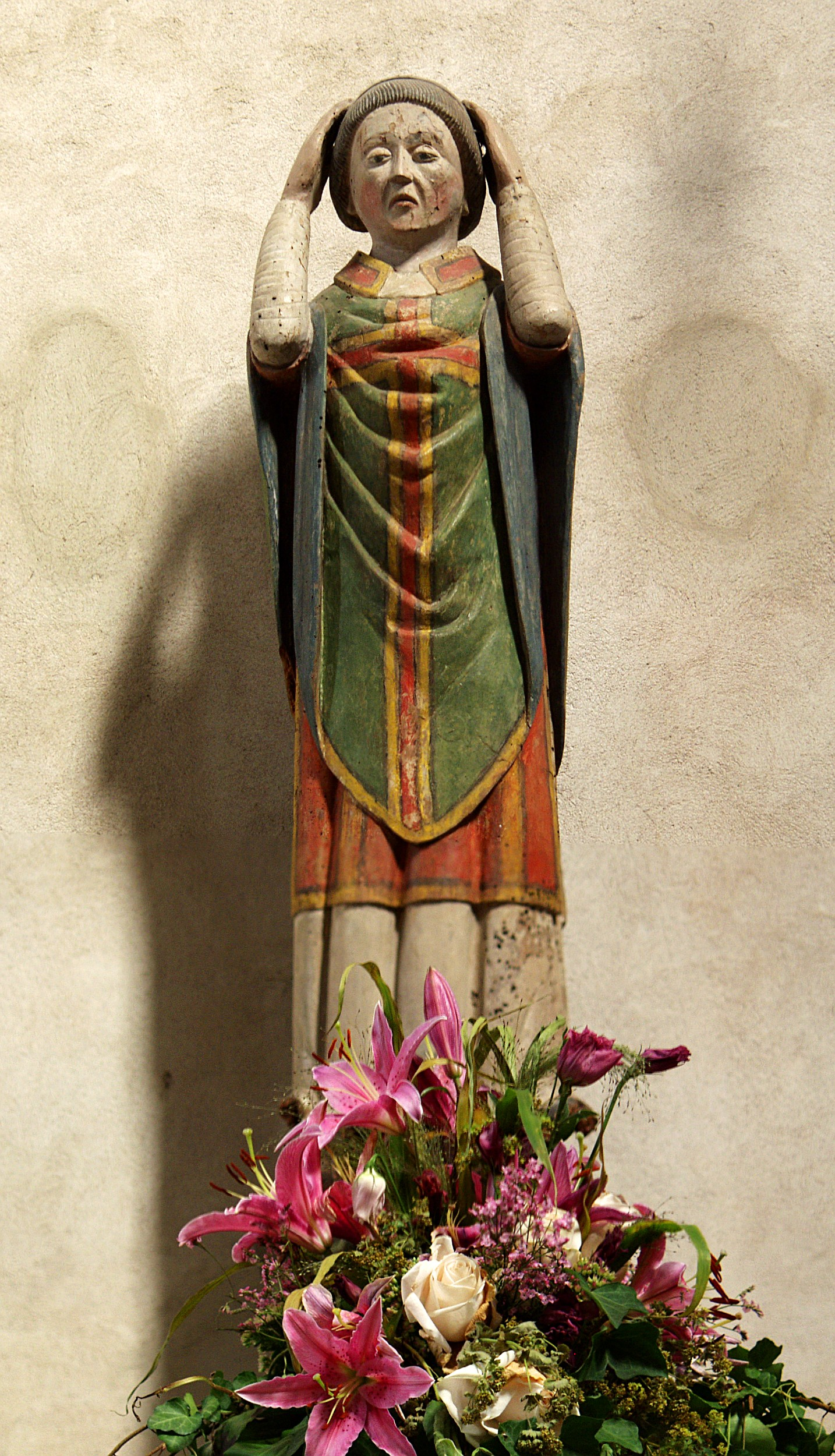
Saint Eliphius

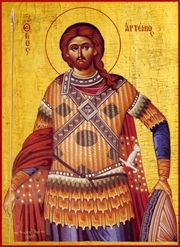
Saint Artemis

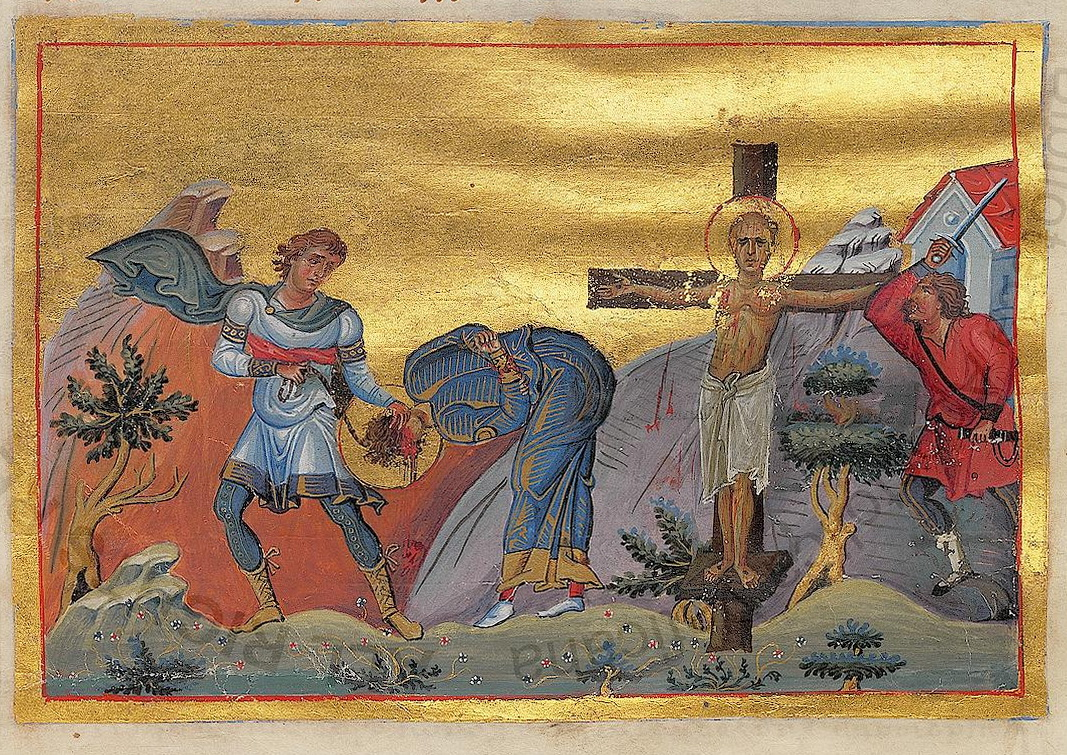
Saint Gemellus of Ancyra

- January 1 – Paulus Catena, Roman politician
- February 25 – Reginos, Greek Orthodox bishop and saint
- May 10 – Gordianus and Epimachus, Roman Catholic priests, martyrs and saints
- June 5 – Dorotheus of Tyre, Roman Catholic bishop and martyr (b. 255)
- June 27 – Crispus, Crispinianus, and Benedicta, Roman Catholic, priests, martyrs and saints
- June 28 – Basil of Ancyra, Byzantine Orthodox bishop and saint
- August 5 – Eusignius of Antioch, Byzantine Orthodox bishop and martyr (b. 252)
- August 7 – Donatus of Arezzo, Roman Catholic bishop and saint
- October 16 – Eliphius, Roman Catholic priest and saint
- October 20
  - Artemius, Egyptian Orthodox martyr and saint
  - Theodoret of Antioch, Syrian Christian priest and martyr
- December 10 – Gemellus of Ancyra, Byzantine Orthodox bishop and saint

=== Date unknown ===
- Princess Dowager Ma, concubine of Zhang Jun
