= 326 =

326 in various calendars
- Gregorian calendar: 326; CCCXXVI
- Ab urbe condita: 1079
- Assyrian calendar: 5076
- Balinese saka calendar: 247–248
- Bengali calendar: −268 – −267
- Berber calendar: 1276
- Buddhist calendar: 870
- Burmese calendar: −312
- Byzantine calendar: 5834–5835
- Chinese calendar: 乙酉年 (Wood Rooster); 3023 or 2816 — to — 丙戌年 (Fire Dog); 3024 or 2817
- Coptic calendar: 42–43
- Discordian calendar: 1492
- Ethiopian calendar: 318–319
- Hebrew calendar: 4086–4087
- Hindu calendars
- Vikram Samvat: 382–383
- Shaka Samvat: 247–248
- Kali Yuga: 3426–3427
- Holocene calendar: 10326
- Iranian calendar: 296 BP – 295 BP
- Islamic calendar: 305 BH – 304 BH
- Javanese calendar: 207–208
- Julian calendar: 326; CCCXXVI
- Korean calendar: 2659
- Minguo calendar: 1586 before ROC 民前1586年
- Nanakshahi calendar: −1142
- Seleucid era: 637/638 AG
- Thai solar calendar: 868–869
- Tibetan calendar: ཤིང་མོ་བྱ་ལོ་ (female Wood-Bird); 452 or 71 or −701 — to — མེ་ཕོ་ཁྱི་ལོ་ (male Fire-Dog); 453 or 72 or −700

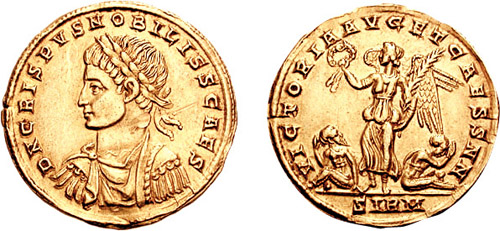
Coin of Crispus Caesar (c. 303–326)

Year 326 (CCCXXVI) was a common year starting on Saturday of the Julian calendar. At the time, it was known as the Year of the Consulship of Constantinus and Constantinus (or, less frequently, year 1079 Ab urbe condita). The denomination 326 for this year has been used since the early medieval period, when the Anno Domini calendar era became the prevalent method in Europe for naming years.

== Events ==
=== By place ===
==== Roman Empire ====
- Emperor Constantine the Great travels to Rome to celebrate the 20th anniversary of his accession to power, but while en route at Pola he orders his older son, Crispus Caesar, to be executed, possibly on charges of adultery. Later, Fausta, second wife of Constantine I, is also executed by being suffocated or boiled in a hot bath.

=== By topic ===
==== Religion ====
- September 14 (traditional date) – Helena, mother of Constantine I, discovers the so-called True Cross and the Holy Sepulchre (Jesus's tomb) in Jerusalem. On her pilgrimage, which begins about this year, she pauses on the Aegean island of Patmos, where she is said to found the church of Panagia Ekatontapiliani.
- Helena tells Constantine that he must atone for executing his son and wife by building churches, and at about this date construction begins on Old St. Peter's Basilica, the first church on the traditional site of Saint Peter's tomb in Rome, and on the basilica of Golgotha on Calvary outside Jerusalem. He also commissions construction of the Church of the Nativity in Bethlehem (dedicated 339).
- Christianity is introduced to the Kingdom of Iberia (modern-day Georgia) by Saint Nino (approximate date).

== Births ==
- Constantius Gallus, Roman consul and statesman (d. 354)
- Murong Chui (or Daoming), Chinese general (d. 396)
- Procopius, Roman general and usurper (executed 366) (approximate date)

== Deaths ==
- Flavius Julius Crispus, son of Constantine I (b. 303)
- Flavia Maxima Fausta, Roman empress (b. 289)
- Licinius II, Roman consul and caesar (b. 315)
- Liu (or Xianlie), Chinese empress of Han Zhao
