= Revolt of Alaric I =

Military conflict with the Roman Empire (395–398 CE)

- Part of the Fall of the Western Roman Empire
- The Roman Empire in 395
Date	395–398
Location	Praetorian prefecture of Illyricum
Result	Status quo ante

Belligerents
Alaric's rebels	Western Roman Empire	Eastern Roman Empire

Commanders and leaders
Alaric I Athaulf	Stilicho	Rufinus; Eutropius; Gainas

Strength
± 20,000	± 15,000	Unknown

The revolt of Alaric I was a military conflict between the Roman Empire and a rebel army, probably composed mainly of Goths. This war concerns a number of armed conflicts in the period between 395 and 398, interspersed with periods of negotiations and sometimes even cooperation. During this war, the western and eastern parts of the Roman Empire did not always join together because of conflicting interests. The protagonists in this conflict were the West-Roman commander-in-chief Stilicho, the Eastern-Roman prefect Rufinus, his successor Eutropius and Alaric I. The latter was an elected Gothic military leader and monarch, and later considered one of first Visigothic kings.

== Sources ==
The main contemporary sources in which this war is reported are the historian Orosius and the poet Claudianus. Other early sources are Zosimus, a historian who probably lived about half a century after Alaric's death, and Jordanes, a Romanized Goth who wrote a history of his people around 550. These sources provide a lot of information, but are not always unambiguous and sometimes even contradictory.

== Background ==
=== Settlement of the Goths within the empire ===
In 376 the Goths, who were fleeing for the Huns, were given permission from Emperor Valens (364-378) to settle within the Roman Empire. The Goths appeared in two large separate groups, the Tervingi and Greuthungi, each with their own leaders. These first two groups were soon followed by even more Gothic refugees. Emperor Valens who had a serious shortage of manpower for his armies saw in the newcomers a new source of soldiers and concluded treaties with the Goths. In exchange for military assistance, the Goths were assigned territory within the empire. This was an extraordinary circumstance, because for the first time in the history of the empire barbaric people were settled within its borders and not directly subjected to imperial laws. In the reception and integration of these groups, a lot went wrong due to mismanagement and miscommunication of the Romans. Over the next decades, more Gothic groups crossed the Roman borders; these generally tried to enlist with the Roman military or gain lands to settle. Many newcomers tried to integrate into Roman society, but other Gothic groups attempted to maintain cohesion as well as gain greater power in negotiations by practicing distinct customs including an elected kingship.

The arrival of the Goths and the inability of the Romans to overcome the threat that the newcomers made for the empire after some time, eventually led to a serious weakening of the military strength of the empire, and worked as a catalyst for the fall of the Western Roman empire in 476-480.

=== Usurpation of Eugenius ===
An important occasion in which the Goths had to provide the empire with soldiers, arose during the usurpation of Eugenius in the year 392. Emperor Theodosius (379-395) brought an army together in 393 that a significant contingent includes of Gothic auxiliary troops. These Goths were under the command of their own captains, of which Alaric was the most important. The supremacy over the empire was decided in 394 in the Battle of the Frigidus in favor of Theodosius. His Goths played an important role during the battles but also suffered major losses. The contemporary Roman historian Orosius stated that, since the Goths suffered most of the victims, Theodosius won two battles with Frigidus, one against Eugenius the other against the Goths.

=== Dispute over Illyricum ===
Theodosius I died the year after the battle. His death on January 17, 395 caused the division of the empire among his two sons: the ten-year-old Honorius ruled over the western half and Arcadius, eighteen, over the eastern half. Due to the young age and low predisposition of both brothers, they were under the influence of prominent personalities. In the case of Honorius, the magister militum Stilicho and in that of Arcadius the Praefectus praetorio Rufinus.

There was a dispute between the two parts of the empire over the ownership of the prefecture of Illyricum. This prefecture was assigned to the west in 364 when the empire was divided between the brothers Valentinian and Valens. Later at the time of the war against the Goths in 379-382, the then emperor Gratianus handed it to Theodosius to facilitate his fight against the Goths. After the death of Theodosius, the western half demanded it back, something the eastern half rejected. The background of this dispute went beyond mere territorial importance, as the region was the empire's main recruitment area for soldiers.

== The revolt ==
=== The rebel Army ===
The great losses suffered in the battle of the Frigidus fed the Goths' mistrust of the Romans. As Emperor Theodosius died in early 395, the Goths were ripe to revolt. The Goths had had enough of their semi-autonomous status within the empire and the Tervingi and Greuthungi sought rapprochement with each other. Now that the empire was divided between the two sons of the emperor, the Goths, who were settled as foederati in Moesia in the eastern part of the empire, were loyal to Arcadius. They demanded more security from him and chose Alaric, who had made a name for himself in an earlier, smaller uprising after the Maximus campaign - who also aspired to an important position within the Roman army - as their king. Though Alaric was a member of the Balt dynasty, a Gothic royal family, his relation to previous Gothic leaders like Athanaric remains unclear. In any case, he had distinguished himself as leader and gained the appointment as a Roman comes rei militaris, though he was evidently dissatisfied with this position. Alaric's personal grievance only grew when the emperor put him under the command of Gainas. The latter was also a Goth, but of lesser social origin than Alaric in the eyes of many Goths.

In the course of 395, a revolt of the Goths broke out in Moesia. As ancient sources remain vague as to the exact composition of the emerging rebel army, historians continue to dispute whether it was mainly recruited from Gothic settlers or composed of a mixed force of disgruntled veterans of the Frigidus campaign. Proponents of an ethnically mixed uprising point out that many armed, disgruntled groups were known to operate in the Balkans at the time, several of whom were either Roman or non-Gothic Barbarians. It would have made sense of these groups to unite due to their shared interest in land and compensation. Critics of this theory point out that, if the Goths were a minority in the rebellion, the rebels would have probably lost their Gothic identity over time; however, this was not the case. Historians such as Ian Hughes and Herwig Wolfram have instead argued that most of the insurgents were probably Goths, though ones of various backgrounds. As the rebel army then marched across the Roman Empire, it absorbed a great number of volunteers and stragglers of non-Gothic origin. However, these remained a minority, thus maintaining the self-identification of the rebels as "Goths". Hughes further posited that Jordanes' description of "Gothi Minores ('Lesser Goths')" in the Balkans suggests a division of the Goths in 395: A large number of Goths in Moesia revolted under Alaric, while the rest refused to join the uprising and thus became the Gothi Minores.

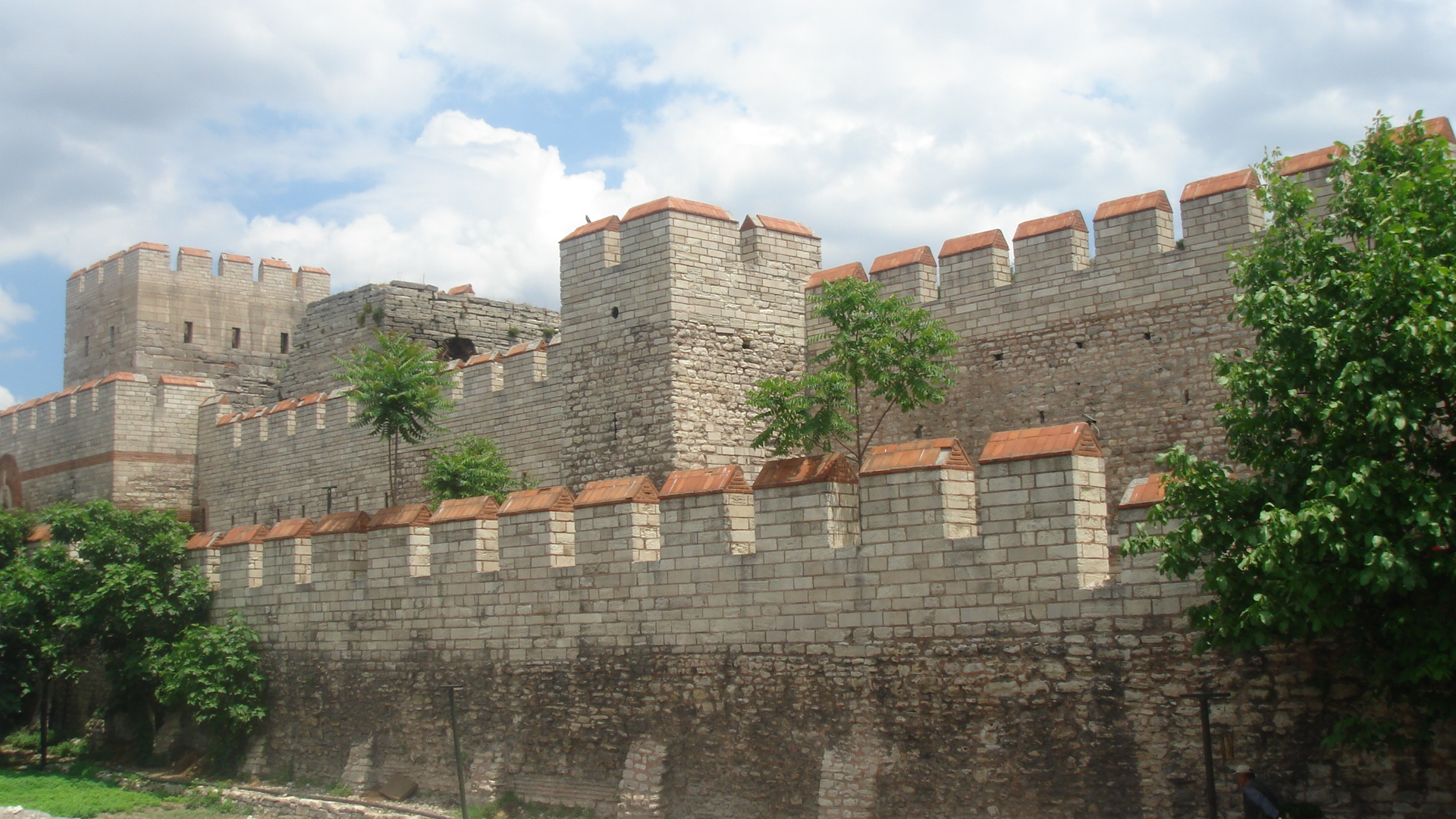
Theodosian Walls at the Selymbria Gate in Istanbul.

=== Attack on Constantinople ===
Once the rebels had gathered under the leadership of Alaric, they set off for the imperial capital Constantinople. In their wake they caused great damage, but encountering no significant opposition from the Roman army. The eastern field army was at a distance in Asia Minor where it was engaged in fighting groups of plundering Huns and many eastern troops who had not yet returned after the campaign against Eutropius stayed in Italy. Nevertheless, at that time it was an impossible task for the Goths to take the capital of the East Roman Empire. The emperor stayed safely in his palace behind the strong walls. Alaric contacted Rufinus with whom he negotiated. After commitments from Rufinus, the Pretorian prefect of the East, and chief adviser to Arcadius, the siege of Constantinople was lifted and the Goths moved further west.

According to historian Thomas Burns, the negotiations with Rufinus meant that Alaric and his men were recruited by the Eastern regime of Rufinus in Constantinople and sent to Thessaly to ward off the imminent threat of Western General Stilicho. This general set out, with an army from Italy, to defeat the Gothic uprising in Greece.

Alaric's march in 395 included passing the mountain pass Thermopylae. His troops went to Athens and along the coast. Stilicho's propagandist Claudianus accused Alaric's army of looting carried out far south of the mountainous peninsula Peloponnese, reporting that only Stilicho's surprise attack with his western field army (that he had sailed from Italy) put an end to the looting when his forces drove Alaric's troops northward into Epirus. Zosimus adds that Stilicho's troops also destroyed and looted, and that he allowed Alaric's men to escape with their loot.

=== First campaign of Stilicho and the murder of Rufinus ===
With the arrival of Stilicho in the fall of 395, the issue regarding the jurisdiction of the Illyrian prefecture became relevant. Rufinus, the strong man of the east, feared losing this area to the west with a victory of Stilicho over the Goths. He persuaded the emperor to cancel Stilicho's campaign. Emperor Arcadius forbade Stilicho to attack Alaric and demanded that Stilicho's army leave the territory of the Eastern Empire, because the emperor had not asked the Western Roman commander to intervene. In addition, the emperor demanded that Stilicho dismiss any Eastern Roman troops who were serving under his command at the time.

The imperial mandate arrived at the Roman camp when they were preparing an attack on the Goths in the valley of Pinios, an attack that had good prospects to suppress the Gothic uprising. Stilicho - whose wife and son were in Constantinople at the time - responded to this order, but not before he ordered Gainas (captain of the eastern troops) to kill Rufinus. Following the emperor's command, the western army left without even carrying out a combat action against the Goths and the eastern troops returned under the command of Gainas. Upon arrival in Constantinople on 27 November 395, Rufinus was assassinated when he and the emperor inspected the returned troops. His successor was Eutropius, who also had a major influence on the emperor. Zosimus claimed that Arcadius also checked Eutropius 'as if he were a sheep'.

=== Looting of Greece ===
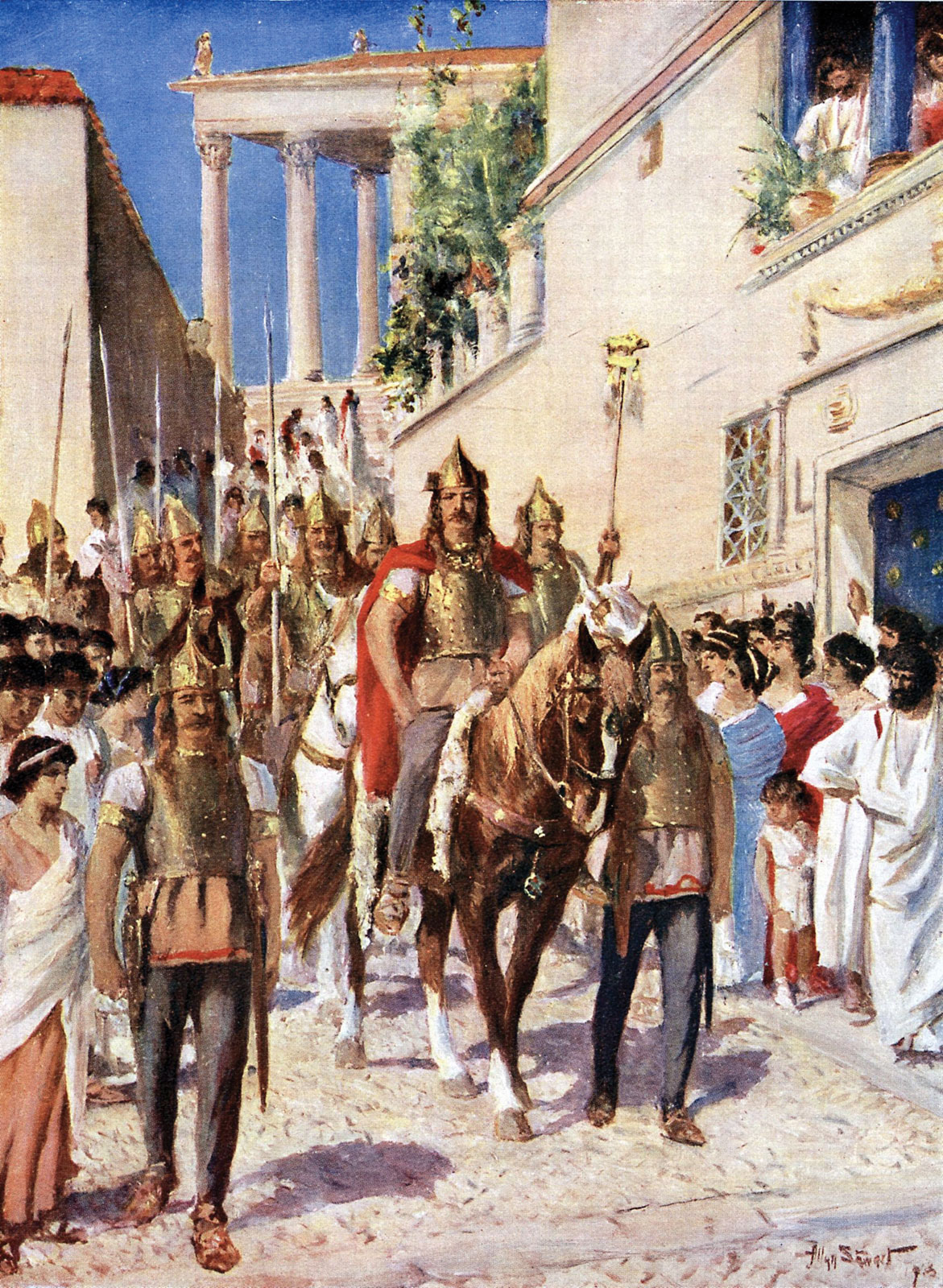
1920s artistic depiction of Alaric parading through Athens after conquering the city in 396

Alaric's army, now without the threat of Stilicho's army, stayed in southern Greece the following year (in 396) without the Eastern Roman government even doing anything against his raids. In the pass of Thermopylae, the Roman troops who were stationed here let the Goths pass without resistance. After this they entered the province Achaea. They plundered the cities of Boeotia and continued to Piraeus, where Athens surrendered and allowed Alaric to move into the city with his army. Then they continued with the fire treasures of Megara, Korinthian, Argos and Sparta. In the end, the new mentor of Emperor Arcadius, Eutropius turned to the west with a request for help. Stilicho seized this opportunity to intervene in the Eastern Empire with both hands.

=== Second campaign of Stilicho ===
Stilicho made his army ready, saved himself a difficult trip over land, and in the spring of 397 he put his troops by boat across the Adriatic Sea and landed in Corinth where the Gothic army of Alaric was located. After a first victorious confrontation, the Romans managed to circle the Gothic army camp, where they were at the mercy of their grace.

Nevertheless, Stilicho waited to hand out the final blow. He kept his power over Alaric as a trump card in the political slit-off between the two parts of the empire that arose when Stilicho decided to pressure the emperor to send Eutropius away and accept him as counsel. Arcadius (i.e., Eutropius) rejected this proposal and ordered Stilicho again to withdraw. This time he refused to follow up on this. The Roman general then was declared as 'public enemy' and all his belongings in the east were taken off of him. Faced with this rejection, Stilicho now chose the defeated Alaric as his new ally. Meanwhile, tensions between the two parts of the empire run up while Stilicho was informed that an uprising had broken out in the western part. In the province Africa the Gildonian uprising had broken out by the Comes Africae Gildo at the instigation of Eutropius. The grain supply of Rome was in danger and at the end of 397 the Roman general decided to return with his army.

Back in Italy, in 398, Stilicho sent an army of 5,000 veterans to Africa to suppress Gildo's uprising. Again he extracts a number of troops from the Rhine border and continued to campaign indecisively against the Eastern Empire. In doing so, he encountered opposition from the Gothic troops of Alaric.

== Aftermath ==
After Stilicho let the Goths go, the Goths stayed in Epirus. Because the Eastern Empire did not have enough manpower to face them alone, the eastern half made a peace agreement with the Goths in 398. In doing so, the Eastern Empire made all kinds of commitments to the Goths and granted them better conditions and additional guarantees of local products. Alaric obtained the title of magister militum per Illyricum, which meant that he held the highest military rank in this province. They also agreed to the settlement of the Goths in the Illyricum prefecture which was disputed with Western Empire. With the prefecture under his control, Alaric was able to impose the cities his will and plunder their arsenals so that he could deliver and improve the weapons of his troops.

This peace agreement was very negative for the western half, as they got the Goths as neighbors in the adjacent Illyricum. The Goths thus obtained a base from which they could easily invade the west. What actually happened from the year 401 and was the prelude to the Gothic War of 402-403.

== Literature ==
Primary sources

- Claudianus
- Orosius, Historiae adversum Paganos, 7.29; 7.42.10–12
- Zosimus, Historia Nova, 5.37; 6.7–11
- Jordanes, The Origins and Deeds of the Goths (On the Origin and Deeds of the Goths), translated by Charles C. Mierow.

Secondary sources

- Bury, J.B. (1889), A History of the Later Roman Empire from Arcadius to Irene, Vol. I
- Bury, J.B. (1923). The History of the Later Roman Empire: from the death of Theodosius I to the death of Justinian (A.D. 395 to A.D. 565). Vol. 1. London: Macmillan.
- Burns, Thomas (1994). Barbarians within the Gates of Rome: A Study of Roman Military Policy and the Barbarians, CA. 375–425 A.D. Bloomington and Indianapolis: Indiana University Press. ISBN 978-0-25331-288-4.
- Collins, Roger (1999). Early Medieval Europe, 300–1000. New York: St. Martin's Press. ISBN 978-0-31221-885-0.
- Wolfram, Herwig (2001). Die Goten und ihre Geschichte [The Goths and their history] (in German). Munich: C.H. Beck. ISBN 3406447791.
- Hughes, Ian (2010). Stilicho. The Vandal who saved Rome. Barnsley: Pen & Sword Military. ISBN 978-1-84415-969-7.
- Blockley, R.C. (1998). "The dynasty of Theodosius". The Cambridge Ancient History. Vol. XIII: the Late Empire AD 337–425. Cambridge University Press. pp. 111–137.
- Heather, Peter (2005). The Fall of the Roman Empire. Oxford and New York: Oxford University Press. ISBN 978-0-19-515954-7.
- J.W.P. Wijnendaele (2017), The Career and 'Revolt' of Gildo, comes et magister utriusque militiae per Africam
- Kulikowski, Michael (2019). The Tragedy of Empire: From Constantine to the Destruction of Roman Italy. Cambridge: The Belknap Press of Harvard University.
- Schreiber, Hermann (1979). De Goten, vorsten en vazalen. Amsterdam-Brussel: H. Meulenhof.
