= Emperor Daowu of Northern Wei =

Emperor Daowu of Northern Wei 北魏道武帝
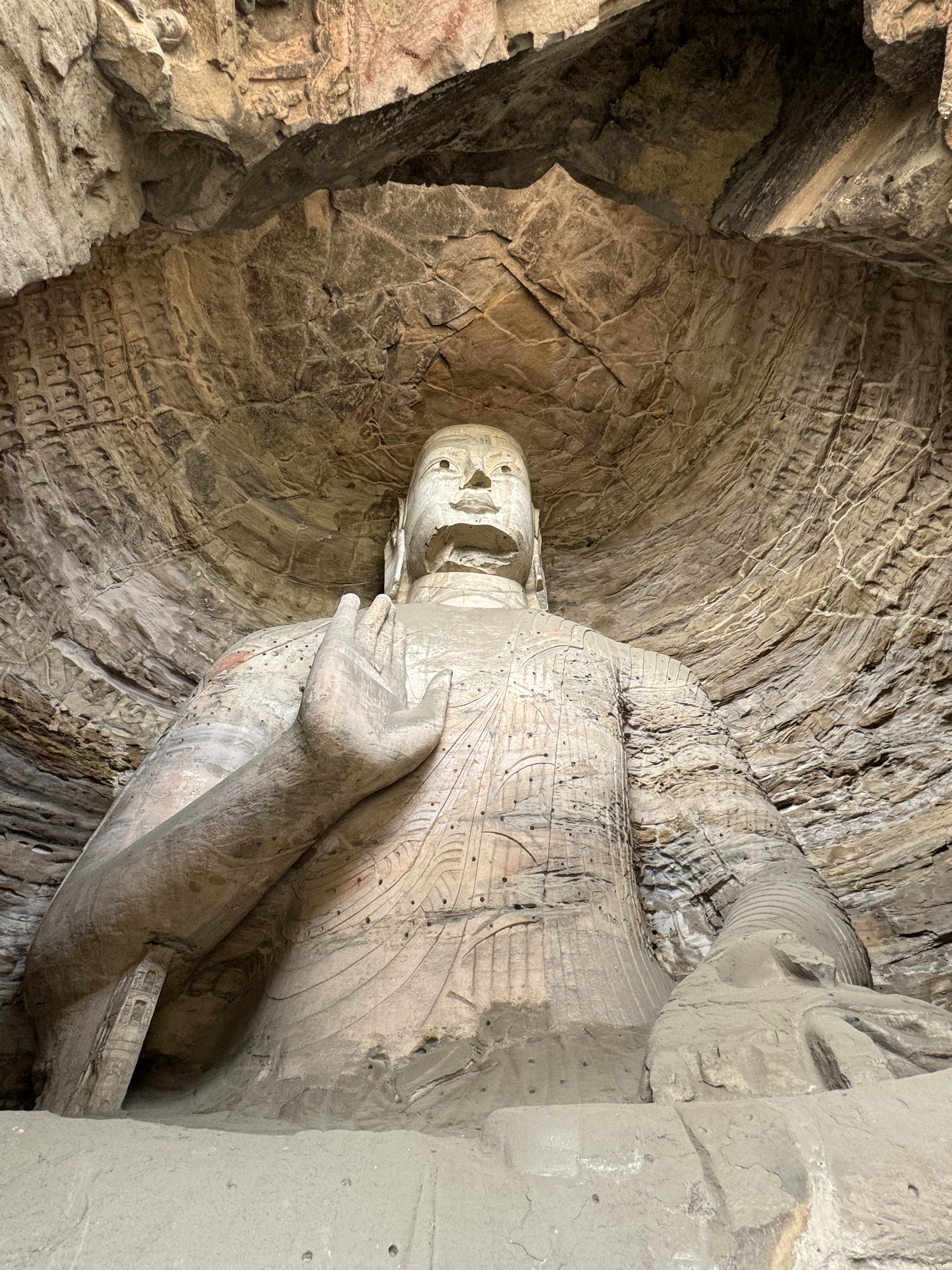
- Statue of Emperor Daowu at Yungang Grottoes

Emperor of Northern Wei
- Reign: February 20, 386 – November 6, 409
- Successor: Emperor Mingyuan
- Born: August 4, 371
- Died: November 6, 409 (aged 38)
- Burial: Jin Mausoleum of Shengle (盛樂金陵)
- Consorts: Empress Murong
- Issue: Emperor Mingyuan; Tuoba Shao; Tuoba Xi; Tuoba Yao; Tuoba Xiu; Tuoba Chuwen; Tuoba Lian; Tuoba Li; Tuoba Hun; Tuoba Cong; Princess Huayin
Names
- Initially: Tuoba Shegui (拓跋渉珪) or Tuoba Shiyigui (拓跋什翼圭), later Tuoba Gui (拓跋珪)
Era dates
- Dēng guó (登國): 386–396; Huáng shǐ (皇始): 396–398; Tiān xīng (天興): 398–404; Tiān cì (天賜): 404–409
Posthumous name
- Initially: Xuanwu (宣武, lit. "responsible and martial") later Daowu (道武, lit. "marga and martial")
Temple name
- Initially Lièzǔ (烈祖), later Tàizǔ (太祖)
- House: Tuoba
- Dynasty: Northern Wei
- Father: Tuoba Shi
- Mother: Lady He

Emperor Daowu of Northern Wei ((北)魏道武帝; 4 August 371 – 6 November 409), personal name Tuoba Gui (拓跋珪), né Tuoba Shegui (拓跋渉珪), was the founding emperor of the Northern Wei dynasty of China. He was the grandson of the last prince of Dai, Tuoba Shiyiqian. After the fall of the Dai state to the Former Qin in 376, he was presumed to be the eventual successor to the Dai throne. After the Former Qin fell into disarray in 383 following its defeat by Eastern Jin forces at the Battle of Fei River, Tuoba Gui took the opportunity to reestablish Dai in 386. He soon changed the dynasty's name to Wei and declared himself a prince. He was initially a vassal of the Later Yan, but after defeating Later Yan emperor Murong Bao in 397 and seizing most of Later Yan's territory, he claimed the imperial title in 398.

Emperor Daowu was commonly regarded as a brilliant general, but cruel and arbitrary in his rule, particularly toward the end of his reign. In 409, as he considered killing his concubine Consort Helan, his son Tuoba Shao (拓跋紹) the Prince of Qinghe, by Consort Helan, killed him, but was soon defeated by the crown prince Tuoba Si (Emperor Mingyuan) who then took the throne.

== Life before founding of Northern Wei ==
=== Birth and childhood ===
According to official accounts, Tuoba Gui was born in 371, after his father Tuoba Shi (拓跋寔), the son and heir apparent to Tuoba Shiyiqian the Prince of Dai, died earlier in the year from an injury he suffered while protecting Tuoba Shiyiqian from an assassination attempt by the general Baba Jin (拔拔斤). His mother was Tuoba Shi's wife Heiress Apparent Helan, the daughter of the powerful tribal chief and Dai vassal Helan Yegan (賀蘭野干). Tuoba Shiyiqian, while mourning his son's death, was very pleased by the grandson's birth, and he declared a general pardon in his state and named the child Tuoba Shegui. (Other than the reference to the naming at birth, however, the name "Shegui" was scantily mentioned in historical accounts of the rest of his life, and presumably was shortened to "Gui" for simplicity.)

Around New Years 377, Former Qin launched a major attack against Dai. Tuoba Shiyiqian temporarily fled his capital Yunzhong (雲中, in modern Hohhot, Inner Mongolia), but returned after Former Qin retreated. After his return, however, his nephew Tuoba Jin (拓跋斤) convinced his oldest surviving son Tuoba Shijun (拓跋寔君) that Tuoba Shiyiqian was considering naming one of the sons of his wife Princess Murong (a Former Yan princess) as heir and killing him. In response, Tuoba Shijun ambushed his father and brothers and killed them. This led to a collapse of Dai forces, and Former Qin forces occupied Yunzhong without a fight.

In the disturbance, Tuoba Gui's mother Lady Helan initially fled to her brother Helan Na (賀蘭訥), who had taken over as tribal chief after Helan Yegan's death. Later, the Former Qin emperor Fu Jiān considered taking Tuoba Gui to the Former Qin capital Chang'an, but Tuoba Shiyiqian's secretary Yan Feng (燕鳳) convinced Fu Jiān to instead allow Tuoba Gui to remain in Dai lands to be groomed as the eventual Dai prince, arguing that this would be the best way to maintain the tribes' allegiance to Former Qin. Meanwhile, Fu Jiān divided the Dai tribes into two groups, commanded by the Xiongnu chiefs Liu Kuren (劉庫仁) and Liu Weichen (劉衛辰). Tuoba Gui, along with his mother, went to live with Liu Kuren, who honored the child as a prince.

=== Adolescence ===
Little is known about Tuoba Gui's life until 385, by which time Former Qin, which had come close to uniting all of China, had fallen into great disturbance in light of rebellions throughout the empire. In 384, Liu Kuren had attempted to aid Fu Jiān's son Fu Pi, who was then under siege by Murong Chui, the founder of Later Yan, but was assassinated by Muyu Chang (慕輿常), the son of a Later Yan noble; he was succeeded by his brother Liu Toujuan (劉頭眷). In 385, however, Liu Toujuan was assassinated by Liu Kuren's son Liu Xian (劉顯), who took over as chief and viewed Tuoba Gui, now 14, as a threat. However, his subordinates Balie Liujuan (拔列六眷) and Qiumuling Chong (丘穆陵崇) found out, and at Balie's instruction Qiumuling escorted Tuoba Gui to his uncle Helan Na, who put Tuoba Gui under his protection. In 386, at the urging of previous Dai officials, Helan Na supported Tuoba Gui in reassuming the title of Prince of Dai.

=== Alternative version ===
However, an alternative version of Tuoba Gui's early life was presented in documents such as the Book of Jin and Book of Song—the official histories of the rival Jin dynasty (266–420) and Liu Song dynasty. Under this version, Tuoba Gui was not Tuoba Shiyiqian's grandson, but his son—and was born significantly earlier than the official 371 date, of Tuoba Shiyiqian's wife Princess Murong. When Former Qin attacked in 377, it was Tuoba Gui who restrained his father Tuoba Shiyiqian and surrendered. Fu Jiān, offended at this act of betrayal, exiled Tuoba Gui. When Murong Chui, his uncle, declared Later Yan in 384, Tuoba Gui joined him, and was later put in charge of his father's tribes through a military campaign waged by Later Yan. Then, later, in order to avoid having the people know Tuoba Gui's status as a traitor to his father, the official version of his personal history was manufactured.

This version is not well attested but would solve a number of apparent contradictions in early Northern Wei history. These difficulties apparent in the official version include:

- How Tuoba Gui's father, Tuoba Shi, had a nearly identical name to the perpetrator of the patricide, Tuoba Shijun. If both names were manufactured by Tuoba Gui's later apologists, then the similarity in name could be explained as lack of creativity.
- How Tuoba Han (拓跋翰), mentioned as Tuoba Shi's younger brother, was also referred to in some official sources as Tuoba Gui's younger brother; as Tuoba Yi (拓跋儀), Tuoba Han's son, played an important role early in Northern Wei history as a key diplomat and general, he would be too old to be possibly Tuoba Gui's nephew if Tuoba Gui were born in 371. Obviously, if the official history, which stated that Tuoba Yi was Tuoba Gui's cousin, were correct, then there is no problem.
- How Tuoba Gui appeared too willing to turn against his maternal uncles the Helans early in his reign. If he was actually the son of Princess Murong, then he would not be related to the Helans, and his campaigns against them seemed less problematic. (Of course, it would then render it problematic how he eventually attacked and seized most of Later Yan's history, as the Later Yan emperor Murong Bao would be his cousin.)
- How Tuoba Gui could have a younger brother—as given and undisputed in official history—Tuoba Gu (拓跋觚) -- described as also being a son of his mother Lady Helan, if he himself were born after Tuoba Shi's death. (Two alternative explanations exist, however—it could be that Tuoba Gu was actually born of a concubine of Tuoba Shi but raised by Lady Helan, or it could be that Lady Helan remarried after Tuoba Shi's death, to another member of the Tuoba clan—possibly Tuoba Yi's father Tuoba Han—and therefore her younger son Tuoba Gu would also carry the Tuoba name. The latter possibility is attested in that another semi-contradictory version of the official history stated that Tuoba Gu was Tuoba Yi's younger brother. Another possible explanation—that Tuoba Gu was a twin younger brother—appears unlikely, as the official accounts of Tuoba Gui's birth did not suggest the possibility of twin birth.)
- How Tuoba Gui's oldest son Tuoba Si, born in 392, was said to be a late-arriving son. According to the official chronology, Tuoba Gui would only be 21 at this point, and it might be difficult to comprehend his being characterized as having had a late fatherhood. On the other hand, during his lifetime, particularly among non-Han peoples, marriage and childbirth often happened during adolescence.
- How Tuoba Gui appeared to begin to show signs of mental deterioration when he was still just in his late 30s, with signs of paranoia that appeared to be more characteristic of men of much older age. The official version attribute this to poisoning from powders given him by alchemists, which is not an unreasonable explanation, however, or it also could have been that the paranoia had nothing to do with mental deterioration.

Whether Cui Hao, the prime minister of Tuoba Gui's grandson Emperor Taiwu of Northern Wei, propagated this version, and whether that contributed to Emperor Taiwu's execution of not only himself but his entire clan, is not completely clear, but appeared likely.

== As Prince of Wei ==
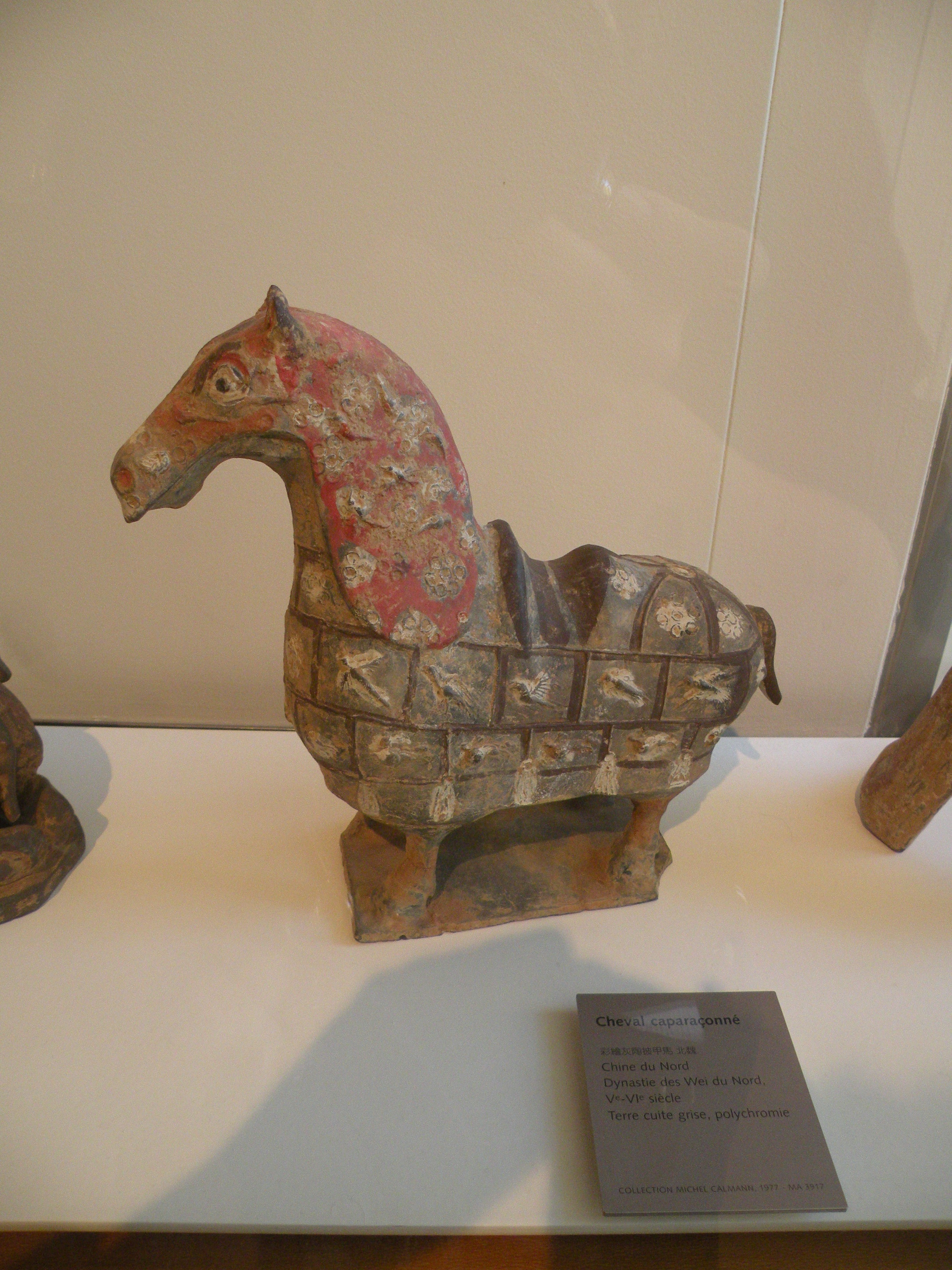
Caparisoned horse figurine, Northern Wei

=== Establishment of rule ===
For the first several years of his reign, Tuoba Gui had to endure constant gravitating of positions by tribal chiefs, and his position was not secure. As he gradually asserted his leadership, however, the tribal chiefs began to coalesce around him.

In spring 386, Tuoba Gui set his capital at Shengle (盛樂, in modern Hohhot, Inner Mongolia), and was said to encourage agriculture to try to rest his people. In summer 386, he changed his title to Prince of Wei (and thus the state became known in history as Northern Wei).

In fall 386, with support of Western Yan and Liu Xian, Tuoba Gui's youngest uncle Tuoba Kuduo (拓跋窟咄) made a claim to the throne, and there were many chiefs under Tuoba Gui who secretly conspired with Tuoba Kuduo, causing Tuoba Gui to panic to flee to his maternal uncles' Helan tribe, while seeking assistance from Later Yan. Later Yan's emperor Murong Chui sent his son Murong Lin to assist, and together they defeated Tuoba Kuduo, who fled to and was executed by Liu Weichen.

Around the new year 387, Murong Chui offered the titles of Western Chanyu and Prince of Shanggu to Tuoba Gui, but as the title of Prince of Shanggu was not as honored of one as Prince of Wei, Tuoba Gui refused them.

Despite Later Yan's assistance of him and his status as a Later Yan vassal, Tuoba Gui began to secretly consider whether he could eventually conquer Later Yan. In 388, he sent his cousin Tuoba Yi the Duke of Jiuyuan to offer tributes to Murong Chui but also to observe the Later Yan court, to consider whether he would have eventual chance of attacking it. Murong Yi concluded that Murong Chui was growing old, and that his crown prince Murong Bao was incompetent—and that there were many potential claimants who would weaken Later Yan. This encouraged Tuoba Gui greatly in his eventual planning.

In 391, Helan Na's brother Helan Rangan (賀蘭染干) plotted to kill Helan Na, and the brothers engaged in wars against each other. Tuoba Gui took this opportunity to request Later Yan to jointly attack the Helan tribe—notwithstanding Helan Na and Helan Rangan's status as his uncles. In summer 391, Murong Lin captured Helan Na and Helan Rangan, but allowed Helan Na to remain free and be in command of his tribe, while taking Helan Rangan as a prisoner. It was after this campaign that Murong Lin, seeing Tuoba Gui's abilities, suggested to Murong Chui that Tuoba Gui be detained. Murong Chui refused.

In fall 391, an incident occurred that would lead to the break of relations between Later Yan and Northern Wei. That year, Tuoba Gui sent his brother Tuoba Gu to Later Yan to offer tribute, and Murong Chui's sons detained Tuoba Gu and ordered Tuoba Gui to offer horses to trade for Tuoba Gu's freedom. Tuoba Gui refused and broke off relations with Later Yan, instead entering into an alliance with Western Yan.

Early in his reign, Tuoba Gui was considered to be a benevolent and merciful ruler who encouraged his people to take up agriculture. As an example of his leniency during this period, when his attendant Wuniuyu Huan (勿忸于桓) plotted with many of the tribes of Dai to arrest Tuoba Gui and surrender to Tuoba Kuduo, and the matter was found out, Tuoba Gui only executed the five people involved in the creation of the plot and did not put the others who joined them on trial. However, despite this leniency, Tuoba Gui did not compromise the law when handling the actions of his ministers.

=== Following hostility with Later Yan ===
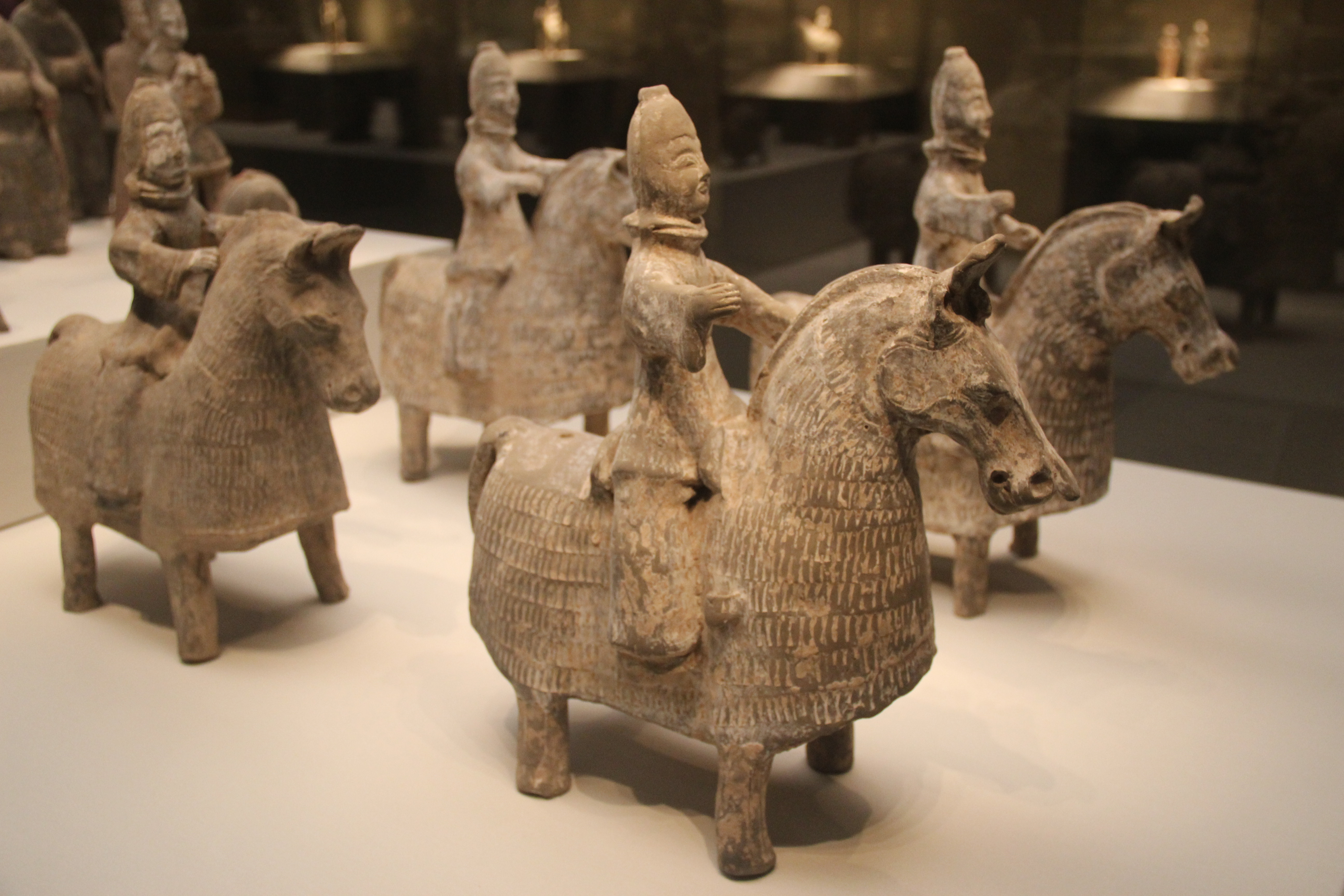
Funerary figurines of armoured cavalry from Northern Wei

In 391, Tuoba Gui attacked Rouran—which had been a Dai vassal but had never submitted to him—inflicting major damage on Rouran, but was unable to destroy it. Rouran would remain an annoyance, and often a menace, for the rest of Northern Wei's history.

In winter 391, Liu Weichen sent his son Liu Zhilidi (劉直力鞮) to attack Northern Wei, and Tuoba Gui, despite having a much smaller army than Liu Zhilidi, defeated him, and further crossed the Yellow River to attack Liu Weichen's capital Yueba (悅拔, in modern Ordos, Inner Mongolia), capturing it, forcing Liu Weichen and Liu Zhilidi to flee. The next day, Liu Weichen was killed by his subordinates, and Liu Zhilidi was captured. Tuoba Gui annexed Liu Weichen's territory and people into his own, and slaughtered Liu Weichen's clan and associates regardless of age—more than 5,000 people. Liu Wenchen's youngest son Liu Bobo, however, fled to the Xuegan (薛干) tribe, whose chief Taixifu refused to turn him over despite Northern Wei demands, and Liu Bobo would eventually marry the daughter of Later Qin's vassal Moyigan of the Poduoluo (破多羅) tribe and became dependent on him. To punish Taixifu, Tuoba Gui attacked him in 393 and slaughtered much of his tribe, although Taixifu himself fled. Despite his general leniency during this period, these massacres perhaps already displayed his cruel streak.

In 394, Western Yan's emperor Murong Yong, under heavy attack by Murong Chui, sought aid from Tuoba Gui, but Tuoba Gui, while sending an army by his cousin Tuoba Qian (拓跋虔) the Duke of Chenliu and the general Yu Yue (庾岳) to distantly try to distract Later Yan, Northern Wei forces never actually engaged Later Yan, and Murong Yong was captured and killed later that year when his capital Zhangzi (長子, in modern Changzhi, Shanxi) fell, and Western Yan was annexed into Later Yan.

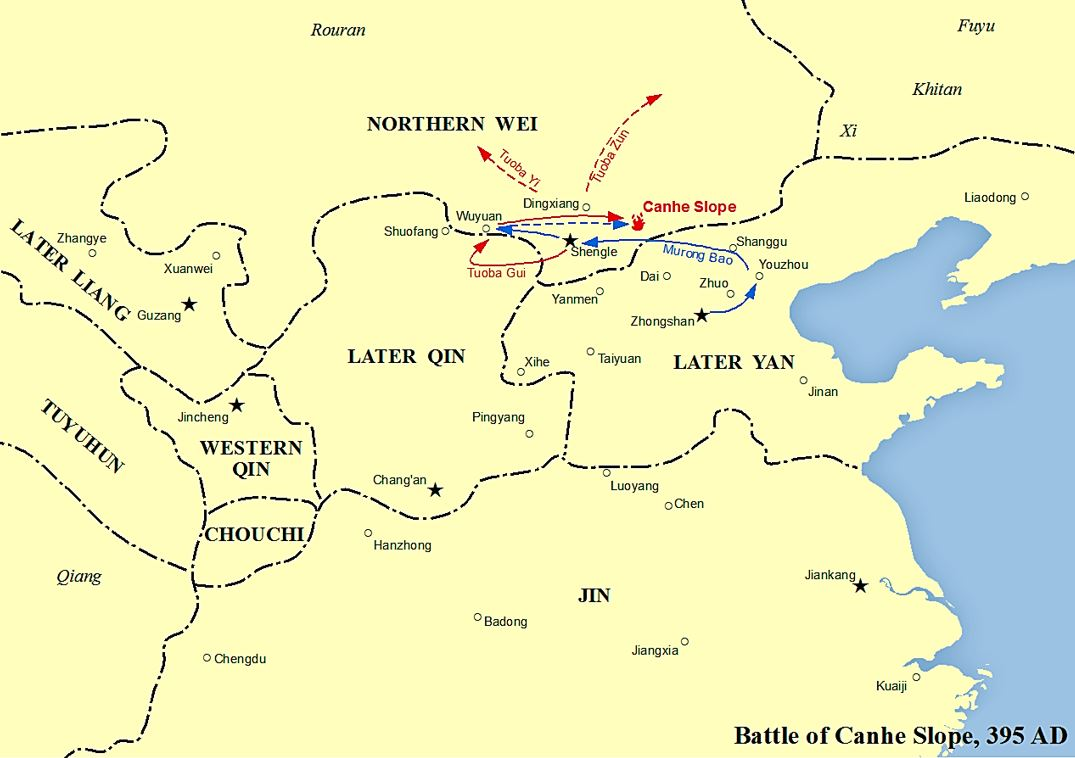
Battle of Canhe Slope in which Tuoba Gui defeated the kingdom of Later Yan

In 395, Tuoba Gui led raids against Later Yan's border regions. Later that year, Murong Chui commissioned an 80,000-men army led by Murong Bao, assisted by his brothers Murong Nong and Murong Lin, to try punish Northern Wei. Tuoba Gui, hearing about Murong Bao's army, abandoned Shengle and retreated west across the Yellow River. Murong Bao's army quickly reached the river in fall 395 and prepared to cross the river. However, by this point, Northern Wei scouts had cut off the line of communication between Murong Bao's army and the Later Yan capital Zhongshan (中山, in modern Baoding, Hebei), and Northern Wei had the captured Later Yan messengers declare that Murong Chui had already died, causing great disturbance in the Later Yan army. The Later Yan and Northern Wei forces stalemated across the Yellow River for 20 odd days, when Murong Lin's followers tried to start a coup and support Murong Lin as new leader, and while the coup failed, uncertainty fell on Later Yan forces. As winter came, Later Yan forces retreated and, not realizing that the Yellow River would freeze to allow Northern Wei forces to cross easily, Murong Bao left no rearguard as he retreated. Tuoba Gui personally gave chase, catching Later Yan forces unprepared at the Battle of Canhe Slope, killing or capturing nearly the entire Later Yan army, and only Murong Bao and a number of officers escaped. Tuoba Gui selected the talented men amongst the captives to be his own officials, wanted to release the others back to Later Yan to show his mercy. However, his relative by marriage Kepin Jian (可頻建) and the other generals were fearful of the captives and wanted to slaughter them. Tuoba Gui was afraid that slaughtering the captives would endanger his reputation in Later Yan, but he followed their suggestion and executed the remainder, though he would soon regret this.

In 396, concerned that Northern Wei would then view Murong Bao lightly, Murong Chui personally led another expedition against Northern Wei, initially successful and killing Tuoba Qian. Tuoba Gui became concerned and considered abandoning Shengle again. However, as the army reached Canhe Slope, the soldiers cried out loud for their fathers and brothers, and Murong Chui became angry and ill, forcing the Later Yan forces to retreat to Zhongshan. He soon died, and Murong Bao succeeded him as emperor.

In fall 396, Tuoba Gui led his Northern Wei troops and made a surprise attack on Bing Province (并州, modern central and northern Shanxi), defeating Murong Nong and forcing him to flee back to Zhongshan. Tuoba Gui then advanced east, ready to attack Zhongshan. Accepting Murong Lin's suggestion, Murong Bao prepared to defend Zhongshan, leaving the Northern Wei forces free to roam over his territory, believing that Northern Wei would retreat once its forces are worn out. However, this had the effect that all of the cities' garrisons in modern Hebei abandoned them, except for Zhongshan and two other important cities—Yecheng (in modern Handan, Hebei) and Xindu (信都, in modern Hengshui, Hebei). After making an initial attack against Zhongshan and failing, Tuoba Gui changed his tactic to establishing his rule over the other cities while leaving Zhongshan alone. In spring 397, Xindu fell. Meanwhile, however, Tuoba Gui had received news of a rebellion near his capital Shengle and offered peace—which Murong Bao rejected, and Murong Bao fought the Northern Wei forces at the Battle of Baisi as Tuoba Gui prepared to retreat, but instead was defeated by Tuoba Gui at great loss. At this time, concerned about a coup attempt by Murong Lin, Murong Bao abandoned Zhongshan and fled to the old Former Yan capital Longcheng (龍城, in modern Jinzhou, Hebei). However, the remaining garrison at Zhongshan supported Murong Bao's nephew Murong Xiang (慕容詳) the Duke of Kaifeng as their leader, and Tuoba Gui was unable to take Zhongshan immediately. Realizing that he had alienated the Later Yan people by having slaughtered the captives at Canhe Slope, Tuoba Gui changed his policy and tried to be gentle with the conquered Later Yan territory, and while time would be required, the territories began to abide by his rule.

Murong Xiang, meanwhile, declared himself emperor, and put Tuoba Gu to death to try to show his resolve. In the fall, however, Murong Lin made a surprise attack on him, killing him and taking over Zhongshan. Murong Lin also claimed imperial title, but was unable to stand Northern Wei military pressure, and Zhongshan fell to Tuoba Gui, who was largely gentle to Zhongshan's population despite their resistance—although he slaughtered the clans of those who advocated Tuoba Gu's death. It was around this time, however, that his army suffered a serious plague that might have killed as much as half of the army and livestock. When his generals tried to persuade him to suspend the campaign, Tuoba Gui gave a response that might be quite demonstrative of his personality:

This is the will of Heaven, and I can do nothing about it. A state can be established anywhere on earth where there are people. It only depends on how I govern it, and I am not fearful that the people would die.

Around the new year 398, with Tuoba Gui ready to attack Yecheng, Yecheng's defender Murong De abandoned it and fled south of the Yellow River, to Huatai (滑台, in modern Anyang, Henan), where he declared an independent Southern Yan state. With resistance north of the Yellow River largely gone, Tuoba Gui left Tuoba Yi and Suhe Ba (素和跋) as viceroys over the former Later Yan territory, and returned to Shengle. In order to enhance communications and control, Tuoba Gui constructed a highway between Wangdu (望都, in modern Baoding, Hebei) and Dai (代, in modern Zhangjiakou, Hebei), over the Taihang Mountains. He soon, however, recalled Tuoba Yi to be his prime minister and replaced him with his cousin Tuoba Zun (拓跋遵) the Duke of Lueyang.

In summer 398, Tuoba Gui considered restoring the old name of the state, Dai, but at the suggestion of Cui Hong, he kept the name Wei. He moved the capital from Shengle south to Pingcheng (平城, in modern Datong, Shanxi), to be in greater proximity with the conquered territories. He also issued edicts to standardize weights and measures throughout the state, and to establish standard ceremonies based on Chinese and Xianbei traditions.

Around this time, Tuoba Gui issued a series of reforms to various administrative systems. He broke up the old Xianbei tribes, forcing them to disperse and no longer allowing them to control their own armies. To replace them, he created eight artificial tribes, placed in the newly declared capital region to supervise agricultural practice in the area. When he conquered Yan, he moved a large amount of their Xianbei and Han nobility and population to the new capital to establish greater control over them, and he had them cultivate the capital region's farmland. As well, he adopted a more detailed administrative system, using elements from earlier Chinese dynasties in his system. Due to his agricultural reforms, his reign saw many abundant harvests, but the Book of Wei did not consider the harvests sufficient to sustain Tuoba Gui's frequent military campaigns and later harsh rule.

Around the new year 399, Tuoba Gui declared himself emperor. He also claimed descent from the mystical Yellow Emperor, to legitimize his reign over the Han.

During the middle period of his reign, Tuoba Gui was still considered to be a lenient emperor, despite his actions at Canhe Slope and against Liu Weichen. An example of his continued leniency would be that the generals of Murong Bao, Zhang Xiang (張驤), Li Chen (李沈) and Murong Wen (慕容文) had defected from Later Yan to Northern Wei but then back to Later Yan, yet when they were captured, Tuoba Gui pardoned them - but Zhang Xiang's son would soon after lead a rebellion against him, while Li Chen was later involved in a rebellion soon after Tuoba Gui's death. At this time, he commissioned the officials Cui Hong and Wang De (王德) to revise the simplistic Dai legal code, and in their project abolished Later Yan laws that were considered to be cruel or difficult to follow.

== Early reign as emperor ==
In 399, Emperor Daowu made a major attack on the Gaoche tribes near and in the Gobi Desert, inflicting great casualties and capturing many Gaoche tribesmen. In a display of cruelty and power, he ordered the captured Gaoche men to use their bodies as a wall on a hunt he carried out months later, to stop animals from escape. He also had the Gaoche slaves build a deer farm for him.

Later that year, he reorganized his government, expanding from 36 bureaus to 360 bureaus, and he also established a imperial university at Pingcheng and ordered that books be collected throughout the empire and be delivered to Pingcheng.

In summer 399, the Southern Yan general Li Bian (李辯) surrendered the Southern Yan capital Huatai to Northern Wei, forcing the Southern Yan emperor Murong De to instead attack Jin and take over its Qing Province (青州, modern central and eastern Shandong) as his territory.

Later in 399, because Emperor Daowu was angry that, on a letter to Jin's general Chi Hui (郗恢), the official Cui Cheng (崔逞) insufficiently deprecated the status of Emperor An of Jin (and also because he had been offended by a previous remark made by Cui in which he thought Cui compared him to an owl), he ordered Cui to commit suicide. This incident caused Emperor Daowu's reputation among the states to suffer, as for the next few years, some important Jin officials who lost out in Jin civil wars declined to flee to him for refuge because of the incident.

In 400, Emperor Daowu considered creating an empress. Of his consorts, he most favored Consort Liu, the daughter of Liu Toujuan, who bore his oldest son Tuoba Si. However, according to Tuoba tribe customs, he was required to make the potential candidates try to forge golden statues, to try to discern divine favor. Consort Liu was unable to complete her statue, while Consort Murong, the youngest daughter of Murong Bao, whom he captured when he took Zhongshan in 397, was able to complete her statue, and so Emperor Daowu created her empress.

The year 400 appears to have signaled a major turning point in Tuoba Gui's reign, as during this year, he was noted to become concerned about bad omens, and became suspicious of his subordinates, worrying they may not be loyal to him. During the year, due to the disrespect of the general Li Li (李栗), Emperor Daowu had him executed for his arrogance, which the Book of Wei considered to be a turning point in his reign, as after this he became harsher in his treatment of officials.

Another characteristic of Emperor Daowu's early to middle reign as emperor was his commissioning of construction projects, in order to expand state infrastructure and establish Pingcheng as a capital. He also had thoughts of establishing a capital at Ye in his early years as emperor, though he soon abandoned the idea. Furthermore, due to Emperor Daowu's military prowess and established governance, many surrounding tribes submitted to him during this period.

In 401–402, Emperor Daowu made an attempt to attack Later Yan, by now limited to modern Liaoning, but was unable to make gains against Later Yan's emperor Murong Sheng. In the early to mid 400s, Emperor Daowu had ambitions to conquer the south of China, and although his general Baba Fei (拔拔肥) seized much of the land of Shandong, he withdrew troops from the region when Yao Xing launched his invasion, and he never actually engaged in major wars with Eastern Jin.

Around this time, Emperor Daowu also sought marriage and peace with Later Qin. However, Later Qin's emperor Yao Xing, hearing that he already had Empress Murong, refused, and because around this time Emperor Daowu constantly attacked several Later Qin vassals, the states' relations broke down. Emperor Daowu therefore began to prepare for a confrontation with Later Qin. Later in the year, Yao Xing did make a major attack against Northern Wei. In fall 402, Yao Xing's forward commander Yao Ping (姚平) the Duke of Yiyang was surrounded by Northern Wei's Emperor Daowu at Chaibi (柴壁, in modern Linfen, Shanxi), and despite counterattacks by both Yao Ping and Yao Xing, the Northern Wei siege became increasingly tighter, and in winter 402, Yao Ping and his army were captured following a failed attempt to break out, ending Yao Xing's campaign against Northern Wei.

== Late reign ==
In the last few years of Emperor Daowu's reign, he became increasingly harsher in his treatment of his officials. For example, in 406, as he planned the expansion of Pingcheng with intent to make it into an impressive capital, he initially had his official Monalou Ti (莫那婁題), an accomplished civil engineer, plan the city's layout, but over a relatively minor issue where Monalou was not very careful, ordered Monalou to commit suicide—and then used Monalou's layout anyway. He also made increasing visits to Chaishan Palace (豺山宮, in modern Shuozhou, Shanxi), often spending months there at a stretch.

Earlier, in 403, Emperor Daowu had grown resentful of Suhe Ba due to his arrogant and extravagant behaviour. When Tuoba Gui went on a trip to Chaishan Palace, he executed Suhe Ba on the journey there. His family were afraid and attempted to flee to Later Qin, but Tuoba Gui pursued and executed them - and then, because the official Deng Yuan (鄧淵)'s cousin had a good relationship with the Suhe family and had been told of the escape plan, Emperor Daowu believed that Deng Yuan also knew of the plan and forced him to commit suicide.

In 407, Northern Wei and Later Qin entered into a peace treaty, returning previously captured generals to each other. This would have a disastrous consequence on Later Qin, however, as Liu Bobo, then a Later Qin general, became angry because his father Liu Weichen had been killed by Northern Wei, and therefore rebelled, establishing his own state Xia. However, he spent much more of his energy conducting guerilla warfare against Later Qin, gradually sapping Later Qin's strength, and did not actually conduct warfare against Northern Wei.

Also in 407, because Tuoba Zun, when he was drunk, had improper sexual relations with the Princess Taiyuan (太原公主; likely a cousin of Emperor Daowu's), he was forced to commit suicide.

In 408, in an act that appeared to be characteristic of his late-reign paranoia, when Emperor Daowu heard that Yu Yue often wore beautiful clothes, and that his bearing was graceful in the style of a ruler, Emperor Daowu became paranoid and executed Yu Yue.

By 409, Emperor Daowu, who was said to be under the effect of poisonous substances given him by alchemists, was described to be so harsh and paranoid in his personality that he constantly feared rebellion, particularly because fortunetellers had been telling him that a rebellion would happen near him. The Book of Wei describes this part of his reign as such:

Earlier, the emperor took Cold Food Powder, and after the imperial physician Yin Qiang died, the drug's effects were frequently seen in his actions. Catastrophic events were frequently seen, and the emperor was worried and restless, and might for several days not eat, or would not sleep until dawn. He accused his subordinates, his joy and anger being abnormal, said that his attendants and officials could not be trusted, and worried about heavenly divinations, or about concerns near him. He recollected the past gains and losses, all day and night speaking to himself without stopping, as if there were ghosts replying to him. When court ministers arrived before him, he would recall their past faults and would invariably execute them, and the others, perhaps because their facial expression changed, or because their breathing was not regular, or because they made mistakes in speech, the emperor would believe them to have hatred in their hearts which were becoming visible on the outside world, and he thus personally beat them, and those who died would be displayed before the Tian'an Palace. Thereupon all levels of society felt afraid in their minds, the officials were lazy and did not help to administer the country and would rob the people. Thieves would act publicly, so there were very few people mingling in alleys. When the emperor heard this, he said: "It is my relaxation of them that made it this way. Waiting to pass the calamitous era, we must cleanse and punish them in this way even more."

The entire government came under a spell of terror. The only persons immune from this treatment were said to be the minister Cui Hong and his son Cui Hao, who were said to avoid the disaster by never offending or flattering the emperor—both of which could have brought disaster.

At this time, because of omens that there would be a rebellion, Emperor Daowu executed many of his ministers to try and avert the foretold rebellion. Tuoba Yi had earlier been involved in a rebellion against Emperor Daowu, but due to his merits in creating Northern Wei, Emperor Daowu had pardoned him. Tuoba Yi was worried that Emperor Daowu would execute him for this earlier rebellion, and so he planned to flee, but he was caught and executed.

In fall 409, Emperor Daowu resolved to create Tuoba Si crown prince. Because of the Tuoba traditional custom of executing the designated heir's mother, he ordered Tuoba Si's mother Consort Liu to commit suicide. He explained his reasons to Crown Prince Si, who, however, could not stop mourning for his mother, and Emperor Daowu became very angry, and he summoned the crown prince. Crown Prince Si, in fear, fled out of Pingcheng.

At this time, however, Emperor Daowu would suffer death at another son's hand. When he was young, when he had visited Helan tribe, he saw his maternal aunt (Princess Dowager Helan's sister), who was very beautiful, and he asked to have her as a concubine. Princess Dowager Helan refused—but not under the rationale that it would be incest, but rather that the younger Lady Helan had already had a husband and was too beautiful—citing a saying that beautiful things were often poisonous. Without Princess Dowager Helan's knowledge, he assassinated the younger Lady Helan's husband and took her as a concubine. In 394, they had a son, Tuoba Shao (拓跋紹), whom he later created the Prince of Qinghe. Tuoba Shao was said to be a reckless teenager, who often visited the streets in commoner disguises, and often robbed travelers and strip them naked for fun. When Emperor Daowu heard this, he punished Tuoba Shao by hanging him upside down in a well, only pulling him out as he neared death. In fall 409, Emperor Daowu had an argument with Consort Helan, and he imprisoned her and planned to execute her, but it was dusk at the time, and he hesitated. Consort Helan secretly sent a messenger to Tuoba Shao, asking him to save her. At night, Tuoba Shao, then 15, entered the palace and killed Emperor Daowu. The next day, however, the imperial guards arrested and killed Tuoba Shao and Consort Helan, and Tuoba Si took the throne as Emperor Mingyuan. (Note: The Book of Song provided a different account of Tuoba Gui's death. In this account, Tuoba Shao was having an affair with Tuoba Gui's concubine, and because they were afraid that the matter would be found out, they plotted to kill him, but Tuoba Si, who was Tuoba Gui's second son in this account, quickly arrested and executed him. However, since such an affair was never recorded in the Book of Wei, and the Book of Song had potential motive to be biased, this account should be considered suspect.)

== Family ==
=== Consorts and issue ===
- Empress Daowu, of the Murong clan (道武皇后 慕容氏), second cousin
- Empress Xuanmu, of the Liu clan (宣穆皇后 劉氏; d. 409)
  - Princess Huayin (華陰公主), 1st daughter
    - Married Ji Ba, Prince Changle (嵇拔), and had issue (one son)
  - Tuoba Si, Emperor Mingyuan (明元皇帝 拓跋嗣; 392–423), 1st son
- Furen, of the He clan (夫人 賀氏; d. 409), aunt
  - Tuoba Shao, Prince Qinghe (清河王 拓跋紹; 394–409), 2nd son
- Furen, of the Wang clan (夫人 王氏)
  - Tuoba Xi, Prince Yangping (陽平王 拓跋熙; 399–421), 3rd son
- Furen, of the Wang clan (夫人 王氏)
  - Tuoba Yao, Prince Henan (河南王 拓跋曜; 401–422), 4th son
- Furen, of the Duan clan (夫人 段氏)
  - Tuoba Lian, Prince Guangping (廣平王 拓跋連; d. 426), 7th son
  - Tuoba Li, Prince Jingzhao (京兆王 拓跋黎; d. 428), 8th son
- Unknown
  - Tuoba Xiu, Prince Hejian (河間王 拓跋脩; d. 416), 5th son
  - Tuoba Chuwen, Prince Changle (長樂王 拓跋處文; 403–416), 6th son
  - Tuoba Hun (拓跋浑), 9th son
  - Tuoba Cong (拓跋聰), 10th son
  - Princess Huoze (濩澤公主)
    - Married Lü Dafei, Prince Zhongshan (閭大肥), a son of Yujiulü Datan, and had issue (one son)

== Explanatory notes ==
Regnal titles
Preceded by None (dynasty founded)	Prince/Emperor of Northern Wei; 386–409	Succeeded by Emperor Mingyuan of Northern Wei
Preceded by Fu Pi of Former Qin	Emperor of China (Inner Mongolia); 386–409	Succeeded by Emperor Mingyuan of Northern Wei
Preceded by Murong Bao of Later Yan	Emperor of China (Shanxi); 396–409	Succeeded by Emperor Mingyuan of Northern Wei
Preceded by Murong Bao of Later Yan	Emperor of China (Hebei); 397–409	Succeeded by Emperor Mingyuan of Northern Wei
Preceded by Murong De of Southern Yan	Emperor of China (Huatai region); 399–409	Succeeded by Emperor Mingyuan of Northern Wei
