= Princess Dowager Helan =

Chinese princess

Princess Dowager Helan (賀蘭太后, personal name unknown) (351–396), formally Empress Xianming (獻明皇后, literally "the wise and understanding empress), was, according to official history of the Xianbei-led Chinese Northern Wei dynasty, the mother of the founding emperor Emperor Daowu (Tuoba Gui). Her husband was Tuoba Gui's father Tuoba Shi (拓跋寔), the heir apparent of the Dai prince Tuoba Shiyiqian (拓跋什翼犍). (However, for reasons why this account may have its problems, see here—in particular, note below with regard to description of the parentage of Tuoba Gu (拓跋觚).)

== Dangerous times ==
Lady Helan was a daughter of the Helan tribal chief Helan Yegan (賀蘭野干), an important general under Tuoba Shiyiqian. Because of her beauty, Tuoba Shiyiqian selected her to be the wife of his son Tuoba Shi. In 371, when the general Baba Jin (拔拔斤) attempted to assassinate Tuoba Shiyiqian, Tuoba Shi took the brunt of the assault to protect his father, and he died later that year. After Tuoba Shi's death, Helan gave birth to Tuoba Gui. In 377, after Tuoba Shiyiqian was assassinated by his son Tuoba Shijun (拓跋寔君), Dai fell to Former Qin forces. Initially, she took Tuoba Gui to Helan tribe to be taken under the protection of her brother Helan Na (賀蘭訥), but later went to be under the protection of the Dugu chief Liu Kuren (劉庫仁).

Not much was known about Lady Helan or her son for a number of years. In 384, after Former Qin had begun to collapse in light of its defeat at the Battle of Fei River, Liu Kuren tried to aid the Former Qin prince Fu Pi, but was assassinated by his own general Muyu Chang (慕輿常). His son Liu Xian (劉顯) later tried to kill Tuoba Gui, but Lady Helan heard the news and allowed her son to flee. Later, both were again at Helan tribe, when similarly her brother Helan Rangan (賀蘭染干) tried to kill Tuoba Gui, but stopped after she interceded.

== Seat of power ==
After Tuoba Gui redeclared the Dai state as its prince with Helan Na's support in 386 and later changed the state's name to Wei, Lady Helan was honored as princess dowager. In 391, when Tuoba Gui sent his younger brother and her son Tuoba Gu as a messenger to Later Yan to pay tribute, Tuoba Gu was detained by Later Yan, and it was said that she grew ill from her worries for him. She died in 396. (The problem with this account is that if Tuoba Shi had died before Tuoba Gui's death, than she could not have had an even younger son by him—but of course, she might have married another member of the Tuoba clan, perhaps Tuoba Shi's younger brother Tuoba Han (拓跋翰), for Tuoba Gu was also referred to as the younger brother of Tuoba Han's son Tuoba Yi (拓跋儀).) After Tuoba Gui declared himself emperor around the new year 399, he posthumously honored Tuoba Shi as an emperor and her as an empress.
