= Leontopolis (disambiguation) =

Leontopolis may refer to:

- Leontopolis, also known as Tell el-Muqdam, capital of the 11th nome of Lower Egypt
- Leontopolis (Heliopolis), also known as Tell el-Yahudiya, a city of the 13th nome of Lower Egypt

Leontopolis may also refer to:

- Bizana, Turkey, in eastern Anatolia
- Isaura Nova, in Isauria, Turkey
- Nicephorium, in Syria
- Zaliches, near Sinop
