= Arcadia (daughter of Arcadius) =

Daughter of Emperor Arcadius, 400–444

Arcadia (Greek: Άρκαδία; 3 April 400 – 444) was the third daughter of the Roman emperor Arcadius (r. 383–408) and Aelia Eudoxia and a member of the Theodosian dynasty.

== Life ==
Arcadias paternal grand-parents were Theodosius I and Aelia Flaccilla, while Arcadia's maternal grandfather was the general Flavius Bauto who had been a powerful figure in the court of emperor Valentinian II.

Arcadia, as daughter of the emperor held the title of nobilissima [English: most noble]

Arcadia's older sister, Flaccilla, was born in 397 but probably died young. Her younger sibling was the male heir and future emperor Theodosius II (r. 402–450).

Her mother died in 404, after a seventh and last pregnancy ended in either a miscarriage or, according to pseudo-Martyrius, a second stillbirth. Eudoxia suffered a hemmoraghe and died of an infection shortly thereafter.

On 1 May 408, Arcadias father Arcadius died. The siblings were now orphaned and essentially left without close relatives since the only ones remaining of the family were their uncle Honorius and aunt Galla Placidia. The children were then placed under the care of the eunuch and imperial palace chamberlain Antiochus., while the ruling of the empire was given over to Anthemius, the praefectus urbi of Constantinopel.

Though not much is known about her early life and education, some things can be surmised from knowledge of the Byzantine view on education for girls, imperial customs and of the inclinations of her parents.

The general view of women's education in the Byzantine empire was that it was sufficient for a girl to learn domestic duties and to study the lives of the Christian saints and memorize psalms, and to learn to read as to take part of the holy scriptures.

As an imperial daughter of the pious Theodosian dynasty, Arcadia would have been instructed in religion, but as a member of the ruling dynasty her education would need to be more rigorous than the average Byzantine noble girl. Therefore she would have been given a classical education, and have been taught to read and write in Latin and Greek

Though her schooling was most likely not as extensive as that of her younger brother Theodosius education as the heir to the Byzantine emperor.

Anastasius, a friend of the Greek bishop Synesius of Cyrene, was appointed the tutor of the imperial children in around 405-407.

Following the example of her older sister Aelia Pulcheria Arcadia and their younger sister Marina, took a vow of virginity in 414 in front of the altar in the Great Church of Constantinople, but unlike Pulcheria, Arcadia never married, devoting herself to religion.

Rituals within the imperial palace included chanting and reciting passages of sacred scripture and fasting twice per week. The sisters relinquished luxurious jewelry and apparel, which most women of the imperial court wore. The environment at court in the words of Socrates became no "different than a monastery".

Arcadia and her sisters were also involved in charity, which involved caring for the poor and sick and giving shelter to the homeless.

Atticus dedicated a now lost treatise titled "On faith and virginity" to the three sisters. While Cyril of Alexandria penned a treatise named "Adress to the most Pious Princesses"[Latin: Oratio ad Dominas]

The sisters also met with Hypatius of Bithynia

Longing to see the famous Hypatius, the three princesses, sisters of the emperor, came to the palace near the Apostles Church.From there they sent word to him; come so that we can see you, if you do not we will come to you for your blessing.Feeling himself compelled because they loved Christ, Hypatius went to them. He heartened them with exhortation, uttered a prayer, blessed them and took his leave.

— Callinicus, Life of Hypatios

It is likely that there also was a political motivation behind this decision, with the sisters acting as representatives and showcasing the piety of the emperor and ruling family.

Furthermore any potential husbands of the sisters could have gained influence over their young brother, or even posed a threat to him. Abstaining from marriage and forbidding men to come near the sisters also meant they would not give birth to any children who could potentially become rival heirs.

The sisters would attend council meetings though to what extent Arcadia actual politicial influence extended is unclear, but as a sister to emperor she was seen as an direct link to the emperor and a important person. Arcadua received letters and visits from Byzantine supplicants from within and outside the empire who hoped she would advance their cause with the emperor and his regent Pulcheria.

Arcadia seems to have followed her sister Pulcherias politics and policies and not pursued any political agenda that differed from her older sisters.

Though coins were struck with Pulcherias likeness, none seems to have been struck with Arcadias, nor with Marinas likeness. As Byzantine coinage not only functioned as currency but as powerful propaganda tools, the absence of such depictions of the sisters could indicate an active attempt to curtail any attempt of increased politicial significance on behalf of Arcadia and Marina or a perhaps a concentrated effort to focus power solely on Theodosius II and Pulcheria.

Its also is known that all three sisters were involved in heated debate with Nestorius, the arch-bishop of Constantinople regarding the complex theological and doctrinal matter of Mary as the mother of Jesus. Nestorius stance on the usage of Theotokos ("God-Bearer"), used for Mary, mother of Jesus, in order that Christ's human and divine natures not be confused, as he believed Christ was born according to his humanity and not his divinity, which Arcadia and her sisters found heretical and demeaned the status of women.

Nestorius was subsequently removed from his position and exiled.

After her brothers marriage to Aelia Eudoxia in 421, Arcadia moved out the palace to live at the coast in Hebdomon palace with Pulcheria, Marina and a circle of ascetic women.

Though removed from the Byzantine imperial palace and its court, the palace where the sisters lived was in close vicinity to the Magnaura hall where the Byzantine senate convened and where several emperors had been crowned (including their father Arcadius) and where traditionally the emperor would greet foreign ambassadors. The building therefore held great political and symbolic value which would have been beneficial for the sisters to keep close to the power.

Around 422/423, the empress Galla Placidia, their aunt arrived in Constantinople having to flee from Arcadias uncle (and Galla Placidias brother) Honorius. Though Galla Placidia was highly religious herself she seems to have joined in her nieces religious fervor in an effort gain Pulcherias trust and solicit Pulcheria to convince Theodosius II to intervene in the matter of their cousin Valentinian III to succeed to the throne of the Western Roman Empire.

== Death ==
Arcadia died in 444.

=== Constructions ===
In Constantinople, she ordered the construction, near the Gate of Saturninus, of a monastery dedicated to Saint Andrew. The building, named also Rodophylion (Ancient Greek: Ροδοφύλιον) lay about 600 m. west of the gate. Heavily transformed, the church of the monastery is now the Koca Mustafa Pasha Mosque of Istanbul. Arcadia had two mansions, and possibly built a bath in Constantinople.

== In culture ==
Arcadia appears as a supporting character in the tragic play "The emperor of the east" (1632) by Philip Massinger.

Religious art featuring Pulcheria as a saint sometimes depicts her accompanied by her three sisters. Notable examples include a mural by José Joaquín Magón, "St. Pulcherias victory over heresy" by Courtois Guillaume and an engraving by Hieronymus Wierix.

== Sources ==
- «Arcadia 1», PLRE I, p. 129.
- Janin, Raymond (1953). La Géographie Ecclésiastique de l'Empire Byzantin. 1. Part: Le Siège de Constantinople et le Patriarcat Oecuménique. 3rd Vol. : Les Églises et les Monastères (in French). Paris: Institut Français d'Etudes Byzantines.
- Müller-Wiener, Wolfgang (1977). Bildlexikon Zur Topographie Istanbuls: Byzantion, Konstantinupolis, Istanbul Bis Zum Beginn D. 17 Jh (in German). Tübingen: Wasmuth. ISBN 978-3-8030-1022-3.
