= Tutela de Vieux-la-Romaine =

Fragmentary Gallo-Roman statue discovered in 1988

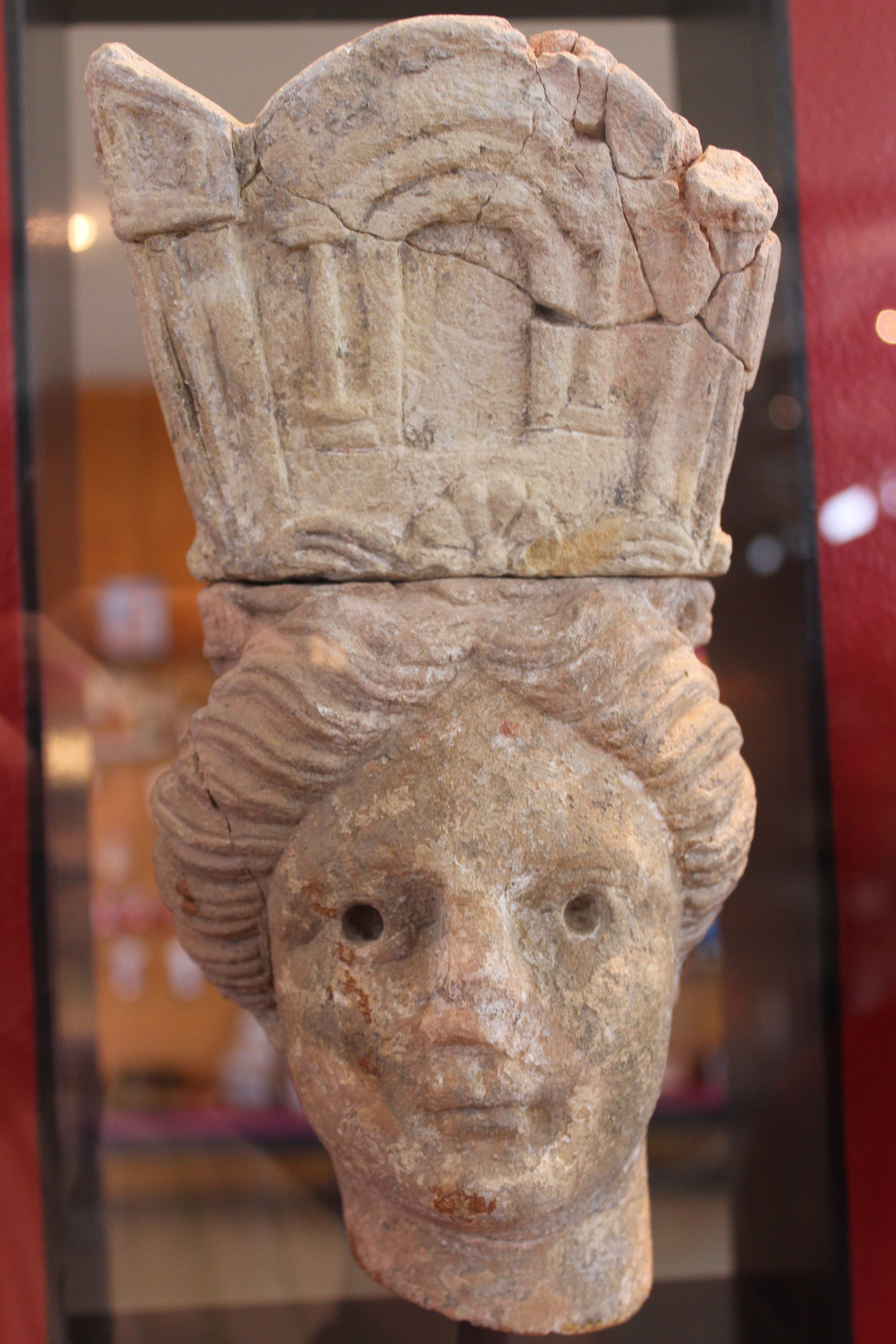
Detail of the tutela of Vieux-la-Romaine discovered during the archaeological excavations of the house with the large peristyle (Calvados, Normandy, France).

The Tutela de Vieux-la-Romaine is a fragmentary Gallo-Roman statue discovered in 1988 during excavations at the Maison au grand péristyle in the commune of Vieux-la-Romaine. This aristocratic urban dwelling was almost entirely excavated and yielded significant archaeological material, now preserved in the Musée archéologique de Vieux-la-Romaine. This museum was explicitly established in 2002 to house the Tutela de Vieux-la-Romaine and other artifacts from the site.

The town was first identified in the late 17th century, and excavations at the Vieux site continued until the end of the 19th century. They resumed in the 20th century, spurred by the Société des Antiquaires de Normandie. Unfortunately, many of the findings from the early excavations have been lost. Excavations in the 20th century were initially limited to the area where the Tutela was discovered.

The Tutela, a find in present-day Normandy, is one of the few Roman statues discovered in the region. Despite the existing gaps, it can be restored by comparison with other works. According to its inventor, Pascal Vipard, it has 'artistic and religious interest [that] goes beyond the limits of simple local history.' This piece of history allows us to reconstruct the environment of a wealthy aristocratic family who likely exercised political responsibilities in this Roman city, underscoring its historical and cultural significance.

== History ==
=== Ancient history ===
Simplified map of Aregenua.

The figurine was unearthed at the archaeological site of Vieux-la-Romaine, 10 km southwest of Caen, in a 1st-century structure destroyed by fire in the 3rd century. This structure is known as "le bas de Vieux."

The history of Vieux, the capital of the Viducasses, is a testament to the ebb and flow of history. The city, established in the 1st century, thrived until the 2nd century. However, a decline in prosperity marked the end of this century, leading to significant changes. The town became part of Augustodurum, now Bayeux, and eventually reverted to the status of a village. However, perhaps the most profound change was the rise of Christianity, which became the dominant religion from the 5th century onwards.

The archaeological layer in which the remains were discovered corresponds to the fire that ravaged the house at the end of the 3rd century. The statue was damaged when the roof frame and walls collapsed. The room is crossed by a street laid out during the late antiquity period.

=== Rediscovery ===
==== Rediscovery of Vieux-la-Romaine ====
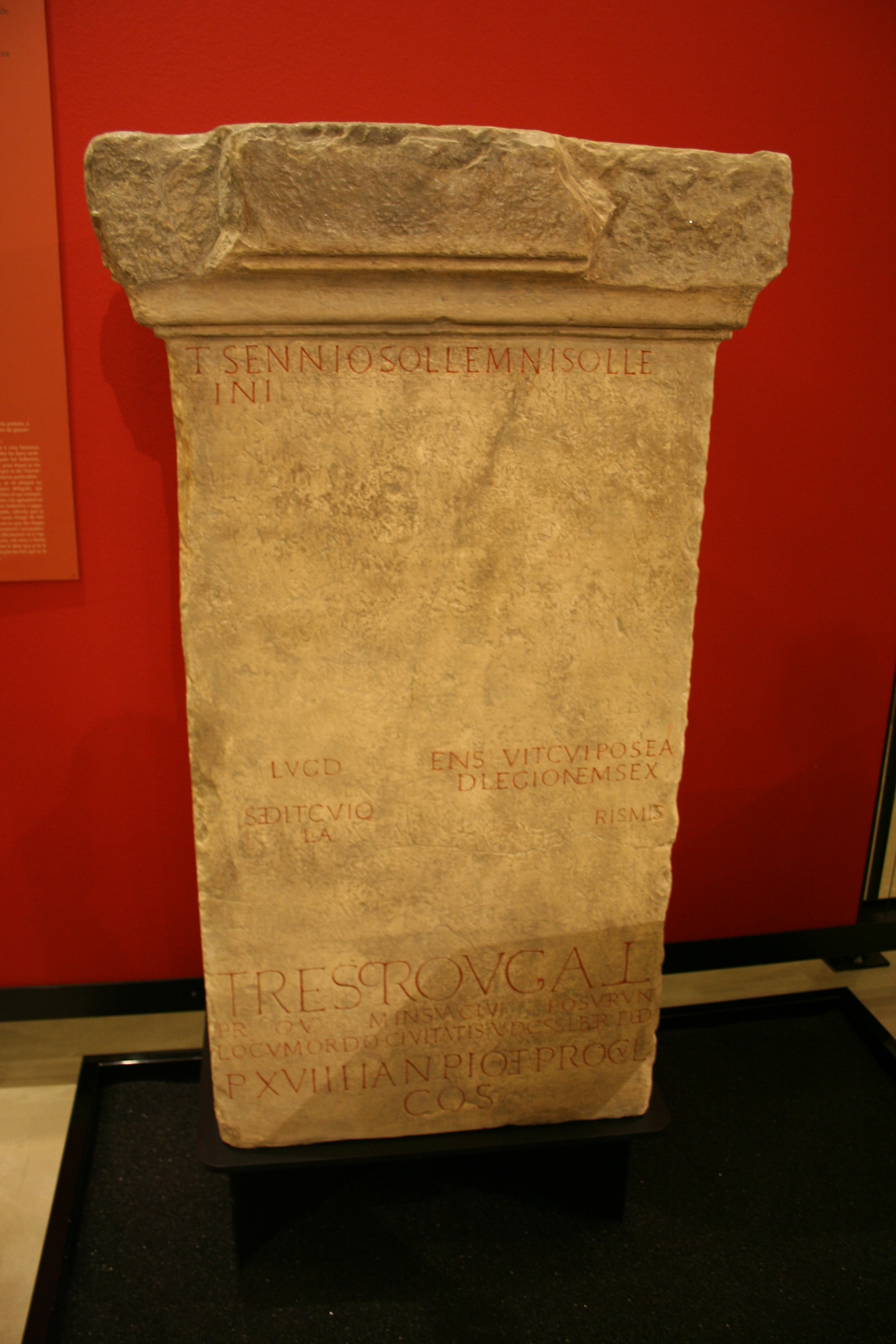
Copy of the Thorigny marble at the Musée archéologique de Vieux-la-Romaine.

In 1580, the Thorigny marble, a significant Roman inscription, was unearthed and transported to Château Matignon in Torigni-sur-Vire, where it is currently on display. The site's identification dates back to the late 17th century, which adds an intriguing dimension to this historical discovery.

Excavations at Vieux commenced at the beginning of the 18th century but were conducted with sufficient rigor and resources in the 1970s. As a result, the available knowledge still needs to be completed.

Excavations in the "Bas de Vieux" sector resumed in 1988, marking the first large-scale excavation at Vieux since 1864. This initiative led to the discovery of a rich dwelling and a considerable mass of material and data. This discovery prompted the establishment of the Musée Archéologique de Vieux-la-Romaine. The excavation of the house with the great peristyle spanned four campaigns. A site museum was established to display the discoveries made. In the 1990s, another less opulent house, the U-shaped courtyard house, was excavated and showcased. In the 2000s, the forum was also subject to excavation.

Despite extensive research, a full understanding of the Roman city remains incomplete in the 21st century. Scholars continue to reconstruct its organization, making it an active area of ongoing study.

==== Discovery of the statue in the house with the large peristyle ====
The blueprint shows the house at its monumental peak. The statue was in the northwestern ceremonial room. It is colored pink on the blueprint.

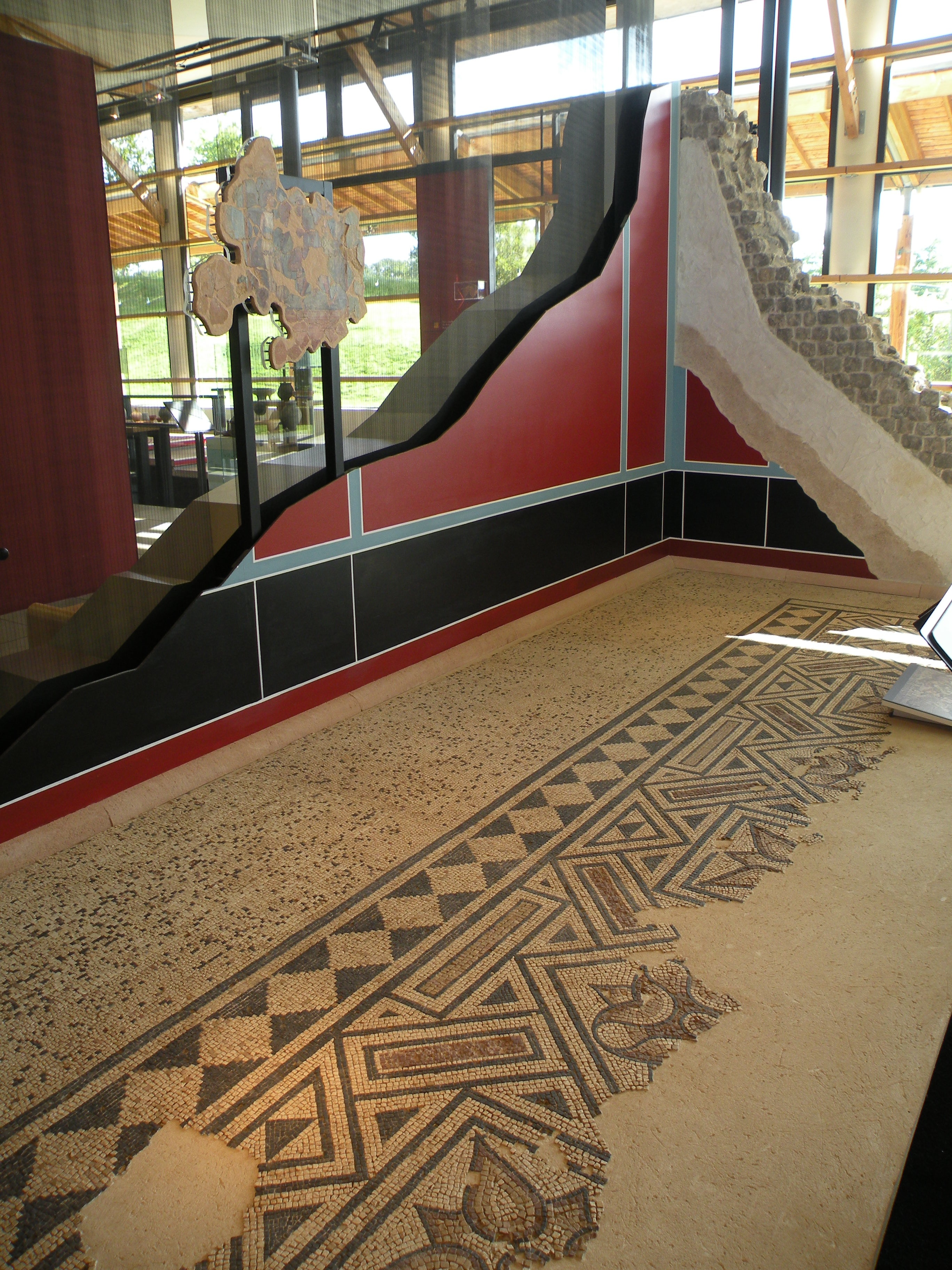
Fragmentary mosaic found in the same living room as the tutela.

The "Maison au grand péristyle" is the most luxurious building excavated on the Vieux archaeological site. The building has a long history, during which two dwellings were combined to form the "Maison au petit péristyle" and then underwent a new development, during which it was called the "Maison au grand péristyle." It reached its apogee in the late 1st and early 2nd centuries, covering an area of approximately 1,420 m^{2}.

The figurine was discovered in August 1988 in the northwestern corner of a room measuring 8 m by 6.5 m. This room was identified as a ceremonial hall on the first floor of the western wing of the house with a small peristyle, which opened onto the interior garden. Unfortunately, the building's roof structure and cob walls were destroyed in the fire, and the statue was knocked over.

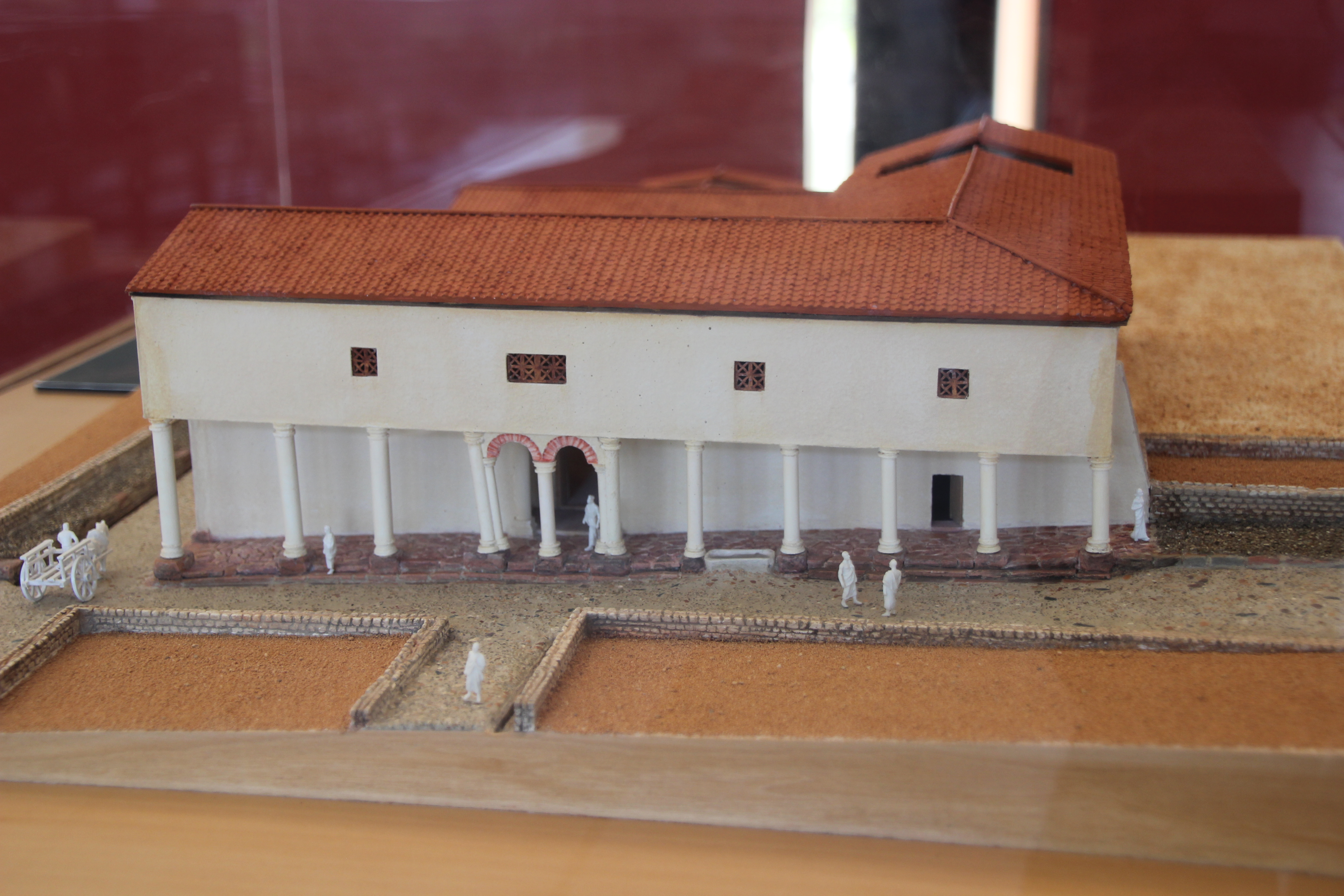
The model of the arcade and front gallery is seen from the north.

A fire related to artisanal activities damaged the building and was subsequently crossed by the Cardo Q road, constructed around 330–340. The materials were widely salvaged, and a homogeneous demolition layer is present—this destruction phase dates from the end of the 4th to the beginning of the 5th century. However, an axe found during excavations dates from 475 to 550.

The work was published as early as 1990 in an article written at the end of the same year as the discovery. Further excavations yielded additional fragments and provided further insight into the context. The item was exhibited at the Musée de Normandie during the second half of 1990.

== Description ==
=== General description ===
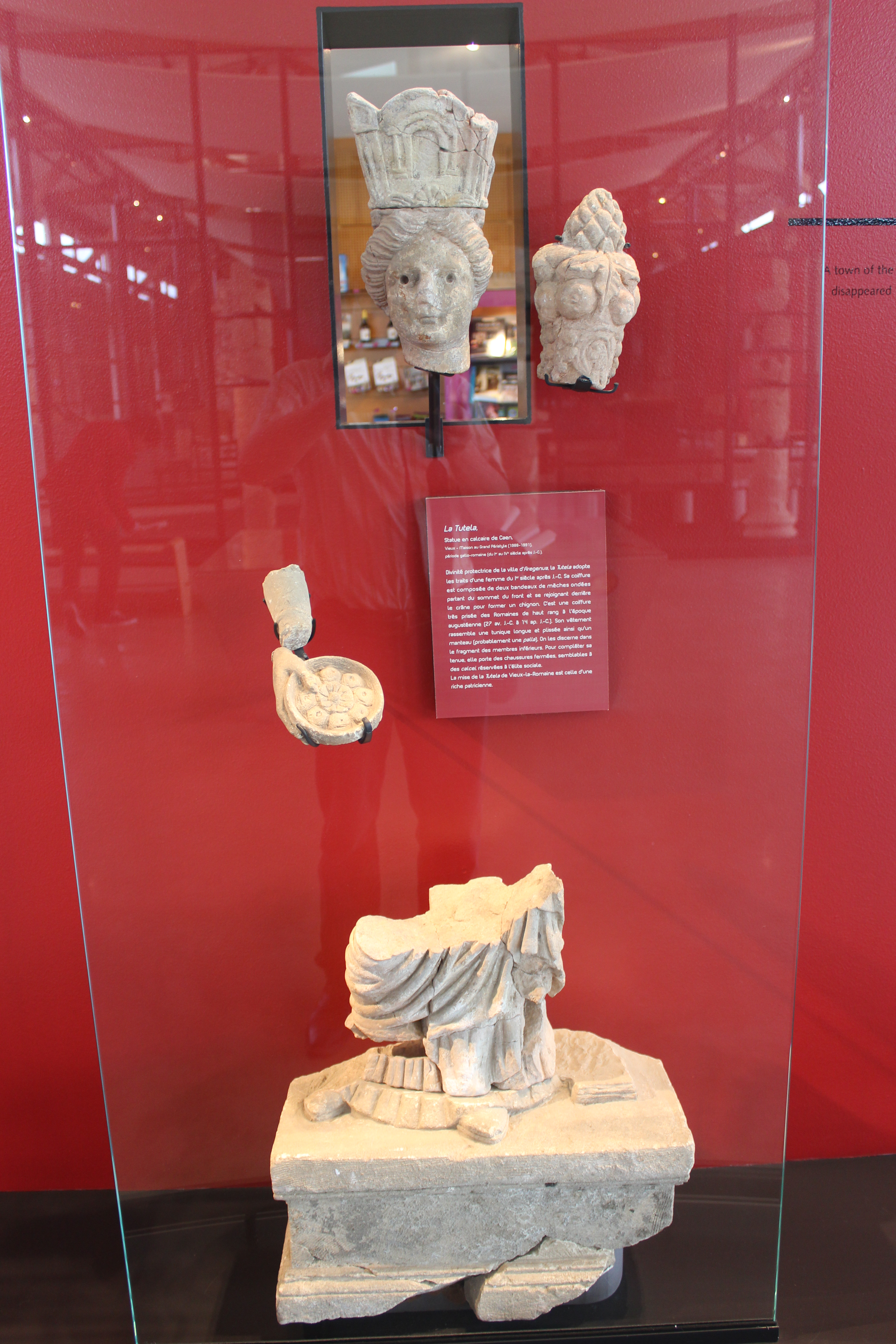
General view of the statue with the recovered fragments.

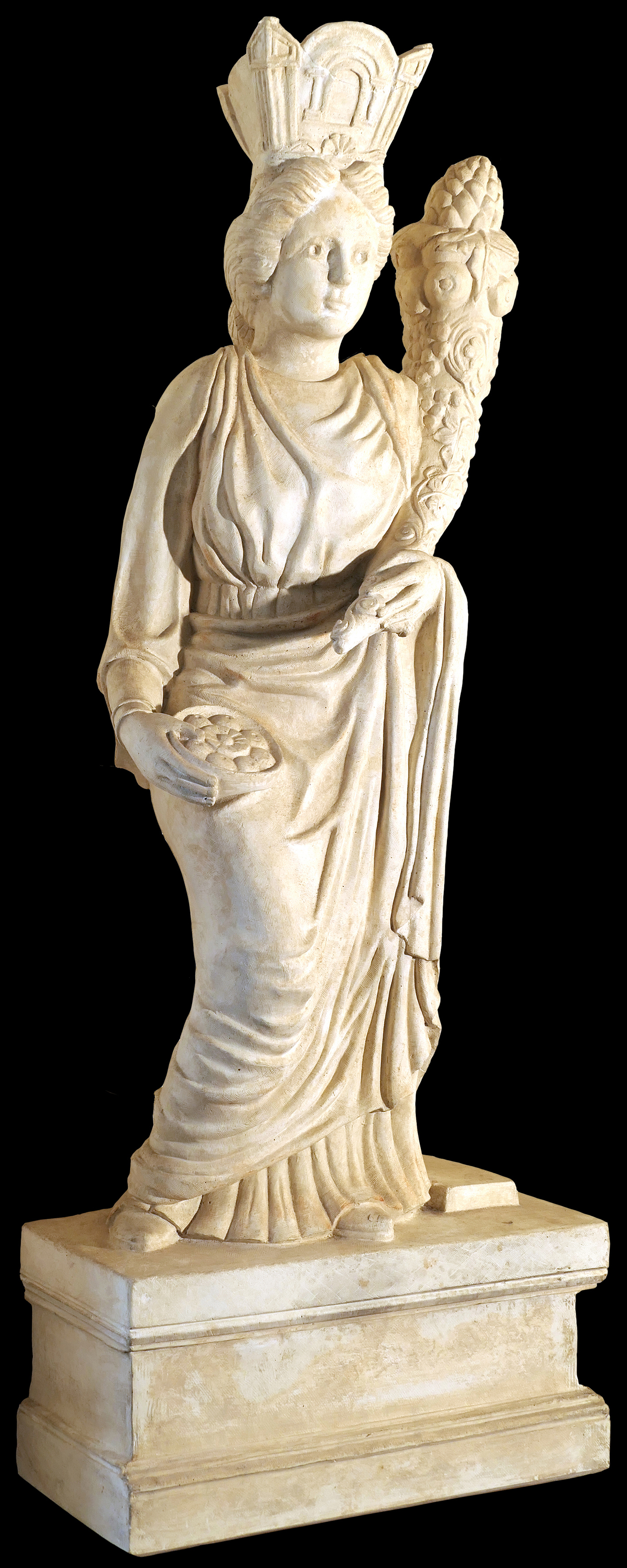
Suggested reconstruction based on preserved elements.

The statue, crafted from local limestone and Caen stone, has an initial height of 1 m to 1.10 m. It portrays a young woman, and more than half of the work is missing. Nevertheless, the potential for reconstruction, based on known equivalent statues, highlights its historical significance and the esteem in which it is held.

The female figure, clothed in a tunic and cloak, grasps a cornucopia in her left hand and a coat hook in her right. The statue is adorned with a crown featuring turrets and represents a triumphal arch or city gate on the front. The bent right leg conveys a sense of movement in the piece. The statue is affixed to a base, which still retains a mortise. The piece was attached using a mortise and tenon joint. The fire has left deep marks on the work, which now has a slightly stiff appearance.

Upon rediscovery, the statue exhibited evidence of polychromy, including on the face. All the sculpted elements found in the house were painted, so it must have had a very colorful appearance.

=== Description of details ===
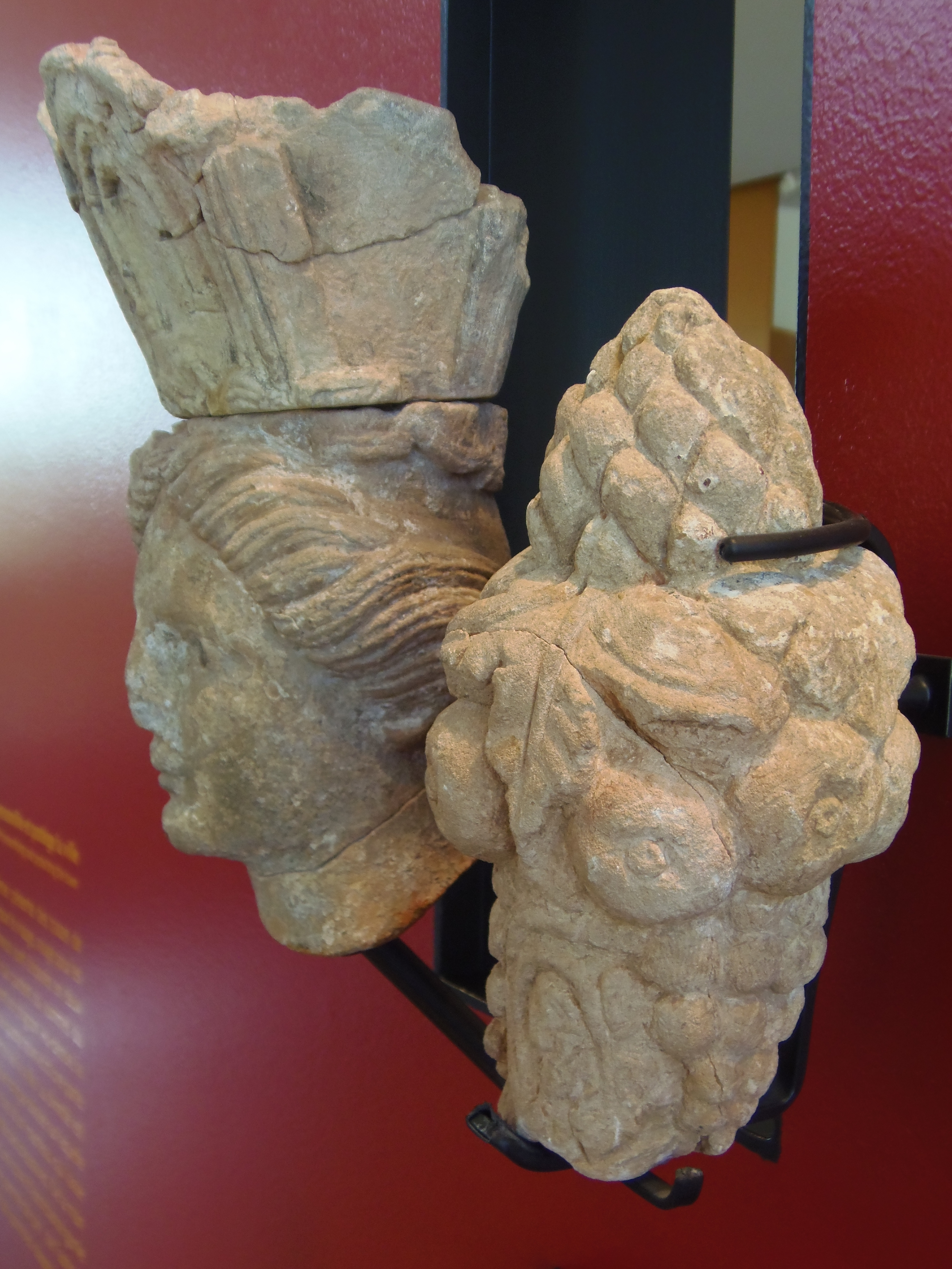
View of the statue's head and cornucopia.

The excavations yielded six components: the head, the left hand, the base, an unidentified fragment, a crown with towers, and a fragmentary cornucopia. The arms, body, and base were not found at the initial publication. Therefore, it is assumed that the items in question were either recovered or unavailable when the cardo pierced the house. During the 1989 and 1990 excavations, the statue and base fragments were discovered.

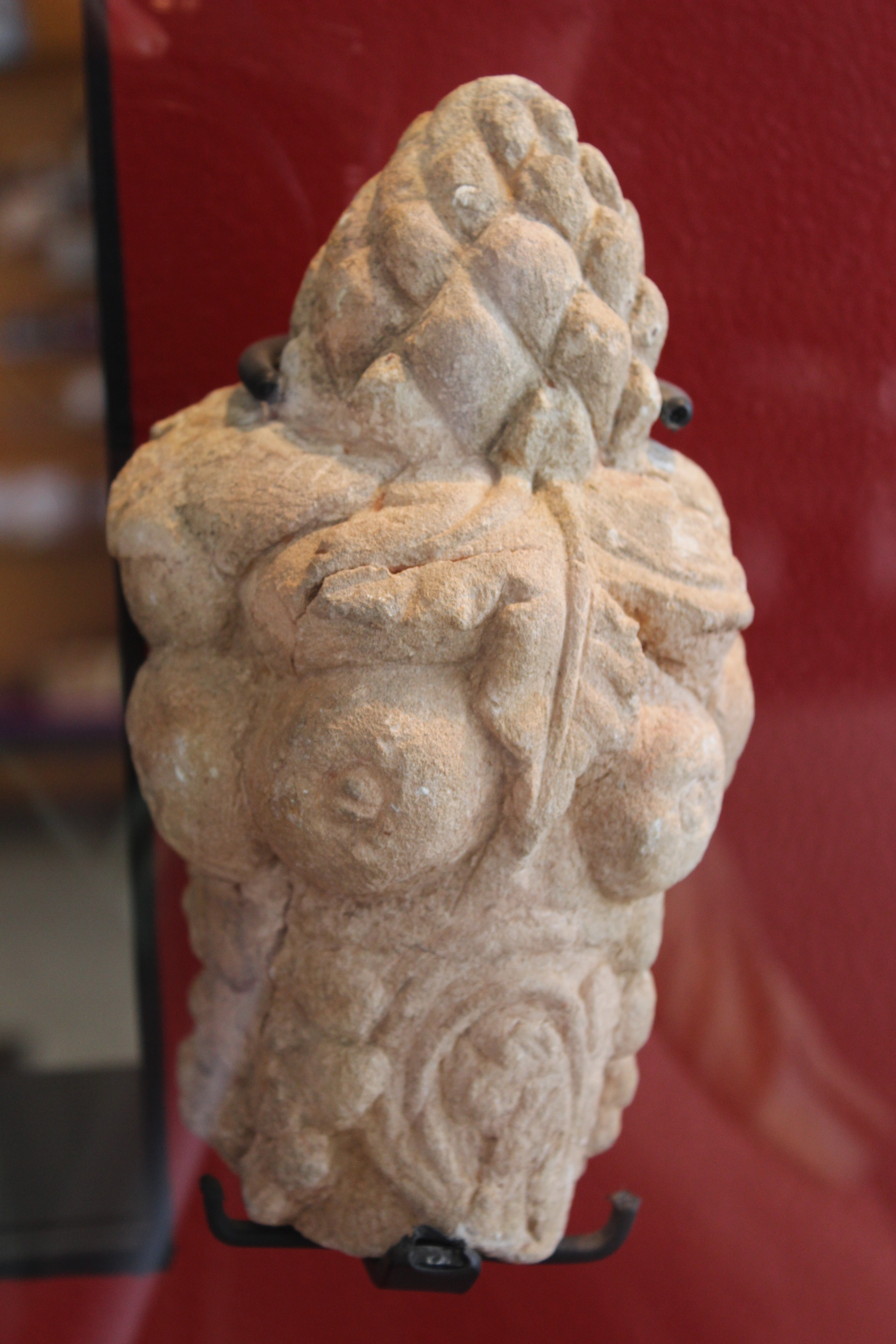
View of the cornucopia.

The head, measuring 17 cm in height, was discovered without its eyes, which were likely made of glass paste. The young woman's hair, styled in two buns at the ends, is a hallmark of the Antonine fashion, particularly associated with Faustina the Younger, Bruttia Crispina, or Lucilla, wife of Lucius Verus. The divinity of Vieux is more closely aligned with the portrayal of Faustina II, executed around 160–170, adding a significant historical context to our findings.

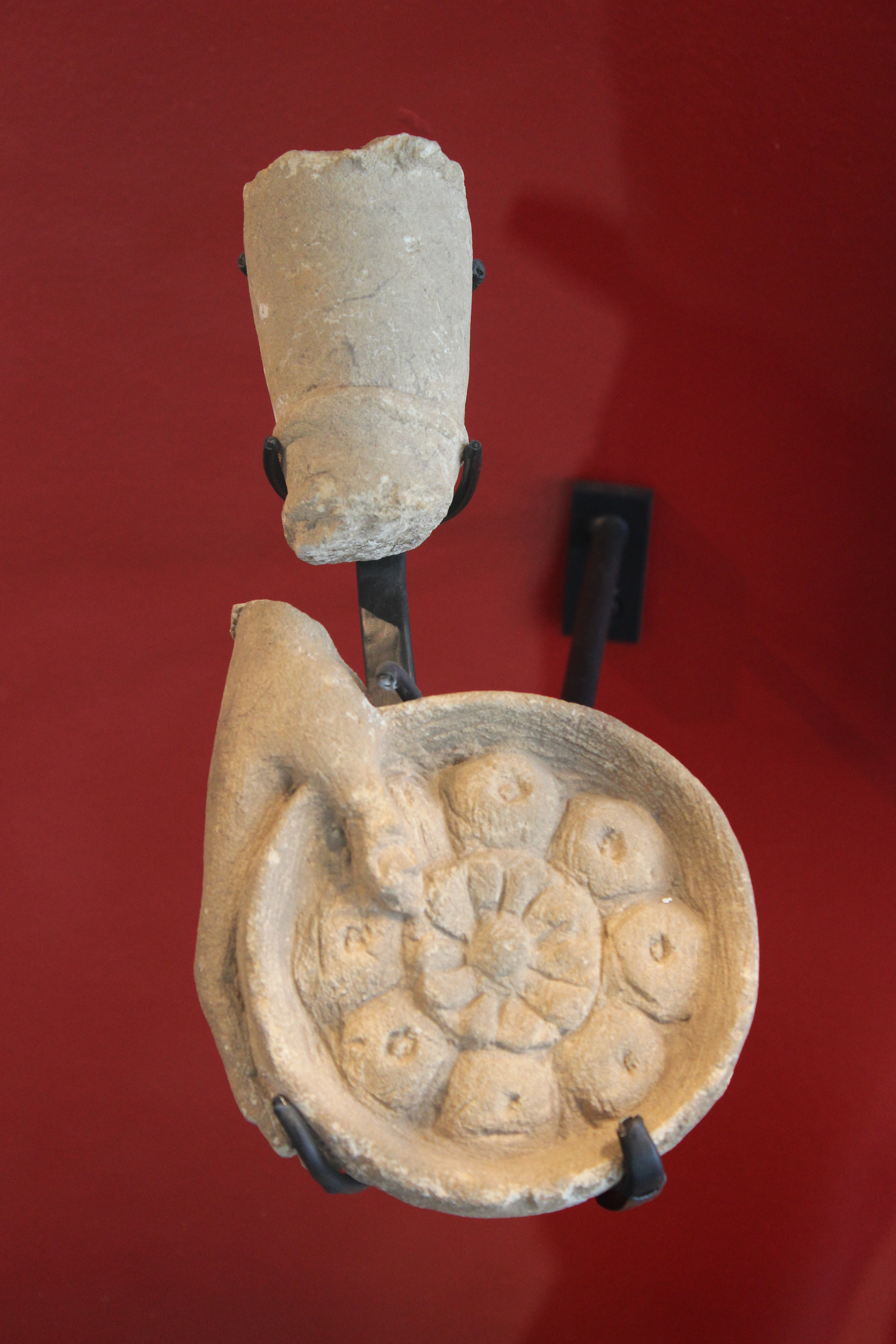
The statue's hand holding the peg.

The tower on the young woman's head, which stands at 11 cm in height, is not integrated with her overall structure. It was affixed with an adhesive substance, presumably glue or mortar. The front motifs of the tower are continuous with the head, whereas this continuity is not present on the back of the statue. This discrepancy may be attributed to either a lack of precision in the original execution or the result of a subsequent restoration. A half-flower is present on the front. Additionally, the front of the tower features an arch, two columns, and a door. The representation is similar to that of a triumphal arch or city gate. The presence of towers indicates the existence of a city gate. The tower's rear and lateral aspects have sustained damage due to the fire that devastated the building.

The left hand, measuring 14 centimeters in length, features a prominent ring on the little finger and is seen holding a cornucopia. The fingers are notably slender.

Only the cornucopia's upper part, measuring 20 cm in height, remains. The piece features grape cluster motifs, a vine leaf, apples, fig leaves, and a pine cone at the top. The non-visible elements are not given the same level of attention as the visible ones. The cornucopia has a pear-shaped profile. It is possible that a pillar supported the piece.

Due to the breakage of the little finger, the right hand is holding a peg with eight apples arranged around a flower. It is presumed that the peg was placed on the statue's garment. Two bracelets were observed on the young woman's wrist. The hand and forearm measure 18 centimeters. The fragments were unearthed between 15 and 20 meters from the statue's original location. They were likely deposited at this site during the High Middle Ages.

The garment base, a 24-cm long tunic, is worn by a young woman draped in a mantle with an eleven-piece base. An intriguing element, possibly related to the garment's drapery, remains unidentified. The young woman is depicted wearing a stola and a palla, which adds further intrigue to this unique discovery.

In 1990, a portion of the pedestal was unearthed. The exhibit also displays a section of shoes of the calcei type. The base measures 45 cm by 27.5 cm and is 22.5 cm tall.

== Interpretation ==
=== Artist and quality ===
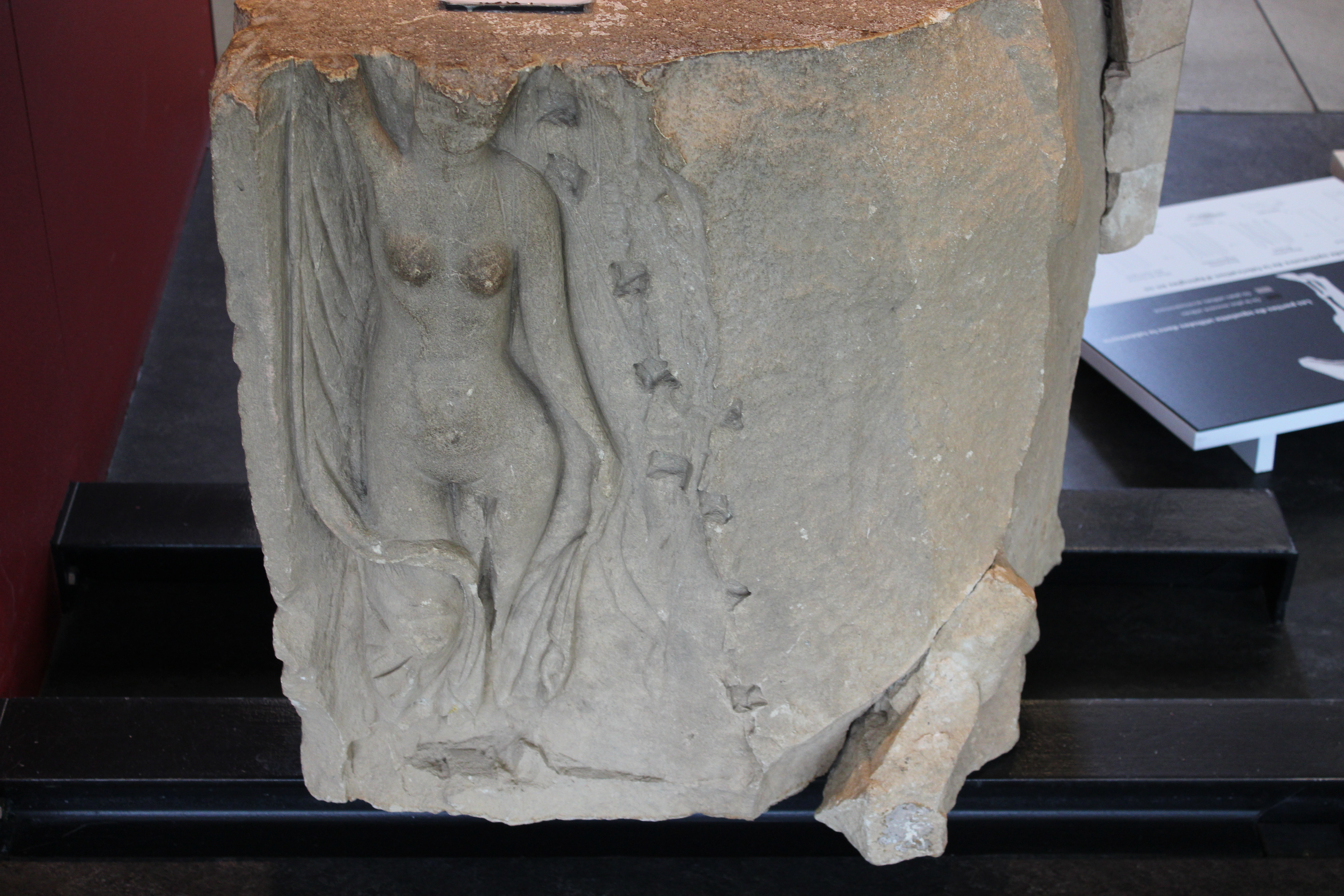
The east face of the southeast pillar of the house with the large peristyle is a Venus anadyomene relief in the Musée de Vieux, possibly by the same artist as the Tutela.

The author's identity is uncertain, and whether he was a resident or came from outside Viducasses is unclear.

It is possible that the same artists who created the entrance pillars to the residence also sculpted this work. The pedestal, however, is of "rather clumsy execution." The statue was installed in the building when the house underwent an expansion in the late 1700s, and it was placed on a mosaic dating from the latter half of the 1st century or the early 3rd century.

It is uncommon for statues to be unearthed in Vieux. Three fragments were excavated in the late 17th and early 18th centuries but have since been misplaced. The discovery of these artifacts in a specific archaeological context contributes to our overall understanding of the town.

=== Unclear symbolism ===
The statue's identification has been questioned, and the individual responsible for its creation has proposed several hypotheses.

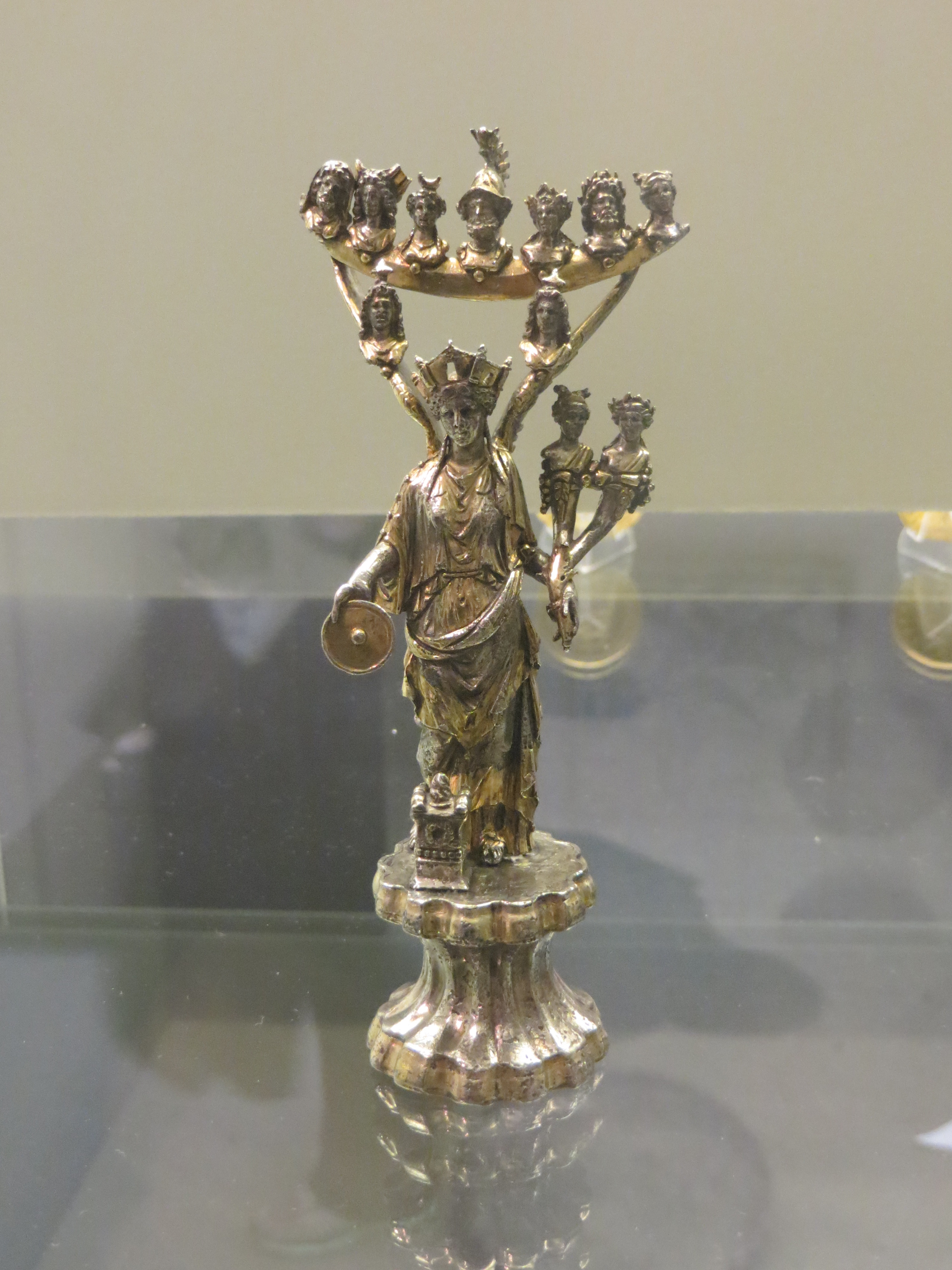
Tutela silver statuette from the Mâcon treasure.

The statue is believed to represent either a protective deity or the city's tutelary deity. The likelihood of identifying the statue with Tutela, a goddess with a prominent public profile, is exceptionally high, even considering the town of Aregenua.

In light of the statue's urban context, Pascal Vipard proposes that it may be identified with Fortuna Tyché, Genius Loci, or Tutela. According to Pascal Vipard, the statue, which features a tower and a cornucopia, would be an urban representation of Fortuna and should be named Aregenua. The local genius personified urban settlements.

Additionally, the Fortuna shares characteristics with Cybele, whose popularity persisted well into the Severan dynasty. However, Pascal Vipard notes that this goddess is less well documented in Gaul as the city's patron deity. However, the work discovered at Vieux-la-Romaine does not include any orientalizing elements.

Worship isn't just the domain of cities or municipal magistrates. Private individuals also engage in this practice. It is possible that this deity was associated with the imperial cult. The discovery attests to the city's integration into the prevailing religious thought of the Roman Empire.

=== Participation in an official decorating event ===
The house's large peristyle is an average example representing what might have existed elsewhere in Gaul or the West. However, the house excavations have revealed a rich and rare sculptural decoration. The owners employed an architectural and decorative style typical of public and private edifices, utilizing ornamentation to project their political influence or lineage.

It is not unexpected that a member of the local elite would have such a representation in their home. It is plausible that they would engage in worship directed towards their personified and divinized city, particularly in an official salon. The statue's presence in the house indicates that the space had a public function, which supports the idea that the decor was "officialized." This aristocratic building combined public and private elements, showcasing a bold and flashy style.

== See also ==
- Tutela
- Forum of Vieux-la-Romaine

== Bibliography ==
- Groud-Cordray, Claude (2007). La Normandie gallo-romaine (in French). Orep. ISBN 9782915762181.
- Vipard, Pascal (1998). La maison du « Bas de Vieux » une riche habitation romaine du quartier des thermes d'Aregenua (Vieux, Calvados) (in French). Service départemental d'archéologie du Calvados. ISBN 978-2-9506496-1-4.
- Vipard, Pascal (2002). La cité d'Aregenua (Vieux, Calvados) : chef-lieu des Viducasses. État des connaissances (in French). Exé Productions. ISBN 9782913993051.
- Deniaux, Élisabeth (2002). "La conquête et l'intégration à l'Empire romain". La Normandie avant les Normands: De la conquête romaine à l'arrivée des Vikings (in French). Ouest-France. ISBN 978-2737311178.
- Vipard, Pascal (1990). "Une statue récemment découverte à Vieux (Calvados)". Gallia (in French). Vol. 47. pp. 251–255. doi:10.3406/galia.1990.2910.
- Vipard, Pascal (2001). "Le rôle du décor dans les parties officielles d'une domus à péristyle du début du IIIe siècle : le cas de la Maison au Grand Péristyle (Vieux, Calvados)". Revue du Nord (in French) (5): 21–33. doi:10.3917/rdn.343.0021.
- Vipard, Pascal (1992). "Note sur une statue découverte à Vieux (Calvados)". L'Art en Basse-Normandie, actes du XXVIe congrès des sociétés historiques et archéologiques de Normandie. 1: 69–78.
