= Aelia Eudoxia =

Roman empress from 395 to 404

- Augusta
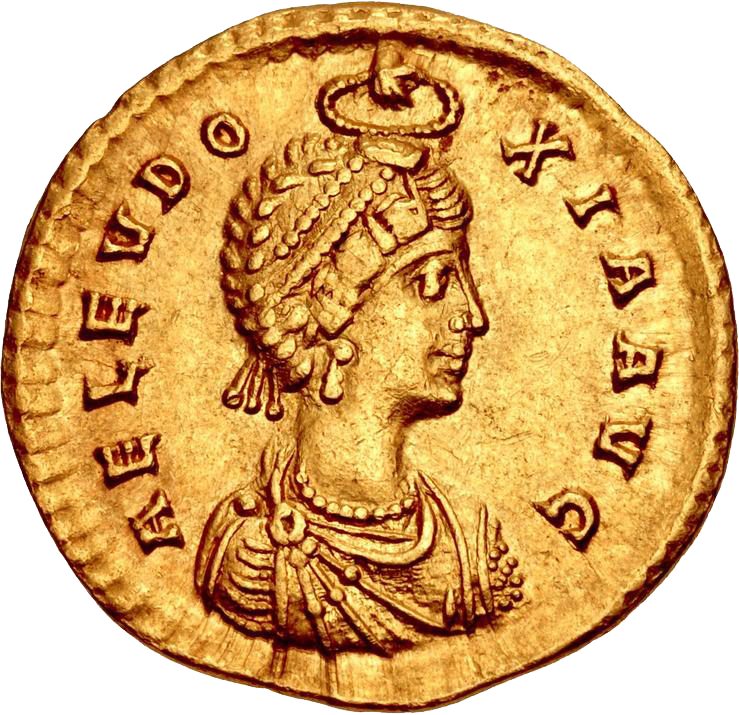
- Solidus of Eudoxia

Roman empress
- Tenure: 27 April 395 – 6 October 404
- Died: 6 October 404
- Burial: Church of the Holy Apostles
- Spouse: Arcadius (395 to death)
- Issue Detail: Flaccilla; Pulcheria; Arcadia; Theodosius II; Marina
- Dynasty: Theodosian
- Father: Bauto

Aelia Eudoxia (/ˈiːliə juˈdɒkʃə -ˈdɒksiə/; Latin: Aelia Eudoxia; Ancient Greek: Αἰλία Εὐδοξία; died 6 October 404) was an Eastern Roman empress by marriage to the Roman emperor Arcadius. The marriage was arranged by Eutropius, one of the eunuch court officials, who was attempting to expand his influence. As Empress, she came into conflict with John Chrysostom, the Patriarch of Constantinople, who denounced imperial and clerical excess. She had five children, four of whom survived to adulthood, including her only son, the future emperor Theodosius II, but she had two additional pregnancies that ended in either miscarriages or stillbirths and she died as a result of the latter one.

== Family ==
Eudoxia was a daughter of Flavius Bauto, a Romanised Frank who served as magister militum in the Western Roman army during the 380s. The History of the Later Roman Empire from the Death of Theodosius I to the Death of Justinian (1923) by J. B. Bury and the historical study Theodosian Empresses: Women and Imperial Dominion in Late Antiquity (1982) by Kenneth Holum consider her mother to be Roman and Eudoxia to be a "semibarbara", half-barbarian. However, the primary sources are silent on her maternal ancestry, though she would have been Roman.

== Early life ==
Aelia Eudoxia's father was last mentioned as Roman Consul with Arcadius in 385 and was already deceased by 388. According to Zosimus, Eudoxia started her life in Constantinople as a household member of Promotus, magister militum of the Eastern Roman Empire. She is presumed to have been orphaned at the time of her arrival. Her entry into the household of Promotus may indicate a friendship of the two magisters or a political alliance.

Promotus died in 391 and, according to Zosimus, he was survived by his widow Marsa and two sons, Arcadius and his younger brother Honorius, who were raised alongside the sons and co-emperors of Theodosius I. Zosimus asserts that Eudoxia lived alongside one of the surviving sons in Constantinople and is assumed to have already been acquainted with Arcadius during his years as junior partner to his father. Eudoxia was educated by Pansophius, who was later promoted to bishop of Nicomedia in 402.

== Marriage ==
On 17 January 395, Theodosius I died of oedema in Milan. Arcadius succeeded him in the Eastern Roman Empire and Honorius in the Western Roman Empire. Arcadius was effectively placed under the control of Rufinus, Praetorian prefect of the East. Rufinus reportedly intended to marry his daughter to Arcadius and establish his own relation to the Theodosian dynasty. Bury considers that "once the Emperor's father-in‑law he [Rufinus] might hope to become an Emperor himself."

However, Rufinus was distracted by a conflict with Stilicho, magister militum of the West. The wedding of Eudoxia to Arcadius was orchestrated by Eutropius, one of the eunuch officials serving in the Great Palace of Constantinople. Although one tale says that Eutropius presented Arcadius with a portrait of Eudoxia and expounded on her charms until Arcadius fell in love, in actuality the emperor would have already been familiar with Eudoxia for six or seven years, and his choice in empress would have been politically motivated.

The marriage took place on 27 April 395, without the knowledge or consent of Rufinus. For Eutropius it was an attempt to increase his own influence over the emperor and hopefully ensure the loyalty of the new empress to himself. Rufinus had been an enemy of Promotus and the surviving household of the magister militum, including Eudoxia, might have been eager to undermine him. Arcadius himself may have been motivated in asserting his own will over that of his regent. Zosimus reports that Arcadius was also influenced by the extraordinary beauty of his bride. Arcadius was approximately eighteen years old and Eudoxia may be presumed to be of an equivalent age.

== Empress ==
In the decade between her marriage and her death, Eudoxia gave birth to five surviving children. A contemporary source known as pseudo-Martyrius also reports two stillbirths. "Pseudo-Martyrius" is hostile to Eudoxia and is likely to have been Cosmas – a deacon baptized by John Chrysostom – and who was keen to link the stillbirths to divine punishment for the two exiles of John. The writer, Zosimus, also alleged that her son Theodosius was widely rumored to be the result of her affair with a courtier (Zosimus is also generally hostile to Eudoxia and the accuracy of his tale therefore suspect).

Eudoxia and Gainas, the new magister militum, are considered to have played a part in the stripping of all offices and subsequent execution of Eutropius in 399 – who was attempting to expand his own influence and power at court. However the extent and nature of her involvement are disputed. Nevertheless, she seems to have increased her personal influence following the execution of Eutropius. She also involved herself in legal matters, such as when the general Arbazacius bribed her in order that he avoid trial for his conduct during his campaign against the Isaurians. On 9 January 400, Eudoxia was officially given the title of an augusta. She was then able to wear the purple paludamentum representing imperial rank and was depicted in Roman coinage. Official images of her in the manner similar to a male Augustus also circulated. Her brother-in-law Honorius later complained to Arcadius about them reaching his own court.

The extent of her influence at matters of court and state has been a matter of debate among historians. Philostorgius considers her to be more intelligent than her husband but comments on her "barbarian arrogance". Zosimus considers her strong-willed but ultimately manipulated by eunuchs at court and the women of her environment. Barbarians and Bishops: Army, Church, and State in the Age of Arcadius and Chrysostom (1990) by J. W. H. G. Liebeschuetz considers her influence overestimated in primary sources while The Cambridge Ancient History XIII. The Late Empire A.D. 337–425 (1998) reports her dominating the government between 400 and her death in 404.

In 403, Simplicius, Prefect of Constantinople, erected a statue dedicated to her on a column of porphyry and a base of marble. Arcadius renamed the town of Selymbria (Silivri) Eudoxiopolis after her, though this name did not survive.

== Church policy ==
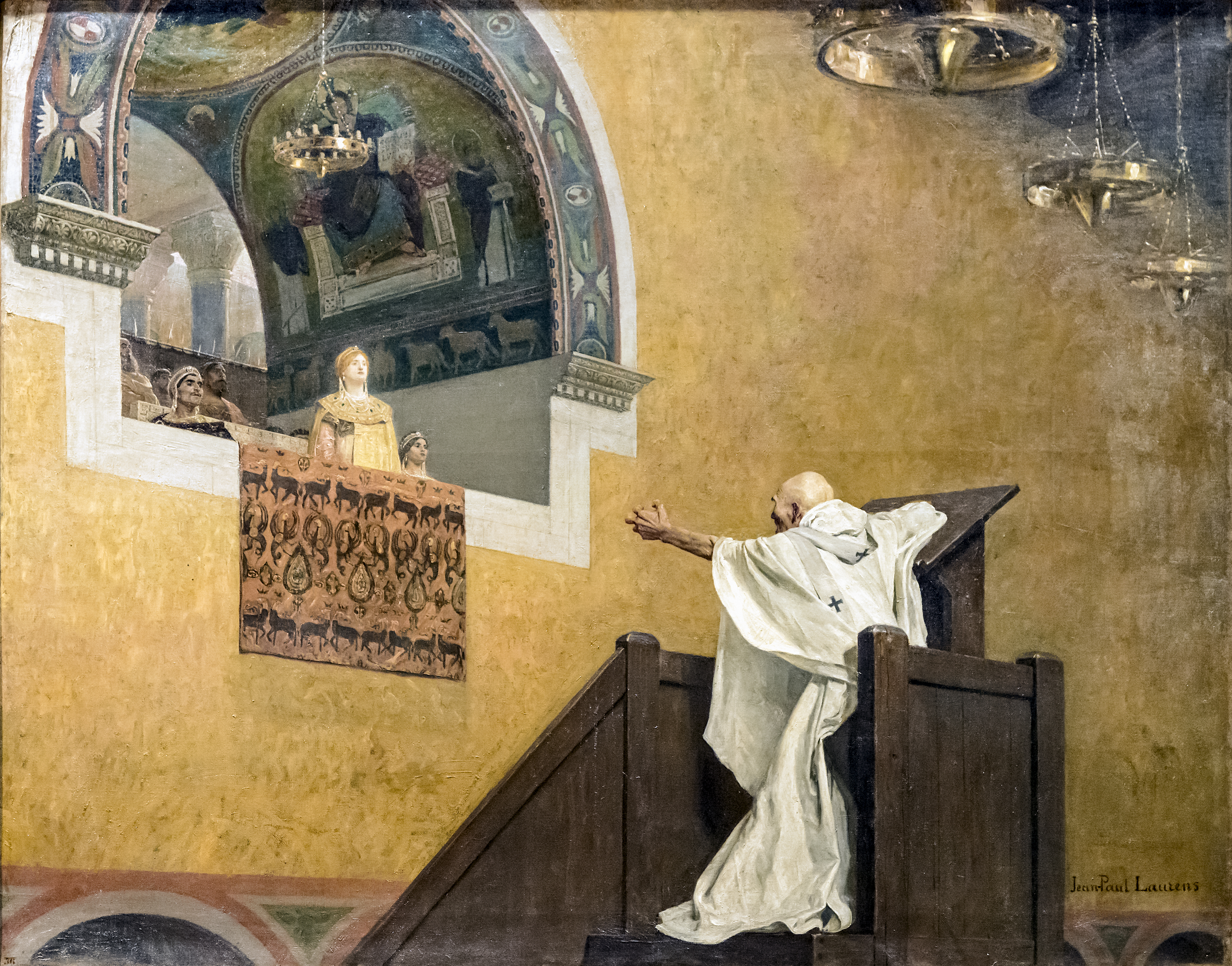
John Chrysostom confronting Aelia Eudoxia, in a 19th-century painting by Jean-Paul Laurens

Her role in the ecclesiastical affairs of her time is relatively well recorded. She became a patron to the faction of the Christian Church accepting the Nicene Creed and was reported by Socrates of Constantinople to have financed nighttime anti-Arian processions in Constantinople. She also presided in public celebrations over the arrival of new relics of Christian martyrs to the city and joined nightly vigils herself. She was consistently reported to act alone in religious matters; and her husband Arcadius generally remained absent from public events.

According to Mark the Deacon, Eudoxia welcomed Bishop Porphyry in 400, who promised her a son in return for her hospitality. Following the birth of Theodosius II, Eudoxia instructed Porphyry to bring a petition to the infant, which was "ordained" by the newborn. Eudoxia then sent head eunuch Amantius to find a "zealous Christian" to execute the new law and demolish pagan temples and intimidate the pagan populace of Gaza. Porphyry destroyed the temple of Marnas and constructed a basilica there in honor of the vow Eudoxia had made in her prayers for a son. Upon the completion of the basilica after Eudoxia's death, it was named Eudoxiané in her memory.

A possible reason for Eudoxia's presence in religious matters over her husband's is that Eudoxia had adopted the role of patron of the Church previously belonging to the Augusti from Constantine I onwards. Her role brought her into conflict with John Chrysostom, the Patriarch of Constantinople, particularly after he protested over the fall from power and execution of Eutropius (his ally at court).

During his time as Archbishop, John adamantly refused to host lavish social gatherings, which made him popular with the common people, but unpopular with wealthy citizens and the clergy. His reforms of the clergy were also unpopular with these groups. He ordered absentee priests to return to the churches they were meant to be serving – without any payout.

At about the same time, Theophilus, the Patriarch of Alexandria, wanted to bring Constantinople under his sway and opposed John's appointment to Constantinople. Being an opponent of Origen's teachings, he accused John of being too partial to the latter's teachings. Theophilus had disciplined four Egyptian monks (known as "the Tall Brothers") over their support of Origen's teachings. They fled to and were welcomed by John. John made another enemy in Eudoxia, who assumed (perhaps with justification) that his denunciations of extravagance in feminine dress were aimed at herself. An alliance was soon formed against him by Eudoxia, Theophilus and others. They held a synod in 403 (the Synod of the Oak) to charge John, in which his connection to Origen was used against him. It resulted in his deposition and banishment. He was called back by Arcadius almost immediately, as the people became "tumultuous" over his departure. There was also an earthquake the night of his arrest, which Eudoxia took for a sign of God's anger, prompting her to ask Arcadius for John's reinstatement.

Peace was short-lived. A silver statue of Eudoxia was erected near the city cathedral. John denounced the dedication ceremonies. He spoke against Eudoxia in harsh terms: "Again Herodias raves; again she is troubled; she dances again; and again desires to receive John's head in a charger," comparing himself to John the Baptist. (Note: Herodias was a member of the Herodian Dynasty. In the Gospels of Mark and Matthew, Herodias plays a major role in the execution of John the Baptist, using the dance of her daughter Salome before Herod Antipas and his party guests to ask for the head of the Baptist as a reward.)

Once again John was banished, this time to the Caucasus in Armenia, and he died there in exile in 407. Eudoxia did not survive long. Her seventh and last pregnancy ended in either a miscarriage or, according to pseudo-Martyrius, a second stillbirth. She was left bleeding and died of an infection shortly thereafter.

She was buried in the Church of the Holy Apostles in Constantinople, in a porphyry sarcophagus that was described in the 10th century by Constantine VII Porphyrogenitus in the De Ceremoniis.

== Children ==
Eudoxia and Arcadius had five known children. The main source about their births and deaths is the chronicle of Marcellinus Comes:

- Flacilla (born 17 June 397). Her birth was recorded by Marcellinus Comes. She predeceased her father. Only sibling not mentioned alive at his death in 408.
- Pulcheria (19 January 399 – 453). Married Marcian.
- Arcadia (3 April 400 – 444).
- Theodosius II (10 April 401 – 28 July 450).
- Marina (10 February 403 – 449).

If pseudo-Martyrius is to be believed, her two pregnancies (due late in 403 and late in 404, respectively) ended not in miscarriages, as previously supposed, but stillbirths, the second caused Eudoxia's death from hemorrhaging and infection.

== Legacy ==
Eudoxia is a featured figure on Judy Chicago's installation piece The Dinner Party, being represented as one of the 999 names on the Heritage Floor. She is listed under the Theodora place setting.

== See also ==
- List of Byzantine emperors
- List of Roman and Byzantine Empresses

== Bibliography ==
- Chicago, Judy. The Dinner Party: From Creation to Preservation. London: Merrell (2007). ISBN 1-85894-370-1
- Holum, Kenneth G. (1982). Theodosian Empresses: Women and Imperial Dominion in Late Antiquity. Berkeley, Los Angeles and London: University of California Press. ISBN 978-0-520-04162-2.
- Jones, A. H. M. (1992). The Prosopography of the Later Roman Empire: Volume 2, AD 395–527. Cambridge University Press. ISBN 9780521201599.
- Liebeschuetz, J. H. W. G. (1990). Barbarians and Bishops : Army, Church, and State in the Age of Arcadius and Chrysostom. New York: Oxford University Press. ISBN 978-0-1981-4073-3.

Royal titles
Preceded by Galla in the Western Roman Empire	Roman Empress; 395–404	Succeeded by Aelia Eudocia
