= Sedasa =

Town of ancient Isauria

Coordinates: 37°26′32″N 32°09′44″E

Sedasa was a town of ancient Isauria, inhabited in Roman times. The name does not occur among ancient authors but is inferred from epigraphic and other evidence.

Its site is located near Namze Yaylası, Asiatic Turkey.
