= Laroumada =

Town in the borderlands of ancient Isauria and Cilicia

Coordinates: 37°03′43″N 32°39′50″E

Laroumada was a town in the borderlands of ancient Isauria and Cilicia, inhabited in Roman times. The name does not occur among ancient authors but is inferred from epigraphic and other evidence.

Its site is located near Esenler, Asiatic Turkey.
