= Pedaia =

Town of ancient Isauria

Coordinates: 37°38′05″N 31°52′25″E

Pedaia was a town of ancient Isauria, inhabited in Roman times. The name does not occur among ancient authors but is inferred from epigraphic and other evidence.

Its site is tentatively located near Çiçekler, Asiatic Turkey.
