= Zaliche =

- town
- Location of Zaliche
- Coordinates: 41°36′36″N 35°35′42″E
- Country: Turkey

Zaliche (Greek: Ζαλίχη) or Zaliches (Ζαλίχης) was an ancient town in the late Roman province of Helenopontus.

== Name ==
"Zaliche" is the form given in the indices of the editions, produced by Peter Wesseling, and by B.G. Niebuhr It is the form given also in Anthon's Classical Dictionary On the other hand, the contributor (Leonhard Schmitz) of the entry on the town in William Smith's Dictionary of Greek and Roman Geography gives it the name "Zaliches". The Annuaire historique of the Société de l'histoire de France treats "Zaliches" instead as the genitive case of "Zaliche'. It appears that the city was at some time also called Leontopolis.

== History ==
The manuscripts of the Synecdemus list among the seven cities of Helenopontus one called Σάλτον Ζαλίχην, which Peter Wesseling believes should be corrected to Σάλτος Ζαλίχης and suggests it indicates that the city was surrounded by forests (Latin: saltus), making the name equivalent to "Forest of Zaliche".

At the Second Council of Nicaea in 787, a priest named Andronicus represented the Bishop John "Ζαλίχων", i.e., of Zaliche (Ζαλίχη, neuter plural). The priest is also called a priest Λεοντοπόλεως ἤτοι Ζαλίχου, an expression that treats "Leontopolis" as another name for the same town. Both Wesseling and the contributor to Smith's Geography also believe that this is the Leontopolis spoken of in Novella 28 as one of the cities of Helenopontus.

== Bishopric ==
The town was the seat of an ancient bishopric and remains today a vacant titular see. Leontopolis is first mentioned as a suffragan bishopric of Amaseia in the 6th century and, although declining, survived until the thirteenth. It is mentioned in the Notitia III and sent delegates to Second and Third Council of Constantinople. At times this city was merged with the bishopric centered on Isauropolis. but known bishops include:

- Metrodonus Council of Chalcedon
- John fl 787AD
- John II (879)
- Christopher (10th-11th century)
- Stephen of Leontopolis 10th century
- Leo of Leotopolis 11th century
- Elias Daniel von Sommerfeld † (13 Jun 1714 Appointed – 26 Jul 1742 Died)
- Joaquim de Nossa Senhora de Nazareth Oliveira e Abreu, O.F.M. † (4 Sep 1815 Appointed – 23 Aug 1819 Confirmed, Bishop of São Luís do Maranhão)
- Alexander Dobrzański † (17 Dec 1819 Appointed – 1831 Died)
- Ludwig Forweck † (11 Jul 1854 Appointed – 8 Jan 1875 Died)
- Jean-Pierre-François Laforce-Langevin † (13 Feb 1891 Appointed – 26 Jan 1892 Died)
- Dominique-Clément-Marie Soulé † (21 Mar 1893 Appointed – 21 Apr 1919 Died)
- Franz Xaver Eberle † (2 Jun 1934 Appointed - 19 Nov 1951 Died)
- Gustavo Posada Peláez, M.X.Y. † (24 Mar 1953 Appointed - 30 Apr 1990 Appointed, Bishop of Istmina-Tadó Colombia)

The seat has been vacant since April 30, 1990.

== Site ==
Modern scholars place the town at Alaçam, Samsun Province, Turkey.
