= Alaçam =

- District and municipality
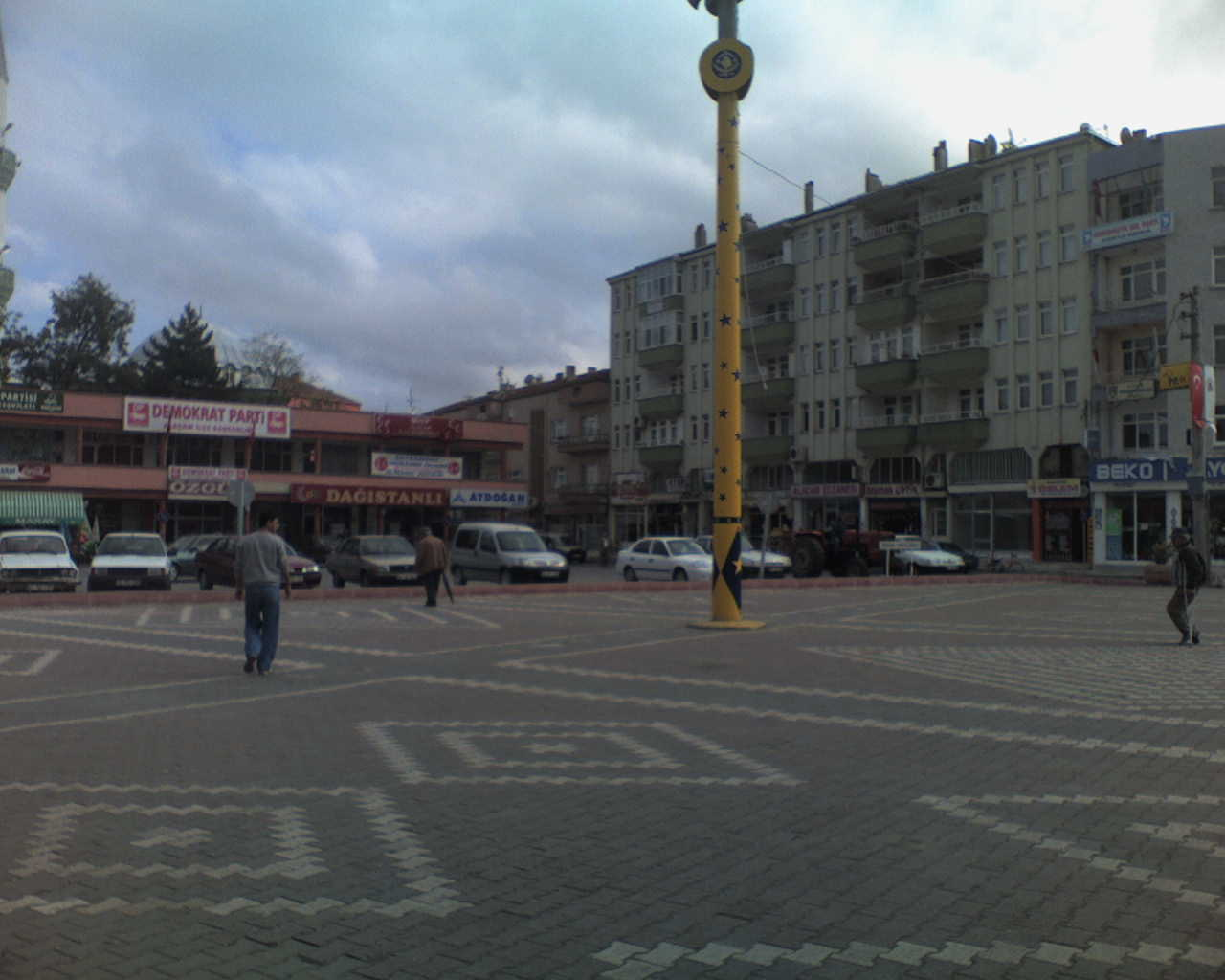

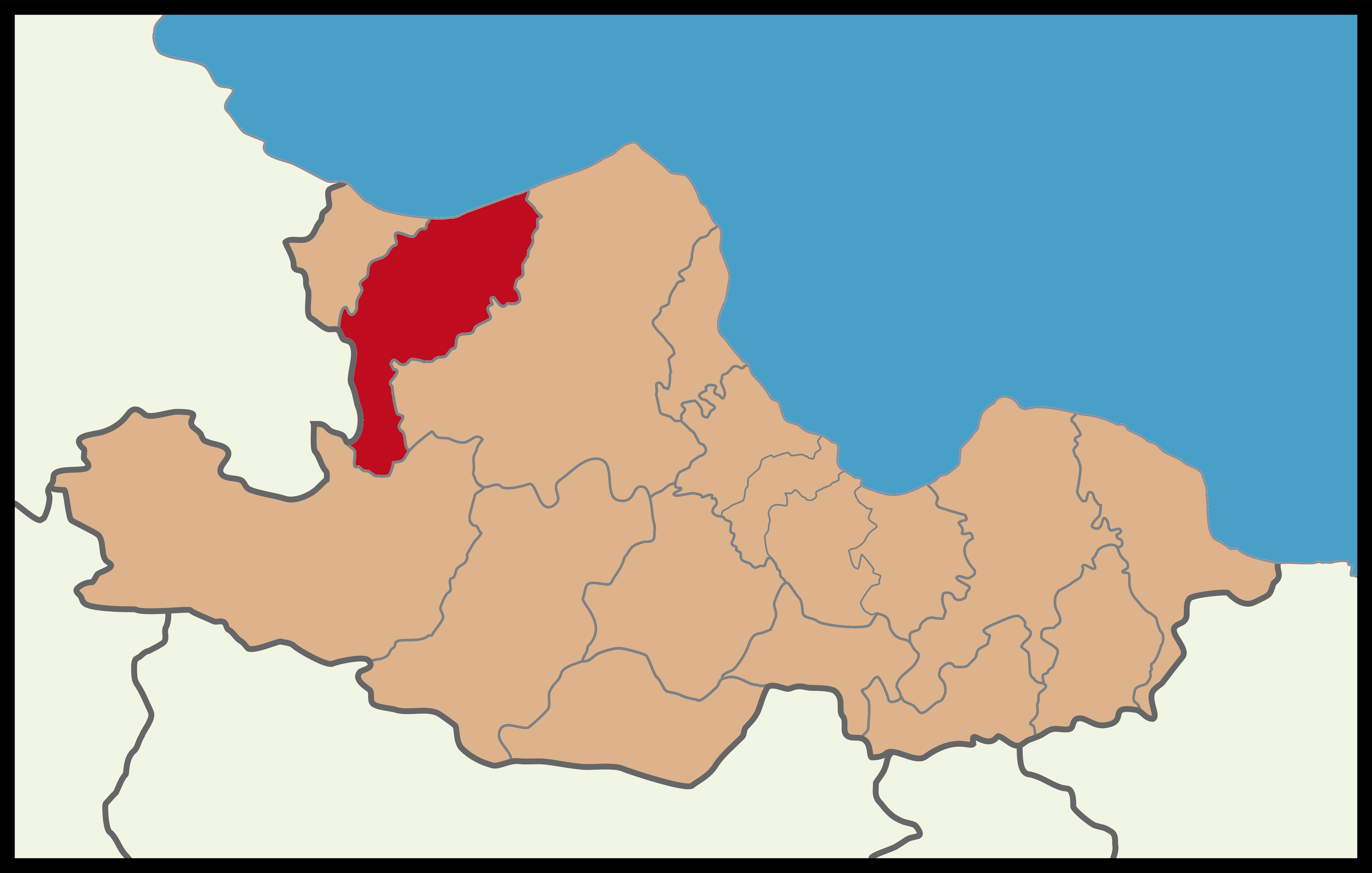
- Map showing Alaçam District in Samsun Province

- Location within Turkey
- Coordinates: 41°36′36″N 35°35′42″E
- Country: Turkey
- Province: Samsun

Government
  - Mayor: İlyas Acar (MHP)
- Area: 598 km^{2} (231 sq mi)
- Population (2022): 24,647
  - Density: 41.2/km^{2} (107/sq mi)
- Time zone: UTC+3 (TRT)
- Postal code: 55800
- Area code: 0362
- Climate: Cfa
- Website: www.alacam.bel.tr

Alaçam is a municipality and district of Samsun Province, Turkey. Its area is 598 km^{2}, and its population is 24,647 (2022). Scholars believe that Alaçam is the site of the ancient city of Zaliche or Zaliches.

== History ==
Alaçam has a long history. It has been held by Phrygian, Cimmerians, Lydians and Persians before the area was taken by Alexander the Great. The Pontus Kingdom came in the 1st century BC which was in turn annexed by the Roman Empire. After the division of the Roman Empire, the Byzantines called the town Zalikus.

The Seljuk named the town Uluköy, until 1385 when it was briefly part of the Candaroğulları Beyliği rump state and it took the name of the Alaçam county. The name Alaçam means spruce from the pine trees endemic to the area. Then in 1398 Alaçam entered the Ottoman Empire, becoming a Turkish town after World War I.

== Economy ==
Alaçam County's economy relies mainly on agriculture and animal husbandry. Like most of the region Tobacco is the leading agricultural product. In addition to this wheat, rice, corn and nuts production will follow. It also has some raising fruits and vegetables. being on the Black Sea coast fishing is also done. In animal husbandry and livestock farming is carried out. Approximately 6200 farmers engaged in tobacco farming.

== Composition ==
There are 65 neighbourhoods in Alaçam District:

- Akbulut
- Akgüney
- Alidedebölmesi
- Alpaslan
- Aşağıakgüney
- Aşağıısırganlı
- Aşağıkoçlu
- Bahşioymağı
- Bekiroğlu
- Çeşme
- Demircideresi
- Doğankent
- Doyran
- Esentepe
- Etyemez
- Fatih
- Göçkün
- Gökçeağaçoymağı
- Gökçeboğaz
- Gülkaya
- Gültepe
- Gümüşova
- Güvenli
- Habilli
- Harmancık
- İncirli
- Kadıköy
- Kalıkdemirci
- Kapaklı
- Karaçukur
- Karahüseyinli
- Karlı
- Karşıyaka
- Killik
- Kışlakonak
- Kızlan
- Köseköy
- Madenler
- Örenli
- Ortaköy
- Pelitbükü
- Pelitbüküsekicek
- Sancar
- Sarılık
- Şirinköy
- Soğukçam
- Taşkelik
- Tefekli
- Tepebölmesi
- Terskırık
- Toplu
- Umutlu
- Uzunkıraç
- Vicikler
- Yakacık
- Yenicami
- Yenice
- Yeniköy
- Yeşilköy
- Yoğunpelit
- Yukarıelma
- Yukarıısırganlı
- Yukarıkoçlu
- Yukarısoğukçam
- Zeytinköy

== Attractions ==
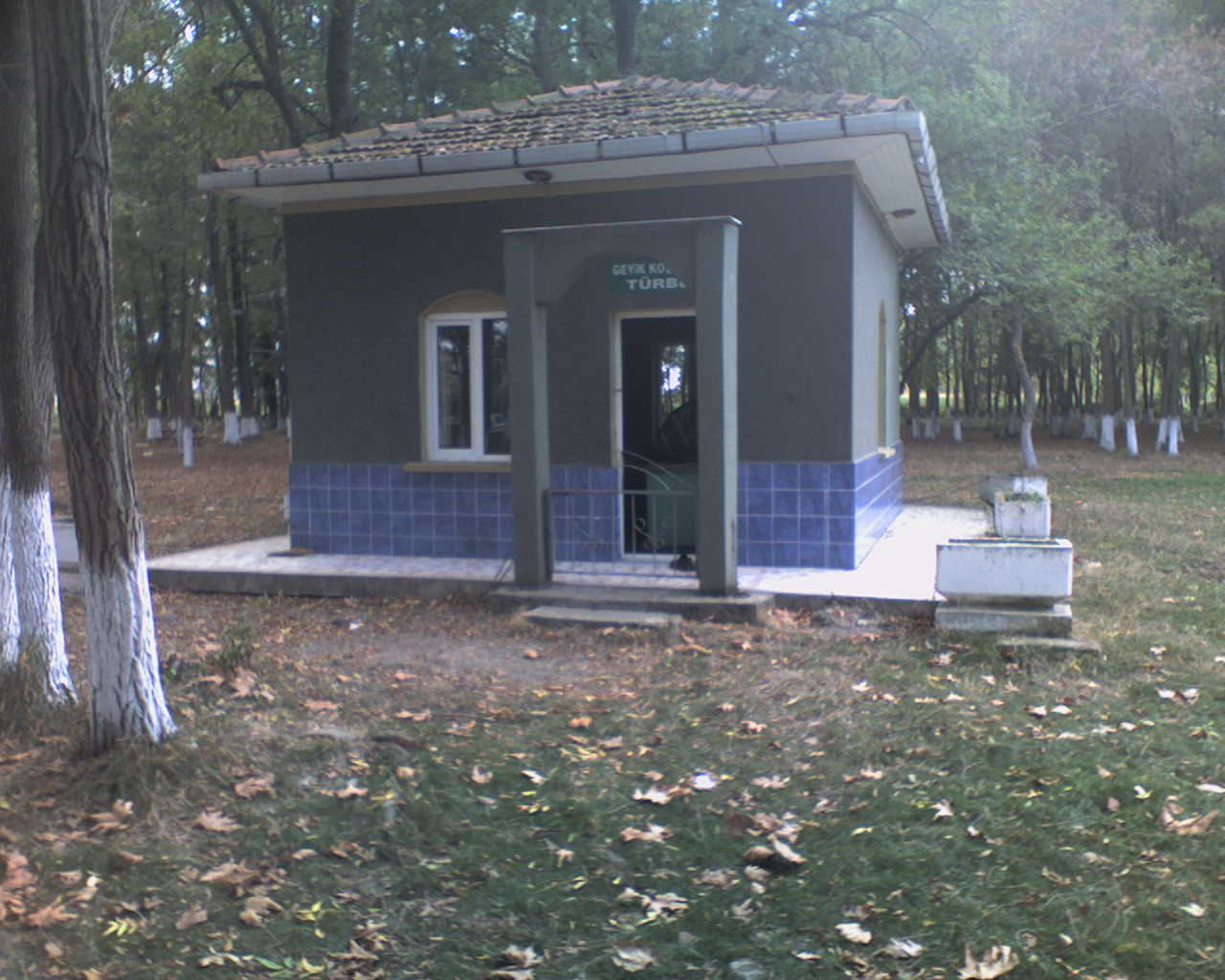
Geyikkoşan tomb.

Alaçam is known for its natural environment. 2km north of the town by the Black Sea beaches are groves of sycamore and poplar trees which take their name from Geyikkoşan Baba's Tomb said to be in the woods. This is both as a picnic area and is a place to swim.

In the south of the town at an altitude of 1,500 m is the Dürtmen Yaylası Plateau, which is also a recreational area. A portion of the Kızılırmak River delta is within the boundaries of the district.

On May 6 the Hidirellez Festival are held annually. This festival sees national amateur wrestlers competitions. It is said that the origin of the festival is based on a 600-year legend according to which an Arab army commander position gave beef portions to the poor people of the town. The plateau is a place where people living in Alaçam come at leisure. Tourists can stay here.

== Population ==
Year	Residents
2009	30,351
2013	28,162
2017	25,577
2022	24,647
