= Baths of Arcadius =

The Baths of Arcadius (Latin: Thermae Arcadiane) was a Roman bath built during the year 394 in Constantinople, the capital of the Eastern Roman Empire. It is unknown whether the baths were founded by Emperor Arcadius, or by his daughter, Arcadia. Some suggest Arcadia and another woman named Marina were responsible for the construction of the baths. Alternatively, Arcadius began the construction of the baths, and Arcadia finished it. Once finished, the baths were located where the seraglio would be built. This bath was renovated by Emperor Justinian.
