= Isaura Nea =

Roman and Byzantine settlement in Asia Minor

Coordinates: 37°11′37″N 32°20′33″E

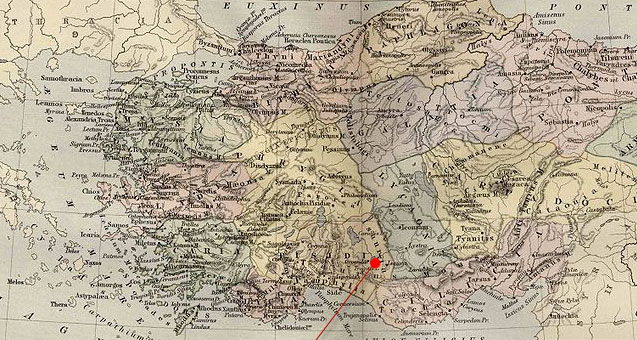
Location of Isauria in Asia Minor

Isaura Nea (Ancient Greek: Ἴσαυρα Νέα), in Latin Isaura Nova, both meaning 'New Isaura', was a town of the Roman and Byzantine era, so called in juxtaposition with the settlement of Isaura Palaea. It also bore the name Leontopolis, and in later days was included in the province of Lycaonia.

Along with Isaura Palaea (Old Isaura), the city was one of the two major settlements of the Isauria (Ἰσαυρία) region, located in what is now southern Turkey. Its site is identified with the ruins of Zengibar Castle, located approximately 19 km east of Bozkır district in Konya Province, near Hacılar village.

== History ==
Isaura Nea was the successor settlement to Isaura Palaea ('Old Isaura'), which had been destroyed by the Roman Servilius Isauricus (c. 75 BCE), and ceded by Rome to Amyntas of Galatia, who built out of the ruins of Isaura Palaea a new city in the neighbourhood, which he surrounded with a wall; but he did not live to complete the work. In the 3rd century, Isaura Nea was the residence of the rival emperor Trebellianus; but in the time of Ammianus Marcellinus nearly all traces of its former magnificence had vanished.

== Bishopric of Leontopolis ==
The city was the seat of an ancient bishopric and is mentioned in all the Notitiae Episcopatuum of the Byzantine era. In the mid Byzantine period the city bishopric was merged with the older neighbouring bishopric of Isauropolis.

The Isaurian church was originally under the authority of the Patriarch of Antioch, but was attached to the Patriarch of Constantinople in the late 7th or early 8th century.

Epitaphs have been found of three bishops, Theophilus, Sisamoas, and Mamas, who lived between the years 250 and 400. Three other bishops are also known, Hilarius, 381; Callistratus, somewhat later; Aetius, 451. The last named bishop also bears the title of Isauropolis, the name of a city which also figures in the Hierocles's Synecdemus. As no Notitiae Episcopatuum make mention of Isauropolis, Ramsay supposes that the Diocese of Isauropolis was early joined with that of Isaura Palaea which is mentioned in all the Notitiae.

Following its decline due to Turkoman invasions, the archbishopric of Leontopolis was assumed by the metropolis of Side.

The bishopric remains a titular see of the Roman Catholic church.
