= Arbazacius =

Arbazacius (Greek: Ἁρβαζάκιος, fl. early 5th century) was an Eastern Roman general who pacified Isauria during the reign of Emperor Arcadius (r. 383–408).

== Biography ==
Arbazacius is usually described as being born in Armenia from an Isaurian family, but it has also been argued that he was born in Isauria and was of Armenian descent. Around 404 AD, with Isaurian raiders beginning their raids into southern and eastern Asia Minor, Arbazacius was placed in command of the Roman forces with instructions to clear Isaurian brigands from Pamphylia. Although the exact nature of his appointment remains unknown, it has been speculated that he held the rank of comes rei militaris.

Arbazacius managed to defeat the brigands, pursuing them back to their mountain homelands in Isauria, where he proceeded to destroy a large number of their villages, killing many Isaurians in the process. His campaign in Isauria saw him accumulate a great deal of booty, but instead of continuing the pacification of their homelands, he used the spoils to live a life of luxury, and attempted to increase his wealth by extracting more money from the population. When word reached the imperial court at Constantinople, he was recalled to answer questions about his conduct. Arbazacius managed to avoid trial by bribing the empress Aelia Eudoxia, after which he lived the rest of his life in extravagant ease supported by the treasure he accumulated in Isauria.

Arbazacius was described as having an overindulgent taste for wine, women, and money, and was accused of having numerous mistresses, even while on campaign. As a result of his greed, his name was mockingly altered by contemporaries to Harpazacius (Greek: Ἁρπαζάκιος, "the grabber").

== Sources ==
- Bury, John Bagnell (1958) [1923]. History of the Later Roman Empire: From the Death of Theodosius I to the Death of Justinian, Volume 2. Mineola, New York: Dover Publications. OCLC 41478187.
- Martindale, John R., ed. (1980). The Prosopography of the Later Roman Empire: Volume II, AD 395–527. Cambridge: Cambridge University Press. ISBN 0-521-20159-4.
- Woods, David (1998). "Arbazacius, Fravitta, and the Government of Isauria ca. AD 396–404". Phoenix. 52 (1–2). Toronto, Canada: Classical Association of Canada: 109–119. doi:10.2307/1088249. JSTOR 1088249.
