= Isaura Palaea =

Roman and Byzantine era town in southern Turkey

Coordinates: 37°11′24″N 32°14′42″E

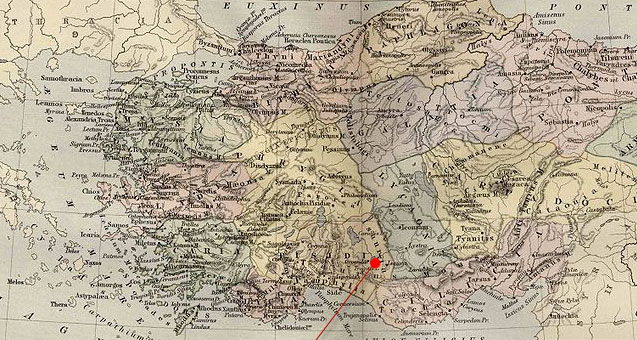
Location of Isauria in Asia Minor.

Isaura Palaea (Ancient Greek: Ἴσαυρα Παλαιά, romanized: Isaura Palaia), in Latin Isaura Vetus, both meaning Old Isaura, and perhaps identical to Isauropolis (Ancient Greek: Ἰσαυρόπολις), was a Roman and Byzantine era town in southern Turkey. In antiquity the city was in Isauria (Ἰσαυρία) district of Lycaonia in today's southern Turkey (modern Konya Province). Its site is identified as near Bozkır.

Possibly also known as Isaura Vetus, the city was in the Anatolian countryside of what was Lycaonia in today's southern Turkey and may have been the chief town of Isauria (Ἰσαυρία) district. The town was mentioned by Sozomen, Ptolemy, and Heirocles. About 450 Maximinus entered the town in his war with Zeno. Its location is not known, but suggestions include Siristat or Tris Maden, about 13 mi (21 km) west of Isaura, or Isaura Vetus. It must have been near Isaura Nova with which it was joined.

The city has been identified with modern Zengibar Kalesi, Bozkır, Konya Province.

== History ==
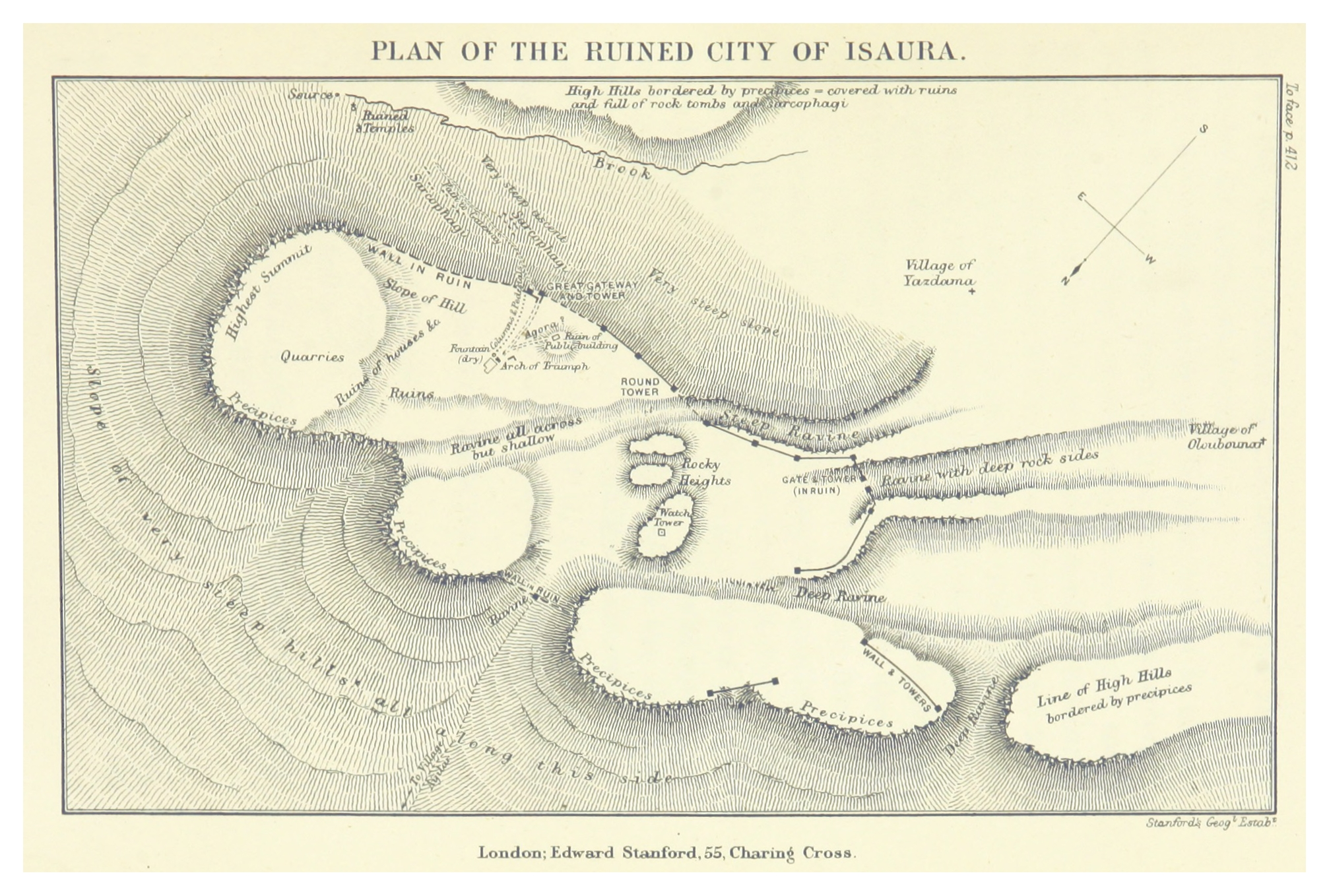
Plan of the ruins of Isaura (Davis, 1879)

Before the Romans the town was a strongly fortified city of the Isaurians, located at the foot of Mt. Taurus. It was besieged by Perdiccas, the Macedonian regent after Alexander the Great's death, the Isaurians set the place alight and let it perish in flames rather than submit to capture. Large quantities of molten gold were found afterwards by the Macedonians among the ashes and ruins. The town was rebuilt, but was destroyed a second time by the Roman, Servilius Isauricus (c. 75 BCE), and thenceforth it remained a heap of ruins. Strabo states that the place was ceded by the Romans to Amyntas of Galatia. It was rebuilt by Amyntas at a new location and called Isaura Nea ('New Isaura').

From 492-496 the area was fought over between emperor Anastasius I and the local rebels, in what was to become known as the Isaurian War.

The Seljuq Turks managed to take control of the area in the late 11th century, after the Battle of Manzikert.

== Bishopric ==
The city was also the site of an ancient bishopric which dates from the early Christian era. Bishops from here attended both Council of Nicea and Chalcedon. There is no mention of Isauropolis in any Notitiae episcopatuum, so Ramsay supposes that the Diocese was joined with that of Leontopolis which is mentioned in all the "Notitiae". The see was resurrected in 1925 as a titular see of the Roman Catholic Church.

=== Known bishops ===
Ancient bishopric

- Silvanus of Isauropolis at Council of Nicaea
- Ilyrius of Isauropolis (Council of Constantinople 381)
- Aetius, 451

Titular see

- Bernard Gozdzki Auxiliary Bishop in Poznań (Poland-Lithuania) July 6, 1722 – March 16, 1725.
- Gregorio de Molleda y Clerque September 26, 1725 – August 3, 1729
- Louis-Mathias-Joseph de Barral Coadjutor Bishop of Troyes (France) September 15, 1788 – December 22, 1790
- Michele Di Pietro (February 21, 1794 – August 9, 1802)
- Jean-Louis Taberd MEP Vicar Apostolic of Cochin (Vietnam) September 18, 1827 – July 31, 1840
- Dominique Lefebvre (Vicar Apostolic of Western Cochin) (Vietnam) December 10, 1839 – April 30, 1865.
- Tomás Badía January 19, 1842 – September 10, 1844
- Stanislas-Gabriel-Henri Baudry Apostolic Vicar of Ningyüan (Republic of China) March 18, 1927 – April 11, 1946.
- Jean-Baptiste Urrutia MEP Apostolic Vicar of Hue (Vietnam) February 21, 1948 – November 24, 1960.
- Philip Francis Pocock (February 18, 1961 – March 30, 1971)
