= Zengibar Castle =

Ancient fortification in Bozkır, Turkey

Coordinates: 37°11′28″N 32°21′13″E

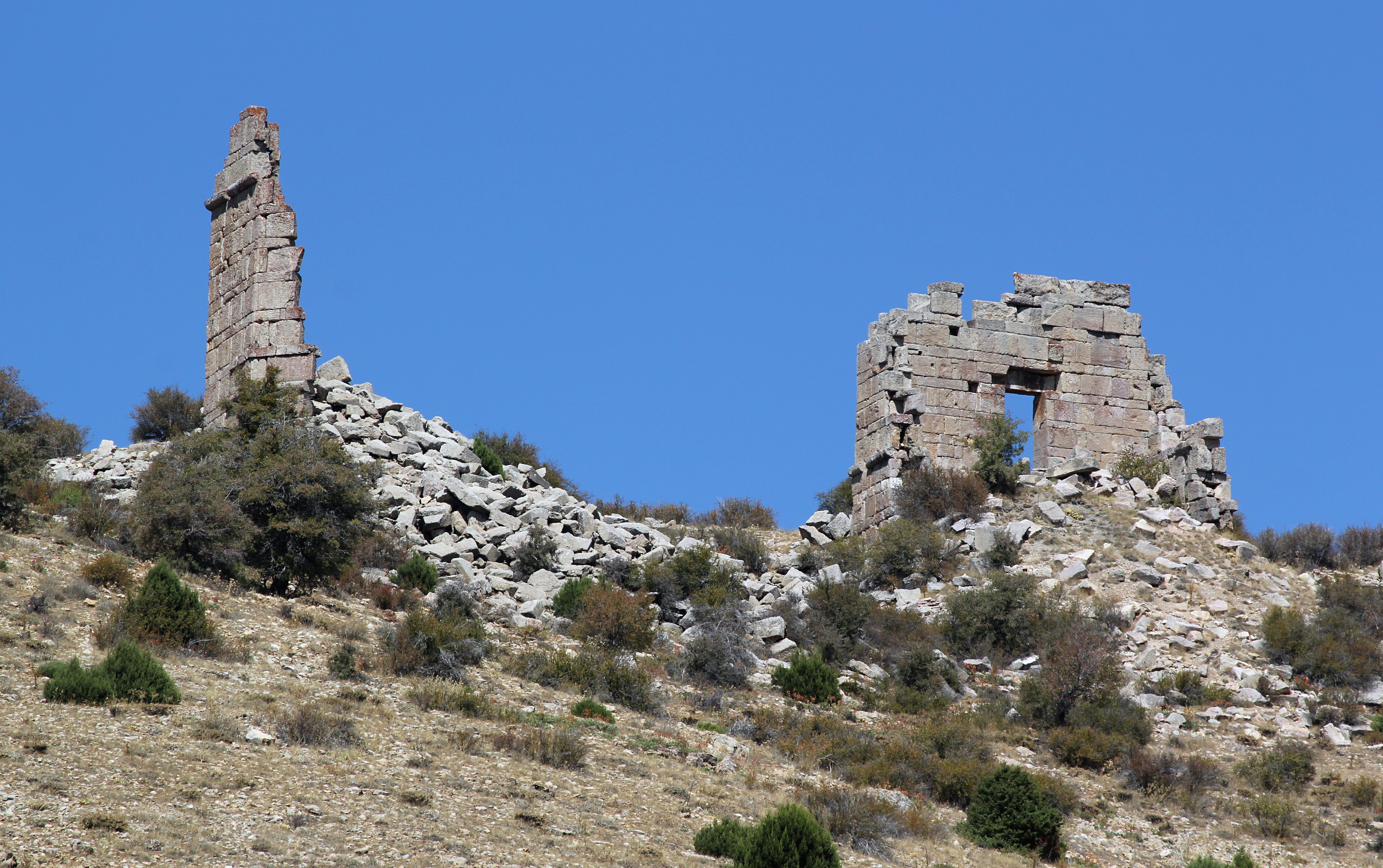
Ruins of Isaura

Zengibar Castle is an ancient ruined fortification on Mount Asar, approximately 20 km west of the town of Bozkır, Konya Province, Turkey.

== History ==
The castle is believed to be the site of the ancient settlement Isaura Palaea. The ruins are situated on a hill 1,800 meters in height, and surrounded by cliffs on three sides. The ancient site has been called 'The Ephesus of Konya', and the fortress had been used by the Hittites and Persians before the area became a part of the Roman Empire. The site is known for its impressive stonemasonry, with blocks being brought from a quarry at the summit of the mountain.

The area was controlled by Galatian king Amyntas during the 1st century BC until his death in 25 BC.

== Excavations ==
According to the Vehbi Koç Foundation, "Zengibar Castle was discovered in 1837 by the British traveler and geologist William Hamilton. In the late 1920s, a group led by the art historian and archaeologist Heinrich Swoboda determined the characteristics of a large number of structures in the city and attempt to reconstruct a number of them. The ruins were officially registered following a decision by the Konya Culture and Natural Heritage Preservation Board in 1988 and its borders as the Grade I and III Protected Site were defined in 2006."

The castle has been excavated by archaeologist Dr. Osman Doğanay since 2010 and the archaeological research has received support from the Vehbi Koç Foundation since 2014. The castle is probably the site of the city of Isaura Vetus, mentioned by Strabo.

According to the Archaeology Department of Aksaray University, "Studies are carried out for the “Surface Analyses of Zengibar Castle (Isaura)”, which were started by the courtesy of Ministry of Culture and Tourism in 2010 and which significantly progressed with the works of 2016, to continue as an “Excavation and Restoration Project” in the forthcoming years. Under the presidency of the Konya Directorate of Museums, cleaning operations were also carried out in the ancient city during the 2013-2014 studies of the surface analyses which continued for 6 years."
