= Tutela =

Roman goddess and personification of guardianship

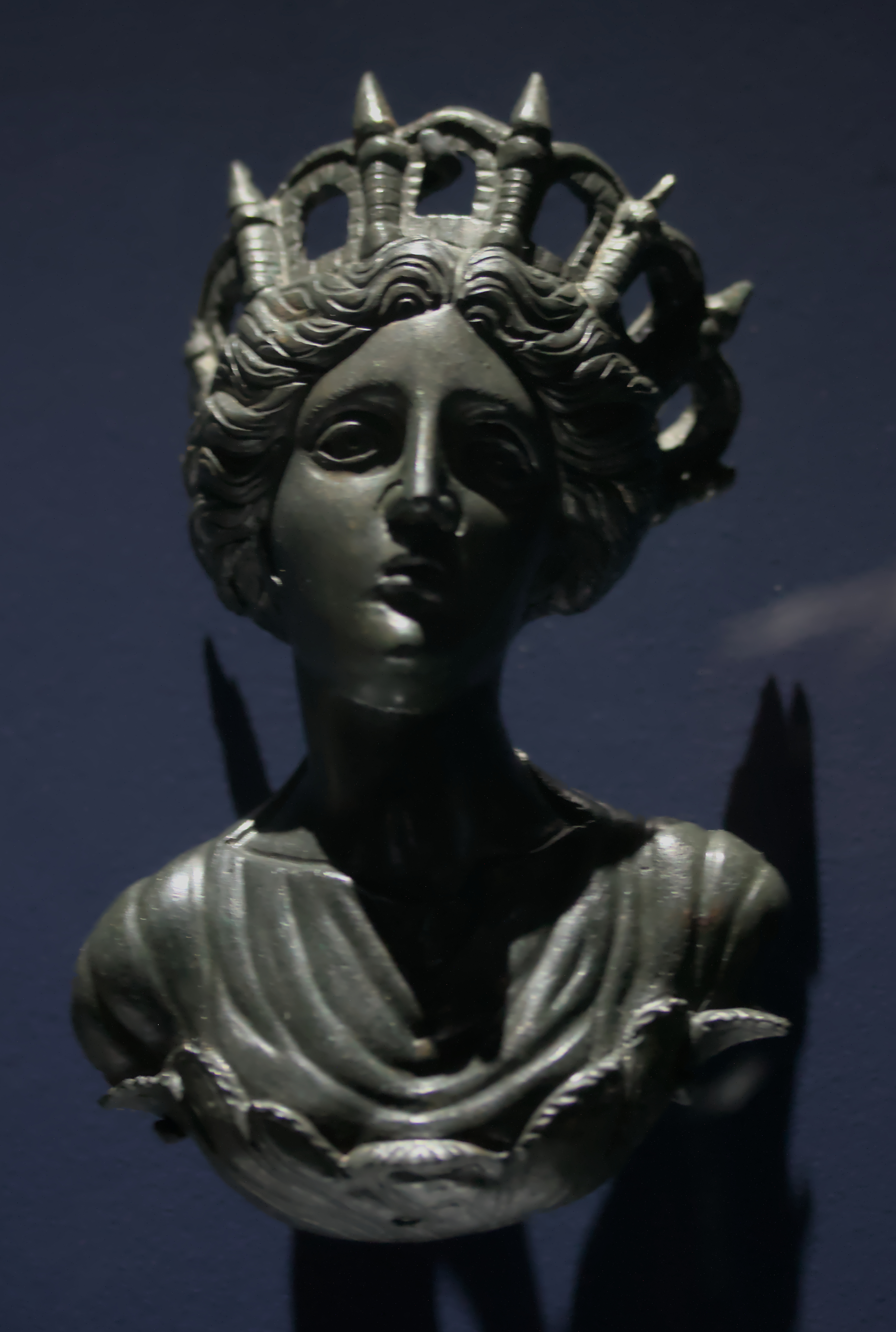
Bust of Tutela from the Martigny mithraeum

In ancient Roman culture and mythology, Tutela was a goddess and divine personification of "guardianship." As a concept, tutela had specific applications under Roman law.

== Legal tutela ==
Under Roman law, there were several forms of tutela ("guardianship" or "tutelage"), mainly for people such as minors and women who ordinarily in Roman society would be under the legal protection and control of a paterfamilias, but who for whatever reasons were sui iuris, legally emancipated. The guardian who oversaw their interests was a tutor. Latin legal terminology distinguishes among several types of tutela, including:

- tutela fiduciaria, fiduciary guardianship.
- tutela impuberum, guardianship for minors who were emancipated from the legal control (potestas) of a paterfamilias or head of household.
- tutela mulierum, guardianship of emancipated women, generally those whose fathers had died. In the "core period" of Roman history (2nd century BC to 2nd century AD), a married woman did not enter into the potestas of her husband, and remained legally a part of her birth family. The appointment of a tutor was meant to ensure that her interests and those of her family were protected, particularly in matters of property rights, since the ownership of property by married people remained separate. On occasion, a woman who wanted her husband to manage her property might have him appointed tutor.

== Tutelae ==
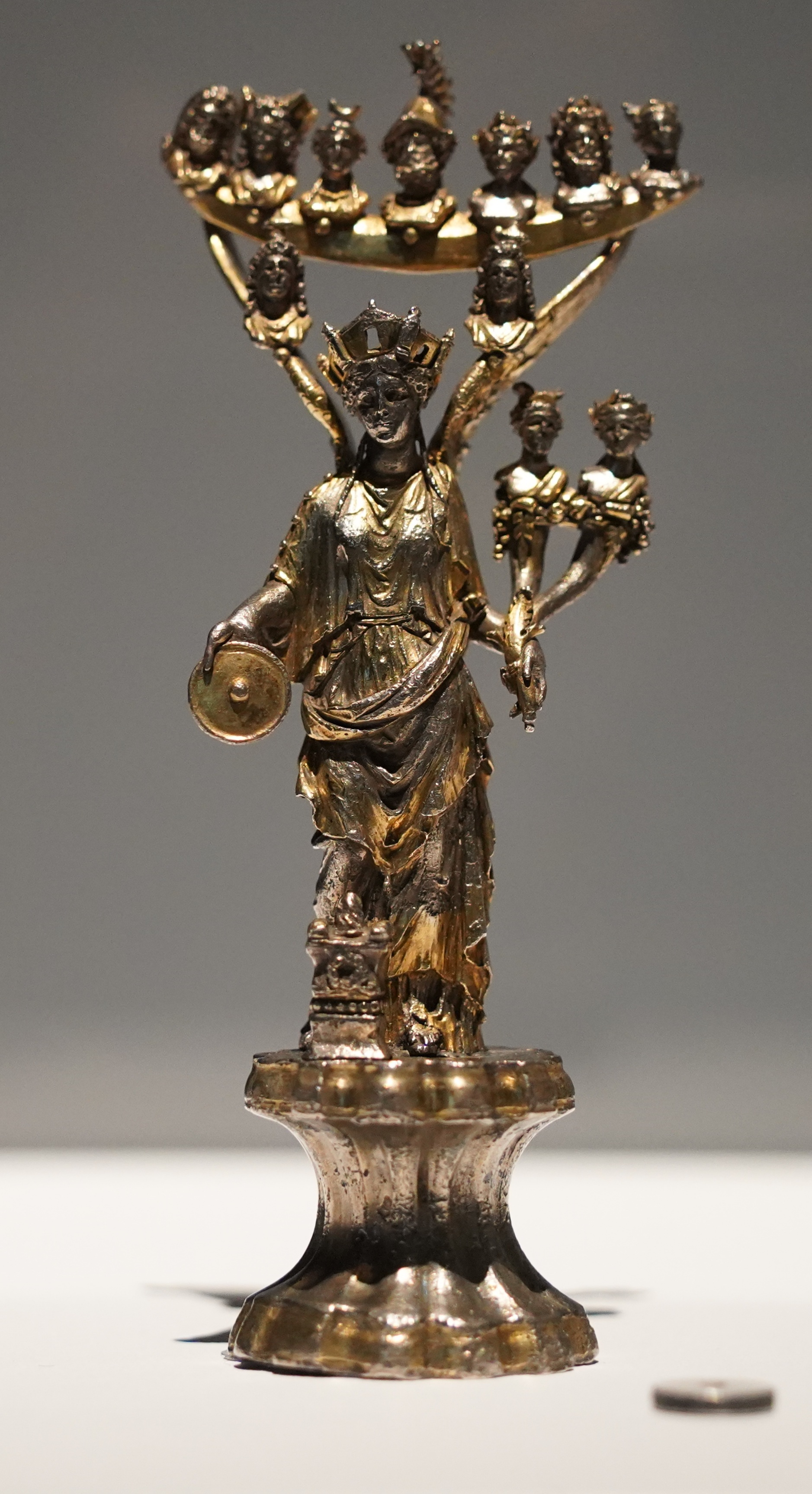
Gallo-Roman Tutela holding a patera in her right hand, Apollo and Diana in a twinned cornucopia in her left hand, with the twins Castor and Pollux on either side of her head, and bearing on her wings the seven deities of the days of the week (Saturn, Sol, Luna, Mars, Mercury, Jupiter and Venus), from the Mâcon treasure (AD 150-220)

The tutela or tutelary deity was fundamental to archaic Roman religion. The capacity for offering protection or guardianship was a basic function of deity, expressed by formulations such as Tutela Iovis, "the tutelage of Jove". Major deities such as Jupiter, Minerva, and Mars were conceived of as tutelaries. The phrase in tutela expressed the sphere of influence exercised by a deity. For instance, trees of ill omen (arbores infelices) were in the tutela of the gods below (di inferi). The initiatory grades of the Mithraic mysteries seem to have each had a tutelary deity.

The cities of ancient Italy characteristically had a tutela, who in many places was Juno. The true name of the deity was theoretically kept secret, to prevent an enemy from enacting a ritual "calling out" (evocatio) the tutelary and rendering the city vulnerable. If the identity of a deity whose protection was desired was unknown, an altar might be inscribed with an open-ended invocation such as "to the tutelary god". The individual goddess Tutela may have evolved from this abstraction. She appears often in inscriptions, particularly in Gaul, but only rarely in literature. She is often linked invoked with the Genius to assure a full range of protection, and became a regular part of household cult along with the Lares and Penates. She might also be paired with Fortuna. Tutor or tutator might be masculine epithets for gods in a specifically tutelary function: Iuppiter tutor or Hercules tutator.

== Tutela and Imperial cult ==
The early Roman emperors drew on traditional sources of authority to consolidate their position, among them the potestas or power of the Roman head of household. Tutela or guardianship was another available form of authority, advertised as Tutela Augusti, the tutelage of Augustus. In the Imperial period the goddess Tutela received her own distinct cultus in the form of rituals and temples. The Flavian dynasty in particular cultivated Tutela. On a coin of 71 AD, Tutela is represented by a woman with two children.
