= Isauria =

Ancient district of South Asia Minor

- Ancient region of Anatolia
- Location: South-Western Anatolia
- Language: Isaurian
- Biggest city: Isaura Palaea
- Persian satrapy: Phrygia/Intermittently independent along with Pisidia
- Roman province: Galatia
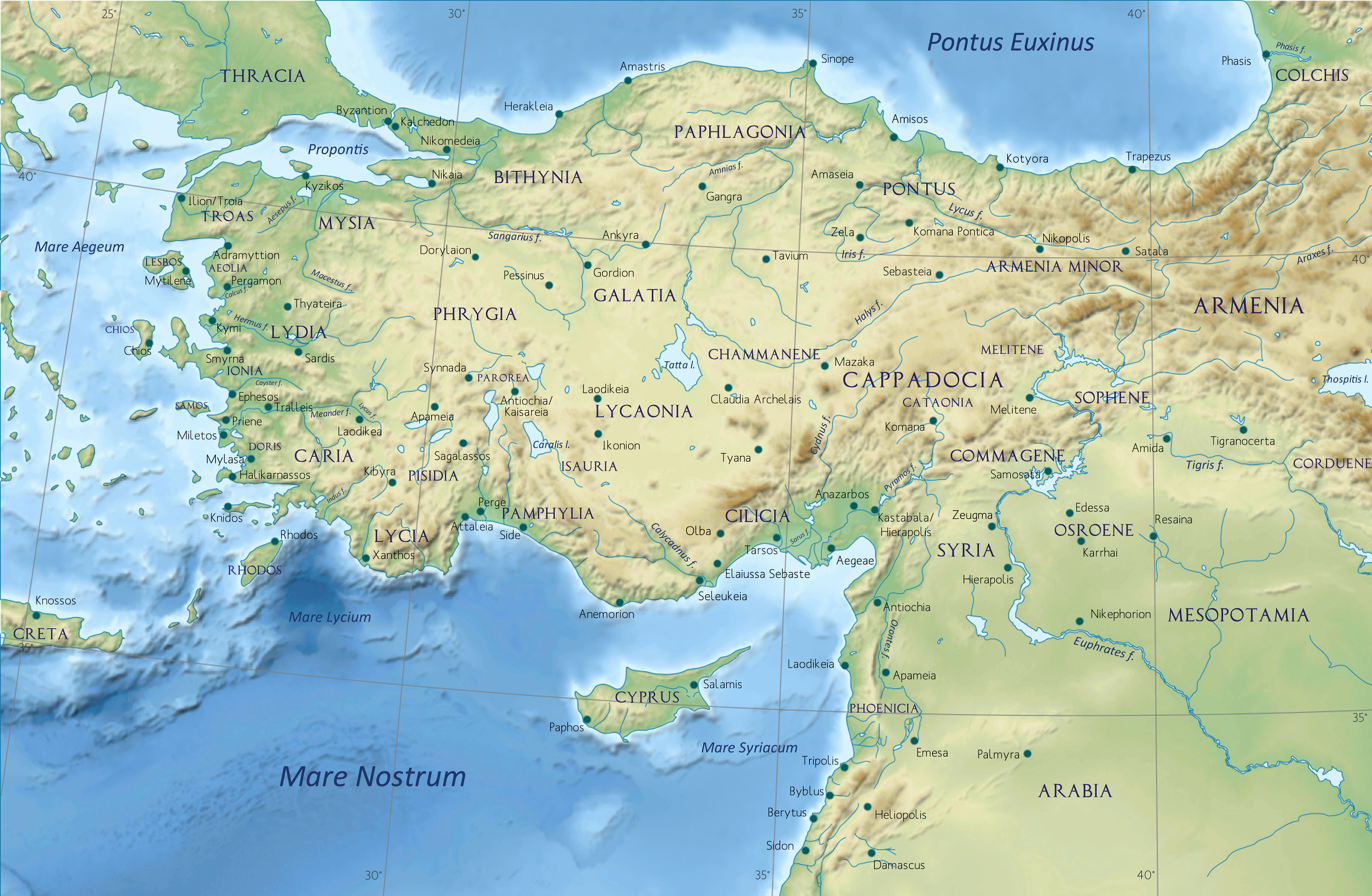
- Asia Minor/Anatolia in the Greco-Roman period. The classical regions and their main settlements, including Isauria.

Isauria (/aɪˈzɔːriə/ or /aɪˈsɔːriə/; Latin: Isauria; Ancient Greek: Ἰσαυρία), in ancient geography, is a rugged, isolated district in the interior of Asia Minor, of very different extent at different periods, but generally covering what is now the district of Bozkır and its surroundings in the Konya Province of Turkey, or the core of the Taurus Mountains. In its coastal extension it bordered on Cilicia.

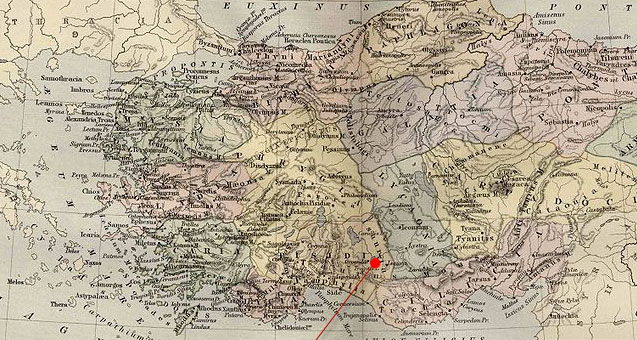
Location of Isauria in Asia Minor

It derives its name from the warlike Isaurian tribe and the twin settlements Isaura Palaea (Ἰσαυρα Παλαιά, Latin: Isaura Vetus 'Old Isaura') and Isaura Nea (Ἰσαυρα Νέα, Latin: Isaura Nova 'New Isaura').

The Isaurians were fiercely independent mountain people who marauded and created havoc in neighboring districts under Macedonian and Roman occupations.

== History ==
=== Early ===
The permanent nucleus of Isauria was north of the Taurus range which lies directly south of Iconium and Lystra. Lycaonia had all the Iconian plain; but Isauria began as soon as the foothills were reached. Its two original towns, Isaura Nea and Isaura Palaea, lay, one among these foothills (Doria) and the other on the watershed (Zengibar Kalesi), located at approximately 37°29′N 32°12′E near Bozkir.

In the 4th century BC, Isauria was the wild district about Isaura Palaea and the heads of the Calycadnus. When the capital, Isaura (also known as Isaura Vetus or Isaura Palaea), a strongly fortified city at the foot of Mt. Taurus, was besieged by Perdiccas, the Macedonian regent after Alexander the Great's death, the Isaurians set the place alight and let it perish in flames rather than submit to capture.

=== Roman rule ===
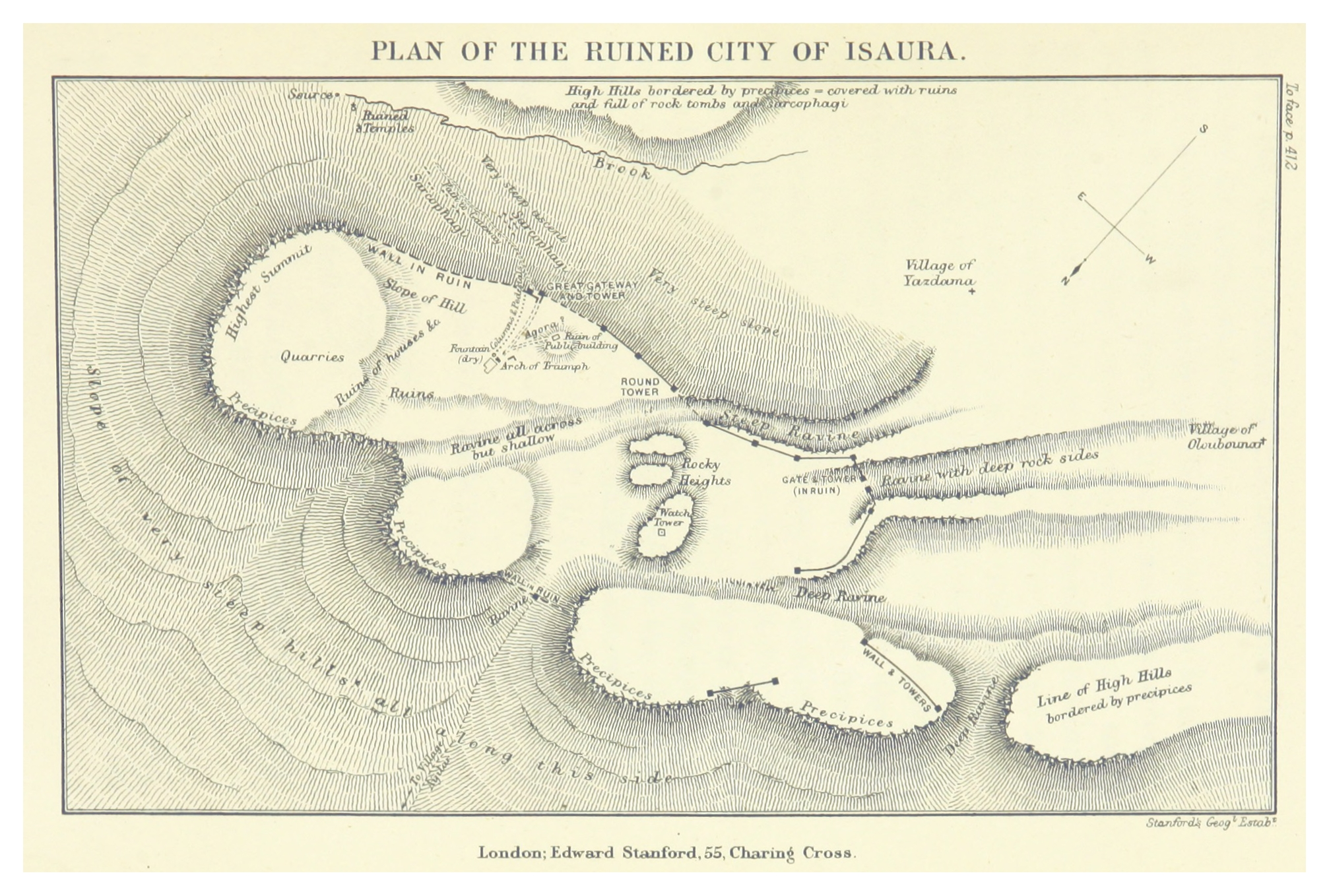
Plan of the ruins of Isaura (Davis, 1879)

When the Romans first encountered the Isaurians (early in the 1st century BC), they regarded Cilicia Trachea as part of Isauria, which thus extended to the Mediterranean Sea; and this extension of the name continued to be in common use for two centuries. The whole basin of the Calycadnus was reckoned Isaurian, and the cities in the valley of its southern branch formed what was known as the Isaurian Decapolis.

The Isaurians were brought partially under control (76–75 BC) by the Romans. During the war of the Cilician and other pirates against Rome, the Isaurians took so active a part that the proconsul P. Servilius deemed it necessary to follow them into their rugged strongholds, and compel the whole people to submission, an exploit for which he received the title of Isauricus (75 BC).

In the year AD 6, Cassius Dio mentions that the Isaurians were marauding through the province of Asia until they were faced with open war and were defeated.

The Isaurians were afterwards placed for a time under the rule of Amyntas, king of Galatia; but it is evident that they continued to retain their predatory habits and virtual independence. In the 3rd century they sheltered the rebel emperor Trebellianus.

In the early 4th century, all Cilicia was detached by order of Diocletian for administrative purposes from the northern slope of Taurus. A province called at first Isauria-Lycaonia, and later Isauria alone, extended up to the limits of Galatia, but not past Taurus on the south. Pisidia, part of which had hitherto been included in one province with Isauria, was also detached, and made to include Iconium; Isauria received the eastern part of Pamphylia. The coastal Metropolis of Seleucia was designated as Isauria's provincial capital.

In the 4th century they were still described by Ammianus Marcellinus as the scourge of the neighbouring provinces of Asia Minor, with a major series of raids occurring from AD 404 to 409, including one campaign to eradicate them led by the Eastern Roman general Arbazacius, but they were said to have been effectually subdued in the reign of Justinian I.

Some Byzantine emperors were of Isaurian descent: Zeno, whose native name was Tarasicodissa Rousoumbladadiotes; his son, Leo II; and perhaps Leontius, who reigned from 695 to 698. (Note: While Leo III is nicknamed "the Isaurian" and his dynasty is often called the Isaurian dynasty, the emperor was actually of Syriac origin, with his original name being Conon (or Cononus).) The empire used Isaurians as soldiers, generals and at one point they even formed part of the emperor's personal guard, the Excubitores. However, the population of Constantinople considered the Isaurians as barbarians, and emperor Anastasius I had to fight a long war against Isaurian rebels (Isaurian War, 492–497).

=== Later ===
The ruins of Isaura Palaea are mainly remarkable for their fine situation, fortifications and tombs. Those of Isaura Nea have disappeared, but numerous inscriptions and many sculpture stelae, built into the houses of Dorla, prove the site. It was the latter, and not the former town, that Servilius reduced by cutting off the water supply. J. R. S. Sterrett explored in the highland of Isauria in 1885 but it was not exhaustive. The site was identified by W. M. Ramsay in 1901.

Ramsay discovered there more than fifty Greek inscriptions, the greater number Christian, as well as magnificent tombs. These monuments date from the third, fourth, and fifth centuries.

== Ecclesiastical history ==
It is argued that Paul evangelised in Claudiopolis, the only Roman colony in the region by that time.

The Isaurian church was originally under the authority of the Patriarch of Antioch, but was attached to the Patriarch of Constantinople in the late 7th or early 8th century.

Because Aetius (fl 451) is called in inscriptions bishop of Isauropolis and Isaura Palaea, and as no Notitia episcopatuum makes mention of Isaura, or Isauropolis, Ramsay supposes that the Diocese of Isaura Nova was early joined with that of Leontopolis, the more recent name of Isaura Palaea, mentioned in all the "Notitiae".

== Comparative perspectives ==
The Isaurians' warlike reputation was harnessed to the service of the Eastern Roman empire as large numbers of them were recruited to fill up the ranks of its military. As stated by historian Gang Hao Poh, the story of the Isaurians bears much resemblance to the Taishan coalition of Zang Ba in the late Eastern Han period in China. In the case of both groups, their identities were inseparable from their martial abilities and the desire by imperial factions to exploit their skills and numbers in the age of civil wars. As with the so-called bandit coalitions of the Three Kingdoms, the Isaurians and their mountain strongholds reveal that the politicization of regions was directly related to mountains as lasting hideouts of resistance and civilization. Carving up large swaths of territories within the empires, these mountain lords and rebels could exert their independence due to the inability of empires to completely subjugate the wilderness. The mountains were a significant component of these areas falling outside of direct imperial control.

== See also ==
- Ancient regions of Anatolia
- Olba (ancient city) – Hellenistic period city in Isauria.
