= 370s =

Decade

The 370s decade ran from January 1, 370, to December 31, 379.

== Events ==
=== By place ===
==== Roman Empire ====
- Germanic Invasions: Various Germanic tribes are forced against the northern borders of the Roman Empire as they flee the invading Huns.
- A law of Valentinian I and Valens bans marriages between Romans and barbarians under penalty of death.
- An edict issued by Valentinian I and Valens bans the importation of wine and olive oil from areas controlled by the barbarians.

==== Europe ====
- The Huns migrate westward from the Volga into Europe and subjugate the Alans and the Ostrogoths. With their arrival, a tradition of composite bows is introduced.
- Athanaric, Gothic leader of the Tervingi, advances eastwards and takes up a defensive position along the banks of the Dniester (Romania).

==== Asia ====
- Former Qin conquers Former Yan in China.

=== By topic ===
==== Religion ====
- Basil the Great becomes bishop of Caesarea (Cappadocia).
- Demophilus of Constantinople becomes Patriarch of Constantinople, although his position is disputed by Evagrius of Constantinople.
- John Chrysostom is baptized.

=== By place ===
==== Roman Empire ====
- The fortified cities of the Danube, with Sirmium (Pannonia) at the forefront, contribute to stop an invasion of the Quadi.

==== Persia ====
- The Persian Empire attains the zenith of its power under King Shapur II as the Romans renew their war against Persia. Hostilities will continue for the next 5 years.

==== Asia ====
- Baekje forces sack the city of P'yongyang in Goguryeo.
- Sosurim becomes king of Goguryeo.

=== By topic ===
==== Art and Science ====
- Roman poet Ausonius writes of a voyage on the Rhine and the Moselle in his work 'Mosella'.

==== Religion ====
- Augustine of Hippo, age 17, travels to Carthage to continue his education in rhetoric.
- Martin of Tours becomes bishop of Tours (approximate date).

=== By place ===
==== Roman Empire ====
- Emperor Valentinian I is engaged in operations against the Alamanni, Quadi and Sarmatians, while his subordinates are dealing with the Roman usurper Firmus in Africa and the Picts in Britain.

==== Europe ====
- The Huns attack the Tervingi on the Dniester, overwhelming them with light cavalry (horse archers), and devastating the settlements of the Goths. King Athanaric is defeated and seeks refuge in Caucaland in the Carpathian Mountains.
- Athanaric starts building new defensive works to protect his people against the Alans and the Huns.

==== China ====
- Sixteen Kingdoms: Jin Feidi is dethroned as emperor of the Eastern Jin Dynasty. He is replaced by his granduncle Sima Yu, who is installed as Jin Jianwendi.
- September 12 – Jin Xiaowudi, age 10, succeeds his father Jin Jianwendi. Empress Chu Suanzi serves as regent, but decisions are made by the high officials Xie An and Wang Tanzhi.
- The first diplomatic ties are established between the Korean kingdom of Baekje and the Chinese court of the Jin Dynasty.

=== By topic ===
==== Art and Science ====
- The national academy of Chinese learning, called Taehak, is established in the kingdom of Goguryeo (Korea).
- Basil the Great establishes the Basileias, possibly the first hospital, near Caesarea Mazaca on land granted by emperor Valens.

==== Religion ====
- Gregory of Nyssa becomes bishop of Nyssa.
- Buddhism is adopted as the official religion of Gorguryeo.
- Saint Augustine adopts Manichaeism.
- Valentinian I bans Manichaean meetings.

=== By place ===
==== Roman Empire ====
- Emperor Valens is converted to Arianism, and orders the persecution of Trinitarian Christians in the Roman East.
- Quintus Aurelius Symmachus becomes proconsul of Africa, and is made a member of the pontifical college.
- Count Theodosius the Elder is appointed commander of an expedition to suppress the rebellion of Firmus in Mauretania.
- The Aqueduct of Valens is inaugurated near Constantinople (modern Istanbul); the aqueduct has a length of 971 meters.

==== Europe ====
- Battle of the Tanais River: The Huns defeat the Alans near the Don, sending the remnants fleeing westward.

==== Persia ====
- King Shapur II declares war as a result of Valens' support of Armenia. Emperor Valens makes Antioch his military base for the campaign against Persia.

=== By topic ===
==== Religion ====
- Saint Martin of Tours undertakes the Christianization of Gaul.

=== By place ===
==== Roman Empire ====
- The Quadi cross the Danube and begin ravaging Pannonia. They avoid the fortified cities and plunder the unprotected countryside.

==== Mesoamerica ====
- May 4 – Spearthrower Owl ascends to the throne and becomes ruler of Teotihuacan (Mexico).

=== By topic ===
==== Religion ====
- December 7 – The people of Milan astonish Ambrosius, governor of Aemilia-Liguria, by acclaiming him bishop. He is the second son of the former praetorian prefect of Gaul, and becomes a creative thinker whose ideas will provide the paradigm for medieval church-state relations.

=== By place ===
==== Roman Empire ====
- November 17 – Emperor Valentinian I concludes an enduring peace with the Alamanni in Germany, then marches into Illyricum to repel an invasion of the Quadi and the Sarmatians on the Danube frontier. While negotiating with the Quadi, Valentinian, age 54, becomes so enraged that he dies in a fit of apoplexy at Brigetio (Hungary). Extreme cruelty has marked his 11-year reign, but he has also founded schools and provided physicians to serve the poor of Constantinople.
- The Quadi accept an uneasy peace from Merobaudes (Magister militum), which gives them land to settle on the Danube.
- Gratian, age 16, takes over the government at Augusta Treverorum (modern Trier), but ministers wishing to retain the loyalty of the Illyrian army fear a usurper. They proclaim Valentinian's 4-year-old son Valentinian II co-emperor with his mother, Justina, as regent. Gratian reserves for himself the administration of the Gallic provinces, and hands over Italy, Illyrium, Hispania and Africa to his stepmother, who makes Mediolanum (Milan) her residence.
- Gratian, advised by his chief advisor Ambrosius, begins a systematic persecution of the pagans. He confiscates the fortunes of the temples and adds the money to the Imperial Treasury. He proscribes Arianism and Donatism.
- In Africa, the dissident Berber prince Firmus is delivered to the Romans by his brother Gildon.

==== India ====
- Emperor Chandragupta II becomes ruler of the Gupta Empire (India). He is the son of Samudragupta the Great and retains his reign by an aggressive expansionist policy.

==== Asia ====
- Geungusu becomes king of the Korean kingdom of Baekje.

=== By topic ===
==== Education ====
- The earliest extant books – a school textbook and an account book – with bound wooden leaves, are lost at the Dakhla Oasis in western Egypt. The desert sands preserve them for modern archaeologists.

==== Religion ====
- The first two Korean Buddhist temples are built.
- Saint Jerome retires to the desert of Chalcis (Syria).
- The Maronite Church is founded by Saint Maron in Lebanon.
- The Talmud of Babylon is written by Rav Ashi. This commentary on the Mishnah contains approximately 2.5 million words on 5.894 pages.

=== By place ===
==== Roman Empire ====
- Gothic War: Emperor Valens permits the Visigothic chieftain Fritigern and his people to cross the Danube from Thrace (later Romania), and settle on Roman soil in Lower Moesia, on the condition that they provide soldiers to the legions. The Visigoths embark by troops on boats and rafts, and canoes made from hollowed tree trunks. The river is swollen by frequent rains; a large number try to swim and are drowned in their struggle against the force of the stream.
- The Greuthungi, led by Alatheus and Saphrax, displaced by the predations of the Huns and Alans, request asylum within the Roman Empire. They are refused. The Roman frontier forces stretched to the breaking point, they slip across the Danube and unite with Fritigern. With their situation critical and desperately short of food, discontent is rising amongst the Goths.
- The Romans fail to disarm the Visigoths, bungle administration of the refugees, and mistreat them, taking some of their children as slaves. The Goths break out of their containment area along the Danube and strike south towards the low-lying fertile region near Marcianople (Bulgaria). Although defying the local Roman officials, they are not in open revolt.
- Lupicinus, count (Comes) of Thrace, tries to bring the Visigoths back under control. He invites Fritigern and the Gothic leaders to a banquet, letting them believe that in addition to food and drink, they can discuss provisions for their people. During the feast, Lupicinus tries to assassinate the Gothic delegation. Fritigern escapes and the Goths begin looting and burning the farms and Roman villas near Marcianople.
- Lupicinus attacks the Visigoths 9 miles outside Marcianople with hastily gathered local troops. His force (5,000 men) is annihilated and the Goths equip themselves with Roman armour and weapons. Fritigern marches south towards Adrianople (Turkey).
- Fearing they will join Fritigern, Roman troops of Gothic origin stationed in Adrianople are ordered by Valens to move east. The soldiers request a two-day delay to prepare and ask for food and money for the journey. However, the chief magistrate of Adrianople refuses and the Goths break out in open rebellion. They inflict heavy casualties among the citizens. Arming themselves with Roman equipment, they join forces with Fritigern.
- Winter – Fritigern attempts an unsuccessful siege of Adrianople. His troops try to storm the city walls, but abandon the attacks and break into small bands, better able to forage and feed themselves. Roman prisoners switch sides and give the Goths a valuable source of local intelligence.

==== China ====
- Zhang Tianxi, ruler of Former Liang, submits to Fu Jiān of Former Qin, thus ending the state of Former Liang. Zhang is made "Marquess of Guiyi".
- China is divided between the Former Qin in the north and the Eastern Jin in the south.

=== By place ===
==== Roman Empire ====
- Gothic War: Famine in Lower Moesia (occupied by the Goths) takes a fearsome toll. Fritigern and his followers appeal for help, but the governors Lupicinus and Maximus regard them as second-class citizens. Little help is forthcoming, and thousands starve to death. The pressure on the Roman frontier is still severe, with the Taifali and other hostile bands of Goths on the Danube. In addition, groups of Huns and Alans have also moved up to the river.
- Emperor Valens requests his nephew Gratian to send Roman troops against the Goths. He responds by sending the ageing General Frigeridus with elite reinforcements that Ammianus calls ‘Pannonian and Transalpine auxiliaries (Pannonicis et Transalpinis auxiliis).’ Gratian also sends Richomeres, his Frankish commander of household troops (comes domesticorum), at the head of a number of troops drawn from the Gallic field army.
- Battle of the Willows: The Romans abandon the guerrilla strategy and are attacked by the Goths. The battle is indecisive but both sides suffer heavy casualties. The only Roman army available to face the Goths is no longer a fighting force. Richomeres withdraws his troops south of Marcianople (Bulgaria).
- Valens sends Saturninus to the Balkan Mountains to block the passes. These efforts are possibly supported by units of limitanei (light infantry) withdrawn from areas under Goth control. Split into small bands and unable to join the Tervingi in sufficient strength to overcome the Roman cordon, the Goths grow increasingly desperate.
- The Goths (possibly Greuthungi) make an alliance with some of the Huns and Alans along the Danube, and entice them across the river. With the balance of power now shifted Saturninus concentrates his forces to avoid his outposts being overrun. This opens the passes, allowing the Goths, Huns and Alans to break out into the lowlands of southern Thrace.
- Autumn – Bands of predatory "barbarians" spread throughout the province in search of food, supplies and booty. Most Roman troops are bottled up in the towns. Some elite units remain in the field and skirmish with the Goths. One such action takes place outside the town of Dibaltum. The Scutarii heavy cavalry is destroyed in a mad charge against the Goths.
- The Goths, now seeking a military victory to force the Empire to make terms, aim to dislodge the army of Frigeridus from Beroea. He withdraws over the Succi (Ihtiman) Pass back to Illyrium, and reports to Gratian that an expedition by the main imperial armies is required to repulse the Goths in Thrace.
- Valens concludes a peace with the Persian Empire and leaves enough troops to defend the eastern frontier. The Saracens under Queen Mavia revolt and devastate a swath of territory stretching from Phoenicia and Palestine as far as the Sinai (Egypt). Valens successfully brings the uprising under control.

==== Persia ====
- Persian king Shapur II pushes the Huns back across the Caucasus.

=== By topic ===
==== Art and Science ====
- Chinese painter Gu Kaizhi paints his work, "The Nymph of the Luo River".

=== By place ===
==== Roman Empire ====
- Spring – Emperor Valens returns to Constantinople and mobilises an army (40,000 men). He appoints Sebastianus, newly arrived from Italy, as magister militum to reorganize the Roman armies in Thrace.
- February – The Lentienses (part of the Alemanni) cross the frozen Rhine and raid the countryside. They are driven back by Roman auxilia palatina (Celtae and Petulantes), who defend the western frontier.
- May – Battle of Argentovaria: Emperor Gratian is forced to recall the army he has sent East. The Lentienses are defeated by Mallobaudes near Colmar (France). Gratian gains the title Alemannicus Maximus.
- Gothic War: Valens sends Sebastian with a body of picked troops (2,000 men) to Thrace and renews the guerrilla war against the Goths. He chases down small groups of Gothic raiders around Adrianople.
- Fritigern concentrates his army at Cabyle (Bulgaria). The Goths are mainly centred in the river valleys south of the Balkan Mountains, around the towns of Beroea, Cabyle and Dibaltum.
- July – Frigeridus, Roman general, fortifies the Succi (Ihtiman) Pass to prevent the "barbarians" from breaking out to the north-west (Pannonia).
- Gratian sets out from Lauriacum (Austria) with a body of light armed troops. His force is small enough to travel by boat down the Danube. He halts for four days at Sirmium (Serbia) suffering from fever.
- August – Gratian continues down the Danube to the "Camp of Mars" (frontier fortress near modern Niš), where he loses several men in an ambush by a band of Alans.
- Fritigern strikes south from Cabyle, following the Tundzha River towards Adrianople, and tries to get behind the supply lines to Constantinople.
- Roman reconnaissance detects the Goths. Valens, already west of Adrianople, turns back and establishes a fortified camp outside the city.
- The Goths, with their wagons and families vulnerable to attack, withdraw back to the north. Roman scouts fail to detect the Greuthungi cavalry foraging further up the Tundzha valley.
- Fritigern sends a Christian priest to the Roman camp with an offer of terms and a letter for Valens. The peace overtures are rejected.
- August 9 – Battle of Adrianople: Valens leads an elite Roman army to Thrace to confront revolts, but is defeated.
- The Goths attack Adrianople; they attempt to scale the city walls with ladders but are repelled by the defenders, who drop lumps of masonry.
- The Goths, supported by the Huns, move on to Constantinople. Their progress is checked by the Saracens, recruited from Arab tribes who control the eastern fringes of the empire.
- October – The Greuthungi, faced with food shortages, split off and move west into Pannonia. Followed by their families, they raid villages and farmland.

==== Mesoamerica ====
- Siyaj K'ak' begins to replace Mayan kings with relatives of Spearthrower Owl, emperor of Teotihuacan.
- Siyaj K'ak' conquers Waka on January 8.
- Siyaj K'ak' conquers Tikal on January 16.
- Siyaj K'ak' conquers Uaxactun.

=== By topic ===
==== Architecture ====
- Valens completes the aqueduct of Constantinople begun by Constantine I.

==== Religion ====
- Gregory of Nazianzus is ordained bishop of Constantinople.
- Pope Damasus I is accused of adultery but is exonerated by Gratian.

=== By place ===
==== Roman Empire ====
- January 19 – Emperor Gratian elevates Flavius Theodosius at Sirmium, giving him the title Augustus with power over all the eastern provinces. Theodosius comes to terms with the Visigoths and settles them in the Balkans as military allies (foederati).
- Gratian refuses the title of Eastern Emperor.
- Gratian renounces the title Pontifex Maximus.
- Britain is forced to endure fierce Barbarian raids.

==== Europe ====
- Niall becomes High King of Ireland.

==== Persia ====
- King Shapur II, ruler of the Persian Empire, age 70, dies after a 69-year reign in which he conquered Armenia and transferred multitudes of people from the western lands to Susiana (Khuzistan). The great town Nishapur in Khorasan (eastern Parthia) is also founded by him. His brother Ardashir II, governor-king of Adiabene, is placed by the nobles on the throne.

==== China ====
- Former Qin captures the city of Xiangyang from Eastern Jin. The Buddhist monk Dao'an is transferred from Xiangyang to Chang'an.

==== Mesoamerica ====
- September 13 – Yax Nuun Ayiin (I) becomes ruler of Tikal.

=== By topic ===
==== Religion ====
- Gregory Nazianzus becomes Patriarch of Constantinople, and is wounded when he is attacked by a mob of heretics.
- John Chrysostom writes a book on the Christian education of children.

== Births ==
370

- Alaric I (or Alaricus), king of the Visigoths (d. 410)
- Brice of Tours, Catholic bishop of Tours (d. 444)
- Claudian, Roman poet and writer (d. 404)
- Decimus Rusticus, Roman praetorian prefect
- Hypatia, Greek female philosopher (d. 415)

371

- Dao Wu Di, Chinese emperor of Northern Wei (d. 409)
- Sengrui, Chinese Buddhist monk and scholar (d. 438)
- Valentinian II, Roman consul and emperor (d. 392)

372

- Pei Songzhi, Chinese historian and politician (d. 451)

373

- Murong Hui, Chinese general and prince of the Later Yan Dynasty (d. 397)
- Murong Sheng (or Daoyun), Chinese emperor of the Later Yan Dynasty (d. 401)
- Synesius of Cyrene, Christian bishop (approximate date)

374

- Fu Liang (or Jiyou), Chinese official and politician (d. 426)
- Gwanggaeto the Great, Korean king of Goguryeo (d. 412)

375

- Orosius, Christian historian and theologian (approximate date)
- Zong Bing (or Shaowen), Chinese artist and musician (d. 443)

376

- Cyril of Alexandria, Egyptian patriarch (d. 444)

377

- Arcadius, Roman consul and emperor (approximate date)
- Euthymius the Great, Armenian abbot and bishop (d. 473)
- Valerian of Abbenza, Christian bishop and saint (d. 457)

378

- Germanus of Auxerre, Christian bishop (approximate date)

379

- Gunderic, king of the Vandals and Alans (d. 428)
- Wang Hong, Chinese politician and general (d. 432)

== Deaths ==
370

- Deng Xia (or Yingyuan), Chinese general (approximate date)
- Eudoxius of Antioch, Syrian patriarch of Constantinople
- Lucifer Calaritanus, founder of the Luciferian sect (approximate date)
- Pharantzem, Armenian queen and regent (approximate date)
- Strategius Musonianus, Roman politician (approximate date)
- Valentinianus Galates, Roman emperor (approximate date)
- Yuan Zhen (or Yanren), Chinese general and rebel leader

371

- April 12 – Zeno of Verona, Christian bishop and martyr
- August 1 – Eusebius of Vercelli, Christian bishop (b. 283)
- Gogugwon, king of Goguryeo (Korea)
- Hilarion, Syrian anchorite and saint (b. 291)
- Lucifer Calaritanus, Christian bishop (approximate date)

372

- Jianwen of Jin, Chinese emperor of the Jin Dynasty (b. 320)
- Maximus of Ephesus, Greek Neoplatonist philosopher
- Sabbas the Goth, Christian reader and saint (b. 334)

373

- May 2 – Athanasius of Alexandria, Egyptian bishop and saint (b. 296)
- June 9 – Ephrem the Syrian, Syrian Orthodox priest and saint (b. 306)
- Huan Wen (or Yuanzi), Chinese general and regent (b. 312)
- Nerses I (the Great), Armenian catholicos (or patriarch)
- Sun Sheng, Chinese historian and politician (b. 302)

374

- January 2 – Gregory the Elder, Christian bishop and saint (b. 276)
- April 20 – Marcellinus of Gaul (or Marcellin), Christian bishop
- November 17 – Pap of Armenia (or Papas), king of Armenia
- Auxentius of Milan, Christian bishop and theologian
- Marcellus of Ancyra, Christian bishop and saint
- Pushyavarman, Indian ruler of Kamarupa

375

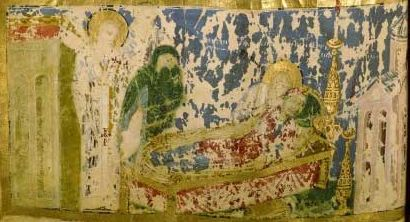
Saint Gorgonia

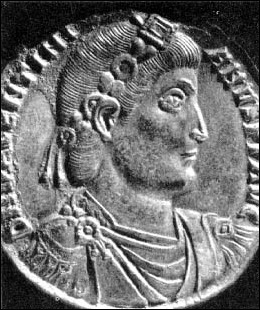
Emperor Valentinian I

- February 23 – Saint Gorgonia, daughter of Gregory the Elder
- May 30 – Emmelia of Caesarea, Byzantine Eastern Orthodox priest
- September 3 – Mansuetus, Christian bishop and saint
- November 17 – Valentinian I, Roman emperor (b. 321)
- Geunchogo (or Chogo II), Korean ruler of Baekje
- Kipunada, Indian ruler of the Kushan Empire
- Pambo (or Pemwah), Coptic Desert Father (b. 305)
- Rav Papa, Babylonian Jewish amora and talmudist
- Samudragupta, Indian emperor of the Gupta Empire
- Wang Meng (or Jinglüe), Chinese politician (b. 325)

376

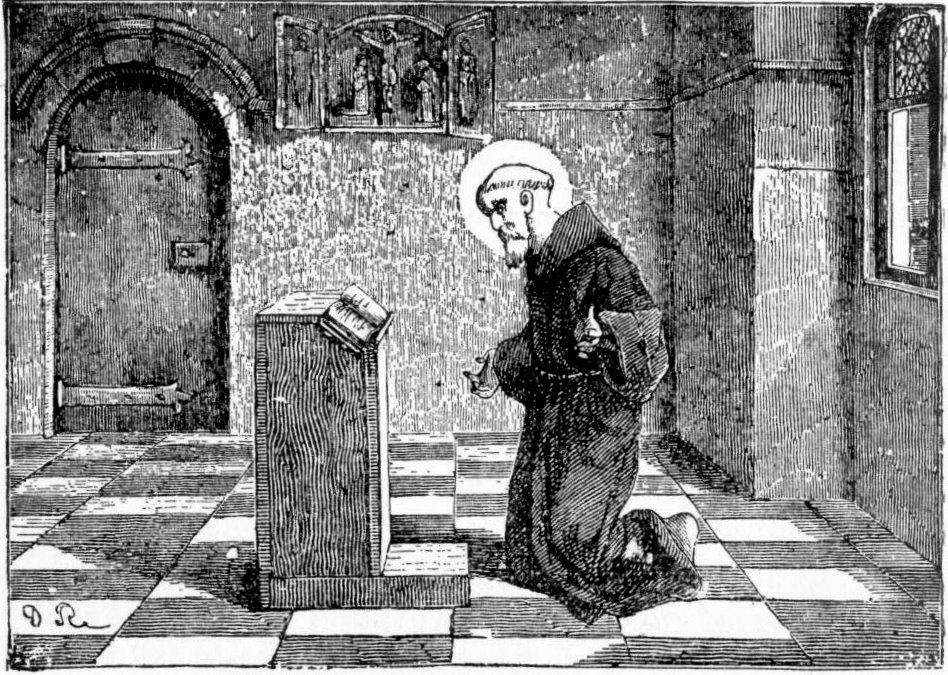
Saint Bademus

- April 10 – Bademus, Christian abbot and saint
- October 10 – Acepsimas of Hnaita, Persian bishop
- Ermanaric, king of the Goths (Greuthungi) (b. 291)
- Theodosius the Elder, Roman general
- Tuoba Shiyiqian, prince of the Tuoba Dai (b. 320)
- Yuan Hong, Chinese historian and politician (b. 328)

377

- Chi Chao (or Jingyu), Chinese adviser and politician (b. 336)
- Huan Huo (or Langzi), Chinese general (b. 320)
- Julian Sabas (the Ascetic), Byzantine hermit
- Sahak I, Armenian archbishop and catholicos

378

- August 9
  - Sebastianus, Roman general (magister peditum)
  - Traianus, Roman general (magister militum)
  - Valens, Roman consul and emperor (b. 328)
- Flavius Arintheus, Roman politician and general
- Titus of Bostra, Christian bishop and theologian

379

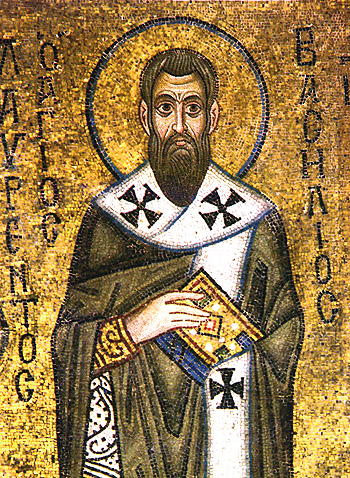
Saint Basil the Great

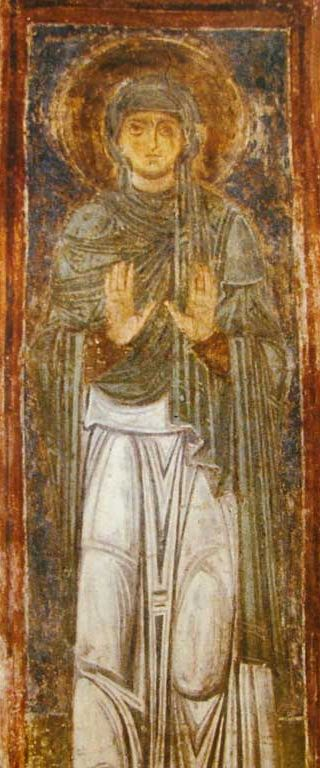
Saint Macrina the Younger

- January 1 – Basil the Great, bishop of Caesarea Mazaca (b. 330)
- July 19 – Macrina the Younger, Christian nun and saint (b. 327)
- Shapur II (the Great), ruler of the Sasanian Empire (b. 309)
