= 377 =

377 in various calendars
- Gregorian calendar: 377; CCCLXXVII
- Ab urbe condita: 1130
- Assyrian calendar: 5127
- Balinese saka calendar: 298–299
- Bengali calendar: −217 – −216
- Berber calendar: 1327
- Buddhist calendar: 921
- Burmese calendar: −261
- Byzantine calendar: 5885–5886
- Chinese calendar: 丙子年 (Fire Rat); 3074 or 2867 — to — 丁丑年 (Fire Ox); 3075 or 2868
- Coptic calendar: 93–94
- Discordian calendar: 1543
- Ethiopian calendar: 369–370
- Hebrew calendar: 4137–4138
- Hindu calendars
- Vikram Samvat: 433–434
- Shaka Samvat: 298–299
- Kali Yuga: 3477–3478
- Holocene calendar: 10377
- Iranian calendar: 245 BP – 244 BP
- Islamic calendar: 253 BH – 252 BH
- Javanese calendar: 259–260
- Julian calendar: 377; CCCLXXVII
- Korean calendar: 2710
- Minguo calendar: 1535 before ROC 民前1535年
- Nanakshahi calendar: −1091
- Seleucid era: 688/689 AG
- Thai solar calendar: 919–920
- Tibetan calendar: མེ་ཕོ་བྱི་བ་ལོ་ (male Fire-Rat); 503 or 122 or −650 — to — མེ་མོ་གླང་ལོ་ (female Fire-Ox); 504 or 123 or −649

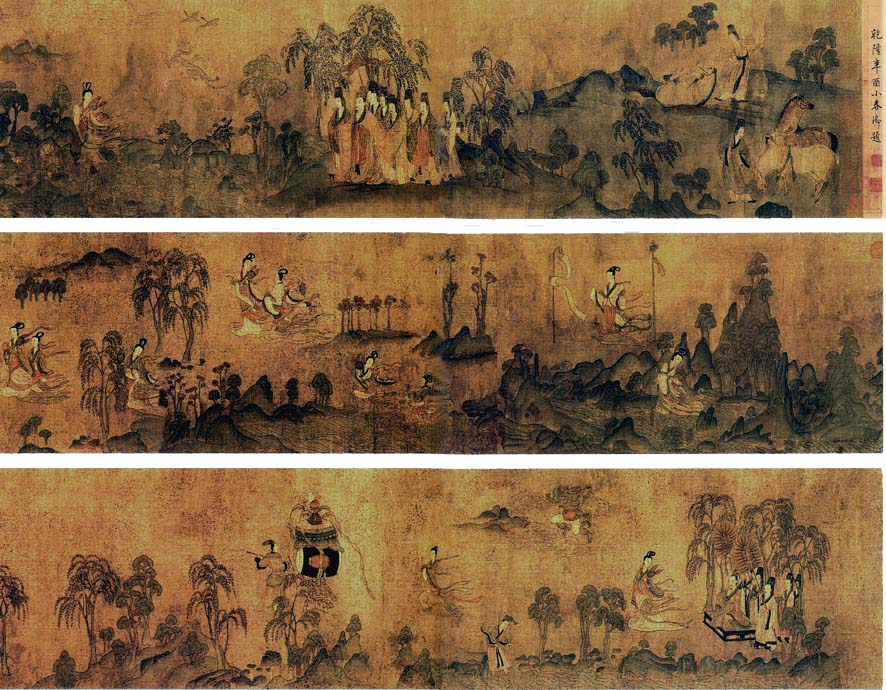
The Nymph of the Luo River by Gu Kaizhi

Year 377 (CCCLXXVII) was a common year starting on Sunday of the Julian calendar. At the time, it was known as the Year of the Consulship of Augustus and Merobaudes (or, less frequently, year 1130 Ab urbe condita). The denomination 377 for this year has been used since the early medieval period, when the Anno Domini calendar era became the prevalent method in Europe for naming years.

== Events ==
=== By place ===
==== Roman Empire ====
- Gothic War: Famine in Lower Moesia (occupied by the Goths) takes a fearsome toll. Fritigern and his followers appeal for help, but the governors Lupicinus and Maximus regard them as second-class citizens. Little help is forthcoming, and thousands starve to death. The pressure on the Roman frontier is still severe, with the Taifali and other hostile bands of Goths on the Danube. In addition, groups of Huns and Alans have also moved up to the river.
- Emperor Valens requests his nephew Gratian to send Roman troops against the Goths. He responds by sending the ageing General Frigeridus with elite reinforcements that Ammianus calls ‘Pannonian and Transalpine auxiliaries (Pannonicis et Transalpinis auxiliis).’ Gratian also sends Richomeres, his Frankish commander of household troops (comes domesticorum), at the head of a number of troops drawn from the Gallic field army.
- Battle of the Willows: The Romans abandon the guerrilla strategy and are attacked by the Goths. The battle is indecisive but both sides suffer heavy casualties. The only Roman army available to face the Goths is no longer a fighting force. Richomeres withdraws his troops south of Marcianople (Bulgaria).
- Valens sends Saturninus to the Balkan Mountains to block the passes. These efforts are possibly supported by units of limitanei (light infantry) withdrawn from areas under Goth control. Split into small bands and unable to join the Tervingi in sufficient strength to overcome the Roman cordon, the Goths grow increasingly desperate.
- The Goths (possibly Greuthungi) make an alliance with some of the Huns and Alans along the Danube, and entice them across the river. With the balance of power now shifted Saturninus concentrates his forces to avoid his outposts being overrun. This opens the passes, allowing the Goths, Huns and Alans to break out into the lowlands of southern Thrace.
- Autumn – Bands of predatory "barbarians" spread throughout the province in search of food, supplies and booty. Most Roman troops are bottled up in the towns. Some elite units remain in the field and skirmish with the Goths. One such action takes place outside the town of Dibaltum. The Scutarii heavy cavalry is destroyed in a mad charge against the Goths.
- The Goths, now seeking a military victory to force the Empire to make terms, aim to dislodge the army of Frigeridus from Beroea. He withdraws over the Succi (Ihtiman) Pass back to Illyrium, and reports to Gratian that an expedition by the main imperial armies is required to repulse the Goths in Thrace.
- Valens concludes a peace with the Persian Empire and leaves enough troops to defend the eastern frontier. The Saracens under Queen Mavia revolt and devastate a swath of territory stretching from Phoenicia and Palestine as far as the Sinai (Egypt). Valens successfully brings the uprising under control.

==== Persia ====
- Persian king Shapur II pushes the Huns back across the Caucasus.

=== By topic ===
==== Art and Science ====
- Chinese painter Gu Kaizhi paints his work, "The Nymph of the Luo River".

== Births ==
- Arcadius, Roman consul and emperor (approximate date)
- Euthymius the Great, Armenian abbot and bishop (d. 473)
- Valerian of Abbenza, Christian bishop and saint (d. 457)

== Deaths ==
- Chi Chao (or Jingyu), Chinese adviser and politician (b. 336)
- Huan Huo (or Langzi), Chinese general (b. 320)
- Julian Sabas (the Ascetic), Byzantine hermit
- Sahak I, Armenian archbishop and catholicos
