= Farnobius =

Farnobius (died AD 377) was a Gothic chief who was killed in a battle with the Roman army of Frigeridus while trying to cross the mountains from Thrace into Illyricum.

== Biography ==
Farnobius was the optimatus (or chieftain) of one of the Greuthungi tribes, who were pressing on the Danubian frontier during the 370s as a result of westward pressure by the Huns. In 376, with the outbreak of the Gothic War, Farnobius led his people across the Danube from Muntenia, and poured into Moesia Secunda, together with two other Greuthungi tribes, led by Alatheus and Saphrax. Soon however, Farnobius broke away from the coalition, and proceeded to operate independently from the rest of the Greuthungi.

Farnobius’ tribe were soon joined by a group of Taifals, and they proceeded to ravage lower Moesia. In 377, Farnobius attacked a Roman castra at Beroea which was defended by the magister militum, Frigeridus. Frigeridus was forced to retreat from Thrace to Illyricum, where he managed to obtain reinforcements. He then returned to Thrace, moving through the mountains, where he surprised the troops of Farnobius, who were attempting to cross the same mountains. In the battle that followed, Farnobius was killed, and his troops captured.

After Farnobius’ defeat and death, his forces were deported to Italia to supplement the population of the peninsula.

== See also ==
- Battle of the Willows
