= 457 (disambiguation) =

457 may refer to:

- The year AD 457 in the Western calendar
- The number 457
- The 457 plan, a retirement plan available to government and nonprofit employees in the United States similar to the 401(k)
- The 457 visa, the most commonly used program for employers to sponsor overseas workers to work in Australia on a temporary basis.
- The Smith & Wesson Model 457, a pistol.

== See also ==
- 457th (disambiguation)
