= Battle of Adrianople (disambiguation) =

The Battle of Adrianople (378 CE), in which Gothic rebels defeated the Eastern Roman Empire, was the main battle of the Gothic War (376–382).

Battle of Adrianople may also refer to:

- Battle of Adrianople (324), a battle in which Constantine the Great defeated Licinius in a Roman civil war
- Battle of Adrianople, between the Eastern Roman army and a federation of Gothic tribes.
- Siege of Adrianople (378), an unsuccessful siege by the Goths following the Battle of Adrianople
- Battle of Adrianople (718), a battle between an alliance of Bulgarians and Byzantines against the Umayyad Caliphate, during the Siege of Constantinople (717–718)
- Battle of Adrianople (813), a successful Bulgarian siege of the Byzantine city
- Battle of Adrianople (972), a battle between Byzantines and Kievan Rus' led by Sviatoslav I of Kiev
- Battle of Adrianople (1003), a battle between Bulgarians and Byzantines
- Battle of Adrianople (1094), part of the revolt of Constantine Diogenes (pretender) and his Cuman allies
- Battle of Adrianople (1205), part of the Fourth Crusade, in which the Bulgarians defeated the Crusaders
- Battle of Adrianople (1226), part of the revolt of Theodore Komnenos Doukas
- Battle of Adrianople (1254), in which the Byzantines defeated the Bulgarians
- Battle of Adrianople (1305), a battle between the Byzantines and the Catalan Company
- Battle of Adrianople (1355), a battle between the Byzantines and the Serbs led by Stefan Dušan
- Battle of Adrianople (1365), in which the Ottoman Empire took the city from the Byzantine Empire
- Battle of Adrianople (1829), in which the Russians seized the city from the Ottoman Empire
- Siege of Adrianople (1912–1913), in which the Serbs and Bulgarians took the city from the Ottomans in the First Balkan War
- Siege of Adrianople (1913)

== See also ==
- Adrianople
- Battle of Tzirallum, a 313 CE battle in which Licinius defeated Maximinus Daza in a Roman civil war
