= Siege of Adrianople (378) =

Roman victory over the Goths

- Part of the Gothic War of 376–382 and the Roman–Germanic Wars
Date	10 August 378
Location	Adrianople, Eastern Roman Empire (modern-day Edirne, Turkey)
Result	Roman victory

Belligerents
Eastern Roman Empire	Goths

Commanders and leaders
Theodosius the Great	Fritigern

The siege of Adrianople took place in 378 following the Gothic victory at the Battle of Adrianople. Gothic forces were unable to breach the city walls and retreated. It was followed by an unsuccessful Gothic attempt to breach the walls of Constantinople.
