= Traianus (magister peditum) =

Roman army officer (died 378)

Traianus (Greek: Τραϊανός; died 9 August 378 at Adrianople) was a Roman general under Emperor Valens, with whom he died in the Battle of Adrianople.

== Life ==
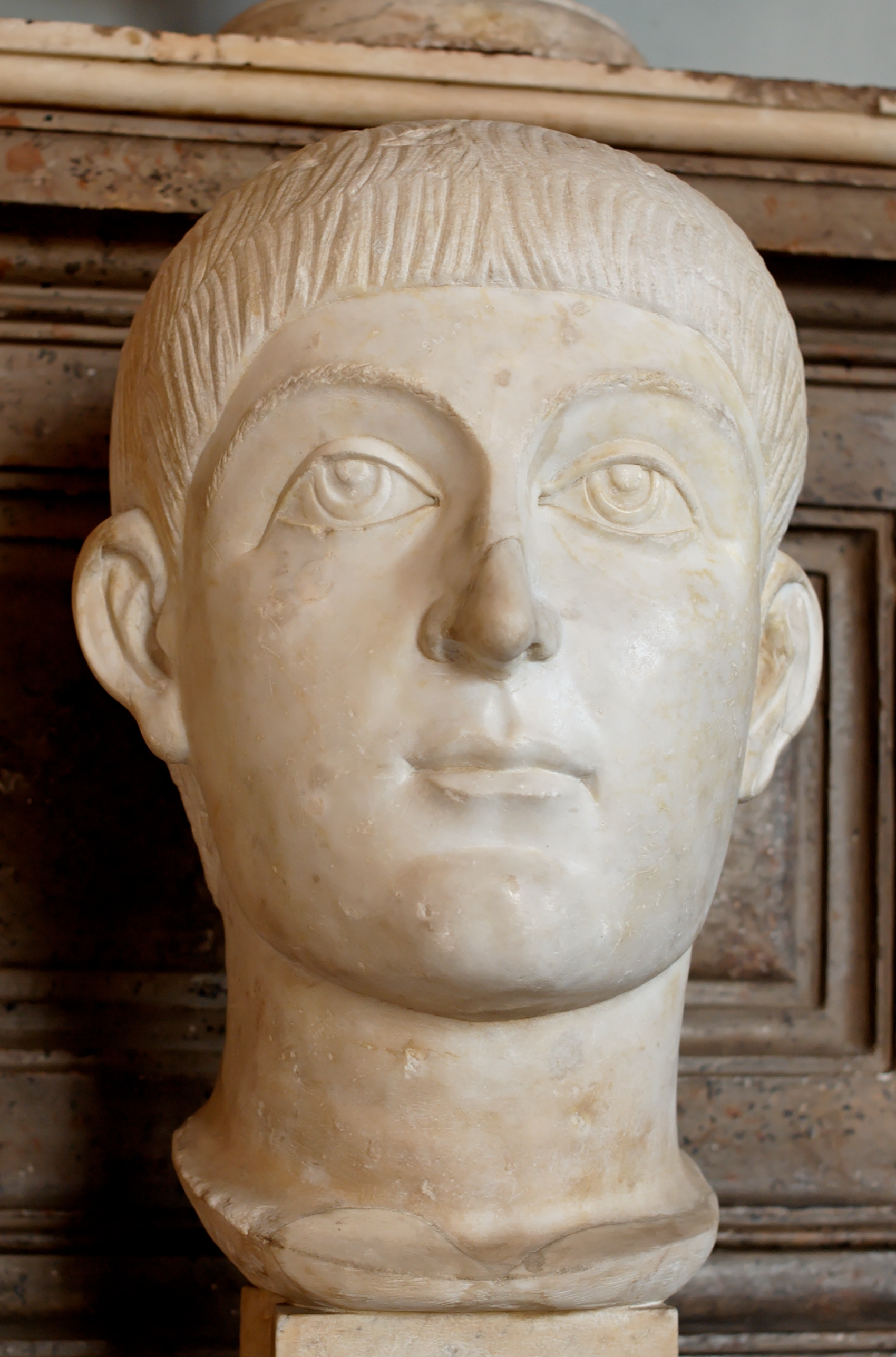
Roman Emperor Valens, under whom Traianus climbed the military hierarchy and with whom he died at the Battle of Adrianople (378).

Between 367 and 368 he held the military office of dux Aegypti. While in office, he and the praefectus augustalis Eutolmius Tatianus protected the Arian bishop Lucius of Alexandria. He was also ordered to rebuild the Caesareum and he started the building on May 1, 368.

Between 371 and 374 he was comes rei militaris in the East, where, together with the Alamannic king Vadomarius, he fought the Sasanids. At the end of the winter, the Sasanid king Shapur II gathered his army and moved against the Roman territory. Emperor Valens sent Vadomarius and Traianus against him, with a strong army and the order to keep the Sasanids under control but to avoid provoking them into battle. However, at Vagabanta the Sasanid cavalry forced the Roman infantry into contact: the infantry first tried to break contact, but then defeated the enemy. The following encounters had alternate results and so, at the end of summer, the generals signed a truce and retired. According to Ammianus Marcellinus, in 374, while commanding the Roman troops in Armenia, Traianus was secretly ordered by Valens to kill King Pap. Traianus obtained Pap's confidence and invited him to dinner: during the banquet, Traianus left the room and an assassin killed Pap. According to Nina Garsoïan, the murder of Pap may not have occurred at the Emperor's own initiative but rather as a result of a conspiracy by Traianus, Terentius, and other Orthodox officers in the East who were opposed to Valens's and Pap's pro-Arian religious policy.

Later he was promoted to the rank of magister peditum and was sent in Thracia to fight the Gothic War. In 376 the Goths had been allowed to enter Roman territory but, oppressed by Roman officers, had rebelled. Gathering under the leadership of Fritigern, the Goths marched towards Adrianople. Emperor Valens was at the time at Antioch, in Syria, where he was preparing the war against the Sasanids. The Emperor decided to send two of his generals, Profuturus and Traianus, to Thracia with fresh troops. The two generals decided to fight the bulk of the enemy army with their Armenian troops, which had proved valiant, and succeeded in pushing the Goths inside the valleys, where they hoped to defeat them by hunger. The Roman troops were, nonetheless, vastly inferior by number to the Goths, and, since the expected reinforcements led by Frigeridus did not arrive, the three generals Profuturus, Traianus, and Richomeres, agreed that Richomeres would be the chief commander. Here, at a site known as Ad Salices ("Near the Willows"), in Scythia Minor, the Romans and the Goths fought the Battle of the Willows: the Romans fought a huge number of Goths (Gothic soldiers with their families) who had entrenched behind a wall of wagons, then forced them to open-field battle. At first the Roman left wing broke, but thanks to the reinforcement of local troops, the Romans were able to sustain the fight until the night came, despite receiving huge losses.

When the news of the bloody battle arrived in the East, Valens sent the West more troops under the magister equitum Saturninus, who was to substitute the two generals. When he returned to Constantinople, Valens accused Traianus of cowardice, but thanks to the support of the magistri militum Arinthaeus and Victor, Traianus put the blame on Valens' persecution of the Nicenians.

In 378 Traianus was exonerated in favour of Sebastianus, but he was later recalled in service. Traianus followed Valens, who wanted to defeat the Goths before the arrival from the West of his nephew Gratian with the Western army. Valens fought the Goths in the battle of Adrianople (August 9, 378); here, after the Roman line was shattered and had fled, Traianus cried that the Emperor had been left alone by his guards. Hearing this Victor sought unsuccessfully to bring a reserve force of Batavi to the emperor's aid. Traianus and the emperor were among the many who fell on the battlefield.

== Family ==
Traianus had a daughter named Candida who was known for her piety, for which she earned a mention in the Lausiac History by Palladius of Galatia.

== Sources ==
- Garsoïan, Nina G. (1967). "Politique ou orthodoxie? L'Arménie au quatrième siècle". Revue des études arméniennes. Nouvelle série. IV: 297–320. ISSN 0080-2549.
- —— (1989). The Epic Histories Attributed to Pʻawstos Buzand (Buzandaran Patmutʻiwnkʻ). Cambridge, MA: Harvard University Press. ISBN 0-674-25865-7.
- Jones, Arnold Hugh Martin; Martindale, John Robert; Morris, John (1992). "Traianus 2". The Prosopography of the Later Roman Empire. Vol. 1. Cambridge University Press. pp. 921–922. ISBN 0-521-07233-6.
