= 457th =

457th may refer to:

- 457th Air Expeditionary Group, provisional United States Air Force unit assigned to the Air Combat Command
- 457th Airlift Squadron (457 AS), part of the 375th Airlift Wing at Andrews Air Force Base, Maryland
- 457th Fighter Squadron, United States Air Force Reserve Command (AFRC) unit, assigned to the 301st Operations Group

== See also ==
- 457 (number)
- 457 (disambiguation)
- 457, the year 457 (CDLVII) of the Julian calendar
- 457 BC
