= Treaty of 382 =

The treaty of 382 was the treaty (Latin: foedus) between the Roman Empire and the Goths that was concluded after the hostilities were ended on 3 October 382 This treaty made an end of the Gothic War (376-382) and Emperor Theodosius I was the architect of it. The text of the treaty itself has been lost, but can partly be reconstructed on the basis of knowledge from later sources and subsequent developments. Through this treaty, the Goths were assigned land within the Roman Empire and in return they were obliged to serve in the Roman army.

== Creation and meaning ==
The treaty of 382 is often considered as a turning point in the relationship between Rome and its barbaric neighbors. As a result of the agreement, the balance of power would shift drastically to the disadvantage of the empire and led to a policy change that ultimately contributed to the fall of the Western Roman Empire. A careful study of the sources points to a similarity that, although it showed traditional characteristics, at the same time it marked a changing reality of power for the empire.

Since the negotiations took place from early 381 to October 382, it was probably a difficult process of continuous communication by the Romans with various, scattered leaders of the Goths. It is unclear with which Gothic groups Theodosius specifically negotiated, because the most important leaders of the war are not mentioned. The agreement almost certainly covered the vast majority of the Tervingen, who were originally led by Fritigern. However, it is possible that groups Greuthungen also fell under it, and perhaps even groups of Huns and Alanen who had joined the Goths.

In the short term, the agreement of 382 was a political triumph for Theodosius. It enabled him to accomplish his task that had brought him to the throne. He made peace and brought back the Danube-Limes on strength to stop the barbarian peoples. Moreover, thanks to the help of his Gothic troops, he managed to end the Roman Civil War (387–388) by defeating his opponent Magnus Maximus and suppressing the usurpation of Flavius Eugenius in 394. However, in the longer term, the agreement turned out to be a great danger that started after Theodosius died in 395 with the rebellion of Alaric I.

== Treaty provisions ==
=== Settlement ===
The main provision of the treaty was that the Goths were allowed to settle within the Roman Empire. They were assigned farmland, probably in Thrace and in adjacent areas. The Roman statesman Themistius speaks in his speech that the Goths would soon share with the Romans in their tables, campaigns and public obligations. Other sources speak explicitly of their establishment as farmers.

=== Goths remain a community ===
The Goths were allowed to stay together as a community. This meant that they were not spread over Roman villages as individual farmers, but continued to exist as an organization under their own leaders. This part would later have far-reaching consequences and explains why a recognizable Gothic political and military community could still exist after 382. Exactly how this autonomy was legally laid down has not been handed down.

=== Military conscription ===
As the most important consideration for their establishment within the empire, the Goths were obliged to provide military services to Rome. They would fight for the emperor as Gothic contingents, probably largely under their own leaders. Themistius speaks of participation in the Roman wars and military campaigns. Later events confirm that Gothic troops were deployed in this way. In spite of, are the conditions under which this military service was fulfilled controversial. Jordanes claimed a hundred years later that 20,000 Gothic soldiers joined the Roman army as foederati under the leadership of their own tribal chiefs. The contemporary sources, on the other hand, write that Theodosius integrated these new recruits into the existing structure of the Roman army.

=== Recognition of imperial sovereignty ===
The Goths were obliged to recognize imperial sovereignty. Contemporary Roman sources do not present the arrangement as a treaty between two fully equal states They speak precisely about the submission (deditio) of the Goths. Themistius describes how Gothic leaders laid down their arms and submitted to the emperor.

=== Taxes and Roman civil law ===
The extent to which the Goths were subject to the Roman tax authorities and in return obtained Roman civil rights is also unclear. Themistius seems to suggest that the Goths would eventually participate in Roman taxes and public obligations, but from other sources it is not certain to deduce which tax scheme applied. We also do not know exactly how many Goths received Roman civil rights.

== Sources ==
Historians reconstruct the Treaty of 382 by juxtaposing different types of source and by looking at which information confirms each other. Main clues come from Themistius, whose speech is handed down from 383 (oratio 16), in which he praises the emperor for not destroying the Goths, but transformed them into allies and peasants. From this historians deduce that the Goths were allowed to stay in the empire, and that they were given land to work. The reason also suggests that they supplied soldiers, because Themistius emphasizes that they are now fighting for Rome instead of against it.

A second important source is Jordan (6th century). He writes that the Goths in Thrace were established as allies and served under their own leaders. Although Jordanes writes much later, he confirms the image that the Goths stayed as a collective group within the empire.

The critical interpretation of the Byzantine historian Zosimus (early 6th century) can be considered as a third source. He criticizes the policy of Theodosius. According to him, the barbarian groups were too much trusted and their influence within the army was too big, which weakened the Roman state. His criticism indirectly confirms that Gothic contingents were given a structural military role within the Roman army. Furthermore, there is military evidence from later events. After 382, Gothic troops are regularly mentioned as part of Roman armies, including at high-ranking military posts. Leaders such as Alaric I and Athaulf began their careers within the Roman military system. This suggests that the treaty did indeed contain a military obligation for Gothic warriors.

In addition, historians compare the Treaty of 382 to other treaties that the Romans concluded with barbarian groups of allies (foederati). Such treaties usually include: settlement on Roman territory, military service to the emperor, recognition of Roman sovereignty. Based on this, historians assume that the Treaty of 382 had a similar structure.

== Bibliography ==
- Heather, P. (2005). The Fall of the Roman Empire. ISBN 978-0-19-515954-7.
- Kulikowski, M. (2007). Rome's Gothic Wars. ISBN 978-0-521-8-4633-2.
- Hebblewhite, Mark (2020). Theodosius and the Limits of Empire. London: Routledge. doi:10.4324/9781315103334. ISBN 978-1-138-10298-9. S2CID 213344890.
- A.H.M. Jones; J. R. Martindale; J. Morris (1971), The Prosopography of the Later Roman Empire, Cambridge University Press
- Wolfram, Herwig (1988). History of the Goths. Berkeley: University of California Press. ISBN 978-0-52005-259-8.
