= Battle of Constantinople (378) =

378 battle in Gothic War

- Part of the Gothic War of 376–382 and the Roman–Germanic Wars
- The course of the Gothic War
| Date | 378 |
| Location | Constantinople, Eastern Roman Empire (modern-day Istanbul, Turkey) |
| Result | Roman victory |

Belligerents
| Eastern Roman Empire; Tanukhids | Goths |

Commanders and leaders
| Domnica | Fritigern |

The Battle of Constantinople was a Gothic attack on Constantinople in 378 following the Gothic victory at the Battle of Adrianople. The emperor Valens's widow Domnica prepared the defence, and also reinforced the city with Arab warriors, who performed excellently in combat. It is said that the Goths were impressed when one of the Arab warriors stormed out of the city naked, slaughtered enemies, and drank blood from the neck of a decapitated Goth. Other sources maintain that the Goths actually abandoned the attack because they were greatly outnumbered.

In the end, Goths did not enter the city and retreated to Thrace and Moesia.
