= Battle of Thessalonica (380) =

Battle in 380 between the Goths and the Romans

Coordinates: 40.6403°N 22.9439°E

- Part of the Gothic War of 376–382 and the Roman–Germanic Wars
- The course of the Gothic War
Date	380
Location	near Thessalonica, Macedonia, Eastern Roman Empire (modern-day Thessaloniki, Macedonia, Greece)
Result	Gothic victory

Belligerents
Goths	Eastern Roman Empire

Commanders and leaders
Fritigern	Theodosius I

The Battle of Thessalonica was fought in the summer or autumn of 380 by Fritigern's Goths and a Roman army led by Theodosius I. Reconstituted after Adrianople, the East Roman army suffered another major defeat. Theodosius retreated to Thessalonica and surrendered control of operations to the Western Emperor, Gratian.
