= Alavivus =

Alavivus (flourished in 4th century AD) was a Gothic co-king of a group of Thervingi together with Fritigern. Along with the latter he led the migration of the Thervingi from Dacia across the Danube into the Roman Empire in the late 4th century AD. Upon arrival in the Roman Empire, the Goths suffered from widespread famine, with some Gothic parents reportedly being forced to sell their children into slavery in return for rotten dog meat in order to avoid starvation. In 376, Valens' lieutenant Lupicinus invited Alavivus and Fritigern to a banquet to discuss provisions for their people, where Alavivus was assassinated. Fritigern on the other hand managed to escape, inciting a revolt which culminated with a decisive Gothic victory at the Battle of Adrianople.
