= Martyrians (Messalian sect) =

The Martyrians were an offshoot of the Massalian heresy in 4th century Syria.

According to Epiphanius of Salamis, when the Massalians were condemned to death, general Lupicinus was tasked with executing them. Their deaths gave rise to a new sect, who worshipped the corpses of the martyred.
