= Fritigern =

Gothic king (fl. 370s)

Fritigern (fl. 370s) was a Thervingian Gothic chieftain whose decisive victory at Adrianople during the Gothic War (376–382) led to favourable terms for the Goths when peace was made with Gratian and Theodosius I in 382.

== Name ==
Fritigern appears in the Latinized form Fritigernus. The Gothic name is reconstructed as *Frithugairns "desiring peace". The Germanized name under which Fritigern is honored in the Walhalla temple (1842) is Friediger.

== Conflicts against Athanaric ==
The earliest references to Fritigern concern the period between the attack on the Thervingi by Valens (367/9) and the Hunnic raids on the Thervingi (ca. 376). In this time, a civil war may have broken out between Fritigern and Athanaric, a prominent Therving ruler. The conflict between Fritigern and Athanaric is mentioned by Socrates Scholasticus, Sozomen, and Zosimus, but not by Ammianus Marcellinus and Philostorgius. Before or during this civil war, Fritigern converted to Arian Christianity. Athanaric's persecution of Christians mentioned by Sozomen, falls into this period. Athanaric seems to have won this war, as he later led the Thervingi in battle against the Huns in 376.

According to Socrates, Fritigern and Athanaric were rival leaders of the (Therving) Goths. As this rivalry grew into warfare, Athanaric gained the advantage, and Fritigern asked for Roman aid. The Emperor Valens and the Thracian field army intervened, Valens and Fritigern defeated Athanaric, and Fritigern converted to Christianity, following the same teachings as Valens. Sozomen follows Socrates' account. According to Zosimus, Athanaric (Athomaricus) was the king of the Goths (Scythians). Sometime after their victory at Adrianople, and after the accession of Theodosius, Fritigern, Alatheus, and Saphrax moved north of the Danube and defeated Athanaric, before returning south of the Danube.

== Danube crossing ==
In 376, the Thervings came under increasing pressure from the Huns, who had already conquered their kinsmen, the Greuthungi. Fritigern asked Valens to allow the Thervingi to cross the northern Roman border and settle in Moesia or Thracia, with the Danube River and Roman frontier forts protecting them from the Huns. Valens agreed to permit Fritigern's followers to enter the empire. In return, they would be subject to military service, but would be treated the same as other Roman subjects. As it turned out, neither happened. Meanwhile, Athanaric and many of his followers retreated to Caucaland ("the Highlands", presumably the Eastern Carpathians and Transylvania).

During the autumn of 376, the Romans helped Alavivus and Fritigern's people cross the Danube and settle in the province of Moesia. In the winter of 376/7, a famine hit the areas settled by the Thervingi and their appeals for help went unanswered. The Roman governors of the area, Lupicinus and Maximus, treated them badly. They sold them food only at extremely high prices, which forced many Goths to sell their children as slaves. They invited several Thervingi leaders to a feast, in which they killed some and took others hostage. Alavivus most likely remained a hostage, but Fritigern was able to escape and he became leader of the Thervingi. Soon he declared war on the Roman Empire.

== War against Valens ==
Fritigern decisively defeated Lupicinus at the Battle of Marcianople in 376. The Goths went on to pillage Moesia, and by 377 had gained control over most of the neighboring, richer province of Thracia. Valens, recognizing the severity of the situation, sent his general Traianus and asked for the aid of Western emperor Gratian, who sent Richomeres and Frigeridus to contain the Goths east of the Haemus. At the Battle of the Willows, combined troops of the Western and Eastern Empire barely withstood a larger number of Goths, forcing Fritigern to withdraw into a wagon fort to recuperate. Valens now sent Saturninus to support Traianus. Saturninus and Traianus built a number of fortifications to contain the Gothic camp, hoping to starve them out during the winter of 377/8 and to force them into an open field battle. Fritigern refused to abandon his fort, and instead managed to enlist the support of Hunnic and Alanic cavalry. Saturninus could no longer maintain his blockade and was forced to retreat, returning freedom of movement to Fritigern who again took to pillaging the countryside. In the summer of 377, the Goths had regained access to the Hellespont and the Black Sea. They sacked Dibaltum and Augusta Trajana, forcing Frigiderus to retreat to Illyria. The Goths now threatened Constantinople itself, and Valens was forced to extract significant forces from the Persian front, granting considerable concessions to the Sassanids. According to Socrates Scholasticus, the citizens of the capital accused Valens of neglecting their defense, urging him to confront the invaders. Valens moved his army to Melantias on 12 June, and sent Sebastianus with an advance force to engage Gothic raiding parties. Sebastianus successfully destroyed a number of raiding parties, forcing Fritigern to consolidate his forces in the area of Cabyle. Gratian was detained in the north in his campaign against the Alemanni (Battle of Argentovaria), and unable to support Valens, who had been waiting to engage the Goths throughout June and July. When Valens heard that the Goths were moving towards Adrianople, he decamped and marched to meet them. Around 7 August, Richomeres returned from the Western campaign with the message that Gratian was now approaching. According to Ammianus, Victor cautioned Valens to wait for Gratian, while Sebastianus urged for an immediate assault. Fritigern sent envoys with two letters on the night of 8 August. The first letter offered peace and a military alliance in exchange for territory in Thrace. The second letter, addressed privately to Valens, assured that he wished for peace, but asked Valens to remain mobilized so that he, Fritigern, could convince his own people of maintaining the peace. Valens rejected the proposal and marched to engage the Goths on the following day. Fritigern won a respite by further peace negotiations allowing his allied Greuthungi cavalry to draw near. In the ensuing Battle of Adrianople, the Goths won a decisive victory. The Roman army was routed and suffered heavy losses. Valens himself was killed in the aftermath of the battle. Fritigern besieged the city of Adrianople itself, without success.

The Goths retook control of much of the Balkan peninsula in the aftermath of the battle. The Eastern empire, now without an emperor, feared that the Gothic populations would ally themselves with Fritigern leading to widespread insurgence. Julius, successor to Lupicinus, ordered the massacre of all Goths living near the frontier. By 379, word of the massacres reached the Goths living in the interior provinces, leading to riots in Asia Minor. The Romans reacted by massacring the Goths in the interior provinces as well.

Fritigern continued the war for two years, with mixed success. Theodosius I succeeded Valens as emperor on 19 January 379. Gratian did acknowledge Theodosius as his co-emperor and granted him control over the imperial dioceses of Dacia and Macedonia, but he promptly returned to his northern front to deal with the Alemanni, leaving Theodosius to deal with the Gothic problem.

Theodosius drafted a new army from farmers and mercenaries. Many attempted to avoid the draft, some mutilating their own thumbs to avoid military service, and Theodosius responded with harsh punishments for deserters, forcing even those who had mutilated themselves into service. Theodosius' general Modares, a Goth himself, won a minor victory against Fritigern.

It appears that at this point, the Greuthungi split off the Gothic army and went to Illyricum. The Thervingi under Fritigern moved towards Greece, into Macedonia and Thessaly. Theodosius moved to intercept them, but his army disintegrated from desertions at Thessalonica, many of the barbarian mercenaries joining Fritigern. At this point, Gratian was once again willing to come to aid, and his generals Arbogast and Bauto successfully drove the Goths back into Thrace by the summer of 381. Peace negotiations were opened, with Richomeres and Saturninus conducting the negotiations for the Romans. Peace was declared on 3 October 382. Fritigern is not mentioned again in any source after 381, and his fate is uncertain, he may have been killed in the Greek campaign, or he may have been deposed as a condition for peace.
