= Battle of Dibaltum =

- Part of the Gothic War of 376–382 and the Roman–Germanic Wars
Date	377
Location	near Dibaltum, Thrace
Result	Gothic victory

Belligerents
Eastern Roman Empire	Goths; Huns; Alans

Commanders and leaders
Barzimeres †; Equitius (POW)	Unknown

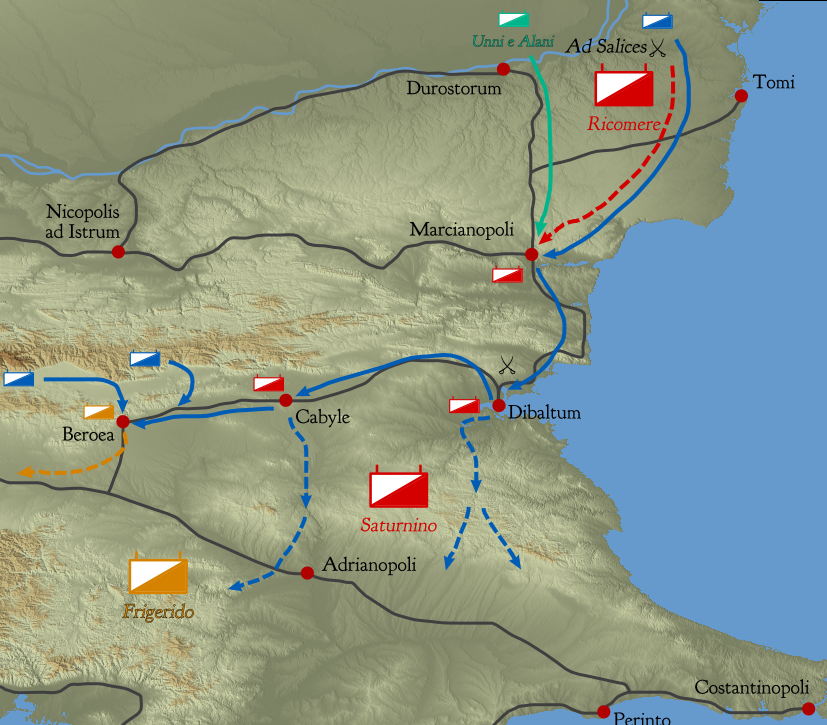
Roman-Gothic War 376-382, campaign 377

The Battle of Dibaltum was fought between the Roman army and an army of Goths, Huns, and Alans in the summer of 377. The battle took place outside the city of Dibaltum in Thrace and resulted in a Gothic victory.

== Background ==
After Saturninus issued the order to withdraw all soldiers from the Haemus Mountains, the Goths passed through from Moesia into Thrace and began pillaging the countryside. A force of Goths, joined by their new allies the Huns and Alans, left the area of Marcianopolis and travelled south in search of plunder, arriving close to the city of Dibaltum.

Barzimeres, tribunum scutariorum (Commander of the Guards), alongside other generals, had been transferred from the east to Thrace to combat the Goths, and began setting up camp outside Dibaltum upon his arrival. The Roman army consisted of a unit of scutarii cavalry, cornuti, and other units of infantrymen.

== Battle ==
The Goths surprised the Romans as they made camp for the night, and Barzimeres quickly arranged the army into battle formation. The Romans attacked the Goths in an effort to force them to withdraw, and the battle appeared as if it would last until nightfall. A large force of cavalry joined the battle late and surrounded and overwhelmed the Roman army. In the ensuing battle Barzimeres was killed, Equitius, cura palatii (Marshal of the Court), was captured, and most of the Roman army was destroyed.

== Aftermath ==
The Goths, Huns, and Alans sacked Dibaltum, and marched on Beroea to attack the general Frigeridus, but his scouts detected the invaders and Frigeridus promptly withdrew to Illyria. Equitius later managed to escape from captivity.

== Bibliography ==
- Boeft, Jan den; Drijvers, Jan Willem; Hengst, Daniël den; Teitler, Hans C. (2017). Philological and Historical Commentary on Ammianus Marcellinus XXXI. BRILL.
- Coombs-Hoar, Adrian (2015). Eagles in the Dust: The Roman Defeat at Adrianopolis AD 378. Pen and Sword.
- Dikov, Ivan (15 August 2015). "Archaeologists Unearth Odd Early Byzantine Fortress Tower in Ancient Roman City Deultum in Bulgaria's Debelt". Archaeology in Bulgaria.
- Hughs, Ian (2013). Imperial Brothers: Valentinian, Valens and the Disaster at Adrianople. Pen and Sword.
- Taylor, Donathan (2016). Roman Empire at War: A Compendium of Roman Battles from 31 B.C. to A.D. 565. Pen and Sword.
