= Smith & Wesson Model 457 =

Handgun, .45 caliber, Smith & Wesson Model 457
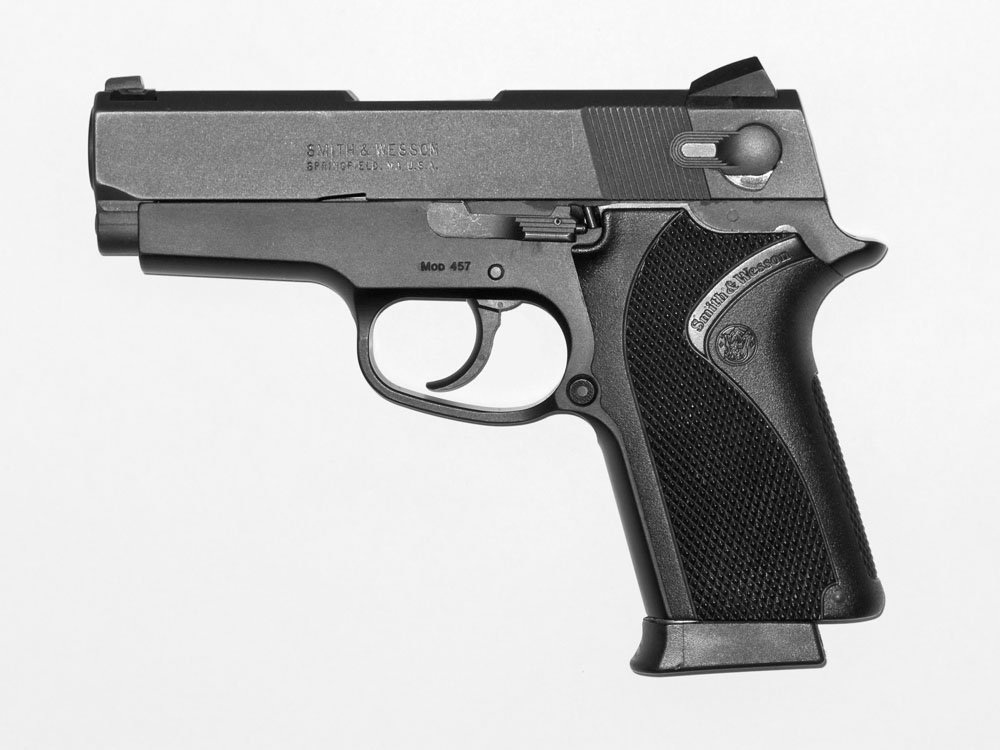
- Smith & Wesson Model 457 Third generation semi-automatic
- Type: Semi-automatic handgun
- Place of origin: United States

Production history
- Produced: 1996–2008

Specifications
- Mass: 820 g (29 oz)
- Length: 184 mm (7.25 in)
- Barrel length: 95 mm (3.75 in)
- Caliber: .45 ACP
- Action: Short recoil, DA/SA
- Sights: Front: Fixed post, White Dot, drift-adjustable for windage; rear: Fixed, Two-Dot, drift adjustable for windage

The Smith & Wesson Model 457 is a compact semi-automatic pistol from Smith & Wesson's Third Generation series of alloy and steel-framed handguns in company's Value Line of budget-priced auto pistols. The 457 is a compact pistol chambered for the .45 ACP cartridge. The design utilizes a double-action/single action trigger mechanism, meaning that the first shot is fired with long double-action pull, with following shots fired in single-action. The 457's external hammer omits a thumb spur, thereby reducing the risk of being caught on clothing during unholstering. A slide-mounted safety lever that drops the hammer from its cocked position when moved to the 'safe' position. The 457 has a 95 mm (3.75 in) barrel and 7-round magazine capacity. The Model 457 was produced with a matte-finish carbon steel slide and blackened aluminum alloy frame. Other versions include the Model 457S with a stainless steel slide and aluminum frame, and the Model 457TDA with a satin-finished aluminum frame and black carbon steel slide.

The compact design of the pistol makes it ideal for concealed carry, and the model developed a reputation for reliability, durability, and accuracy.
