= Battle of Marcianople =

376 Gothic victory over the Romans

- Part of the Gothic War of 376–382 and the Roman–Germanic Wars
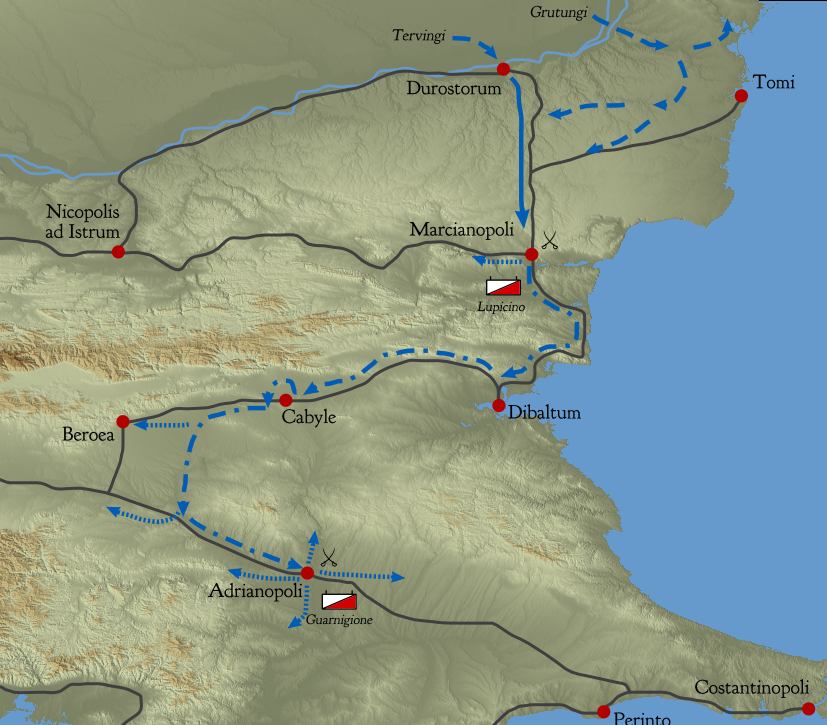
- Campaign of Roman Gothic war 376-382
Date	376
Location	Marcianople
Result	Gothic victory

Belligerents
Goths	Eastern Roman Empire

Commanders and leaders
Fritigern	Lupicinus

Strength
7,000–8,000	5,000

Casualties and losses
Unknown	Over half the army killed

The Battle of Marcianople or Marcianopolis took place in 376 following the Goths' migration over the Danube. It was the first notable battle of the Gothic War of 376–382.

After a failed Roman attempt to assassinate the Gothic leadership at a banquet in Marcianople, the Roman commander Lupicinius gathered all available troops, some 5,000 men, and attacked the 7,000–8,000 Thervingi Goths under Fritigern nine miles to the west of the town. While the Romans adopted a defensive posture on the battlefield, the Goths launched an immediate, all-out assault and bashed and slew the Romans with their shields, swords, and spears. Lupicinius fled as more than half of his army was killed on the spot. The Goths then re-armed themselves with Roman weaponry.

== Background ==
=== Introduction of the Goths into the Empire ===
In A.D. 376, after the death of Ermanaric's successor Vithimiris in battle against the Huns and the disintegration of the Ostrogothic kingdom, the Thervingi were forced to retreat before the feared Asian invaders. After the attempt to hold the Dniester against the enemy ended in failure and near encirclement and destruction, the Thervingi retreated; a part into what is now Romania under Athanaric, while the rest led by Fritigern fell back to the Danube, where they asked permission from the Roman Emperor Valens to be allowed to cross the river, which they thought could be held against the fearsome Asian barbarians. Valens, then emperor in the east, yielded his consent, but on the terms that their wealth, arms, and a certain number of their high-born youth, should be surrendered to him as pledges of their loyalty; and that they were to become the faithful servants of the Roman Empire, subject to the obligations as well as the benefits of residence within her boundaries; the desperate barbarians eagerly accepted his conditions, and close to a million Goths, including 200,000 effective warriors, according to Gibbon, were ferried across the Danube by the governors of Thrace. Eunapius states their number as 200,000 including civilians, but Peter Heather estimates that the Thervings may have had only 10,000 warriors and 50,000 people in total, with the Greuthungi about the same size.

=== Exploitation ===
Trouble arose, however, when the corruption of Valens' local ministers came into play. Incapable of resisting the temptation presented by a multitude of desperate, suppliant, and increasingly famished victims, Valens' ministers shamelessly extorted from the Goths their property and even the persons of their wives and daughters, in return for means of bare subsistence, which Valens had engaged to supply with a liberal hand. At the same time, they failed to disarm the Goths as intended, and their camp on the Danube was soon filled with the noise of war. Increasingly alarmed, Valens' generals resolved to disperse the Goths throughout the provinces, and gave orders for Fritigern, their leader, to march to Marcianopolis, where the respective places for each colony would be assigned. Fritigern, apparently still compliant, immediately hurried to obey the order.

== Battle ==
Having assembled the Goths near the city, Lupicinus, the Roman provincial commander in Thrace, who had himself played a conspicuous role in the exploitation and intolerable exactions to which the Goths had been subjected, invited their principal chiefs to a sumptuous feast, prepared in the hopes of conciliating them, and perhaps by bribery to discourage their revelation of his peculations to the emperor.

In the midst of the entertainment, however, the main body of the Goths which had been ordered to encamp outside the city, in an attempt to obtain some provisions from the inhabitants, broke into a disorderly struggle with the Roman garrison, which denied them entry into the city. As soon as the noise of the fighting reached Fritigern in Lupicinus's palace, he broke out with the rest of the chiefs, swords drawn, and rejoined the Gothic camp outside the city. War was at once declared upon the Empire.

Lupicinius gathered all available troops, some 5,000 men, and attacked the 7,000–8,000 Tervingi Goths under Fritigern nine miles to the west of the town. While the Romans adopted a defensive posture on the battlefield, the Goths launched an immediate, all-out assault and bashed and slew the Romans with their shields, swords, and spears. The veteran legions fought with marked bravery, but Lupicinius fled as more than half of his army was killed, and ultimately succumbed to the numbers and ferocity of the enraged barbarians. The Goths then re-armed themselves with Roman weaponry and promptly fell to devastating neighboring countryside, burning and desolating what they did not appropriate.
