= Battle of the Tanais River =

373 battle

Coordinates: 47°3′39″N 39°17′15″E

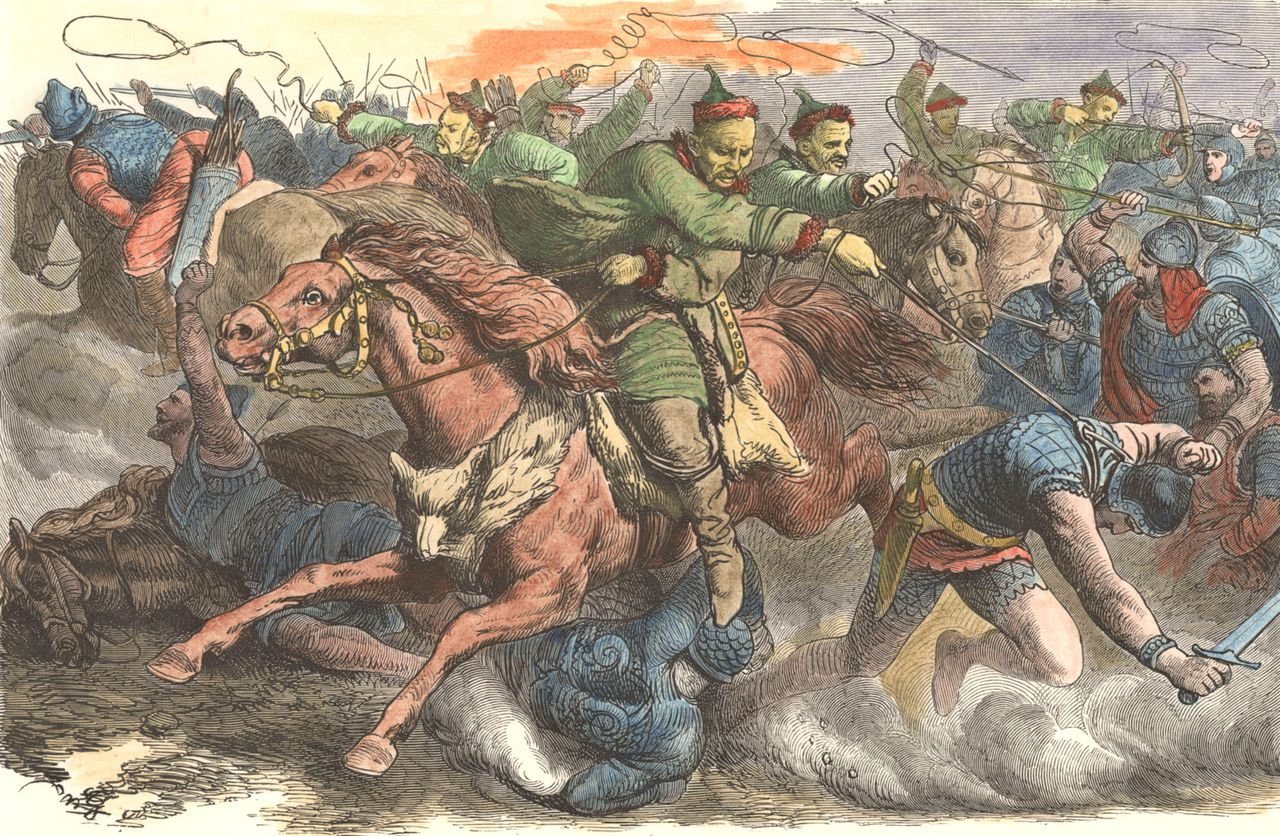
Date	373 AD
Location	Tanais River
Result	Hunnic victory

Belligerents
Hunnic Empire	Alans

The Battle of the Tanais River in 373 AD between the Huns and the Alans, was fought on the traditional border between Asia and Europe. The Huns were victorious.

Many Alanian villages and towns near the Terek and Kuban rivers were destroyed by the Huns. Some historians credit this battle as the beginning of the process of Germanic migration, in which the Huns pushed Germanic tribes into central and northern Europe, resulting in many conflicts between those tribes and the Roman Empire. On the banks of the Tanais, the military efforts of the Huns and Alans met with equal valor, but with uneven success. King of Alans was killed.

It was followed by a joint Hun-Alan invasion of the Gothic kingdom of Ermanaric.

== See also ==
- Germanic migrations

== Sources ==
- Spencer C. Tucker - A Global Chronology of Conflict: From the Ancient World to the Modern Middle East [6 volumes]: From the Ancient World to the Modern Middle East - 2777 pages - ISBN 1851096671 - p. 162
- John Keegan - A History of Warfare - 1994 - 432 pages - ISBN 9780679730828 - page 184
- Otto Maenchen-Helfen, Otto Helfen «The World of the Huns: Studies in Their History and Culture»

== Literature ==
- The 'evil' mind: Pt. 2: Combat motivation and war atrocities by Johan M.G. van der Dennen
- William Rosen - Justinian's Flea: Plague, Empire, and the Birth of Europe - 2007 - Viking - 367 pages - ISBN 0670038555 - page 42
