= Caucaland =

Caucaland is a region mentioned by Roman historian Ammianus Marcellinus as Caucalandenses locus, a place where the Goths located on the left bank of the Danube withdrew after the coming of the Huns. It is identified by some modern historians as Valea Strâmbă River (Mureş), and by Florin Constantiniu in Vrancea and Buzău Mountains.

According to British philologist and lexicographer Henry Bradley, Caucaland is derived from Hauhaland, the Gothic form of the English word 'Highland' (German 'Hochland'), and probably denotes the mountain region of Transylvania.
