= Sebastianus (magister peditum) =

4th Century Roman army officer

Sebastianus (Greek: Σεβαστιανός; died 9 August 378) was a Roman general who died at the Battle of Adrianople alongside the Emperor Valens during the Gothic War.

== Biography ==
Sebastianus is first mentioned as the dux Aegypti, serving around 356–358. He supported George of Cappadocia and his Arian supporters against Athanasius of Alexandria, expelling the supporters of Athanasius from the churches of Alexandria on 24 December 358. Athanasius, in his own account of the events, attributes this to Sebastianus being a Manichee. While in Egypt, he also received a visit from Libanius.

From 363 to 378, Sebastianus served as comes rei militaris, initially under the emperor Julian. Accompanying the emperor on Julian's Persian expedition against the Sasanian Empire, Julian gave Sebastianus a joint command with Procopius, with 30,000 to initially hold the Tigris before, if possible, joining King Arsaces II of Armenia and march southward, to reach Julian's army in Assyria.

Returning with the defeated army after the death of Julian, he probably accompanied Valentinian I to the western provinces in 364. In 368, while commanding the Illyrian and Italian armies, he was summoned by Valentinian to assist in the campaign against the Alemanni. Then in 375, Sebastianus was sent by Valentinian to aid the magister peditum Merobaudes in conducting some raids against the Quadi. When news of the emperor's death reached Merobaudes, he sent Sebastianus, who was unaware of Valentinian's death, to a distant posting to ensure that Sebastianus could not use his popularity with the troops to interfere with Merobaudes' plans for the succession, mitigating the risk that Sebastianus might possibly be raised by the troops to the rank of Augustus.

Sometime in 378, either through his own volition or through the intrigues of the imperial court eunuchs in the west, Sebastianus resigned his commission and travelled to the court of Valens at Constantinople. There, he was asked by the emperor for help in the Gothic War, appointing him to the post of magister peditum in the process. Gathering together a select band of infantry and cavalry, under Sebastianus' leadership the Romans wrested back some of the initiative by conducting a successful semi-guerilla type campaign against the Goths, with Sebastianus operating primarily in Thrace. As a result of his successful encounters, he forced the Gothic leader Fritigern to withdraw. However, his boasting of his military exploits encouraged Valens to seek a military encounter where the emperor would win a victory over the Goths. In the subsequent council of war, he was the principal officer who advised Valens not to wait until the forces of the Emperor Gratian arrived before bringing the Goths to a battle. Accompanying the emperor, he perished along with Valens in the Battle of Adrianople.

He was described by Ammianus Marcellinus as "a quiet and peace-loving man" and "a general of well-known vigilance", while he was praised by Eunapius for his military abilities and his contempt for wealth. Nothing is known about his family apart from the death of his wife in 357.
