= Alatheus and Saphrax =

Greuthungi chieftains

Alatheus and Saphrax were Greuthungi chieftains who served as co-regents for Vithericus, son and heir of the Gothic king Vithimiris.

== Alatheus ==
Alatheus (fl. 376–387) was a chieftain of the Greuthungi. He fought during the Hunnish invasion of 376, engaged in war with Rome from 376 to 383, and incursions into the Balkans in 387. He is most famous for his participation at the Battle of Adrianople in 378.

After the death of the Gothic King Vithimiris while fighting against the Huns in 376, Alatheus became, with Saphrax, co-regent and guardian of Vithericus, infant son of Vithimiris. He helped in the leadership of the great Gothic migration before the Hun onslaught, he crossed the Danube while Rome was busy with Thervingi refugees in that year. He soon allied himself with the Thervingi leaders Fritigern and Alavivus against Rome.

Alatheus eluded the Romans and rampaged through Thrace and Moesia in 377–378. He marched to Fritigern's aid against Emperor Valens at the battle of Adrianople in 378, in which Valens was killed when Alatheus' forces were victorious. He continued to raid Thrace and northern Greece, but was defeated by Theodosius the Great's general Promotus, and he settled on the north side of the Danube. He appeared on its banks again in 386, with the intention of invading the Roman provinces again. His forces were, however, repulsed, and Alatheus was slain.

== Saphrax ==
Saphrax (died c. 400) was a Greuthungi chieftain, who led the tribe along with Alatheus. Both names appear to have been Alanic; they may have been Sarmatian/Alan. After the death of the King Vithimiris while fighting against the Huns in 376, Alatheus and Saphrax became regents and guardians of Vithericus, infant son of Vithimiris. He and Alatheus commanded the Greuthungi, while Fritigern commanded the Thervingi, numbering an army of 10,000 (according to contemporary Ammianus Marcellinus) in the Battle of Adrianople in 378 against the Roman Empire. It is theorized that Saphrax led a Hun-Alan contingent. Ending in defeat for Rome, many of their followers rampaged through the Eastern Empire until they were settled years after by Theodosius treaties in Pannonia Prima. Remnants were recruited into the Roman army.

== Sources ==
- Burns, Thomas S. (1994). Barbarians Within the Gates of Rome: A Study of Roman Military Policy and the Barbarians, Ca. 375-425 A.D. Indiana University Press. pp. 56–. ISBN 0-253-31288-4.
- Burns, Thomas S. (1991). A History of the Ostrogoths. Indiana University Press. pp. 39–. ISBN 0-253-20600-6.
- Kim, Hyun Jin (18 April 2013). The Huns, Rome and the Birth of Europe. Cambridge University Press. pp. 201–. ISBN 978-1-107-06722-6.
