= 457 =

457 in various calendars
- Gregorian calendar: 457; CDLVII
- Ab urbe condita: 1210
- Assyrian calendar: 5207
- Balinese saka calendar: 378–379
- Bengali calendar: −137 – −136
- Berber calendar: 1407
- Buddhist calendar: 1001
- Burmese calendar: −181
- Byzantine calendar: 5965–5966
- Chinese calendar: 丙申年 (Fire Monkey); 3154 or 2947 — to — 丁酉年 (Fire Rooster); 3155 or 2948
- Coptic calendar: 173–174
- Discordian calendar: 1623
- Ethiopian calendar: 449–450
- Hebrew calendar: 4217–4218
- Hindu calendars
- Vikram Samvat: 513–514
- Shaka Samvat: 378–379
- Kali Yuga: 3557–3558
- Holocene calendar: 10457
- Iranian calendar: 165 BP – 164 BP
- Islamic calendar: 170 BH – 169 BH
- Javanese calendar: 342–343
- Julian calendar: 457; CDLVII
- Korean calendar: 2790
- Minguo calendar: 1455 before ROC 民前1455年
- Nanakshahi calendar: −1011
- Seleucid era: 768/769 AG
- Thai solar calendar: 999–1000
- Tibetan calendar: མེ་ཕོ་སྤྲེ་ལོ་ (male Fire-Monkey); 583 or 202 or −570 — to — མེ་མོ་བྱ་ལོ་ (female Fire-Bird); 584 or 203 or −569

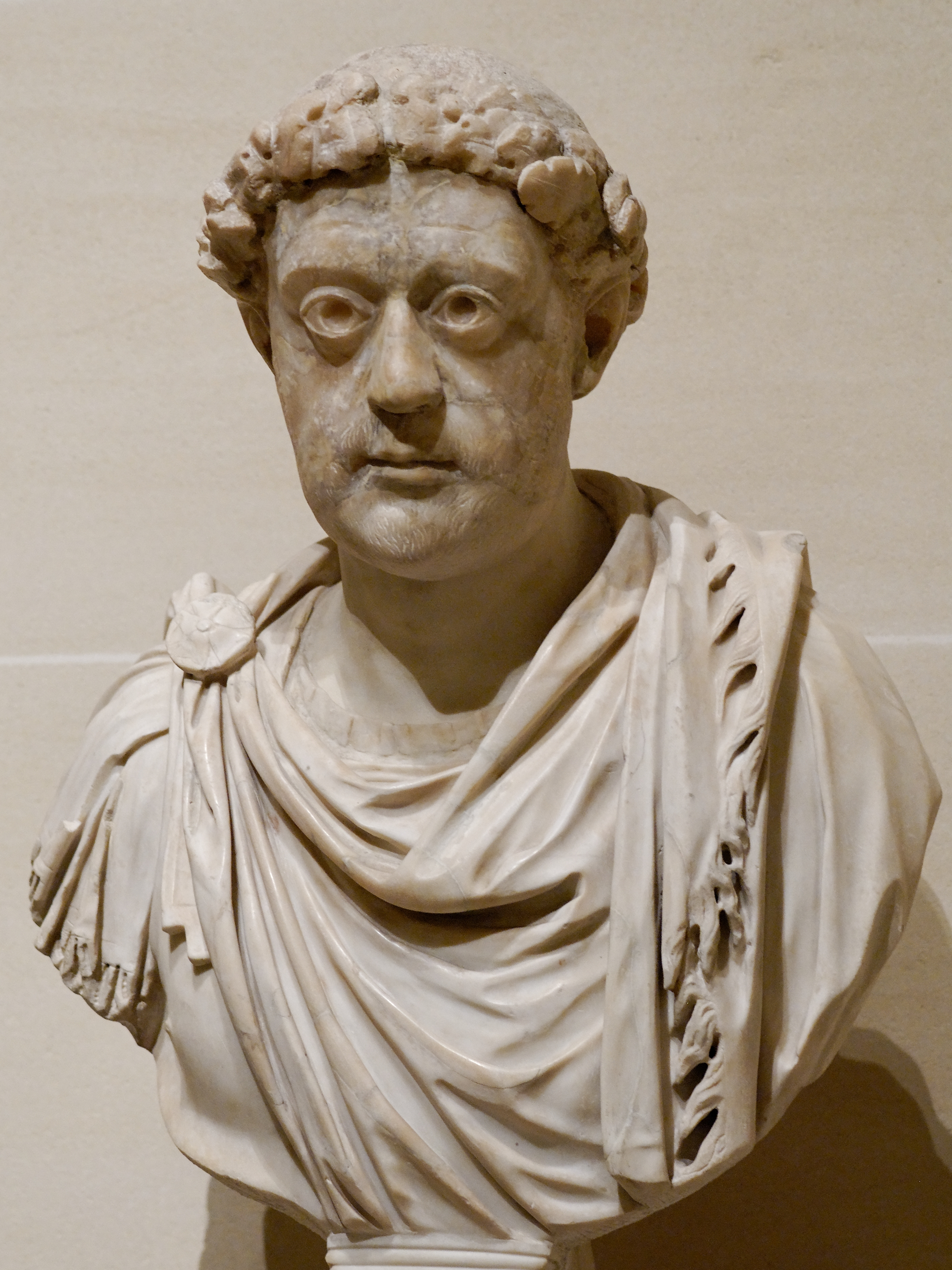
Emperor Leo I (457–474)

Year 457 (CDLVII) was a common year starting on Tuesday of the Julian calendar. At the time, it was known as the Year of the Consulship of Constantinus and Rufus (or, less frequently, year 1210 Ab urbe condita). The denomination 457 for this year has been used since the early medieval period, when the Anno Domini calendar era became the prevalent method in Europe for naming years.

== Events ==
=== By place ===
==== Roman Empire ====
- January 27 – Emperor Marcian dies at Constantinople, possibly of foot gangrene, an infection contracted during a long religious journey. He is buried in the Church of the Holy Apostles, together with his late wife Pulcheria.
- February 7 – Leo I, a Thraco-Roman (or Dacian) high-ranking officer, becomes the new emperor of the Eastern Roman Empire, reigning for nearly 20 years. He is first to accept the Byzantine crown from the hands of the patriarch of Constantinople.
- April 1 – Majorian is acclaimed emperor by the Roman army, after defeating 900 Alemanni near Lake Maggiore (Italy).
- December 28 – Majorian is crowned emperor of the Western Roman Empire and recognized by Pope Leo I. His rule is accepted in Italy, Dalmatia and some territories in Northern Gaul.

==== Europe ====
- According to the Anglo-Saxon Chronicle, 4,000 Britons are slain at Crecganford in battle against Hengist and his son Oisc of Kent.

==== Egypt ====
- Egyptian people rose in revolt and assassinate Proterius of Alexandria, and dragged his body through the streets of Alexandria and burned it. Timothy II Aelurus anti-Chalcedonian pope becomes elected by Egyptians.

==== Persia ====
- Yazdegerd II dies after a 19-year reign. He is succeeded by his son Hormizd III who seizes the Persian throne. His elder brother Peroz I rebels against him in Sistan (Iran). After months of civil war he defeats Hormizd and becomes the seventeenth Sasanian king of the Persian Empire.

=== By topic ===
==== Religion ====
- Victorius of Aquitaine computes new tables for celebrating Easter.

== Births ==
- Leontia, daughter-in-law of Western Roman Emperor Anthemius (d. 479)
- Medardus, bishop of Vermandois (approximate date)

== Deaths ==
- January 27 – Flavius Marcian, Roman emperor (b. 392)
- October 28 – Ibas, bishop of Edessa (modern Turkey)
- Avitus, emperor of the Western Roman Empire
- Framta, king of the Sueves
- Merovech, king of the Salian Franks (approximate date)
- Palladius, first bishop of Ireland (approximate date)
- Saint Proterius, Patriarch of Alexandria
- Theodoret of Cyrrhus, bishop and theologian
- Valerian of Abbenza, bishop and saint (b. 377)
- Yazdegerd II, king of the Persian Empire
