= Battle of Adrianople =

Battle between Eastern Roman Empire and Goths (378)

- Part of the Gothic War of 376–382 and the Roman–Germanic Wars
- Map of the battle, according to the History Department of the US Military Academy
Date	9 August 378
Location	Near Adrianople, Eastern Roman Empire (modern-day Edirne, Turkey) 41.81°N 26.50°E
Result	Gothic–Alan victory

Belligerents
Goths; Thervingi; Greuthungi; Alans	Eastern Roman Empire

Commanders and leaders
Fritigern (Thervingi); Alatheus (Greuthungi); Saphrax (Greuthungi)	Emperor Valens †; Sebastianus †; Traianus †; Victor; Ricomer

Strength
12,000–15,000 (Delbrück); 20,000 (Williams and Friell	15,000 (Heather); 30,000 (Williams and Friell)

Casualties and losses
Unknown	10,000–15,000 (Heather) or 20,000 (Williams & Friel) (roughly two-thirds of the Roman force)

The Battle of Adrianople, also known as Battle of Hadrianopolis, was fought between the Eastern Roman army led by the Roman emperor Valens and Gothic rebels (largely Thervings as well as Greutungs, non-Gothic Alans, and various local rebels), led by Fritigern. The battle took place on 9 August 378 in the vicinity of Adrianople, in the Roman province of Thracia (modern Edirne in European Turkey). It ended with an overwhelming victory for the Goths and the death of Emperor Valens.

As part of the Gothic War of 376–382, the battle is often considered the start of the events which led to the fall of the Western Roman Empire in the 5th century.

A detailed contemporary account of the lead-up to the battle from the Roman perspective was written by Ammianus Marcellinus and forms the culminating point at the end of his history.

== Background ==
The course of the Gothic War

In 376, the Goths, led by Alavivus and Fritigern, asked to be allowed to settle in the Eastern Roman Empire after being displaced by the invasions of the Huns. Hoping that they would become farmers and soldiers, the Eastern Roman emperor Valens allowed them to establish themselves in the Empire as allies (foederati). Once across the Danube and into Roman territory, however, the dishonesty of the Roman provincial commanders Lupicinus and Maximus led the newcomers to revolt after suffering many hardships.

Valens then asked Gratian, the western emperor, for reinforcements to fight the Goths. Gratian sent the general Frigeridus with reinforcements, as well as the leader of his guards, Richomeres. For the next two years preceding the Battle of Adrianople there was a series of running battles with no clear victories for either side.

In 378, Valens decided to take control himself and assembled additional troops from his own resources in Syria and from the reserves of the Western Roman Empire in Gaul.

Valens left Antioch for Constantinople, and arrived on 30 May. He appointed Sebastianus, newly arrived from Italy, to reorganize the Roman armies already in Thrace. Sebastianus picked 2,000 of his legionaries and marched towards Adrianople. Along the way, they came upon and ambushed small detachments of Goths. Fritigern as the leader of the Goths assembled his forces at Nicopolis and Beroe (now Stara Zagora) in order to deal with the Roman threat.

At the time, much of Gratian's army was in Pannonia where they were in the interim attacked across the Rhine by the Lentienses (part of the Alamanni). After the Romans regrouped and defeated the Lentienses near Argentaria (near modern-day Colmar, France), Gratian's army traveled east partly by sea and partly overland.

Upon learning of Sebastianus's success against the Goths and of Gratian's victory over the Lentienses, Valens was more than ready for a victory of his own. To link up with Sebastianus's forces before confronting the Goths, Valens moved his army from Melantias to Adrianople. On 6 August, reconnaissance informed Valens that approximately 10,000 Goths were advancing toward Adrianople from a position 25 kilometers to the north. In preparation at Adrianople, Valens fortified his camp with both ditches and ramparts.

Richomeres, sent in advance to Adrianople by Gratian, carried a letter asking Valens to wait for his arrival with reinforcements before engaging in battle. Valens' officers also recommended that he wait for Gratian, but Valens decided to fight without waiting, ready to claim the ultimate prize.

The Goths were also watching the Romans, and on 8 August, Fritigern sent an emissary to propose peace and an alliance in exchange for Roman territory. Sure that he would be victorious due to his supposed numerical superiority, Valens rejected these proposals. Valens' estimates of manpower, however, neglected to take into consideration part of the Gothic cavalry that had gone extended distances to forage.

== Composition of the Roman troops ==
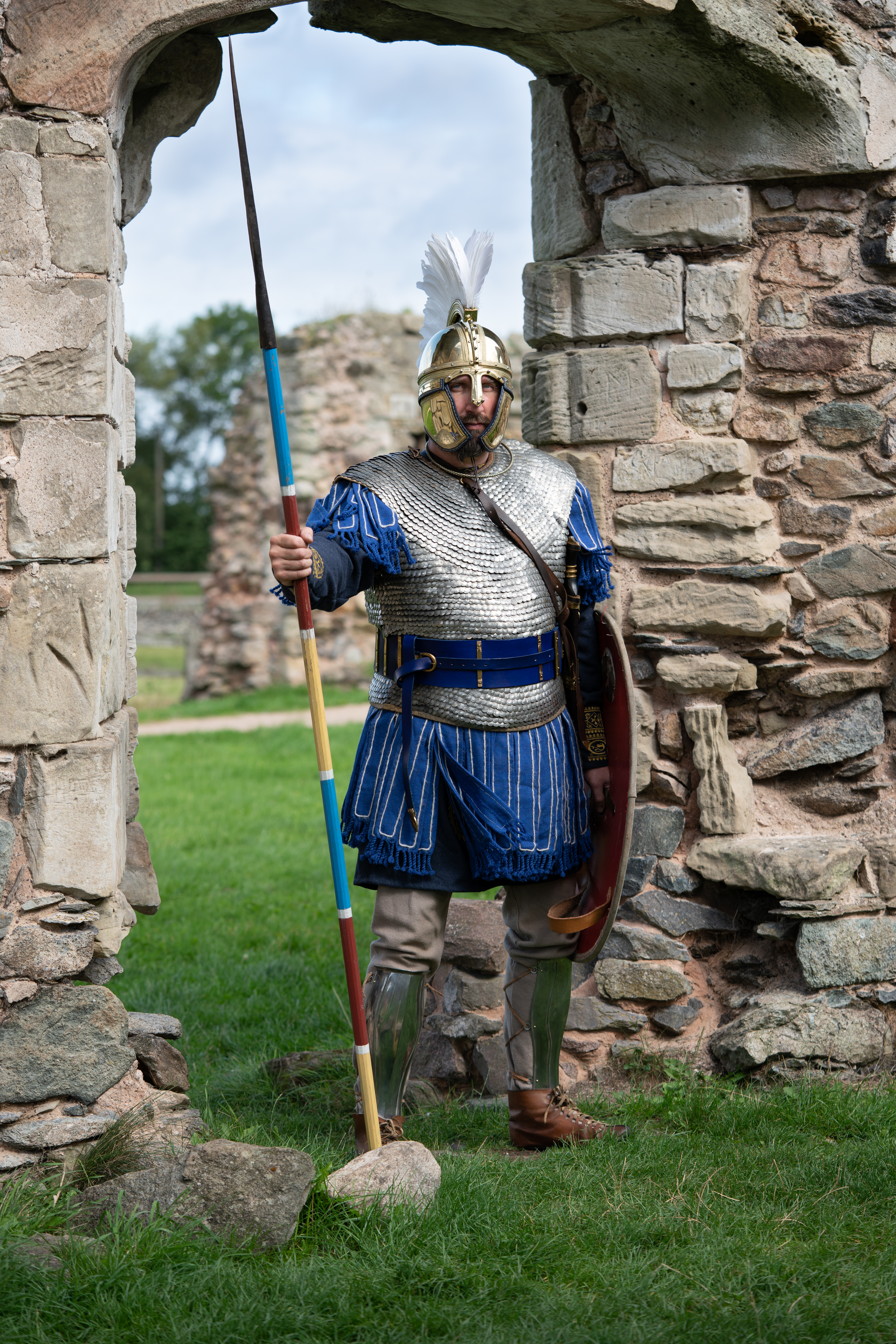
A re-enactor portraying a junior Roman officer of the 4th century AD. Soldiers would have worn a similar panoply to this.

Valens' army may have included troops from three Roman field armies: the Army of Thrace, based in the eastern Balkans, which may have sustained heavy losses in 376–377; the 1st Army in the Emperor's Presence; and the 2nd Army in the Emperor's Presence. Both armies in the Emperor's Presence were normally based at Constantinople in peacetime but had been committed to the Persian frontier in 376 and sent west in 377–378.

Valens' army included units of veterans, men accustomed to war. The entire force consisted of seven legions – among which were the Legio I Maximiana and imperial auxiliaries – of 700 to 1000 men each. The cavalry was composed of mounted archers (sagittarii) and Scholae (the imperial guard).

Shield pattern of the Germaniciani seniores, according to Notitia dignitatum.

Ammianus Marcellinus makes references to the following forces under Valens:

- Legions of Lanciarii, and Mattiarii. The Notitia Dignitatum lists both as legiones palatinae. Some claim that the Mattiarii may have been allied forces. However, mattiarii may refer to mace-armed infantry (mattea being Latin for mace). Valens is referred to as seeking protection with the Lanciarii and Mattiarii as the other Roman forces collapsed (apparently a sign of how desperate the battle had become). Eventually they were unable to hold off the Goths.
- A battalion of Batavians; they were apparently held in reserve and fled, given a reference to a comes named Victor attempting to bring them up into battle but unable to find them.
- Scutarii (shielded cavalry) and archers. As one or both were under the command of Bacurius the Iberian, these may have been allied auxiliary troops from Caucasian Iberia (part of modern Georgia) rather than Roman proper.

He also refers to the following officers:

- Ricomer, Frankish Comes of Gratian's Domestici (the corps of bodyguards of the emperor who were stationed in the imperial palace) sent to assist Valens in 376. He offered to act as a hostage to facilitate negotiations when Equitus refused. He survived the battle, indicated due to retreating.
- Sebastianus, arrived from Italy previously, and clearly operating as one of Valens' generals. Killed in the battle.
- Victor, master-general of the cavalry, a Sarmatian by birth, who led the officers counselling waiting for Gratian.
- Equitius, a relation of Valens, a tribune and high steward of the palace. He refused to act as a hostage, as he had been a prisoner of the Goths in Dibaltum and escaped, and now feared revenge. Killed in the battle.
- Bacurius (presumably Romanised Bakur), a native and possibly prince of Iberia, in command of the archers and/or scutarii with Cassio that accompanied Ricimer as hostage, and who attacked without orders.
- Traianus, apparently in command of Roman forces before Valens assumed command, who was described as an illustrious man whose death in the battle was a great loss. He was supposedly still alive when Valens sought refuge with the Lanciarii and Mattiarii.
- Victor, the comes who tried to bring the Batavian reserve battalion into action.
- Cassio, in command of the archers and/or scutarii accompanying Ricimer as hostage.
- Saturninus, magister militum vacans, referred to as being able to stay alive by retreating.
- Valerianus, Master of the Stable. Killed in battle.
- Potentius, tribune of the Promoti, a branch of the cavalry, son of Ursicinus, former commander of the forces. He "fell in the flower of his age, a man respected by all persons of virtue."
- Thirty five tribunes, including those of units and those of the staff, who were killed. Presumably there were more than this, but who survived.

=== Strength of Valens' army ===
Several modern historians have attempted to estimate the strength of Valens' army.

Warren Treadgold estimates that, by 395, the Army of Thrace had 24,500 soldiers, while the 1st and 2nd Armies in Emperor's Presence had 21,000 each. However, all three armies include units either formed (several units of Theodosiani among them) or redeployed (various legions in Thrace) after Adrianople. Moreover, troops were needed to protect Marcianopolis and other threatened cities, so it is unlikely that all three armies fought together.

Some modern historians estimated the real number of Roman troops to be as many as 15,000 men, 10,000 infantry and 5,000 cavalry.

=== Order of battle of Valens' army ===
It is not possible to precisely list the units of the Roman army at Adrianople. The only sources are Ammianus, who describes the battle but mentions few units by name, and the eastern Notitia Dignitatum, which lists Roman army units in the late 4th to early 5th century, after Theodosius. Many units listed in the Balkans were formed after Adrianople; others were transferred from other parts of the Empire, before or after Adrianople; others are listed in two or more sectors. Some units at Adrianople may have been merged or disbanded due to their losses. The Roman forces consisted of heavy infantry, various archers and cavalry.

== Composition of the Gothic forces ==
There were probably two main Gothic armies south of the Danube. Fritigern led one army, largely recruited from the Therving exiles, while Alatheus and Saphrax led another army, largely recruited from the Greuthung exiles.

Fritigern brought most if not all of his fighters to the battle and appears to have led the force the Romans first encountered. Alatheus and Saphrax brought their cavalry into action "descending like a thunderbolt" against the Romans. These forces included Alans.

The Gothic armies were mostly infantry, with some cavalry, which was significant in the Battle of Adrianople. Some older works attribute the Gothic victory to overwhelming Gothic numbers, to Gothic cavalry, and sometimes to Gothic use of stirrups. More recent scholarly works mostly agree that the armies were similarly sized, that the Gothic infantry was more decisive than their cavalry and that neither the Romans nor the Goths used stirrups until the 6th century, probably brought by the Avars.

Ammianus records that the Roman scouts estimated 10,000 Gothic troops, but Ammianus dismissed this as an underestimate. This appears to be due to Alatheus and Saphrax's forces being away when the Roman scouts estimated the Goths' numbers before battle. Several modern historians have estimated the strength of the Gothic armies at 12,000–15,000.

Ammianus notes the important role of the Gothic cavalry. Charles Oman, believing that the cavalry were the majority of the Gothic force, interpreted the Battle of Adrianople as the beginning of the dominance of cavalry over infantry for the next thousand years. Some other historians have taken the same view. T. S. Burns and other recent historians argue that the infantry were the vast majority of the Gothic force, and that the battle had little effect on the relationship between infantry and cavalry.

== Location ==
The battle took place within a few hours' march of the city of Adrianopolis, but its precise location is uncertain. Three possible locations of the battle have been discussed in modern historiography:

- One thesis suggests that the Gothic camp and the battleground were located to the north of Adrianopolis, west of the Tonzos river but east of Hebros river (41.81°N 26.50°E).
- Another locates the battlefield again north of the city, but east of Tonzos river, near the contemporary Turkish village of Muratçalı (41.81°N 26.60°E).
- The third thesis adopts a location east of the city, near the contemporary Turkish village of Demirhanlı (41.70°N 26.74°E), i.e. assuming that Valens was marching due East, starting from the Adrianople city walls.

== Battle ==
On the morning of 9 August, Valens decamped from Adrianople, where he left the imperial treasury and administration under guard. The reconnaissance of the preceding days informed him of the location of the Gothic camp north of the city. Valens arrived there around noon after marching for eight miles over difficult terrain.

The Roman troops arrived tired and dehydrated, facing the Gothic camp that had been set up on the top of a hill. The Goths, except for their cavalry, defended their wagon circle, inside of which were their families and possessions. Fritigern's objective was to delay the Romans, in order to give enough time for the Gothic cavalry to return. The fields were burnt by the Goths to delay and harass the Romans with smoke, and negotiations began for an exchange of hostages. The negotiations exasperated the Roman soldiers who seemed to hold the stronger position, but they gained precious time for Fritigern.

Some Roman units began the battle without orders to do so, believing they would have an easy victory, and perhaps over-eager to exact revenge on the Goths after two years of unchecked devastation throughout the Balkans. The imperial scholae of shield-archers under the command of the Iberian prince Bacurius attacked, but lacking support they were easily pushed back. Then the Roman left wing reached the circle of wagons, but it was too late. At that moment, the Gothic cavalry, returning from a foraging expedition, arrived to support the infantry. The cavalry surrounded the Roman troops, who were already in disarray after the failure of the first assault. The Romans retreated to the base of the hill where they were unable to maneuver, encumbered by their heavy armor and long shields. The casualties, exhaustion, and psychological pressure led to a rout of the Roman army. The cavalry continued their attack, and the killing continued until nightfall.

In the rout, the Emperor himself was abandoned by his guards. Some tried to retrieve him, but the majority of the cavalry fled. Valens' final fate is unknown; he may have died anonymously on the field. His body was never found. An alternative story circulated after the battle that Valens had escaped the field with a bodyguard and some eunuchs and hid in a peasant's cottage. The enemy attempted to pillage the cottage, apparently unaware Valens was inside. Valens' men shot arrows from the second floor to defend the cottage and in response the Goths set the cottage on fire. The bodyguard leaped out the window and told the Goths who was inside, but it was too late. Valens perished in the flames.

== Aftermath ==
According to the historian Ammianus Marcellinus, the Goths immediately marched to the city of Adrianople and attempted to take it; Ammianus gives a detailed account of their failure. Ammianus refers to a great number of Roman soldiers who had not been let into the city and who fought the besieging Goths below the walls. A third of the Roman army succeeded in retreating, but the losses were uncountable. Many officers, among them the general Sebastianus, were killed in the worst Roman defeat since the Battle of Edessa, the low point of the Crisis of the Third Century. The battle was a crushing blow for the late Empire, resulting in the destruction of the East Roman army's core, the deaths of valuable administrators, and the destruction of nearly all armories on the Danubian provinces following the battle. The lack of reserves for the army worsened the recruitment crisis. Despite the losses, the Battle of Adrianople did not mark the end of the Roman Empire because the imperial military power was only temporarily crippled.

The defeat at Adrianople signified that the barbarians, fighting for or against the Romans, had become powerful adversaries. The Goths, though partly tamed by Valens' successor Theodosius I (who accepted them once more as allied tribes), were never expelled, exterminated, or assimilated; they remained as a distinct entity within its frontiers, for a few years allies, later semi or fully independent or often hostile.

The long-term implications of the Battle of Adrianople for the art of war are disputed. Charles Oman in 1885 wrote that the battle represented a turning point in military history, with heavy cavalry triumphing over Roman infantry and ushering in the age of the medieval knight. T. S. Burns disputed this in a 1973 book, writing that the Gothic army's cavalry arm was fairly small, that Valens would actually have had more cavalry, and that while the role of Fritigern's cavalry was critical to his victory, the battle was a mainly infantry versus infantry affair. The medieval knight was not to rise for several centuries after Adrianople.
