= Valerian of Abbenza =

Christian saint (377–457)

Saint Valerian of Abbenza

Bishop and Martyr
- Born: 377
- Died: 457
- Venerated in: Roman Catholic Church, Eastern Orthodox Church
- Feast: 15 December; 28 November

Valerian (377–457) was bishop of Abbenza in North Africa, probably Dioecesis Zabensis.(it) He was martyred in 457 when he refused to surrender the sacred vessels of his church to the Vandals led by Arian king Geiseric, who outlawed him, notwithstanding his great age, eighty years. Valerian was driven out of the city and left to die of exposure. His feast day is celebrated on December 15.

== Sources ==
- Jones, Terry. "Valerian". Patron Saints Index.
- "St. Valerian". Saints and Angels. Catholic Online.
