= Frigeridus (dux) =

Roman general during the 4th century

Frigeridus (fl. 370–377 AD) was a Roman general of Germanic descent who played a significant role in the late Roman Empire during the 4th century. Under Valentinian I he was the military commander (dux) of Pannonia. Following the Battle of Marcianople, he was directed by Gratian, Valentian's successor, to lead forces from Pannonia to Thrace to deal with the invading Goths. He did not command his own forces in the Battle of Ad Salices, ostensibly due to an attack of gout.

Following the Roman defeat at the Battle of Dibaltum, the Goths and Taifali under Farnobius planned to attack Frigeridus's fortified position at Beroea. Learning this he retreated to Illyricum, reinforced, returned and defeated Farnobius's forces, killing him. The survivors were settled in Italy.

To prevent the marauding Goths from moving northwest into Pannonia, Frigiderus fortified the pass at Succi.

Ammianus called him a "careful and active leader", and criticized his replacement with a general named Maurus who he characterized as venal, changeable and unreliable.
