= Lupicinus (comes per Thracias) =

Roman army officer

Lupicinus (fl. 368–377) was a Roman army officer in late antiquity who served under the emperors Valentinian I and Valens. He distinguished himself in the schola Gentilium fighting the Alemanni in 368. He was serving as a military tribune in Pannonia in 376.

Lupicinus was serving as the commander of Roman troops in the diocese of Thrace (comes rei militaris per Thracias) in c. 377 during the events which resulted in the Gothic War. There he oversaw the settlement of the Goths within the empire along the Lower Danube, after which, he and the dux Maximus foolishly proceeded to extort and starve them. At one point, they slaughtered dogs and offered them to the starving tribes at the price of one boy to be sold into slavery for one dog. Famished and humiliated, the Goths broke into an open revolt that led to the Gothic War of 376 and the catastrophic Battle of Adrianople in which the emperor Valens was killed.

After orchestrating a failed assassination attempt of the Gothic leaders while ostensibly meeting with them to discuss a peace, Lupicinus led his troops into a total defeat at the Battle of Marcianople. It was said that Lupicinus' actions in the battle were both foolish and cowardly. He was apparently superseded by new commanders in 377. It is unknown if Lupicinus was cashiered, executed or killed in subsequent battles. His actions directly and dynamically showed that the Roman Empire was declining.

According to Epiphanius of Salamis, when the heretical sect known as the Massalians was condemned to death, Lupicinus was tasked with executing its members. Their deaths reportedly gave rise to a new sect, the Martyrians, who venerated them as martyrs.
