= Battle of the Willows =

Battle between the Goths and the Roman Empire

Coordinates: 43.2167°N 27.5833°E

- Part of the Gothic War of 376–382 and the Roman–Germanic Wars
Date	377
Location	Ad Salices (exact unknown), in Moesia, Bulgaria
Result	Inconclusive

Belligerents
Goths	Western Roman Empire; Eastern Roman Empire

Commanders and leaders
Fritigern; Sueridas; Colias	Richomeres; Profuturus; Traianus

Strength
10,000	5,000–6,000

Casualties and losses
Heavy	Heavy

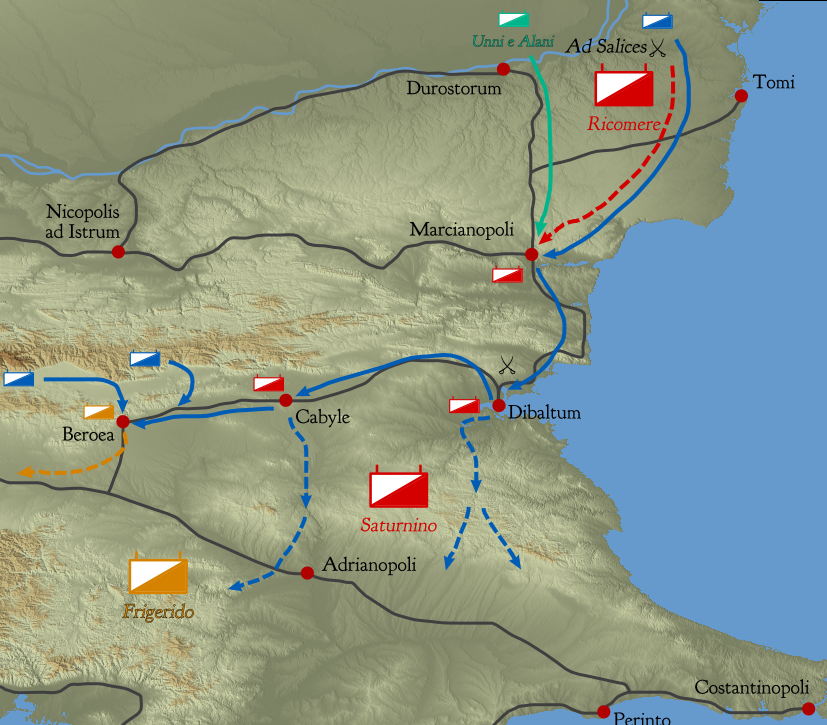
Map of campaign

The Battle of the Willows (377) took place at a place called ad Salices ("town by the willows"), or according to Ammianus, a road way-station called Ad Salices ("by the Willows"); probably located within 15 kilometres of Marcianople (modern day Dobrudja, Bulgaria), although its exact location is unknown. Forces from the Western Roman Empire under the command of Richomeres advanced westward, while forces of the eastern Roman Empire under Traianus and Profuturus advanced northward where they joined forces to attack the Goths who had recently rebelled under command of Fritigern. and were laying waste to the northern Balkans.

The only extant description comes from Ammianus who left few details; he gives a lengthy description of the dead and dying, but no information on the number of combatants. At one point the Roman left wing gave way, but it was re-enforced and held. The battle ended with nightfall. The result was a bloody draw with both sides taking many losses; the Goths remained encamped behind their war-wagon circle for over a week after the battle.

== See also ==
- Gothic War (376–382)
