= 366 =

366 in various calendars
- Gregorian calendar: 366; CCCLXVI
- Ab urbe condita: 1119
- Assyrian calendar: 5116
- Balinese saka calendar: 287–288
- Bengali calendar: −228 – −227
- Berber calendar: 1316
- Buddhist calendar: 910
- Burmese calendar: −272
- Byzantine calendar: 5874–5875
- Chinese calendar: 乙丑年 (Wood Ox); 3063 or 2856 — to — 丙寅年 (Fire Tiger); 3064 or 2857
- Coptic calendar: 82–83
- Discordian calendar: 1532
- Ethiopian calendar: 358–359
- Hebrew calendar: 4126–4127
- Hindu calendars
- Vikram Samvat: 422–423
- Shaka Samvat: 287–288
- Kali Yuga: 3466–3467
- Holocene calendar: 10366
- Iranian calendar: 256 BP – 255 BP
- Islamic calendar: 264 BH – 263 BH
- Javanese calendar: 248–249
- Julian calendar: 366; CCCLXVI
- Korean calendar: 2699
- Minguo calendar: 1546 before ROC 民前1546年
- Nanakshahi calendar: −1102
- Seleucid era: 677/678 AG
- Thai solar calendar: 908–909
- Tibetan calendar: ཤིང་མོ་གླང་ལོ་ (female Wood-Ox); 492 or 111 or −661 — to — མེ་ཕོ་སྟག་ལོ་ (male Fire-Tiger); 493 or 112 or −660

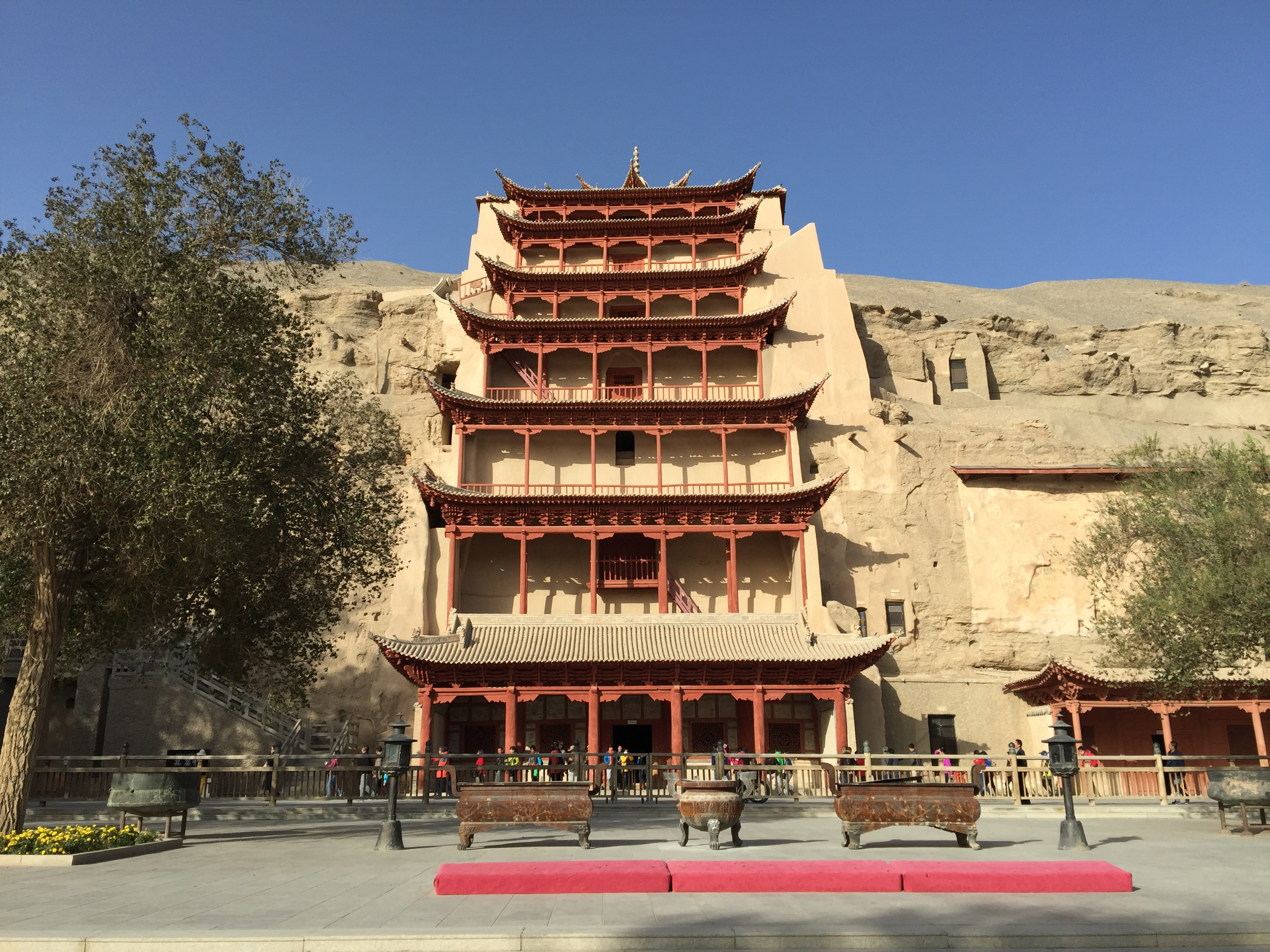
Mogao Caves (China)

Year 366 (CCCLXVI) was a common year starting on Sunday of the Julian calendar. At the time, it was known as the Year of the Consulship of Gratianus and Dagalaifus (or, less frequently, year 1119 Ab urbe condita). The denomination 366 for this year has been used since the early medieval period, when the Anno Domini calendar era became the prevalent method in Europe for naming years.

== Events ==
=== By place ===
==== Roman Empire ====
- January 2 – The Alamanni cross the frozen Rhine in large numbers, and invade the Gallic provinces. They capture Alsace and a large part of the Swiss Plateau.
- April – Battle of Thyatira: Emperor Valens defeats the troops of Procopius, bringing an end to his revolt; Serenianus and Marcellus are killed. Procopius flees the battlefield, but is executed by Valens.
- Valens builds a pontoon bridge across the Danube, and drives the Visigoths further north, where they will come under pressure from the advancing Huns.
- Winter – Emperor Valentinian I appoints Jovinus, his Master of the Horse (Magister Equitum), general of the army. He defeats the Alamanni in three successive battles, and pushes them out of Gaul.

=== By topic ===
==== Art and Science ====
- The Tabula Peutingeriana, a map showing Roman possessions and roads, is created about this time.

==== Religion ====
- January 31 – Athanasius of Alexandria returns from his fifth exile. He has spent four months in his ancestral tomb outside Alexandria.
- Buddhist monk Lè Zūn has a vision of "golden rays of light shining down on 1,000 Buddhas", resulting in the creation of the Mogao Caves.
- October 1 – Pope Liberius dies after a 14-year reign and is succeeded by Damasus I as 37th pope. Romans unhappy with this choice elect the antipope Ursicinus.

== Births ==
- January 18 – Valentinianus Galates, Roman emperor (d. 370)
- Yao Xing, Chinese emperor of the Later Qin Dynasty (d. 416)

== Deaths ==
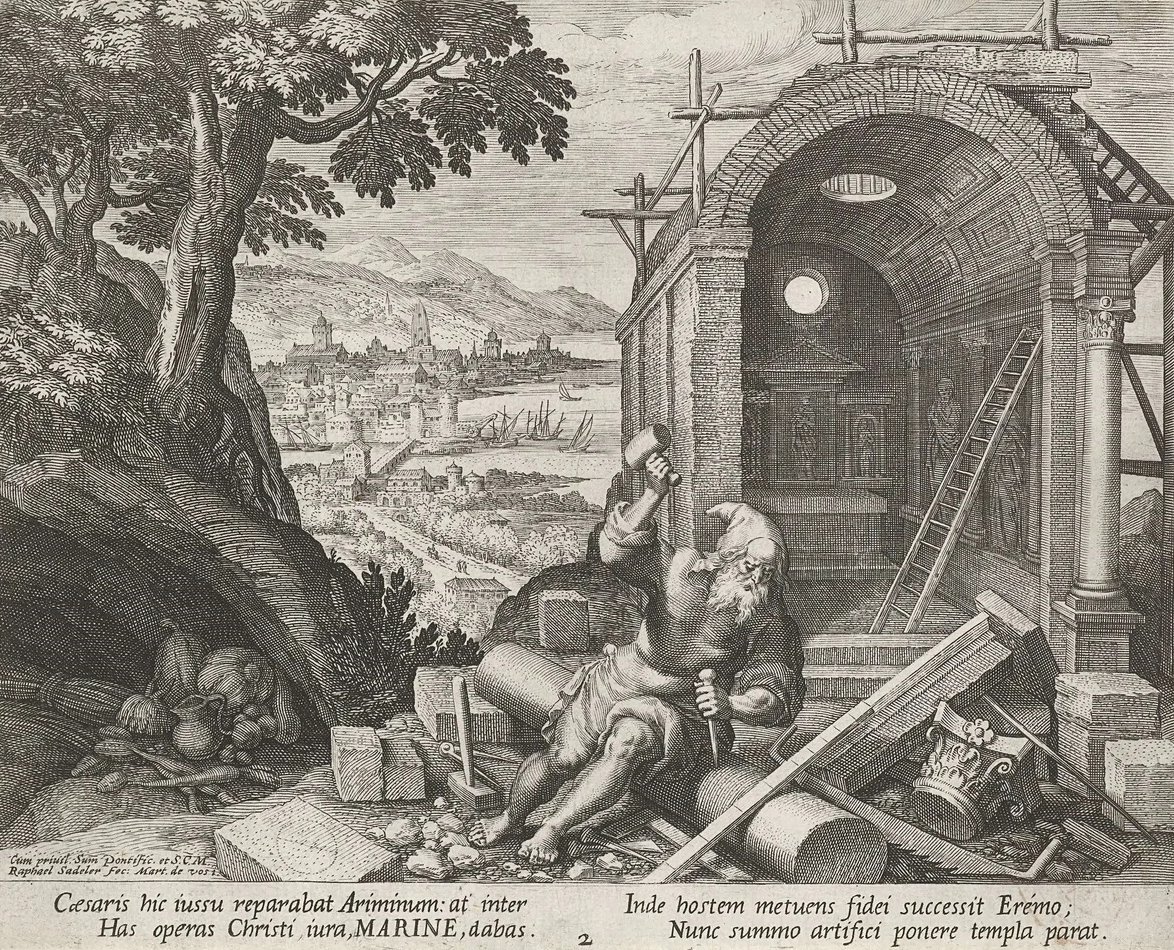
Saint Marinus

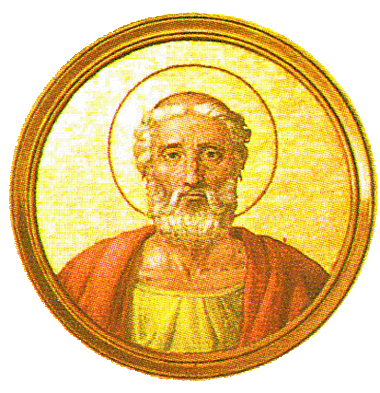
Pope Liberius

- May 16 – Ajabel, Christian priest and martyr
- May 27 – Procopius, Roman general and usurper
- August 1 – Leo of Montefeltro, Christian bishop and saint
- September 24 – Liberius, pope of the Catholic Church (b. 310)

=== Date unknown ===
- Acacius of Caesarea, Christian bishop
- Marcellus, Roman general and usurper
- Marinus, Christian hermit and saint (b. 275)
- Serenianus, Roman general of the Imperial Guard
- Yu Daolian, Chinese empress and wife of Jin Feidi
- Zhi Dun, Chinese Buddhist monk and philosopher (b. 314)
