= Gothic Revolt of Tribigild =

- Part of the Gothic Wars and Roman–Germanic Wars
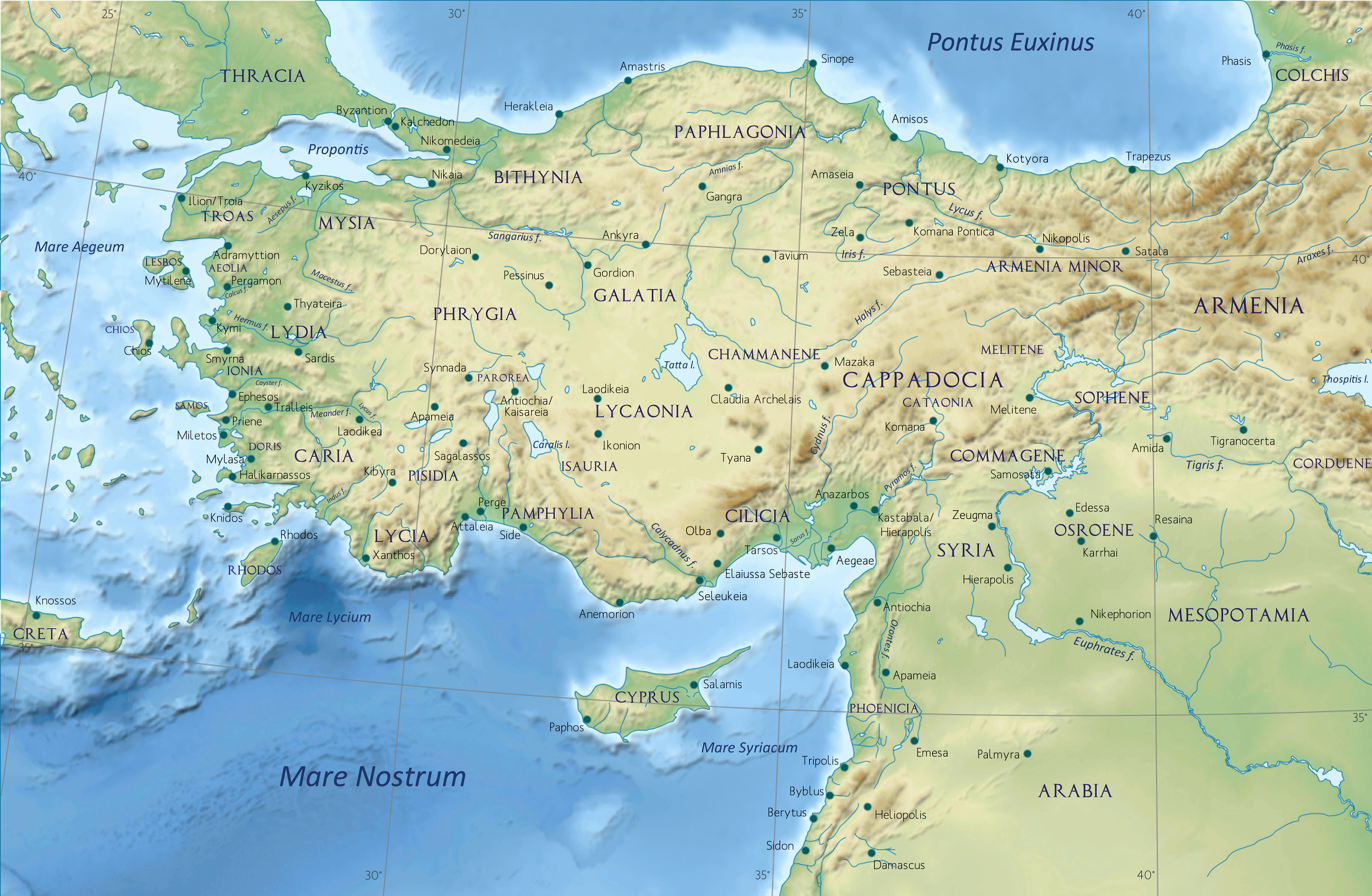
- Map of Anatolia
Date	399–400
Location	Anatolia
Result	Roman victory

Belligerents
Eastern Roman Empire	Goths

Commanders and leaders
Eutropius; Aurelianus; Leo; Fravitta	Tribigild; Gainas

Strength
Unknown	Unknown

The Gothic Revolt of Tribigild was a revolt in 399–400 of the Goths in Anatolia (Eastern Roman Empire) that caused a major political crisis during the reign of Emperor Arcadius (395–408). The uprising was led by Tribigild, leader of a unit of Goths within the Roman army. Initially, the uprising only took place in Anatolia, but after the commander-in-chief of the Eastern Roman army Gainas intervened and sided with the Goths, it became a threat to the unity within the Eastern empire.

== Prelude ==
The Anatolian Goths originally lived north of the Danube. In 386 they fled the rule of the Huns and ended up in the Roman Empire under the leadership of Odotheus. After conflicts with the Roman army in which Odotheus was killed, the Goths were subjugated and transferred to the region of Phrygia in Anatolia. Some served in the army, others were put to work on the fields as laborers. The Romans made extensive use of the Goths for military services. As foederati, they had the same status as their fellow citizens who stayed in Moesia under Alaric a few years earlier. In Nakoleia (Anatolia), Tribigild, with the rank of comes or count, led a department of mounted Goths who were centrally stationed here to guard the military roads through the region.

According to current historians, the same situation arose in Anatolia as with the Goths who had fought alongside Emperor Theodosius in the Battle of the Frigidus in 394. Gothic militias under Eutropius had successfully fought the Huns and Crimean Goths in 397/8. but felt their role in the victory was not sufficiently rewarded. It is believed that this caused the Goths in Anatolia to revolt.

In addition, according to surviving contemporary history, prior to the rebellion there was a power struggle between Gainas, who was of Gothic descent, and the influential imperial counselor Eutropius, who could exert the most influence on the young emperor Arcadius.

== Revolt ==
The rebellion of the Anatolian Goths broke out in 399 and Tribigild soon emerged as the leader of the revolt. In the first days of their uprising they were very successful. The sources emphasize that the Goths conquered cities, this is confirmed by the account of Zosimus:

«"So it happened that Tribigildus, without anyone opposing him, conquered every city and killed all the inhabitants and soldiers".»

Zosimus places special emphasis on the fact that the Goths under Tribigild killed both civilians and soldiers when they conquered a city, a point poetically reiterated by Claudian:

«"The barbarian burst into those cities that were so peaceful, so easy to capture. There was no hope of safety, no chance of escape. Long and peaceful centuries had brought the crumbling stones from their battlements."»

This shows that the Goths of Tribigild knew from experience how to besiege cities. They had gained this experience during military campaigns of the Roman army.

The revolt spread throughout Asia Minor as a growing number of dissatisfied peasants and slaves joined in addition to the Goths. In what followed, Phrygia, Lydia, Pamphylia and Pisidia were sacked and an imperial army sent by Eutropius and led by Leo was defeated. Tribigild was held up alone at Pamphylia, where he had to traverse roads completely unsuitable for his mounted cavalry.

=== Gainas coup ===
After Leo's defeat, a new army stationed in Thrace was ordered to advance to Phrygia to quell the rebellion. This army was commanded by Gainas, but made little move against Tribigild. The reason for this was that Gainas used the uprising to achieve his own political agenda. At the beginning of the rebellion, Gaines was still the subordinate party at court, his position vis-à-vis Eutropius was extremely weak, but as the Tribigild rebellion developed and the imperial army that had to put an end to the rebellion was completely defeated, his influence increased. Eutropius ended up sidetracked and Emperor Arcadius elevated Gainas to his commander-in-chief.

According to Zosimus, Gainas did not immediately take action. He accused him of delaying in an attempt to undermine the central government or to give Tribigild more time to do greater damage. However, this plot is not mentioned by either Claudianus or Philostorgius, contemporaries of Zosimus, and it seems that these allegations by Zosimus, a few generations later, were aimed at degrading the character of Gainas and putting him in a bad light. In contrast, it seems more logical that Gainas, who first found himself in a privileged imperial position after a failed attempt by Eutropius to put down the rebellion, refrained from attacking Tribigild on the basis of a calculated plan. He advised Arcadius to negotiate with Tribigild and insisted that Eutropius be removed first.

=== Alliance between Tribigild and Gainas ===
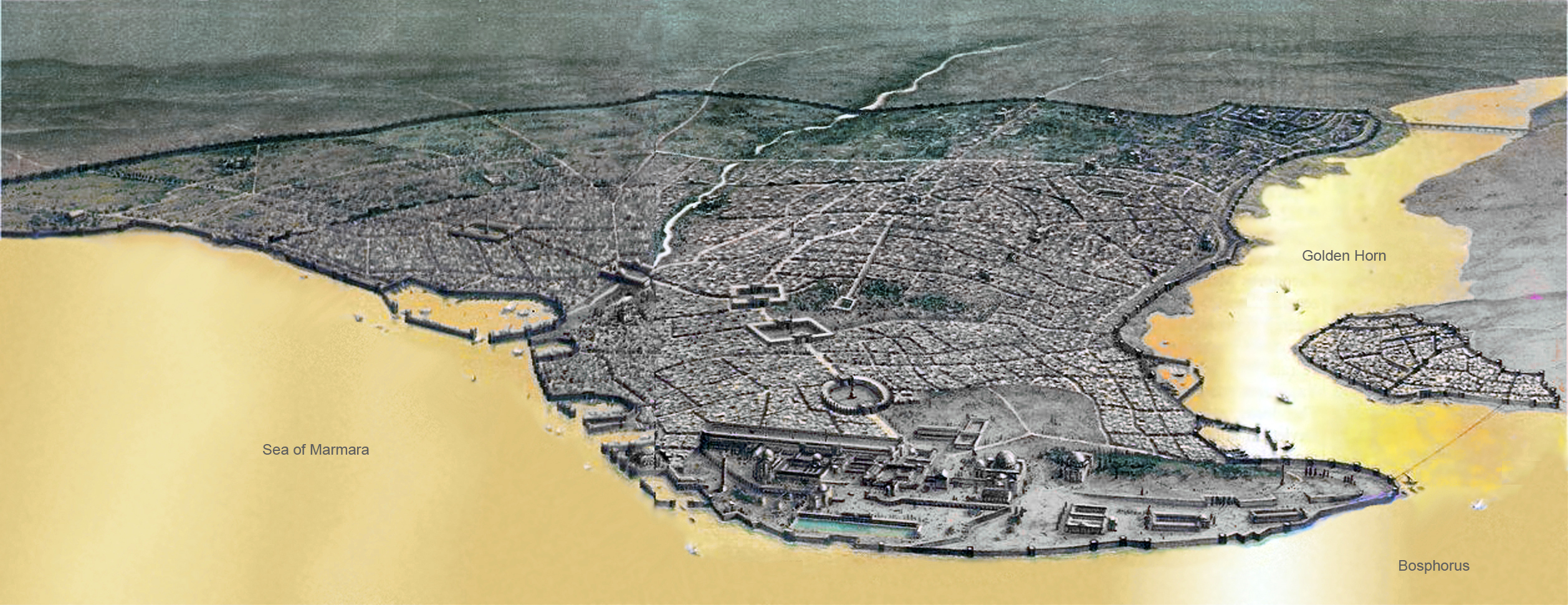
Aerial view of Byzantine Constantinople and the Propontis (Sea of Marmara)

When Tribigild's Goths reached Chalcedon on the opposite side of Constantinople, Gainas managed to convince him to join his coup. With the support of Tribigild, Gainas had a considerable army (mostly Goths) and now seized power. Together they entered Constantinople and expelled Aurelianus, another rival with influence over Arcadius. With the capital in his hands, Gainas had become supreme and had Eutropius executed. Using his power, he also ordered the emperor to renounce the services of Alaric and to cede the province of Pannonia to the West. This administrative change caused Alaric to lose his military rank of general and the right to legal benefits for his men. Gainas hoped to lose a dangerous opponent to the western empire.

=== Revolt of the people in Constantinople ===
Not long afterwards, Gainas lost control of events in the capital. Out of dissatisfaction with his actions and partly at the initiative of the Patriarch of Constantinople John Chrysostom, the people revolted on July 12, 400. The unpopular barbarian garrison fled. Gainas and Tribigild managed to leave Constantinople alive, but several thousand Goths, including many women and children who lived in the city as part of the Eastern Roman military establishment, were massacred.

Arcadius then ordered the Gothic general Fravitta to lead an army against Gainas. In what follows, depicted on the Column of Arcadius, Fravitta defeated Gainas and Tribigild in a naval battle in the Sea of Marmara. The defeated Goths disembarked at Thessalonica and then suffered another defeat in Thrace, in which Tribigild was killed and Gainas managed to flee across the Danube. However, his freedom was short-lived, as he was now in Hun territory. Gainas was captured, then killed by Uldin, who sent his head to Arcadius as a diplomatic gift.

== Aftermath ==
The Anatolian Goths no longer played a significant role after their demise. The Goths who stayed in Pannonia under Alaric, on the other hand, now turned their attention to the west. Due to Gainas's coup, they had been sidetracked and were now excluded from politics in Constantinople. They soon lost all hope of a new agreement with the emperor. To try to break the impasse, Alaric took his people to Italy in the fall of 401 and over the next twelve months attempted to make a deal with Stilicho, the effective commander of the western army. His arrival eventually led to the Gothic War of 402–403.
