= Serenianus =

Roman general

Serenianus (Greek: Σερενιανός; died in Lydia, 366) was an officer of the Roman Empire, involved in the death of Caesar Constantius Gallus and in the usurpation of Procopius.

== Biography ==
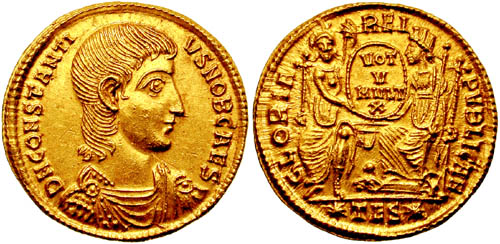
Coin of Constantius Gallus, the caesar that Serenianus executed in Pula.

Serenianus was born in Pannonia. attended at the court of Roman Emperor Constantius II (337-361). It is known that he had been a former general, in charge of the defence of Phoenicia, whose laxity had been the reason for the devastation of the city of Celsein. He was put under trial for treason: he had sent one of his men with an enchanted hat to ask oracles on the Emperor's life. However, even if the charge was demonstrated, he was declared not guilty, thanks to his friends.

In 354 he was sent to Pola, where Caesar Constantius Gallus was under trial for treason, to tell the prisoner that he had been condemned to death; then, together with Apodemius and Pentadius, he executed the Caesar.

In 364, Emperor Valentinian I proclaimed his brother Valens co-emperor. The two rulers divided among themselves the army and the officers. In this occasion, Serenianus, who had been returned to the reserve for long time, entered at Valens' service as comes domesticorum ("commander of the imperial bodyguard").

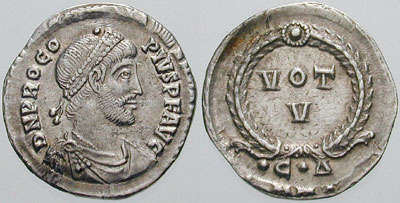
Siliqua of Procopius (365-366). Serenianus was loyal to Emperor Valens and fought against Procopius, but was killed during that war.

In 366 he was killed by Marcellus, protector of usurper Procopius, who, in 365, rebelled against Emperor Valens. The story is told differently by the two sources survived, Ammianus Marcellinus and Zosimus.

According to Ammianus, Serenianus stayed loyal to Valens. That year Serenianus went to Cyzicus, where he found that an imperial officer called Venustus had brought in that city, for fear of the usurper, the money to pay the troops; Serenianus, confident in the city garrison and in the strength of the city walls, fortified Cyzicus. To obtain that money, Procopius collected a strong army and put under siege Cyzicus, capturing the city and Serenianus, who was sent, as a prisoner, to Nicaea. After Procopius was killed, Marcellus, who was in command of the garrison of Nicaea, during the night entered the Palace, where Serenianus was held, and killed him.

According to Zosimus, who follows Eunapius, Serenianus was in Bithynia, leading some cavalry units, and Procopius sent Marcellinus to Bithynia to neutralize this menace. Serenianus occupied Cyzicus, but Marcellinus put under siege and captured the city, pursued the fleeing Serenianus in Lydia and killed him.

Ammianus had a mad opinion of Serenianus, whom he describes rude and cruel, and says that Marcellus' only merit was to have killed Serenianus and saved thus many lives, as Serenianus, once free, would have damaged many people.

== Bibliography ==
=== Primary sources ===
- Ammianus Marcellinus, Res Gestae.
- Zosimus, New History.

=== Secondary sources ===
- Banchich, Thomas, "Marcellus (366 A.D.)", De Imperatoribus Romanis
- Martindale, John R.; Jones, A. H. M.; Morris, John, eds. (1971). The Prosopography of the Later Roman Empire: Volume I, AD 260–395. Cambridge: Cambridge University Press. p. 825. ISBN 0-521-07233-6.
