= 399 =

399 in various calendars
- Gregorian calendar: 399; CCCXCIX
- Ab urbe condita: 1152
- Assyrian calendar: 5149
- Balinese saka calendar: 320–321
- Bengali calendar: −195 – −194
- Berber calendar: 1349
- Buddhist calendar: 943
- Burmese calendar: −239
- Byzantine calendar: 5907–5908
- Chinese calendar: 戊戌年 (Earth Dog); 3096 or 2889 — to — 己亥年 (Earth Pig); 3097 or 2890
- Coptic calendar: 115–116
- Discordian calendar: 1565
- Ethiopian calendar: 391–392
- Hebrew calendar: 4159–4160
- Hindu calendars
- Vikram Samvat: 455–456
- Shaka Samvat: 320–321
- Kali Yuga: 3499–3500
- Holocene calendar: 10399
- Iranian calendar: 223 BP – 222 BP
- Islamic calendar: 230 BH – 229 BH
- Javanese calendar: 282–283
- Julian calendar: 399; CCCXCIX
- Korean calendar: 2732
- Minguo calendar: 1513 before ROC 民前1513年
- Nanakshahi calendar: −1069
- Seleucid era: 710/711 AG
- Thai solar calendar: 941–942
- Tibetan calendar: ས་ཕོ་ཁྱི་ལོ་ (male Earth-Dog); 525 or 144 or −628 — to — ས་མོ་ཕག་ལོ་ (female Earth-Boar); 526 or 145 or −627

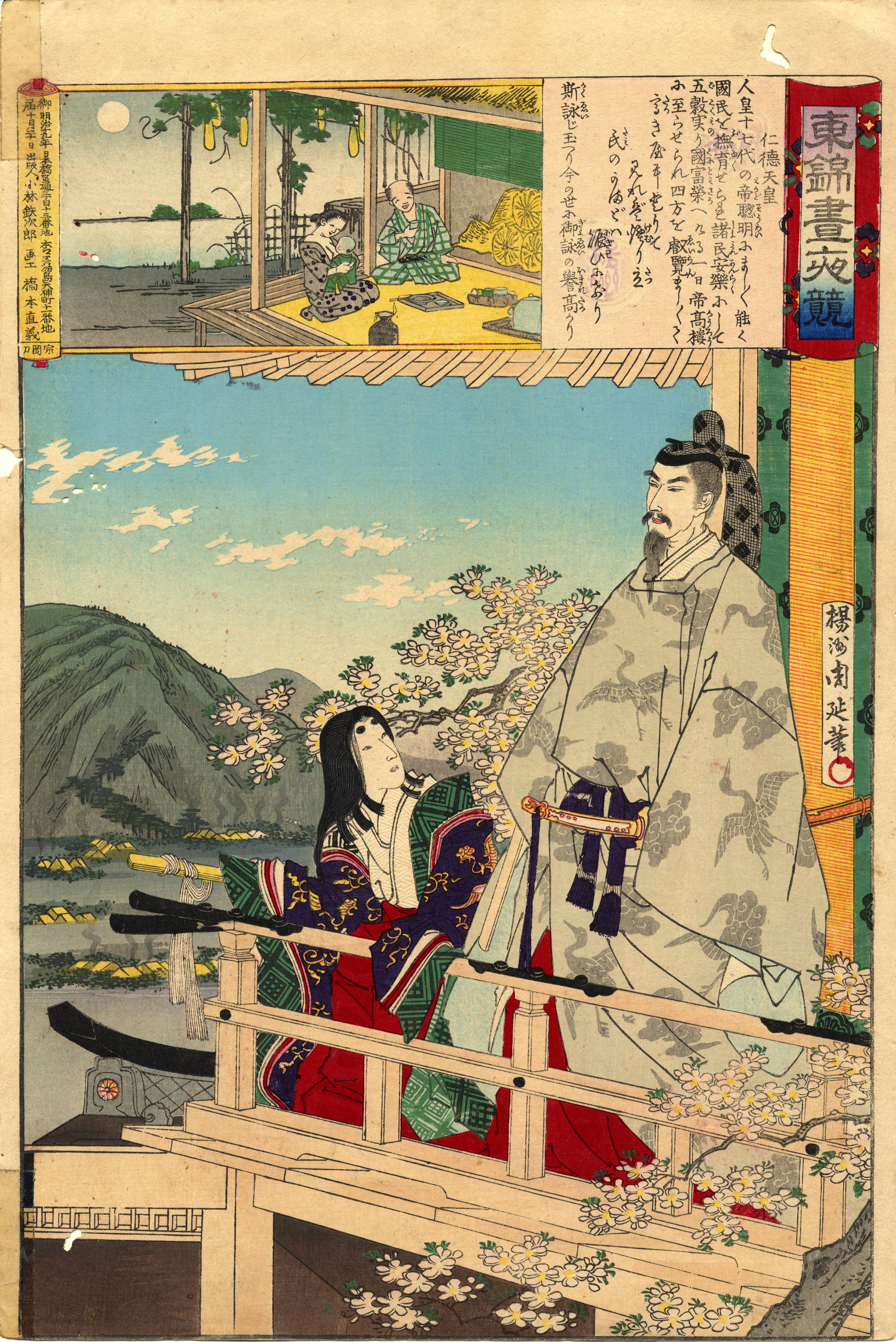
Emperor Nintoku (313–399) (right)

Year 399 (CCCXCIX) was a common year starting on Saturday of the Julian calendar. At the time, it was known in Rome as the Year of the Consulship of Eutropius and Theodorus (or, less frequently, year 1152 Ab urbe condita). The denomination 399 for this year has been used since the early medieval period, when the Anno Domini calendar era became the prevalent method in Europe for naming years.

== Events ==
=== By place ===
==== Roman Empire ====
- The Emperor Honorius of the Western Roman Empire, who is only 15 years old, closes the gladiatorial schools in Rome, and legally ends munera (gladiator games).
- Flavius Mallius Theodorus becomes Roman consul and official at the imperial court of emperor Arcadius.
- Gainas, a Gothic leader, is made magister militum and forms an alliance with deserters of Tribigild along the Bosphorus. He proclaims himself co-regent (usurper), and installs his forces in Constantinople. Gainas deposes anti-Gothic officials and has Eutropius, imperial advisor (cubicularius), executed.

==== Middle East ====
- King Bahram IV dies after an 11-year reign. He is succeeded by Yazdegerd I, who becomes the thirteenth Sassanid Emperor of Persia.

==== Asia ====
- Fa-Hien, Chinese Buddhist monk, travels to India, Sri Lanka and Kapilavastu (modern Nepal).
- Xianbei kingdom of Southern Yan conquers Qing Province (modern central and eastern Shandong) from the Eastern Jin.

=== By topic ===
==== Religion ====
- November 26 – Pope Siricius dies at Rome after a 15-year reign in which he has commanded celibacy for priests, asserted papal authority over the entire Western Church, and threatened to impose sanctions on those who do not follow his dictates.
- Anastasius I succeeds Siricius as the 39th pope. He seeks to reconcile the churches of Rome and Antioch. Anastasius also condemns the doctrine of Origen.
- Flavian I is acknowledged as legitimate bishop of Antioch by the Church of Rome.

== Births ==
- Narsai, Syriac poet and theologian (approximate date)

== Deaths ==
- November 26 – Pope Siricius
- Bahram IV, king of the Sassanid Empire (Persia)
- Eutropius, Roman consul and eunuch
- Evagrius Ponticus, Christian monk and ascetic (b. 345)
- Fabiola, Christian saint
- Nintoku, emperor of Japan
- Tribigild, Ostrogothic general
- Tufa Wugu, prince of the Xianbei state Southern Liang
- Yuan Shansong, official and poet of the Jin Dynasty
