= Equitius (consul) =

Roman army officer

- Born: Pannonia
- Military career
- Allegiance: Roman Empire
- Rank: Magister militum

Equitius, or Aequitius, was magister militum (or master of soldiers) in Illyricum in the Roman Empire.

== Career ==
Born in Pannonia, he served together with the future Emperor Valentinian I as scutarius (or guardsman). Being one of Valentinian's principal supporters, the new Emperor made Equitius magister militum in Illyricum in 364. When Procopius rose up against Valentinian, Equitius remained loyal to the Emperor. Procopius sent envoys to the Illyrian troops to secure their support, but Equitius had them captured and killed. Valentinian appointed Equitius consul in 374. In 375, when Valentinian died, Equitius was one of the generals who elevated the deceased emperor's second son, Valentinian II, as emperor. He was last seen in the region of Illyria in 384.

== Sources ==
- Coombs–Hoar, Adrian (2015). Eagles in the Dust: The Roman Defeat at Adrianopolis AD 378. Pen and Sword. ISBN 978-1-78159-088-1.
- Lenski, Noel (2014). Failure of Empire: Valens and the Roman State in the Fourth Century A.D. University of California Press. ISBN 978-0-520-23332-4.

Preceded by Valentinian (I) Augustus IV; Valens Augustus IV	Roman consul 374 with Gratian Augustus	Succeeded by Valens Augustus V Valentinian (II) Augustus in 376
