= Pentadius =

Pentadius (fl. 354–361) was an officer of the Roman Empire.

== Biography ==
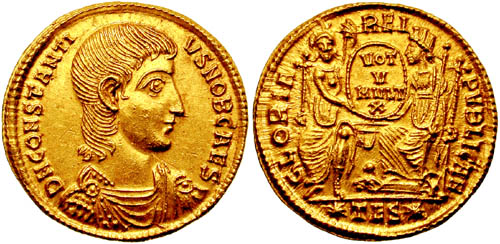
Coin of Constantius Gallus, the caesar that Pentadius executed in Pula.

He was holding the office of notarius when, in 354, Emperor Constantius II ordered him, Eusebius and Mallobaudes to interrogate Constantius Gallus, formerly Caesar of the East and cousin of Constantius II, while he was held prisoner in Pula, asking him reason for each man he had put to death. Gallus was sentenced to death and Serenianus, Apodemius and Pentadius executed him.

In 358 Pentadius was raised to the rank of magister officiorum of the new Caesar of the West Julian, brother of Gallus, whom he followed in Gaul. Pentadius, however, opposed Julian; together with Paulus Catena and Gaudentius he had Salutius, a friend and a collaborator of Julian's, removed from his office. In 360, together with Nebridius and Decentius, he suggested Julian to obey Constantius, who had asked to his caesar to send him back his best troops; when the troops who did not want to leave Gaul for the eastern front acclaimed Julian emperor, Pentadius and Euterius were sent to bring Constantius some letters announcing the events.

In 361, Julian became the only Emperor; after entering Constantinople, he formed the Chalcedon tribunal to put under trial Constantius' officers; Pentadius was accused for his involvement in Gallus' trial and death, but was found not guilty.

== Bibliography ==
=== Primary sources ===
- Ammianus Marcellinus, Res gestae
- Julian, Letter to the Athenians
- Zosimus, New History

=== Secondary sources ===
- Martindale, John R.; Jones, A. H. M.; Morris, John, eds. (1971). The Prosopography of the Later Roman Empire: Volume I, AD 260–395. Cambridge: Cambridge University Press. p. 687. ISBN 0-521-07233-6.
