= Arbitio =

Roman army officer

Flavius Arbitio
- Occupations: Military officer, Consul

Flavius Arbitio (fl. 354–366 AD) was a Roman general and Consul who lived in the middle of the 4th century AD.

== In the reign of Constantius II ==
Arbitio was a general of Constantine I. Under Constantius II, the son and successor of Constantine, he became magister equitum (commander of the cavalry). Arbitio was a well trusted courtier of Constantius, and some modern historians have suggested he was his military strongman. In 355 he was made consul together with Quintus Flavius Maesius Egnatius Lollianus.

Arbitio intrigued against Claudius Silvanus, Ursicinus and Barbatio and played a role in their downfalls. Historian Ammianus Marcellinus says he was "keen and eager in plotting treachery", and describes him as "fickle flatterer" to Constantius II.

== In the reign of Julian ==
After the death of Constantius in 361, Arbitio was appointed chairman of the Chalcedon tribunal by the new Emperor Julian. In this function he was responsible for the conviction of Paulus Catena and many ministers and followers of Constantius. Arbitio did not take part in Julian's Persian expedition, instead retiring to live as a private citizen.

== In the reign of Valens ==
In 365, Procopius, a relative of the deceased emperor Julian, attempted to seize control of the Roman Empire's eastern half from Valens. Arbitio ignored a summons from Procopius, and the usurper, who had been hoping to arrange an alliance, instead confiscated Arbitio's properties. This action led Arbitio to side with Valens, who appointed him "ad hoc magister militum". During the subsequent campaign, Arbitio encountered an old friend, Gomoarius, serving in the opposing army, and convinced him to desert to Valens. Procopius was eventually captured and executed.

What happened to Arbitio after this time is unknown, although it is reasonable to assume that he retired, and subsequently died without taking any further part in matters of state.

== Sources ==
- Ammianus Marcellinus, Loeb Classical Library
- Lenski, N.E., Failure of empire: Valens and the Roman State in the fourth century A.D. (2002)

Political offices
| Preceded by Constantius Augustus VII; Constantius (Gallus) Caesar III | Roman consul 355 with Lollianus Mavortius | Succeeded by Constantius Augustus VIII; Julian Caesar |
