= 400 =

400 in various calendars
- Gregorian calendar: 400; CD
- Ab urbe condita: 1153
- Assyrian calendar: 5150
- Balinese saka calendar: 321–322
- Bengali calendar: −194 – −193
- Berber calendar: 1350
- Buddhist calendar: 944
- Burmese calendar: −238
- Byzantine calendar: 5908–5909
- Chinese calendar: 己亥年 (Earth Pig); 3097 or 2890 — to — 庚子年 (Metal Rat); 3098 or 2891
- Coptic calendar: 116–117
- Discordian calendar: 1566
- Ethiopian calendar: 392–393
- Hebrew calendar: 4160–4161
- Hindu calendars
- Vikram Samvat: 456–457
- Shaka Samvat: 321–322
- Kali Yuga: 3500–3501
- Holocene calendar: 10400
- Iranian calendar: 222 BP – 221 BP
- Islamic calendar: 229 BH – 228 BH
- Javanese calendar: 283–284
- Julian calendar: 400; CD
- Korean calendar: 2733
- Minguo calendar: 1512 before ROC 民前1512年
- Nanakshahi calendar: −1068
- Seleucid era: 711/712 AG
- Thai solar calendar: 942–943
- Tibetan calendar: ས་མོ་ཕག་ལོ་ (female Earth-Boar); 526 or 145 or −627 — to — ལྕགས་ཕོ་བྱི་བ་ལོ་ (male Iron-Rat); 527 or 146 or −626

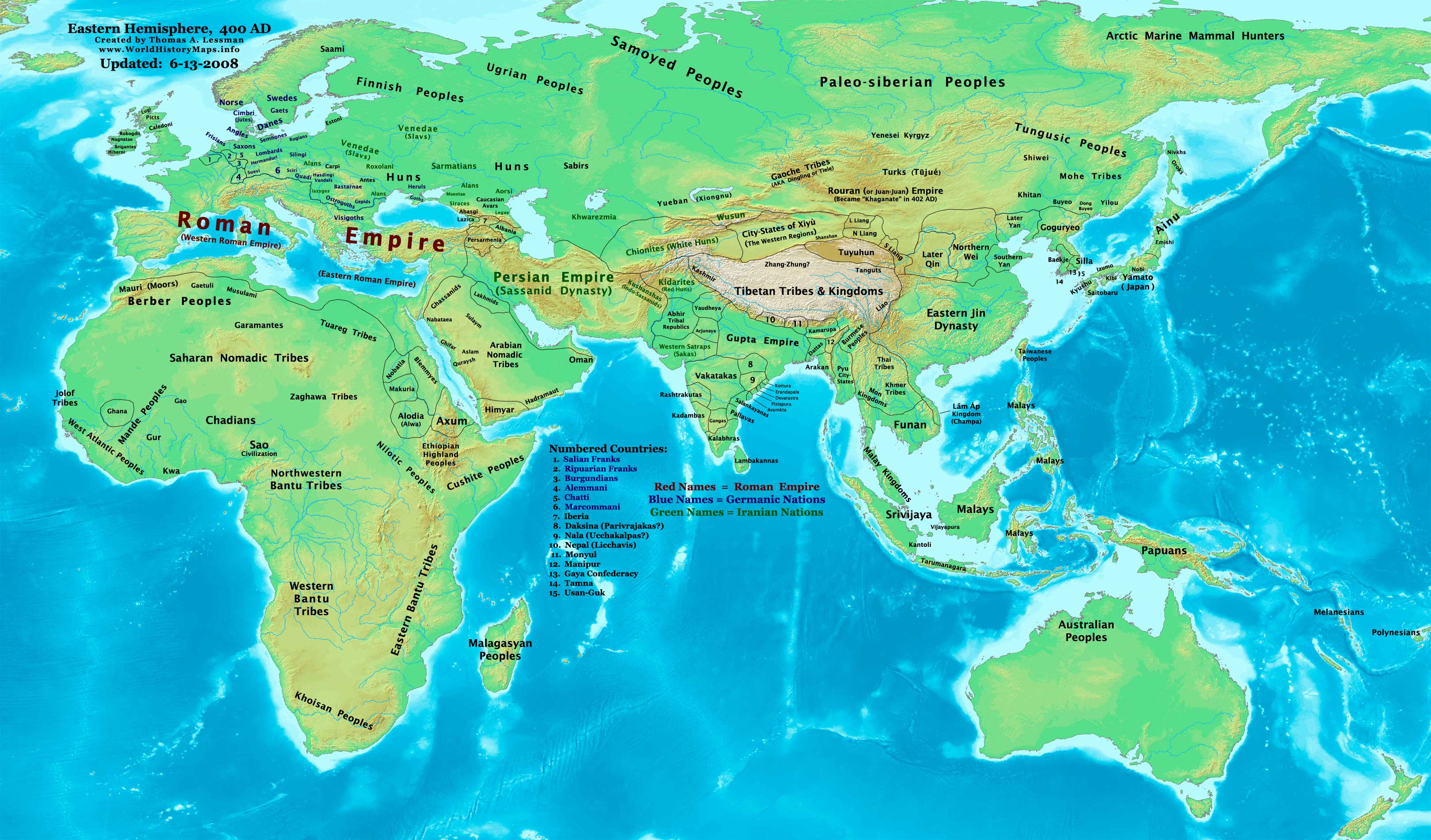
The Eastern Hemisphere in 400

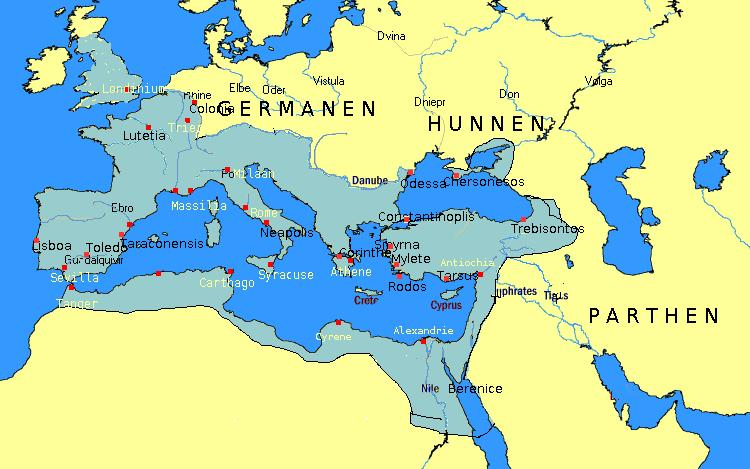
Europe in 400

Year 400 (CD) was a leap year starting on Sunday of the Julian calendar. In the Roman Empire, it was known as the Year of the Consulship of Stilicho and Aurelianus (or, less frequently, year 1153 Ab urbe condita). The denomination 400 for this year has been used since the early medieval period, when the Anno Domini calendar era became the prevalent method in Europe for naming years. It was the 400th year of the Common Era (CE) and Anno Domini (AD) designations, the 400th year of the 1st millennium, the 100th and last year of the 4th century, and the 1st year of the 400s decade.

== Events ==
=== By place ===
==== Roman Empire ====
- January 9 – Emperor Arcadius gives his wife Aelia Eudoxia the official title of Augusta. She is able to wear the purple paludamentum and is depicted in Roman currency.
- Anthemius, praetorian prefect of the East, is sent on an embassy to the Persian capital, Ctesiphon, to congratulate King Yazdegerd I on his accession the year before.
- A riot breaks out in Constantinople; the Great Palace is burned to the ground. Gainas, a Gothic leader, attempts to evacuate his soldiers out of the city, but 7,000 armed Goths are trapped and killed by order of Arcadius. After the massacre, Gainas tries to escape across the Hellespont, but his rag-tag ad hoc fleet is destroyed by Fravitta, a Gothic chieftain in imperial service.
- Winter – Gainas leads the remaining Goths back to their homeland across the Danube. They meet the Huns and are defeated; the Hunnic chieftain Uldin sends the head of Gainas to Constantinople, where Arcadius receives it as a diplomatic gift.

==== Europe ====
- The Paeonians (Illyricum) lose their identity (approximate date).

==== Asia ====
- Richū, the eldest son of Nintoku, becomes the 17th Emperor of Japan.

=== By topic ===
==== Art ====
- Resurrection and "Two Marys with Angel near the Empty Tomb", panel of a diptych, found in Rome, is made. It is now kept at Castello Sforzesco, Milan (approximate date).

==== Literature ====
- The Vergilius Vaticanus, an illuminated manuscript containing fragments of Virgil's Aeneid and Georgics, is made in Rome.
- The Yoga Sutras of Patanjali are composed.

==== Medicine ====
- Caelius Aurelianus, Roman physician, is practising his work "De morbis acutis et chronicis" (Concerning Acute and Chronic Illness), a guide to acute and chronic diseases.

==== Physics ====
- Hypatia, Greek philosopher, distinguishes herself as one of the first female scientists and becomes head of the Neo-Platonist school at Alexandria.

==== Religion ====
- The mausoleum of Galerius in Salonica (Greece) is converted into a church.
- Bishops from Gaza (Palaestina Prima) arrive at Constantinople to ask Arcadius that he close the pagan temple of Marnas.

== Births ==
- Aspar, Alan patrician and general (magister militum) (approximate date)
- Bahram V, Sasanian King of Kings (shahanshah)
- Hassan Yuha'min, king of the Himyarite Kingdom
- Hydatius, bishop of Aquae Flaviae (modern Chaves, Portugal) (approximate date)
- Pope Leo I, Bishop of Rome
- Qusayy ibn Kilab, Ishmaelite descendant of Abraham
- Salvian, Christian writer (approximate date)
- Sozomen, Christian Church historian

== Deaths ==
- Castor of Karden, Christian priest and hermit
- Duan, Chinese empress and wife of Murong Bao
- Gainas, Gothic chieftain and general (magister militum)
- Li Lingrong, empress and mother of Jin Xiaowudi
- Lü Guang, emperor of the Di state Later Liang (b. 337)
- Lü Shao, "Heavenly Prince" (Tian Wang) of Later Liang
- Oribasius, Greek medical writer and physician
