= Sidimund =

Sidimund was a 5th-century Ostrogothic warrior. Under the Ostrogothic king Valamir, Sidimund had been plundering Epirus. He was a member of the Amali dynasty and a close relative of Aidoingus, the comes domesticorum. Sidimund later served in the Eastern Roman army with great distinction, and acquired extensive land holdings in the area near Durazzo. He was considered a friend of the Romans and was held in great esteem. In 479, Sidimund helped his relative Theodoric the Great settle in Epirus, despite the opposition of another fellow Goth, Gento.

== Sources ==
- Wolfram, Herwig (1990). History of the Goths. University of California Press. ISBN 0520069838.
