= Gento (Goth) =

Gothic Warrior

Gento was a 5th-century Gothic warrior in Eastern Roman service. He was married to a Roman woman from Epirus, and the commander of a unit of Roman troops. In 479, when Theodoric the Great attempted to settle the Ostrogoths in Epirus with the help of his relative Sidimund, Gento and the Eastern Roman general Sabinianus were tasked with preventing it.

== See also ==
- Fravitta

== Sources ==
- Wolfram, Herwig (1990). History of the Goths. University of California Press. ISBN 0520069838.
