= Apodemius =

Courtier in the Roman Empire

Apodemius (died 361) was an officer of the Roman Empire, a courtier of Emperor Constantius II, involved in the deaths of Constantius Gallus and Claudius Silvanus.

== Biography ==
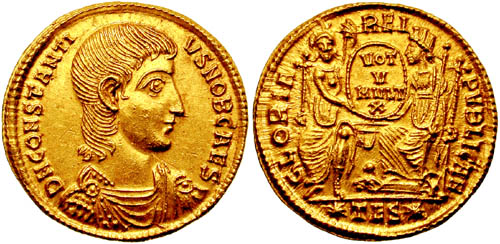
Coin of Constantius Gallus, the caesar that Apodemius executed in Pula.

Apodemius was an agens in rebus, a sort of secret agent, who worked for emperor Constantius II (337–361).

In 354, Constantius ordered Apodemius and Barbatio to go to Poetovio, arrest his cousin and caesar of the East Constantius Gallus and bring him to Pula, where trial awaited him. When Constantius ordered Gallus to be put to death for treason, Apodemius, Serenianus and the notarius Pentadius executed the sentence; immediately after, Apodemius grabbed Gallus' shoes, rode quickly from Pula to Mediolanum, where the imperial court was seated, entered the chamber where Constantius was having a meeting and threw the shoes at the feet of the Emperor to signify Gallus' death.

When the magister militum Claudius Silvanus rebelled in Gaul, in 355, Apodemius was sent with letters to summon Silvanus to the presence of Constantius. Contemporary historian Ammianus Marcellinus tells:

For by the counsels of Arbetio, Apodemius, who was a persevering and bitter enemy to all good men, was sent with letters to summon Silvanus to the presence. When he had arrived in Gaul, taking no heed of the commission with which he was charged, and caring but little for anything that might happen, he remained inactive, without either seeing Silvanus, or delivering the letters which commanded him to appear at court. And having taken the receiver of the province into his counsels, he began with arrogance and malevolence to harass the clients and servants of the master of the horse, as if that officer had been already condemned and was on the point of being executed.

In 361 Constantius II died; his successor was Julian, half-brother of Constantius Gallus. The new emperor instituted the Chalcedon tribunal to bring to trial the officers of Constantius II, in particular their involvement in Gallus' fall and death. Apodemius, who by the time had already returned to private life, was found guilty of having plotted against Gallus and put to death.

Contemporary historian Ammianus Marcellinus, who throughout his Roman History criticizes the courtiers of Constantius for their bad influence on the Emperor and for their numberless plots, has a bad opinion of Apodemius, of whom he says that "as long as he lived had been a fiery instigator of disturbances" and that "was a persevering and bitter enemy to all good men".

== Bibliography ==
- Ammianus Marcellinus, Res gestae
- Martindale, John R., ed. (1980). "Apodemius 1". The Prosopography of the Later Roman Empire: Volume II, AD 395–527. Cambridge: Cambridge University Press. p. 82. ISBN 0-521-20159-4.
