= Gomoarius =

Soldier

Gomoarius (Latin: Gomoarius, Gumoarius; Greek: Γομοαρίος) was an Alemannic warrior who served in the Roman army.

In 350 AD, under the usurper Vetranio, Gomoarius was a tribunus notariorum scutariorum. In 359 AD, he was raised by Constantius II to the title magister armorum. Two years later he was removed from office by emperor Julian. In 365, he served under Agilo, the magister militum under the usurper Procopius. Gomoarius later defected from Procopius to the rightful emperor Valens, helping the latter to his victory at the Battle of Thyatira in 366 AD.
