= Aidoingus =

5th-century Byzantine warrior

Aidoingus was a 5th-century Ostrogothic warrior. He was a member of the Amali dynasty, and an uncle of Sidimund. Aidoingus joined the Eastern Roman army, rising to the position of comes domesticorum.

== Sources ==
- Wolfram, Herwig (1990). History of the Goths. University of California Press. ISBN 0520069838.
