= Battle of Thyatira =

Battle over the Roman imperial succession

- Part of Procopius' Rebellion
Date	366
Location	Thyatira, Lydia (modern-day Akhisar, Manisa, Turkey) 38.9208°N 27.8361°E
Result	Valens victory

Belligerents
Roman Empire	Procopius

Commanders and leaders
Valens	Gomoarius

The Battle of Thyatira was fought in 366 at Thyatira, Lydia (modern Turkey), between the army of the Roman Emperor Valens and the army of the usurper Procopius, led by his general Gomoarius.

== Background ==
After the death of the emperor Julian in his campaign against Persia in 363, his distant relative Procopius was the last surviving descendant of Constantine I. This link to the revered Constantinian dynasty made Procopius dangerous as a potential usurper, but the emperor Jovian allowed him to retire peacefully to his estates in Cappadocia. Jovian's successor Valens was less trusting, and tried to have Procopius killed. Procopius escaped from the imperial executioners and spent an interval hiding in the Tauric Chersonese. In 365, while Valens was absent from Constantinople, Procopius emerged from exile, seizing control of the capital city and the adjoining provinces of Thrace and Bithynia. His Constantinian heritage, and promises of money, won a strong force of imperial soldiers to his cause.

== Battle ==
Valens reacted to the usurpation with despair, and the situation was saved by his generals, Salutius, Arintheus and Arbitio. An army intended for campaigns in the east was redirected against Procopius, who confronted it at Thyatira. Valens's officers spoke to the rebellious soldiers, many of whom they had commanded in prior wars, and encouraged them to rejoin the legitimate emperor. Procopius lost the battle after a large part of his army defected to Valens; a subsequent action at Nacolia ended in a similar manner, and Procopius was captured and killed.
