= Eriulf =

Eriulf (died 391) was a Gothic warlord. He was a leader of the Thervingi, who under emperor Theodosius I had been settled as foederati along the lower Danube through a treaty concluded in 382. Eriulf led one of the factions among the Goths who crossed the Danube in 376 while the other followed Fravitta. These two leaders struggled to fill the leadership vacuum among the Thervingi that had existed since 382.

== Death ==
In the year 391, some of the Thervingi rebelled against Roman rule. Eriulf was the leader of these rebels, and was opposed by Fravitta, who remained loyal to the Romans. He was murdered by the latter in 391 at a banquet with Theodosius. As a consequence, Fravitta had to flee Gothic society with his Roman wife and joined the East Roman army, where he was given a command in the regular army.

== Sources ==
- Arnold Hugh Martin Jones, John R. Martindale, John Morris: The Prosopography of the Later Roman Empire. Band 1: A. D. 260 – 395. Cambridge University Press, Cambridge 1971, S. 372 f.
- Herwig Wolfram: Die Goten. Von den Anfängen bis zur Mitte des sechsten Jahrhunderts. Entwurf einer historischen Ethnographie. 4. Auflage. Beck, München 2001, ISBN 3-406-33733-3.
