= Aphrahat (hermit) =

Hermit of Persian origin (280–345)

- Born: 4th century Sassanian Empire
- Died: 407-413; Antioch, Coele Syria, Eastern Roman Empire
- Feast: April 7

Aphrahat, Aphraat, Aphraates or Afrates (Ancient Greek: Aφραάτηςi; Persian: فرهاد; and Classical Syriac: ܐܦܪܗܛ) was a fourth-century Persian-born hermit who was active in Mesopotamia and Syria during the reign of Emperor Valens (r. 365–378) and perhaps Theodosius (r. 378–395). His life is known only from the account of Theodoret, who was reportedly taken as a boy to visit the hermit in Antioch and was blessed by him.

Aphraates was a native of the Sassanian Empire, but after converting to Christianity, he decided to go to Edessa. There he would become a hermit and live a life of penance and contemplation of heaven. Years later, he moved to a hermitage near Antioch, where he would be visited by many people seeking advice. He was visited by an ambassador named Anthemius, perhaps the future Praetorian prefect of the East and Roman consul of the same name, and came into conflict with Valens for his persecution of the Orthodox.

== Life ==
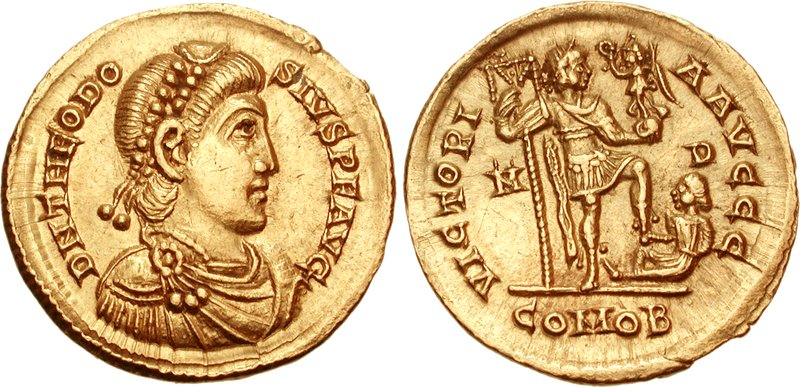
Theodosius' solidus (r. 378–395).

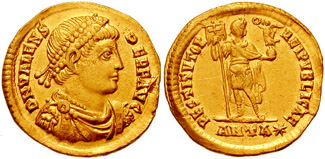
Valens' solidus (r. 365–378).

Aphrahat belonged to a Persian family native to the Sassanian Empire. After converting to Christianity, he settled in Edessa, Mesopotamia, to decide how best to serve God. There, he decided to follow a life of seclusion and moved to a cell outside the city walls, where he devoted himself to penance and the contemplation of heaven. His diet consisted of bread, to which he added vegetables when he was old, which he ate after sunset, and his bed was a mat on the floor. His clothing consisted of a coarse garment.

After some time, Aphrahat moved his residence to a hermitage next to a monastery near Antioch in Syria, where people gradually began to seek his advice. One of the individuals to visit him was Anthemius, who had returned from an embassy to the Sassanian Empire and brought with him a garment produced in the hermit's homeland. Aphrahat is alleged to have asked whether it was reasonable to exchange a trusted old servant for a new one merely because he was a fellow countryman. Anthemius is alleged to have replied, "Certainly not," and Aphrahat retorted, "Then take back your tunic, for I have one that I have worn for 16 years, and I need no more than one."

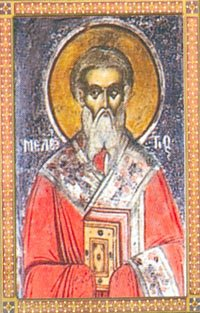
Icon of St. Meletius.

It is not certain when the meeting of Anthemius and Aphrahat took place. The authors of the PLRE, in associating the diplomat with the namesake Praetorian prefect of the East and consul, have dated the event to 383, when Anthemius was returning from an embassy to Persia sent by the emperor Theodosius alongside another official, the barbarian Stilicho. The Encyclopædia Iranica, on the other hand, makes no mention of this diplomat being the Theodosius' officer and dates the episode between 375 and 378, when negotiations were in progress to end the ongoing war between Emperor Valens and Shapur II (r. 309–379). The editors of "Butler's Lives of the Saints" agree with PLRE on the association of the characters, but do not give a dating.

During the reign of Valens, who was an Arian, there was great persecution of those who followed the Nicene Creed. In the 370s, when the emperor settled with his army in Antioch for his war against the Persians, the patriarch Meletius was banished and the Arians carried out a severe persecution of the orthodox. Due to the disturbances caused by the imperial actions, Aphrahat headed to Antioch, where he assisted Flavian and Diodorus who had been entrusted with the government of the Catholics during Meletius' exile. Because he had a great reputation stemming from his holiness and miracles, his actions and words carried weight.

Due to the capture of the local churches by the Arians, the Orthodox were forced to hold their services beside the Orontes River or in the large open space outside the city in which military exercises were held. On one day, hurrying along the road leading to the training camp, Aphrahat was stopped on orders by Valens, who was standing on the portico of his palace. The emperor asked him where he was going, and Aphrahat reportedly replied, "to pray for the world and the emperor". The monarch then questioned him why, being dressed as a monk, he was wandering away from his cell.

To this, Aphrahat answered with a parable: "If I were a damsel withdrawn from my father's house, and I saw it on fire, would you advise me to sit back and let it burn? It is not I who should be blamed, but you who lit the flames that I am struggling to extinguish. We are doing nothing contrary to our profession when we put together and nurture the adherents of the true faith." The emperor did not retort, but one of his servants reviled Aphraates, who was threatened with death. Shortly thereafter, the same individual was accidentally scalded to death, causing terror in Valente who refused to listen to the Arians who pressured him to banish Aphrahat. He was also impressed by the miracles of the hermit, who not only healed men and women, but also his favorite horse.

== See also ==
- Arianism
- Nicene creed
- Theodosius
- Valens
- Sassanian Empire
- Antioch

== Bibliography ==
- Martindale, J. R.; Jones, Arnold Hugh Martin; Morris, John (1980). The Prosopography of the Later Roman Empire. Vol. 2. A. D. 395 - 527. Cambridge University Press. ISBN 978-1-107-11930-7.
- Thurston, Herbert J.; Attwater, Donald (1990). Butler's Lives of the Saints. Westminster, Marilândia: Christian Classics.
