= Tribigild =

4th-century Ostrogothic general

Tribigild, also called Tarbigilus (Latin: Tribigildus; Ancient Greek: Τριβιγίλδος; fl. 399) was an Ostrogothic general whose rebellion against the Eastern Roman Empire precipitated a major political crisis during the reign of Emperor Arcadius.

Tribigild appears in the historical record as the leader of a colony of Greuthungi mercenary cavalrymen in Nakoleia, Phrygia and as a military confederate of the Roman state, holding the rank of comes. This group of Goths and Greuthungi that had settled in Phrygia were mostly remnants of the group of Goths which had been under the command of Odotheus before he was defeated in battle. Tribigild was given command of this group, and the rank of comes, due to a victory against the Huns in 386. In 399, considering his honor insulted by an insufficiently extravagant reception at the imperial court in Constantinople, he revolted against Arcadius. Tribigild marched his armies to sack the interior of Asia Minor, including regions and settlements such as Pamphylia and Pisidia. His army was ambushed and destroyed by a local militia, with the few survivors and Tribigild escaping by bribing a Roman officer to let them escape. When the imperial legions arrived, he was easily able to subvert the loyalty of the fellow Goths that were the fighting core of the force, and scatter the rest.

The resulting population upheavals and rumors of Tribigild's increasing power forced Arcadius's prime minister, the eunuch Eutropius, to send an expeditionary force led by the general Gainas across the Hellespont. According to the writer Claudian in his work In Eutropium, another general named Leo was dispatched to fight Tribigild. This general fought under bad omens, with weak and undisciplined men. During the battle, his cavalry and infantry got in the way of each other, and Tribigild captured them in an ambush. Gainas, who was of the same tribe as Tribigild, and may have been a kinsmen, possibly saw potential in using the mutiny to depose Eutropius. He returned to report that the rebel was insurmountable and that negotiation would be the safest tactic. A demand for the lifeblood of Eutropius, perhaps negotiated in advance by Gainas and Tribigild, was met. Since Aelia Eudoxia, the wife of Arcadius, was already opposed to Eutropius, Arcadius was motivated to agree to the demands, and removed Eutropius from power.

Praetorian Prefect Flavius Aurelianus replaced Eutropius and became consul for the year 400. Gainas, enraged as he had not been rewarded, marched on Chalcedon, and demanded to be given the position of magister militum and the deposition of Aurelianus as compensation. Both of these wishes were granted; however, Gainas lacked major influence over the court, as he had very few political connections and had made enemies of Emperor Arcadius and Empress Eudoxia. Gainas openly allied with Tribigild, and together they marched across the Bosporus on Constantinople. Tribigild was killed while fighting in Thrace, while Gainas survived and occupied Constantinople. His time in Constantinople proved disastrous, the citizenry organized a pogrom that killed many of his men. Gainas and his army were then defeated in battle by the general Flavius Fravitta. Gainas escaped across the Danube and was killed by the Hunnic leader Uldin.

== See also ==
- Gothic Revolt of Tribigild

== Sources ==
- A. Richard Diebold Center for Indo-European Language and Culture
- Noel Lenski, review of Wolfgang Hagl's Arcadius Apis Imperator: Synesios von Kyrene und sein Beitrag zum Herrscherideal der Spätantike, Bryn Mawr Classical Review, 98.3.08
- "Biography of John Chrysostom". Smith's Greek and Roman Biography and Mythology. Archived from the original on May 29, 2006.
- Gibbon's Decline and Fall of the Roman Empire, vol. 3
- Arcadius page at romanemperors.org
