= Marcellus (usurper) =

Roman officer and usurper (4th c.)

Marcellus (Greek: Μάρκελλος; died 366) was an officer of the Roman Empire, supporter of usurper Procopius and briefly an usurper himself.

There are two versions of the history of his usurpation, the first told by Ammianus Marcellinus, a contemporary historian, the second exposed by Zosimus, a historian of the beginning of the 6th century.

== Ammianus Marcellinus' version ==
Ammianus Marcellinus underlines the fact that Marcellus was a relative of Procopius (a member of the Constantinian dynasty). In 365 Procopius rebelled against emperor Valens, taking the purple; Marcellus became his protector and was entrusted with the defence of Nicaea. When, in 366, Procopius was killed, Marcellus killed Serenianus, a cruel general of Valens' who had been captured by Procopius at Cyzicus, and then conquered Chalcedon.

Procopius had based his usurpation on his bond with the Constantinian dynasty and on the support of some barbaric peoples; Marcellus tried to exploit his own bond to Procopius and to consolidate an alliance with Gothic tribes. He proclaimed himself emperor, but his rule was short. Valens' magister militum, Equitius, learned of Procopius' death and attacked Marcellus, capturing him. After a few days, Marcellus and some of his supporters were put to death.

== Zosimus' version ==
According to Zosimus, Marcellus was sent by Procopius from Constantinople into Bithynia, to counter the cavalry unit under Serenianus' command and loyal to Valens. Serenianus occupied Cyzicus, but Marcellus put the city under siege and took it, forcing Serenianus to flee; after a short pursuit in Lydia, Marcellus killed him.

After Procopius' death, Valens captured Marcellus. According to Zosimus and John of Antioch, Marcellus was suspected of planning a usurpation, as he had been found with the regalia of Procopius; thus Valens ordered his death and that of his family and his supporters.

== Bibliography ==
=== Primary sources ===
- Ammianus Marcellinus, Res Gestae, xxvi.10.1—5.
- John of Antioch, fr. 184.2
- Zosimus, New History, iv.6.3—5, iv.8.3—4.

=== Secondary sources ===
- Banchich, Thomas, "Marcellus (366 A.D.)", De Imperatoribus Romanis
- Martindale, John R.; Jones, A. H. M.; Morris, John, eds. (1971). The Prosopography of the Later Roman Empire: Volume I, AD 260–395. Cambridge: Cambridge University Press. p. 551. ISBN 0-521-07233-6.
