= Nakoleia =

Ancient and medieval city in Phrygia

Coordinates: 39°26′44″N 30°41′38″E

Nakoleia (Greek: Νακώλεια and Νακόλεια) also known as Nakolaion (Νακώλαιον), Latinized as Nacolia or Nacolea, was an ancient and medieval city in Phrygia. It corresponds to present-day Seyitgazi, Eskişehir Province in the Central Anatolia region of Turkey.

== Name ==
According to tradition, it was named after the nymph Nacole (Νακώλη and Νακόλη).

Stephanus of Byzantium also records an alternative tradition that the city may have been named after Nacolos (Νάκολος), the son of Daskylos.

== History ==
A map of Byzantine Anatolia with Nakoleia located in the Opsician Theme

It was a town of Phrygia Salutaris. The area was known for its fertility in late Roman times, thanks to the river Parthenios (Seyit Su), and was wooded in the late 4th century (it is now deforested). It was there that Valens defeated the usurper Procopius in 366 AD (see Battle of Thyatira); under Arcadius it was occupied by a garrison of Goths under Tribigild who revolted against the emperor in 399 AD. As many towns in the region, the town venerated especially the archangel Michael and at least one church is attested to him in the town.

During the Byzantine-Arab wars in the 8th century, the town became a frequent target for Arab raids and was besieged several times. In 782, the town was temporarily captured by the Abbasid Caliphate in 782. Pantoleon the Deacon relates a story in the Miracula S. Michaelis in which attacking Arabs are forced to abandon their siege of the town by the intervention of the archangel after offending him by shooting with a catapult at his church.

The armies of the First Crusade most likely passed by this town in 1097. The town was permanently conquered by the Seljuk Turks in the late 12th century who called it Kala'-i-Mashihya, the Christian Castle.

== Bishopric ==
At first a suffragan of Synnada, the see of Nakoleia became important in the early 8th century, when its bishop Constantine became one of the leading proponents of Byzantine Iconoclasm under Leo III the Isaurian (ruled 717–741) and was later condemned as an heresiarch at the Second Council of Nicaea (787). Nakoleia was elevated to the rank of an archbishopric between 787 and 862, and eventually to a metropolitan see between 1035 and 1066, when its incumbent appears in the last place among the metropolitans attending a council. The see continued in existence as a metropolis, without suffragans, until the 14th century. Nakoleia is included, with archiepiscopal rank, in the Catholic Church's list of titular sees and has been left without titular bishops since 1973.
