= Decentius (magister officiorum) =

Decentius (fl. 360–365) was an officer of the Roman Empire; he played a role in the acclamation of Julian as emperor against Constantius II in Paris (360).

== Biography ==
In 360 he was tribunus et notarius. Emperor Constantius II sent Decentius to Caesar Julian to ask for his best troops, the Heruli, the Batavi, the Celtae and the Petulantes, as well as three hundred picked men from other corps. The troops were not happy with this order, as they did not want to leave their country and their families to go East, but Decentius took some of the most vigorous men and started marching. He also suggested Julian to have the troops pass through Paris, where the Caesar had his quarters. This is an important detail, as when in Paris, the troops acclaimed Julian emperor against Constantius. He then returned to Constantius.

Between 364 and 365 he hold the office of magister officiorum, having a great influence in the court.

== Bibliography ==
=== Primary sources ===
- Ammianus Marcellinus, Res gestae.
- Julian, Letter to the Athenians.
- Libanius, Orationes and Epistulae

=== Secondary sources ===
- Martindale, John R.; Jones, A. H. M.; Morris, John, eds. (1971). "Decentius 1". The Prosopography of the Later Roman Empire: Volume I, AD 260–395. Cambridge: Cambridge University Press. p. 244. ISBN 0-521-07233-6.
