= Valens =

Roman emperor from 364 to 378

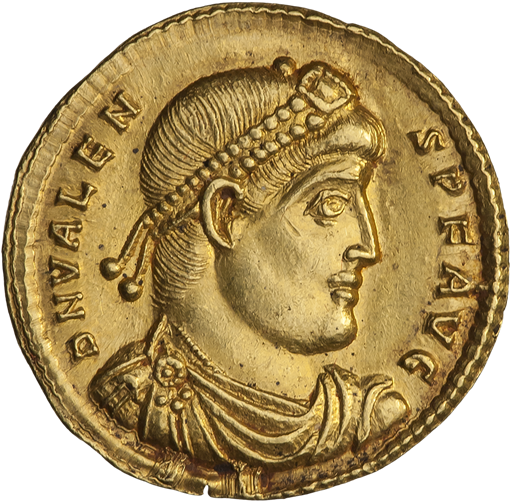
- Solidus of Valens, marked: d·n· valens p·f· aug·

Roman emperor in the East
- Reign: 28 March 364 – 9 August 378
- Predecessor: Valentinian I (alone)
- Successor: Theodosius I
- Co-rulers: Valentinian I (West, 364–75); Gratian (West, 375–78); Valentinian II (West, 375–78)
- Rival emperor: Procopius
- Born: 328; Cibalae, Pannonia Secunda (present-day Vinkovci)
- Died: 9 August 378 (aged 49/50); Adrianople, Eastern Roman Empire (now Edirne)
- Spouse: Domnica
- Issue: Anastasia; Carosa; Valentinianus Galates
Regnal name
- Imperator Caesar Flavius Valens Augustus (Note: From the fourth century onwards, emperors and other high-profile men bore the name "Flavius", the nomen adopted by the Constantinian dynasty. It was used only as a status marker, but it's still often included as part of late emperors' names.) (Note: His full name is sometimes given as "Flavius Julius Valens". This name is only attested in one inscription from the L'Année Épigraphique, which also refers to Valentinian as "Flavius Julius Valentinianus". The PLRE mentions this in Valens's entry, but not in Theodosius'.)
- Dynasty: Valentinianic
- Father: Gratianus Funarius
- Religion: Semi-Arianism

Valens (Note: Sometimes enumerated as Valens II, after Valerius Valens (r. 316–317).) (/ˈveɪlənz/; Latin: Valens; 328 – 9 August 378) was Roman emperor from 364 to 378. Following a largely unremarkable military career, he was named co-emperor by his elder brother Valentinian I, who gave him the eastern half of the Roman Empire to rule. In 378, Valens was defeated and killed at the Battle of Adrianople against the invading Goths, which astonished contemporaries and marked the beginning of barbarian encroachment into Roman territory.

As emperor, Valens continually faced threats both internal and external. He defeated, after some dithering, the usurper Procopius in 366, and campaigned against the Goths across the Danube in 367 and 369. In the following years, Valens focused on the eastern frontier, where he faced the perennial threat of Persia, particularly in Armenia, as well as additional conflicts with the Saracens and Isaurians. Domestically, he inaugurated the Aqueduct of Valens in Constantinople, which was longer than all the aqueducts of Rome. In 376–77, the Gothic War broke out, following a mismanaged attempt to settle the Goths in the Balkans. Valens returned from the east to fight the Goths in person, but lack of coordination with his nephew, the western emperor Gratian (Valentinian I's son), as well as poor battle tactics, led to Valens and much of the eastern Roman army dying in a battle near Adrianople in 378.

A capable administrator who significantly relieved the burden of taxation on the population, Valens is also described as indecisive, impressionable, a mediocre general and overall "utterly undistinguished". His suspicious and fearful disposition resulted in numerous treason trials and executions which heavily stained his reputation. In religious matters, Valens favored a compromise between Nicene Christianity and the various non-trinitarian Christian sects, and interfered little in the affairs of the pagans.

== Early life and military career ==
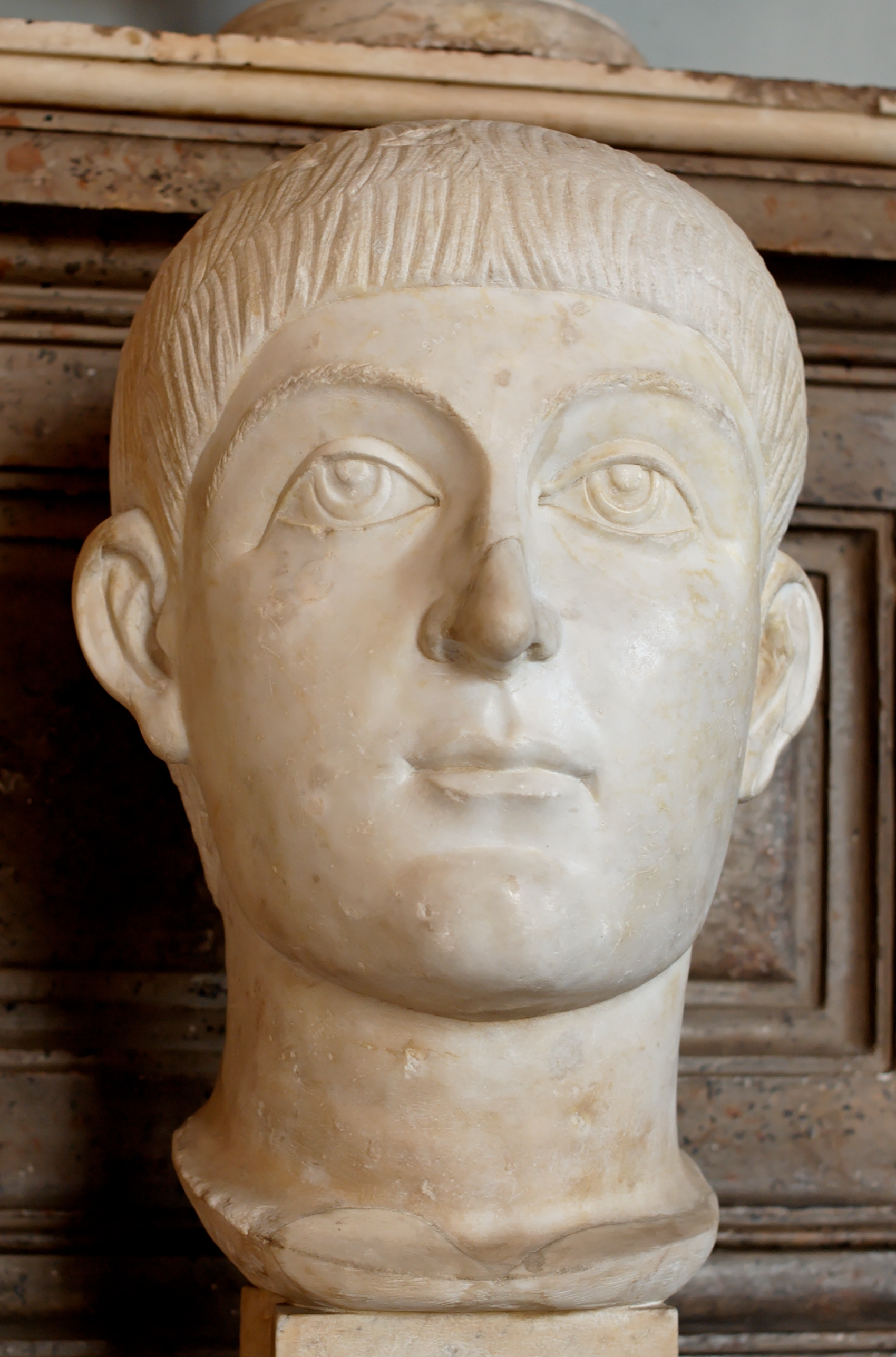
Marble bust possibly representing Valens or Honorius (Capitoline Museums)

Valens and his brother Valentinian were born, in 328 and 321 respectively, to an Illyrian family resident in Cibalae (Vinkovci) in Pannonia Secunda. Their father Gratianus Funarius, a native of Cibalae, had served as a senior officer in the Roman army and as comes Africae. The brothers grew up on estates purchased by Gratianus in Africa and Britain. Both were Christians, but favored different sects: Valentinian was a Nicene Christian and Valens was an Arian Christian (specifically a Homoean). In adulthood, Valens served in the protectores domestici under the emperors Julian and Jovian. According to the 5th-century Greek historian Socrates Scholasticus, Valens refused pressure to offer pagan sacrifices during the reign of the polytheist emperor Julian.

Julian was killed in battle against the Persians in June 363, and his successor Jovian died the following February while travelling home to Constantinople. The Latin historian Ammianus Marcellinus relates that Valentinian was summoned to Nicaea by a council of military and civil officials, who acclaimed him augustus on 25 February 364.

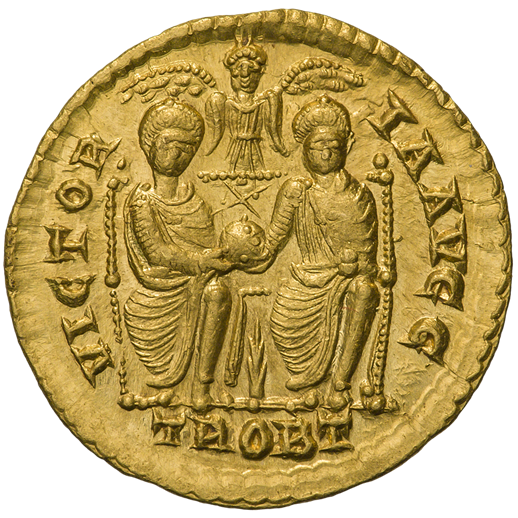
Solidus of Valens showing Valentinian and Valens on the reverse, marked: victoria augg· ("the Victory of Our Augusti"). They hold together the orb, a symbol of power.

Valentinian appointed his brother Valens tribunus stabulorum (or stabuli) on 1 March 364. It was the general opinion that Valentinian needed help to handle the administration, civil and military, of the large and unwieldy empire, and, on 28 March, at the express demand of the soldiers for a second augustus, he selected Valens as co-emperor at the Hebdomon, before the Constantinian Walls.

== Reign ==
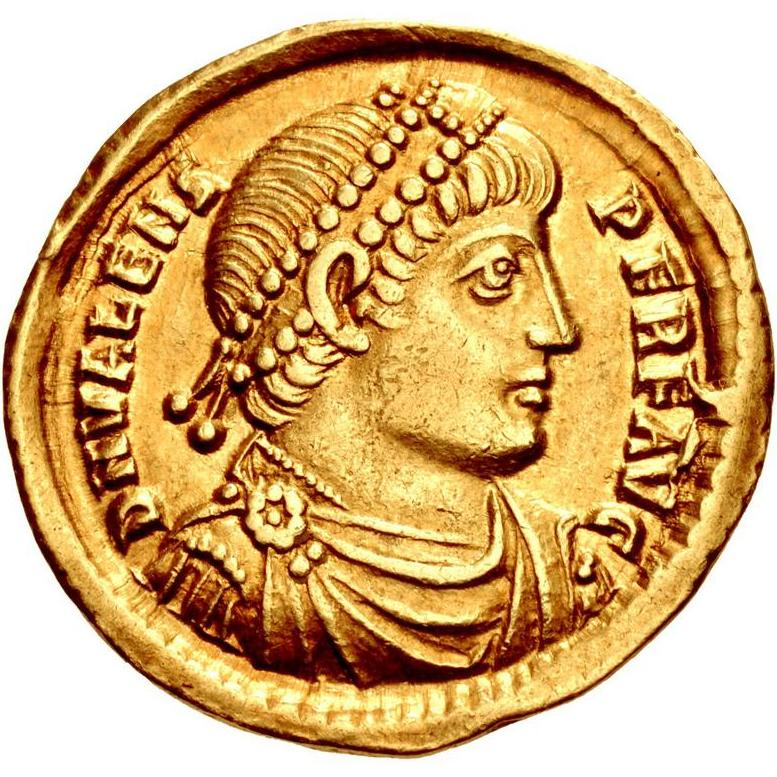
A solidus of Valens with a pearl diadem and a roseate fibula

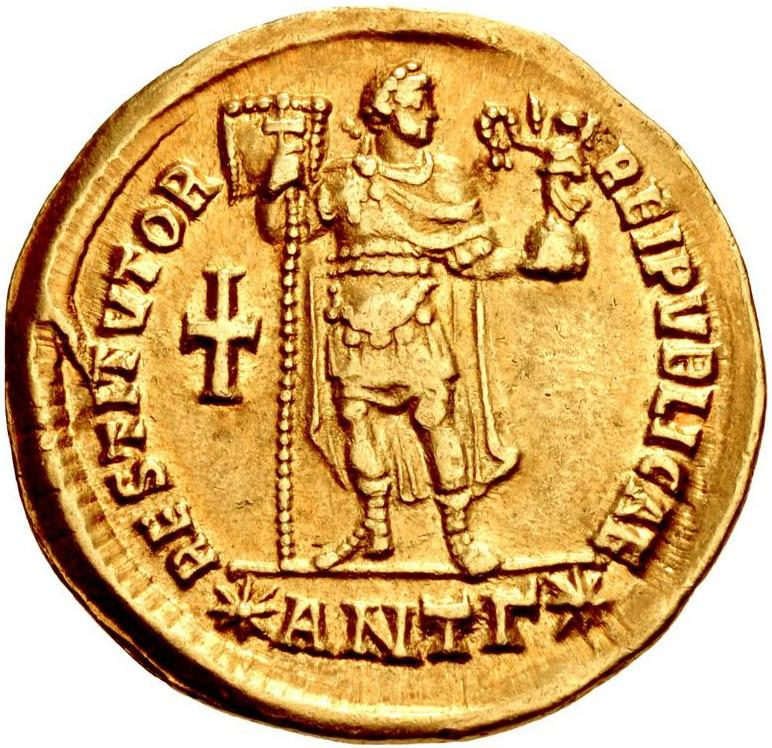
Reverse of a solidus of Valens, marked: restitutor reipublicae ("the restitutor of the Republic") and showing the emperor holding a vexillum and a globe supporting a Victory, who crowns him with a laurel wreath

Both emperors were briefly ill, delaying them in Constantinople. As soon as they recovered, the two augusti travelled together through Adrianople and Naissus to Mediana, where they divided their territories. Valens obtained the eastern half of the Empire: Greece, the Balkans, Egypt, Anatolia and the Levant as far as the border with the Sasanian Empire. Valentinian took the western half, where the Alemannic wars required his immediate attention. The brothers began their consulships in their respective capitals, Constantinople and Mediolanum (Milan).

In the summer of 365, the 365 Crete earthquake and ensuing tsunami caused much destruction in and around the Eastern Mediterranean.

The empire had recently retreated from most of its holdings in Mesopotamia and Armenia because of a treaty that Jovian had made with Shapur II of the Sasanian Empire. Valens' first priority after the winter of 365 was to move east in hopes of shoring up the situation.

=== Usurpation of Procopius (365–366) ===
Recent tax increases, and Valens' dismissal of Julian's popular minister Salutius, contributed to a general disaffection and to the acceptability of a revolution. With the emperor absent from the imperial city, Procopius, a maternal cousin of Julian, declared himself augustus on 28 September 365. Procopius had held office under Constantius II and Julian and was rumoured to have been Julian's intended successor, despite how he had died without naming one. Jovian, aside from depriving him of his command, took no measures against this potential rival, but Valentinian regarded Procopius with hostility. Procopius met the danger from the new emperors with his own bid for power, emphasizing his connection to the revered Constantinian Dynasty: during his public appearances he was always accompanied by Constantia, the posthumous daughter of Constantius II, and her mother Faustina, the dowager empress.

News of the revolt reached Valens at Caesarea (Kayseri) in Cappadocia, after most of his troops had already crossed the Cilician Gates into Syria. His first reaction was despair, and he considered abdication and perhaps even suicide. Procopius quickly gained control of the provinces of Asia and Bithynia, winning increasing support for his insurrection. Valens recovered his nerve and sent an army to Constantinople; according to Ammianus Marcellinus, the soldiers defected to Procopius, whose use of his Constantinian hostages had met with some success.

Having reappointed Salutius, Valens dispatched more troops under veteran generals, Arinthaeus and Arbitio, to march on Procopius. According to Ammianus Marcellinus and the later Greek historians Socrates Scholasticus and Sozomen, the forces of Valens eventually prevailed after eight months, defeating Procopius in battles at Thyatira and Nacoleia. On both occasions, Procopius was deserted by his own following in fear of their adversaries' formidable commanders. Put on trial by members of his own escort, Procopius was executed on 27 May 366. Ammianus Marcellinus relates that Procopius' relative Marcellus was proclaimed emperor in his place, but according to Zosimus he was swiftly captured and executed. Valens could turn his attention back to external enemies, the Sasanian Empire and the Goths.

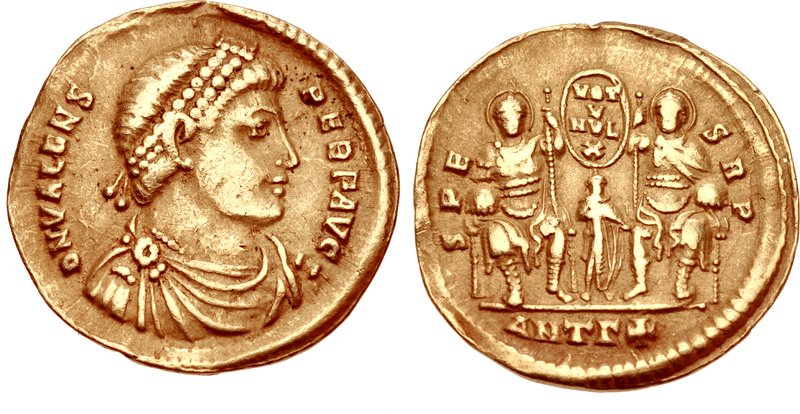
Coin of Valens after his quinquennalia on 25 February 369, showing the three reigning emperors on the reverse marked: spes r p ("the hope of the Republic")

=== First Gothic War: 367–369 ===
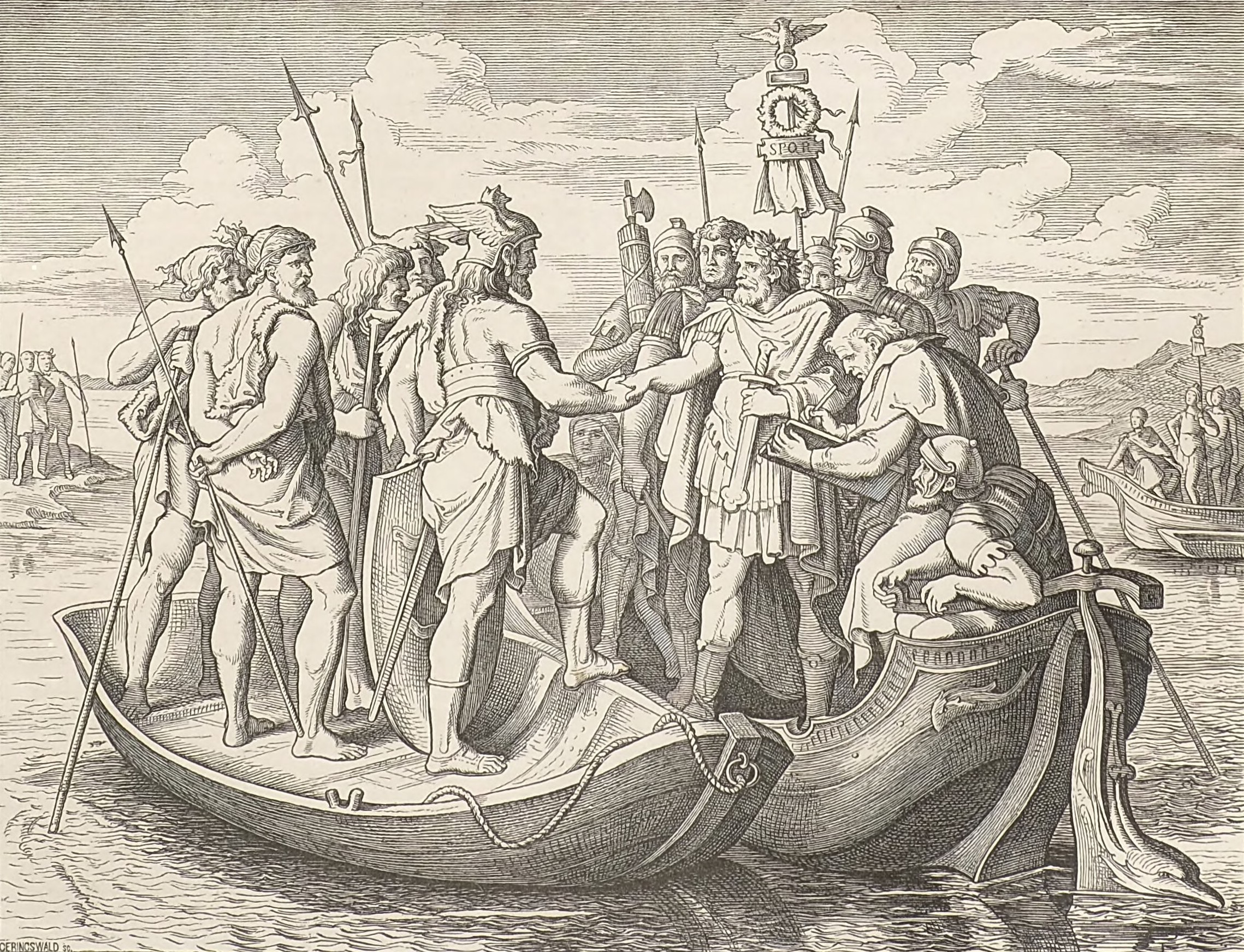
Athanaric and Valens on the Danube, Eduard Bendemann, 1860

During Procopius' insurrection, the Gothic king Ermanaric, who ruled a powerful kingdom north of the Danube from the Euxine to the Baltic Sea, had engaged to supply him with troops for the struggle against Valens. The Gothic army, reportedly numbering 30,000 men, arrived too late to help Procopius, but nonetheless invaded Thrace and began plundering the farms and vineyards of the province. Valens, marching north after defeating Procopius, surrounded them with a superior force and forced them to surrender. Ermanaric protested, and when Valens, encouraged by Valentinian, refused to make atonement to the Goths for his conduct, war was declared.

In spring 367, Valens crossed the Danube and attacked the Visigoths under Athanaric, Ermanaric's tributary. The Goths fled into the Carpathian Mountains, and the campaign ended with no decisive conclusion. The following spring, a Danube flood prevented Valens from crossing; instead, the Emperor occupied his troops with the construction of fortifications. In 369, Valens crossed again, from Noviodunum, and by devastating the country forced Athanaric into giving battle. Valens was victorious and took the title Gothicus Maximus in time for the celebration of his quinquennalia. Athanaric and his forces were able to withdraw in good order and pleaded for peace.

Fortunately for the Goths, Valens expected a new war with the Sasanid Empire in the Middle East and was therefore willing to come to terms. In early 370, Valens and Athanaric met in the middle of the Danube and agreed to a treaty that ended the war. The treaty seems to have largely cut off relations between Goths and Romans, confining trade and the exchange of troops for tribute.

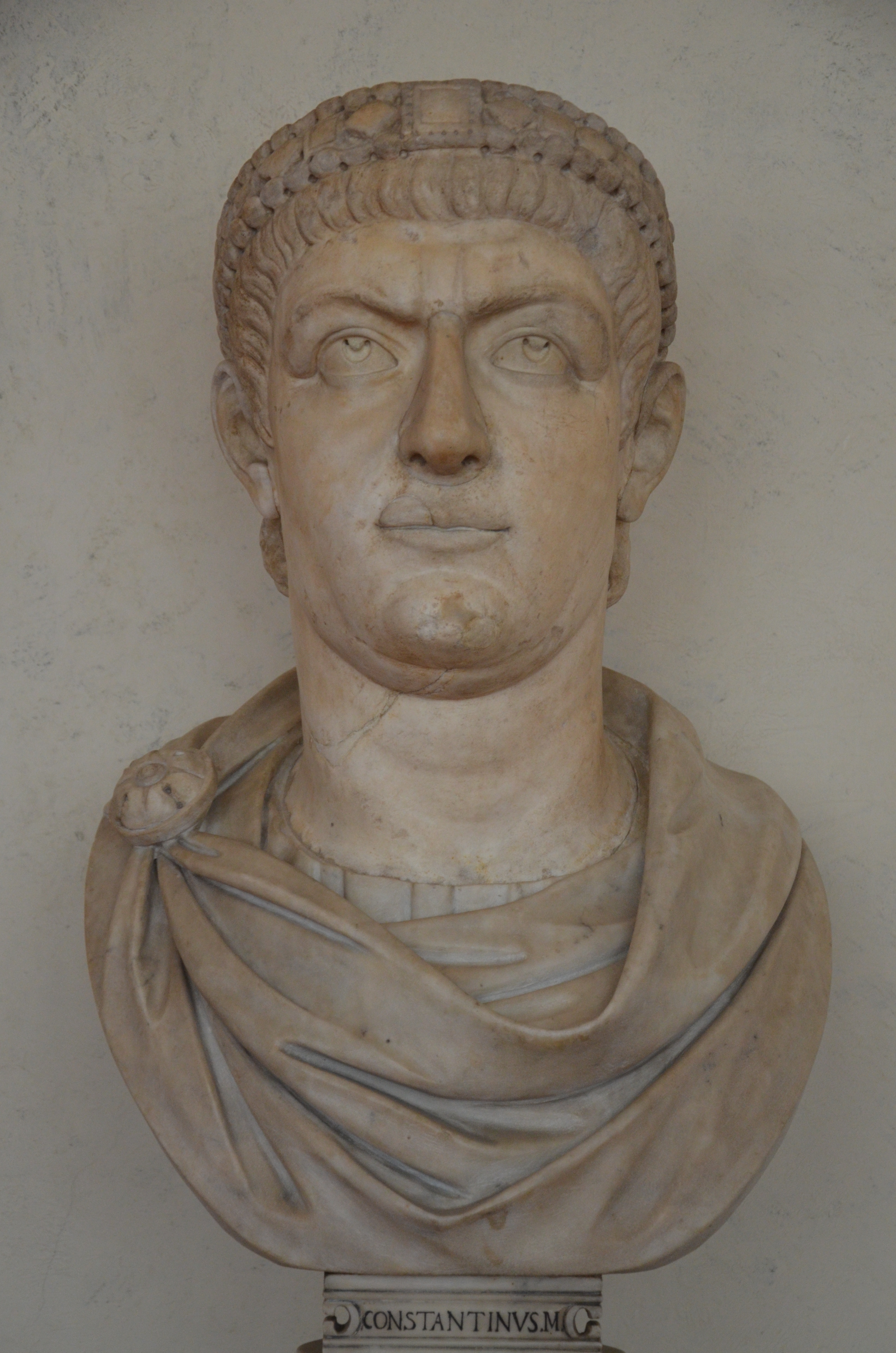
Portrait head of Valens, or his brother, on a modern bust historically mislabelled as Constantine (Uffizi)

=== Persian War: 373 ===
As mentioned before, among Valens' reasons for contracting a hasty and not entirely favourable peace in 369 was the deteriorating state of affairs in the East. Jovian had surrendered Rome's much disputed claim to control over Armenia in 363, and Shapur II was eager to make good on this new opportunity. The Persian emperor began enticing Armenian lords over to his camp and eventually forced the defection of the Arsacid Armenian king, Arshak II (Arsaces II), whom he quickly arrested and incarcerated. The Armenian nobility responded by asking Valens to return Arshak's son, Pap. Valens agreed and sent Pap back to Armenia, but as these events took place during the war with the Goths he could not support him militarily.

In response to the return of Pap, Shapur personally led an invasion force to seize control of Armenia. Pap and his followers took refuge in the mountains while Artaxata, the Armenian capital, and the city of Artogerassa along with several strongholds and castles were destroyed. Shapur sent a second invasion force to Caucasian Iberia to drive out the pro-Roman king Sauromaces II, and put his own appointee, Sauromaces's uncle Aspacures II, on the throne.

In the summer following his Gothic settlement, Valens sent his magister peditum (Master of Foot) Arinthaeus to support Pap. The following spring, twelve legions were sent under Terentius to regain Iberia and to garrison Armenia near Mount Npat. When Shapur counterattacked into Armenia in 371, his forces were bested by Valens' generals Traianus and Vadomarius and the Armenian sparapet (general) Mushegh Mamikonian at Bagavan and Gandzak. Valens had overstepped the 363 treaty and then successfully defended its transgression. A truce settled after the 371 victory held as a quasi-peace for the next five years while Shapur was forced to deal with a Kushan invasion on his eastern frontier.

Meanwhile, troubles broke out with the boy-king Pap, who purportedly had the Armenian patriarch Nerses assassinated and demanded control of a number of Roman cities, including Edessa. Controversy also ensued over the issue of the appointment of a new patriarch of Armenia, with Pap appointing a candidate without the traditional approval from Caesarea. Pressed by his generals and fearing that Pap would defect to the Persians, Valens made an unsuccessful attempt to capture the prince and later had him executed inside Armenia. In his stead, Valens imposed another Arsacid, Varazdat, who ruled under the regency of the sparapet Mushegh Mamikonian, a friend of Rome.

None of this sat well with the Persians, who began agitating again for compliance with the 363 treaty. As the eastern frontier heated up in 375, Valens began preparations for a major expedition. Meanwhile, trouble was brewing elsewhere. In Isauria, the mountainous region of western Cilicia, a major revolt had broken out in 375, which diverted troops formerly stationed in the East. Furthermore, by 377, the Saracens under Queen Mavia had broken into revolt and devastated a swath of territory stretching from Phoenicia and Palestine, as far as the Egypt . Though Valens successfully brought both uprisings under control, the opportunities for action on the eastern frontier were limited by these engagements closer to home.

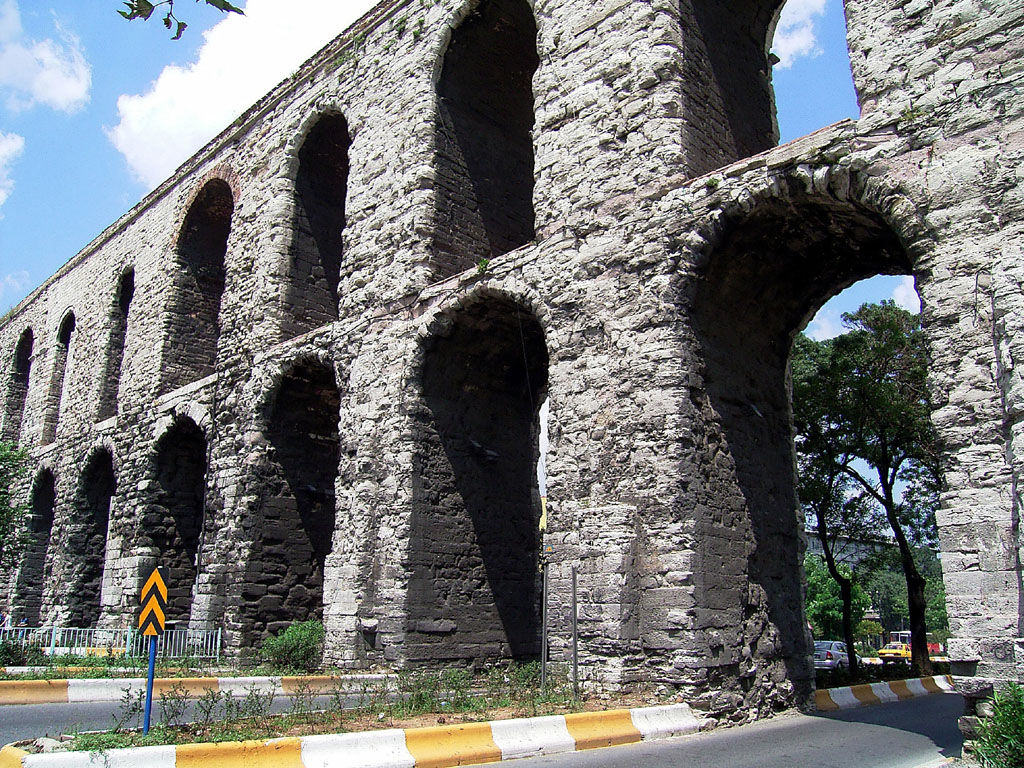
Aqueduct of Valens in Constantinople, capital of the eastern Roman Empire

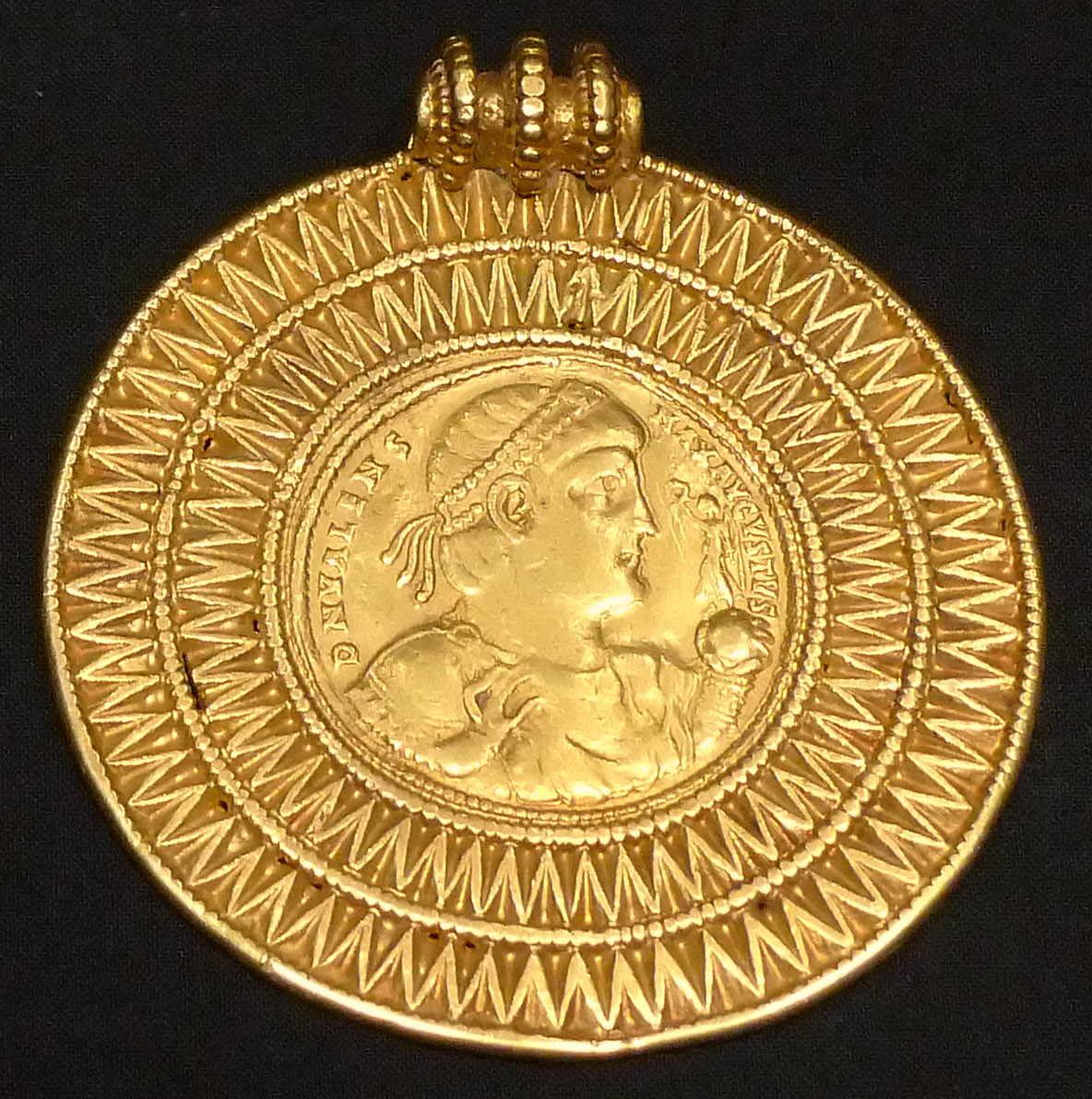
Obverse of a medal of Valens, set in a later pendant and found in the Șimleu Silvaniei, a hoard from the second quarter of the 5th century (Kunsthistorisches Museum)

=== Later reign: 373–376 ===
Valens became the senior augustus on 17 November 375, after his older brother Valentinian died suddenly at Brigetio (Szőny) while on campaign against the Quadi in Pannonia. In the west, Valentinian was succeeded by his elder son Gratian, co-emperor since 367, and his younger son Valentinian II, whom the army on the Danube proclaimed augustus without consulting Gratian or Valens.

=== Second Gothic War: 376–378 ===
Valens' eastern campaign required an ambitious recruitment program, designed to fill gaps left in his mobile forces when troops were transferred to the Western Empire in 374. Meanwhile, migrations of the Huns began to displace the Goths, who sought Roman protection. Refugees from the former kingdom of Ermanaric, unable to hold the Dniester or Prut rivers against Hunnic invaders, retreated southward in a massive emigration, seeking more defensible lands on the Roman side of the Danube. In 376, the Visigoths under their leader Fritigern advanced to the far shores of the lower Danube and sent requests for asylum to Valens in Antioch.

Valens granted permission for a Danube crossing to Fritigern and his followers, who had allied with the Romans in the 370s against Athanaric's persecution of Gothic Christians, and, it was hoped, could now be hired to bolster the eastern army. The Gothic troops would have to be paid in gold or silver, but their presence would decrease Valens' dependence on conscription from the provinces—thereby increasing revenues from the recruitment tax. Though several Gothic groups apparently requested entry, Valens granted admission only to Fritigern's people. Others would soon follow, however.

Valens' mobile forces were tied down on the Persian frontier, where the emperor was attempting to withdraw from the harsh terms imposed by Shapur and was meeting some resistance on the latter's part. This meant that only limitanei units were present to oversee the arrival of Fritigern and his Goths, to the number of 200,000 warriors and almost a million all told. The sparse imperial troops could not stop subsequent Danube crossings by groups of Ostrogoths, Huns, and Alans, none of whom had been included in the original treaty. The controlled resettlement foreseen by the government threatened to turn into a major invasion, and the situation was worsened by corruption in the local Roman administration. Valens' generals accepted bribes rather than depriving the Goths of their weapons as Valens had stipulated, then enraged the settlers by imposing exorbitant prices for food. In early 377, the Goths revolted after a commotion with the people of Marcianopolis, and defeated the corrupt Roman governor Lupicinus near the city at the Battle of Marcianople.

After joining forces with the Ostrogoths under Alatheus and Saphrax who had crossed without Valens' consent, the combined barbarian group spread out to devastate the country before combining to meet Roman advance forces under Traianus and Richomeres. In a sanguinary battle at Ad Salices, the Goths were momentarily checked, and Saturninus, now Valens' lieutenant in the province, undertook a strategy of hemming them in between the lower Danube and the Euxine, hoping to starve them into surrender. However, Fritigern forced him to retreat by inviting some of the Huns to cross the river in the rear of Saturninus' ranged defences. The Romans then fell back, incapable of containing the irruption, though with an elite force of his best soldiers the general Sebastian was able to fall upon and destroy several of the smaller predatory bands.

Valens requested assistance in Thrace from his nephew and co-emperor Gratian, but ultimately took the offensive before Gratian could join him. Leaving behind a skeletal force—some of them Goths—the eastern army withdrew from the frontier, reaching Constantinople by 30 May, 378. The imperial councillors, comes Richomeres, the generals Frigeridus and Victor, and letters from Gratian all cautioned Valens to wait for the arrival of the western army, but the populace of Constantinople became impatient at the delay. Public opinion criticised Valens for failing to control the Goths after inviting them into his territory, and compared him unfavourably with Gratian as a military commander. Valens decided to advance at once and win a victory on his own.

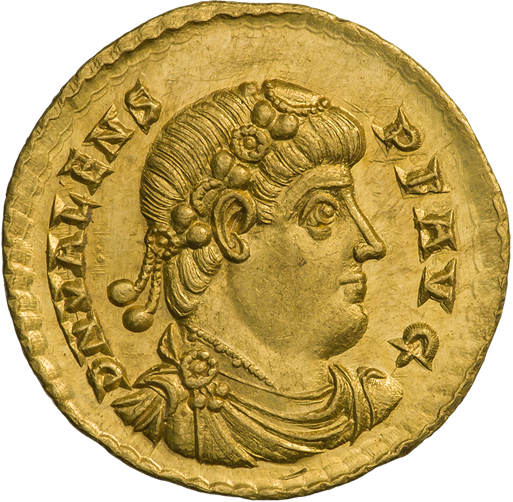
Solidus of Valens

=== Battle of Adrianople ===
According to the Latin historians Ammianus Marcellinus and Paulus Orosius, on 9 August 378, Valens and most of his army were killed fighting the Goths near Hadrianopolis in Thrace (Adrianople, Edirne). Ammianus is the primary source for the battle.

Valens opened the campaign with arrangements aimed at building his troop strength and gaining a toehold in Thrace, then moved out to Adrianople, from whence he marched against the confederated barbarian army. Although negotiations were attempted, these broke down when a Roman unit sallied forth and carried both sides into battle. Valens had left a sizeable guard with his baggage and treasures, depleting his force. His right cavalry wing arrived at the Gothic camp sometime before the left wing arrived. It was a very hot day, and the Roman cavalry was engaged without strategic support, wasting its efforts and suffering in the heat.

Meanwhile, Fritigern once again sent an emissary of peace in his continued manipulation of the situation. The resultant delay meant that the Romans present on the field began to succumb to the heat. The army's resources were further diminished when an ill-timed attack by the Roman archers made it necessary to recall Valens' emissary, comes Richomeres. The archers were beaten and retreated in humiliation. Returning from foraging to find the battle in full swing, Gothic cavalry under the command of Alatheus and Saphrax now struck and, in what was probably the most decisive event of the battle, the Roman cavalry fled.

From here, Ammianus gives two accounts of Valens' demise. In the first account, Ammianus states that Valens was "mortally wounded by an arrow, and presently breathed his last breath" (XXXI.12). His body was never found or given a proper burial. In the second account, Ammianus states the Roman infantry was abandoned, surrounded and cut to pieces. Valens was wounded and carried to a small wooden hut. He died when the Goths, evidently unaware of the prize within, set the hut on fire (XXXI.13.14–16).

A third, apocryphal, account states that Valens was struck in the face by a Gothic dart and then perished while leading a charge. He wore no helmet in order to encourage his men. This action turned the tide of the battle, which resulted in a tactical victory but a strategic loss. The church historian Socrates likewise gives two accounts for the death of Valens.

Some have asserted that he was burnt to death in a village whither he had retired, which the barbarians assaulted and set on fire. But others affirm that having put off his imperial robe he ran into the midst of the main body of infantry; and that when the cavalry revolted and refused to engage, the infantry were surrounded by the barbarians, and completely destroyed in a body. Among these it is said the Emperor fell, but could not be distinguished, in consequence of his not having on his imperial habit.

When the battle was over, two-thirds of the eastern army lay dead. Many of their best officers had also perished. What was left of the army of Valens was led from the field under the cover of night by comes Richomeres and general Victor.

J. B. Bury, a noted historian of the period, provides a specific interpretation on the significance of the battle: it was "a disaster and disgrace that need not have occurred."

For Rome, the battle incapacitated the government. Emperor Gratian, nineteen years old, was unable to deal with the catastrophe until he appointed Theodosius I. The total defeat cost the administration important precious metal resources, as bullion had been centralised with the imperial court. Valens was deified by consecratio as Latin: Divus Valens, lit. 'the Divine Valens'.

== Assessment and legacy ==
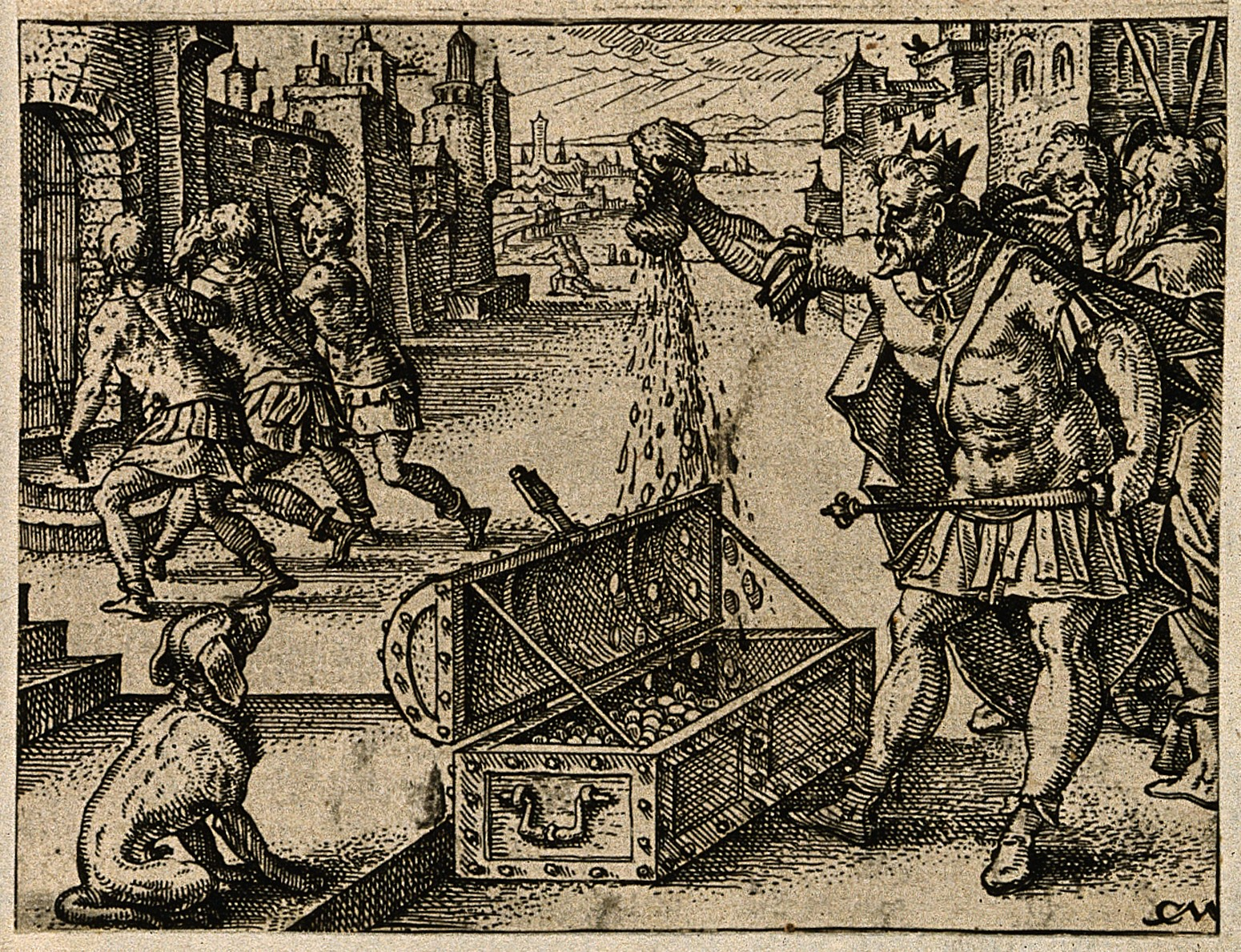
The Roman emperor Valens pours money into a coffer, etching by C. Murer after himself, c. 1600–1614.

"Valens was utterly undistinguished, still only a protector, and possessed no military ability: he betrayed his consciousness of inferiority by his nervous suspicion of plots and savage punishment of alleged traitors," writes A. H. M. Jones, a modern historian. But Jones admits that "he was a conscientious administrator, careful of the interests of the humble. Like his brother, he was an earnest Christian." According to Edward Gibbon (c. 1776–1789), Valens diminished the oppressive burden of the taxes which had been instituted by Constantine and his sons, and was humbly deferential to Valentinian's edicts of reform, as with the institution of Defensors (a sort of substitute for the ancient Tribunes, guardians of the lower classes). Gibbon continues that his moderation and chastity in his private life were everywhere celebrated. At the same time, continuous proscriptions and executions, originating in his weak and fearful disposition, disgraced the dozen years of his reign. "An anxious regard to his personal safety was the ruling principle of the administration of Valens", writes Gibbon. To have died in so inglorious a battle has thus come to be regarded as the nadir of an unfortunate career. This is especially true because of the profound consequences of Valens' defeat. Adrianople spelt the beginning of the end for Roman territorial integrity in the late Empire, and this fact was recognised even by contemporaries. Ammianus understood that it was the worst defeat in Roman history since the Battle of Edessa, and Rufinus called it "the beginning of evils for the Roman Empire then and thereafter."

Valens is also credited with the commission of a short history of the Roman State. This work, produced by Valens' secretary Eutropius, and known by the name Breviarium ab Urbe condita, tells the story of Rome from its founding. According to some historians, Valens was motivated by the necessity of learning Roman history so that he, the royal family, and their appointees might better mix with the Roman senatorial class.

=== Religious policy ===
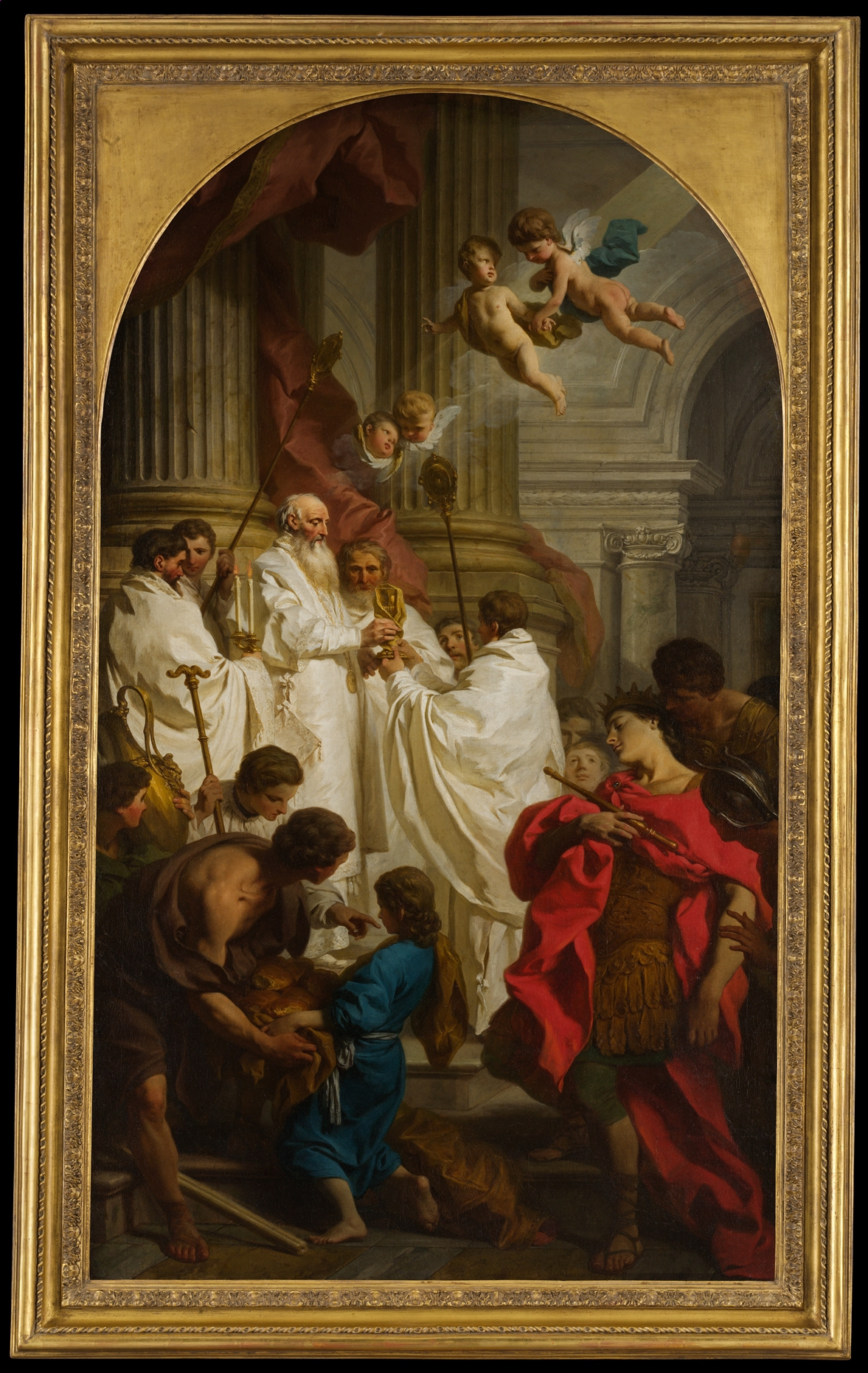
The Mass of Saint Basil by Pierre Subleyras, ca. 1743

During his reign, Valens had to confront the theological diversity that was beginning to create division in the Empire. Julian (361–363) had tried to revive the pagan religions. His reactionary attempt took advantage of the dissensions among the different Christian factions, and a largely Pagan rank and file military. However, in spite of broad support, his actions were often viewed as excessive, and before he died in a campaign against the Persians, he was often treated with disdain. His death was considered a sign from the Christian God.

Valens was baptised by the Arian bishop of Constantinople before he set out on his first war against the Goths. While the Nicene Christian writers of his time identified Valens with the Arian faction and accused him of persecuting Nicene Christians, modern historians have described both Valens and Valentinian I as primarily interested in maintaining social order and have minimized their theological concerns. Although Athanasius was impelled, under his reign, to briefly go into hiding, Valens maintained a close dependency on his brother Valentinian and treated St. Basil mildly, both of whom supported the Nicene position. Not long after Valens died the cause of Arianism in the Roman East was to come to an end. His successor Theodosius I made Nicene Christianity the state religion of Rome and suppressed the Arians.

=== Appearance ===
The coin portraits of Valentinian and Valens give the faces of both emperors "heavy features", rendered with "no animation, and little consistency". Toward the end of his Res Gestae (XXXI.14.7), Ammianus says that Valens was physically compact, dark-complected, and of average height, "knock-kneed, and somewhat pot-bellied", and had a "dimmed" pupil in one eye (the translator John C. Rolfe suggests that this is a description of a cataract).

== See also ==
- Aphrahat (hermit)

== Citations ==
Valens Valentinianic dynasty Born: 328 Died: 9 August 378
Regnal titles
Preceded by Jovian	Roman emperor 364–378; With: Valentinian I, Procopius; Gratian, Valentinian II	Succeeded by Theodosius I
Political offices
Preceded by Jovian; Varronianus	Roman consul 365 with Valentinian I	Succeeded by Gratian; Dagalaifus
Preceded by Lupicinus; Iovinus	Roman consul II; 368 with Valentinian I	Succeeded by Valentinianus Galates; Victor
Preceded by Valentinianus Galates; Victor	Roman consul III; 370 with Valentinian I	Succeeded by Gratian; Sex. Claudius Petronius Probus
Preceded by Domitius Modestus; Arintheus	Roman consul IV; 373 with Valentinian I	Succeeded by Gratian; Equitius
Preceded by Gratian; Equitius	Roman consul V 376 with Valentinian II	Succeeded by Gratian; Merobaudes
Preceded by Gratian; Merobaudes	Roman consul VI; 378 with Valentinian II	Succeeded by Ausonius; Q. Clodius Hermogenianus Olybrius
