= Fravitta =

Gothic military leader

Flavius Fravitta (Greek: Φραουίττα; died 404/405) was a leader of the Goths and a top-ranking officer in the army of the Eastern Roman Empire.

Fravitta was a member of the Thervingi aristocracy. He was also a pagan, and for this reason he was praised by Eunapius, a Greek historian of the 4th–5th centuries.

In 382, the Visigoths had signed a treaty with Roman Emperor Theodosius I, according to which the Visigoths were allowed to live in the Roman territory at the mouth of the Danube, with the rank of foederati, thus providing the Roman army with troops. However, within the Goths there were two parties, which grew more and more hostile to each other. One was formed by the Arian Christian majority, the "Gothic party", led by Eriulf and opposed to the assimilation of the Goths in the Roman culture. Fravitta, on the other side, led those Goths who wanted to stay faithful to the treaty and who wanted to be assimilated. In 391, while Eriulf and Fravitta were both dining with Theodosius, they quarreled, and Fravitta killed Eriulf, and only the intervention of the imperial guards saved him from the vengeful followers of Eriulf; while his support among the Goths decreased, his position at court was strengthened.

Later he married a Roman woman of high rank, thus helping his own assimilation into Roman society, as well as his people's. According to Eunapius, Fravitta required special permission from the Emperor Theodosius I for this marriage. This may not have been due to his Gothic origins but instead due to his status as a pagan.

Fravitta was tasked with suppressing the revolts in the East (395). He likely possessed the rank of comes Isauriae at this time. According to Zosimus, Fravitta was responsible for having "freed the entire East, from Cilicia to Phoenicia and Palestine, from the plague of brigands". Eunapius wrote, probably exaggerating, that the word "banditry" had been forgotten in the minds of the people. He was loyal to the Empire for all of his life, and rose through the ranks of the army, reaching the office of Magister militum.

In 400 he was promoted to Magister Militum per Orientem and tasked with leading the fleet of the Eastern Roman Emperor Arcadius and decisively defeated the fleet of the rebel Arian Goth Gainas, in Thrace, while they were trying to pass to Asia Minor. The Historian Zosimus noted that he was placed in charge of the Roman forces with a unanimous vote from the Senate and the Emperor. Gainas escaped across the Danube, where he was killed by Hunnic chieftain Uldin. As a reward, he asked to be allowed to worship the Pagan gods freely; the Emperor granted him his wish and designated him as consul for 401. Fravitta was also likely given a triumph for his victory. Eunapius records him returning to Constantinople "joyfully and gloriously" with circus games commemorating the defeat of Gainas.

Fravitta fell out of favor around 404 and was executed. Officially, he was accused of treachery under the belief that he had intentionally let Gainas escape. However, he was most likely killed as he had lost favor with the court. Fravitta accused a politician named Ioannes, who was beloved by Empress Eudoxia, of sowing division between Arcadius and Honorius. This led to a follower of Chrysostom named Hierax organizing his execution. Some sources argue that Fravitta was put to death in the year 401. Zosimus, a Roman historian who covered these events, omitted the death of Fravitta from his account, which ends at the year 401. Other accounts from the time do not mention his death as occurring within the year 401, but instead mention his death as occurring around the death of Eudoxia, in the year 404.

== See also ==
- Gento (Goth)
- Gothic Revolt of Tribigild

== Bibliography ==
- Wolfram, Herwig, History of the Goths, University of California Press, 1998, ISBN 0-520-06983-8, pp. 146–147, 149.
- Arnold Hugh Martin Jones, John Martindale, John Morris, Prosopography of the Later Roman Empire, volume 1, Cambridge 1971, p. 372.
- E. W. Brooks, "Le province dell'oriente da Arcadio ad Anastasio", Storia del mondo medievale, volume I, 1999, pp. 445–479
- M. Manitius, "Le migrazioni germaniche 378-412", Storia del mondo medievale, volume I, 1999, pp. 246–274

Political offices
Preceded by Stilicho; Aurelianus	Roman consul 401 with Vincentius	Succeeded by Arcadius; Honorius
