= Domesticus (Roman Empire) =

Roman social class and military rank

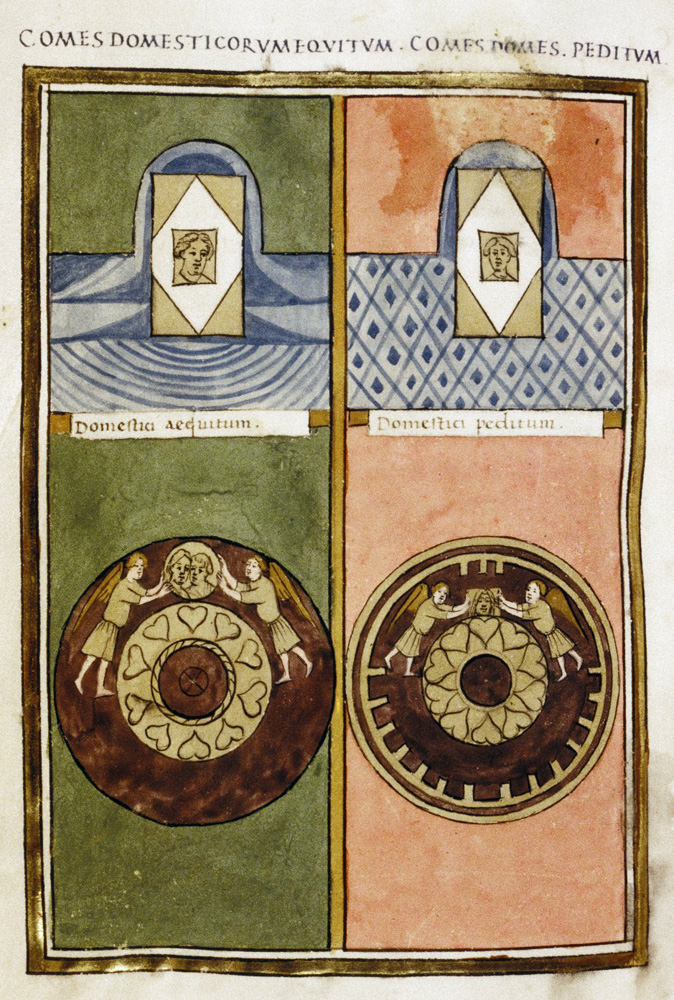
The insignia of office of the two comites domesticorum of the Eastern Empire, according to the Notitia Dignitatum: the shields of the domestici and the codicils of office

The origins of the word domesticus can be traced to the late 3rd century of the Late Roman army. They often held high ranks in various fields, whether it was the servants of a noble house on the civilian side, or a high-ranking military position. After serving under the emperor for a certain duration, the Domestici would be able to become leaders themselves and potentially command their own regiment of legionaries in the military. Relatively, the most important offices were the “Comes Domesticorum” also known as, “Commander of the Protectores Domestici,” and “Comes rei Militaris” or General.

== Origin ==
The domestici rose to prominence during the Crisis of the 3rd Century, the myriad of societal catastrophes nearly led to the collapse of the Roman Empire. The accession of Diocletian and his subsequent reforms ended the continual strife and unstable leadership Ancient Rome had faced during this period. The title of “Domesticus” was developed to advocate for better control over the empire. The domesticus provided defined leadership in the military as officers; oversaw individual households and lands to protect common civilians and servants; and served as palace troops assigned to the emperor himself—all to prevent further crises in the future and transitioning into later periods of the Roman Empire.

== Late Roman Empire ==
The roles of the domestici evolved during the late Roman Empire. From 330 AD to 474 AD they performed a variety of functions. Many held positions as generals and were even elevated to become emperors if they gained enough notability. Constantius Chlorus was a Domesticus who, after many successful military campaigns, became one of the joint Emperors of the Roman Empire with Maximian. Many of the notable Domestici of the Roman Empire lived around the time period in which the Roman Empire was splitting into its eastern and western halves. Many of Diocletian's successors mirrored his successes because they too, after many military successes, gained a lot of notability and took the throne as emperor from the sitting emperor, although many did not have long reigns because of the instability of the western Roman Empire. These emperors were the ones that did realize, because of their military experience, that it was not possible to sustain the size of the late Roman Empire leading to them continuing Diocletian's idea to have it separated into the eastern and western halves. This cycle of instability and military rule in the western Roman Empire continued until its fall in 476.

== Byzantine Empire ==
As the Byzantine Empire was gaining strength, new patterns in governing emerged. Under the rule of the Byzantine Emperor Anastasius I, the successor to Zeno, the title of Domesticus began evolving and was often used as synonyms of Vicarius and Locoservator. The translation of Domesticus, Vicarius, and Locoservator respectively mean belonging to a house, Vice meaning deputy or substitute for a superior, and subordinate to the count or duke.

== Notable Domestici ==
- Aidoingus
- Ammianus Marcellinus
- Count Aelianus (prior to career as Count)
- Constantius I
- Diocletian
- Jovian
- Magnentius
- Maximinus Daia
- Glycerius
- Tarasis, after successfully plotting against the Gothic general Aspar, he was given this title by the emperor Leo. Tarasis later succeeded Leo I as Emperor Zeno.

== See also ==
- Domestikos
