= Procopius (usurper) =

Roman usurper from 365 to 366

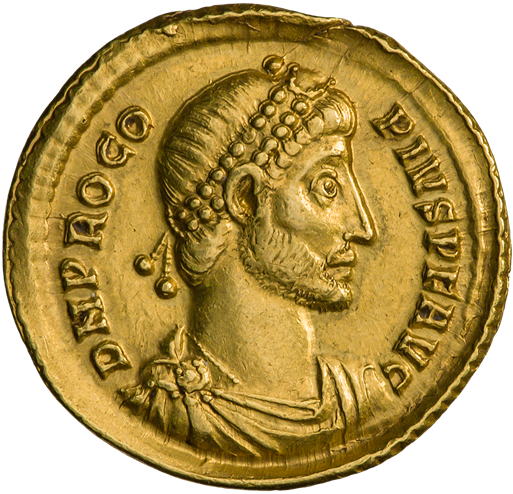
- Obverse of a Solidus depicting Procopius

Roman emperor
- Reign: 28 September 365 – 27 May 366 (against Valens)
- Predecessor: Valens and Valentinian I
- Successor: Valens and Valentinian I Marcellus (as an usurper)
- Born: July 325; Corycus, Cilicia
- Died: 27 May 366 (aged 40)
- Wife: Artemisia (probably)
- Issue: Procopius
- Mother: Sister of Basilina

Procopius (/proʊˈkoʊpiəs/; Latin: Procopius; Ancient Greek: Προκόπιος; July 325 – 27 May 366) was a Roman usurper against Valens, who ruled from 365 to 366.

== Life ==
Procopius was born in July 325, in Corycus, Cilicia (now Turkey). On his mother's side, Procopius was a maternal cousin to emperor Julian, since their maternal grandfather was Julius Julianus. His first wife was probably Artemisia. The Roman general of the 5th century Procopius and his son, the Emperor Anthemius, were among his descendants, the first being the son of his son Procopius.

During the reign of Constantius II, he served as tribunus et notarius for a long period of time. By 358, the emperor trusted him enough to send him with Lucillianus as an envoy to the Sassanid court. His career granted him the opportunity to build many important connections, as well as to help him understand the structure of the imperial government.

== Persian campaign ==
When Julian departed from Constantinople in the spring of 362, his objective was clear: to launch a swift, decisive campaign against the Sasanian Empire rather than engage in a prolonged war. His primary aim was to strike directly at the Sassanid capital Ctesiphon and force Shapur II into a battle or negotiations. Procopius entered Julian's retinue and took part in his campaign against the Sassanids in 363. After leaving Antioch on 5 March 363, Julian's army quickly crossed the Euphrates river, gathering at Carrhae shortly thereafter.

=== Into enemy territory ===
Meanwhile, Procopius was entrusted with fortifying Roman defenses in Mesopotamia. Tasked with leading a force of around 30,000 men, Procopius and his subordinate, Sebastianus, were stationed to defend key positions along the Upper Tigris River, anticipating an advance from Shapur's forces. Procopius was tasked with coordinating Roman defensive efforts in the east, specifically working with King Arsaces II of Armenia to secure the strategically vital Bitlis Pass. Procopius's efforts were vital in securing the eastern front and preparing for the Persian response to Julian's offensive.

Procopius prepared for the possibility of advancing his troops southward to join with Emperor Julian's soldiers in Assyria. This location was crucial for controlling access between the Roman and Persian spheres of influence, and its defense was integral to safeguarding the Roman presence in the region. In a display of military strategy, Emperor Julian led a formidable force of 65,000 soldiers down the Euphrates River within just eight weeks. However, Julian was fatally injured in a skirmish on 26 June, bringing an abrupt end to the ill-fated campaign. When Procopius reached the main Roman army near Thilsaphata, between Nisibis and Singara, he met the new emperor, Jovian.

Though Julian had died without naming a successor, a rumor spread that he had ordered Procopius to take the purple in case of his death. Fearing Jovian's wrath, which had caused the death of another army candidate to the throne, also named Jovianus, Procopius went into hiding, but later supervised the transport of Julian's body to Tarsus and its subsequent burial, and only later went to Caesarea with his family.

After Jovian's death, the new emperors, Valentinian I and Valens, sent some soldiers to arrest Procopius. He surrendered, but asked to meet his family; he had his captors dine and drink, and then seized the opportunity to flee with his family, first to the Black Sea and later to the Tauric Chersonese, where they hid. However, Procopius lived in constant fear of betrayal or exposure, and decided to go to Constantinople, the Empire's capital, to ask Strategius for help.

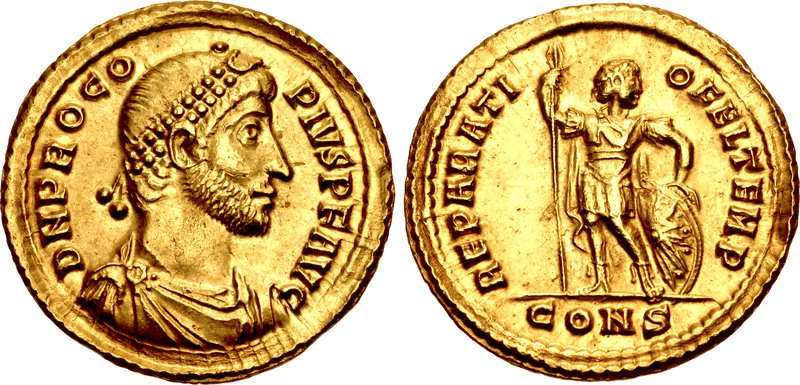
Solidus of Procopius minted in Constantinople in 365, depicting himself on the obverse and depicting himself as a soldier on the reverse

Becoming aware of discontent caused by the policies of Valens's praetorian prefect and father-in-law, Petronius, Procopius decided to declare himself Emperor. He bribed two legions, which were then resting at Constantinople, to support his efforts and took control of the imperial city. Shortly after this, he proclaimed himself Emperor on 28 September 365 and quickly took control of the provinces of Thrace and later Bithynia. Procopius promoted himself as an educated philosopher, well versed in the Greek language of the Eastern Empire, and highlighted Valens's weakness in this area to gain the support of the Hellenized Eastern aristocrats. He also emphasized his link to the Constantinian dynasty by appearing in public with Constantius II's widow, Faustina, and their daughter, Constantia, an act that Ammianus considered to have earned him greater support.

Though Valens initially despaired of subduing the rebellion, and was inclined to come to terms with the usurper, he quickly rallied, guided by the counsels of Salutius and Arintheus, and the superior ability of his generals prevailed in two battles at Thyatira and Nacolia where Procopius's forces were defeated. He fled the battlefield, and was for a while a fugitive in the wilds of Phrygia, but was soon betrayed to Valens due to the treachery of his two generals Agilonius and Gomoarius, he was captured. Valens had his rival executed on 27 May 366 through beheading. His head was then sent to Valens's elder brother and co-emperor Valentinian I.

== See also ==
- List of Roman usurpers

== Sources ==
- Curran, John (1998). "From Jovian to Theodosius". In Averil Cameron & Peter Garnsey (eds.). The Cambridge Ancient History XIII: The Late Empire, A.D. 337–425. Cambridge University Press. ISBN 0-521-30200-5.
- Hughes, Ian (5 August 2013). Imperial Brothers: Valentinian, Valens and the Disaster at Adrianople. Pen and Sword. ISBN 978-1-4738-2863-6.
- Jones, A. H. M.; J. R. Martindale & J. Morris (1971). Prosopography of the Later Roman Empire. Vol. 1. Cambridge University Press. ISBN 0-521-07233-6.
- Lenski, Noel (2003). Failure of Empire: Valens and the Roman State in the Fourth Century A.D. Berkeley: University of California Press. ISBN 0-520-23332-8.
- Potter, David S. (2004). The Roman Empire at Bay: AD 180–395. New York: Routledge. ISBN 0-415-10057-7.
