= AD 383 =

383 in various calendars
- Gregorian calendar: 383; CCCLXXXIII
- Ab urbe condita: 1136
- Assyrian calendar: 5133
- Balinese saka calendar: 304–305
- Bengali calendar: −211 – −210
- Berber calendar: 1333
- Buddhist calendar: 927
- Burmese calendar: −255
- Byzantine calendar: 5891–5892
- Chinese calendar: 壬午年 (Water Horse); 3080 or 2873 — to — 癸未年 (Water Goat); 3081 or 2874
- Coptic calendar: 99–100
- Discordian calendar: 1549
- Ethiopian calendar: 375–376
- Hebrew calendar: 4143–4144
- Hindu calendars
- Vikram Samvat: 439–440
- Shaka Samvat: 304–305
- Kali Yuga: 3483–3484
- Holocene calendar: 10383
- Iranian calendar: 239 BP – 238 BP
- Islamic calendar: 246 BH – 245 BH
- Javanese calendar: 266–267
- Julian calendar: 383; CCCLXXXIII
- Korean calendar: 2716
- Minguo calendar: 1529 before ROC 民前1529年
- Nanakshahi calendar: −1085
- Seleucid era: 694/695 AG
- Thai solar calendar: 925–926
- Tibetan calendar: ཆུ་ཕོ་རྟ་ལོ་ (male Water-Horse); 509 or 128 or −644 — to — ཆུ་མོ་ལུག་ལོ་ (female Water-Sheep); 510 or 129 or −643

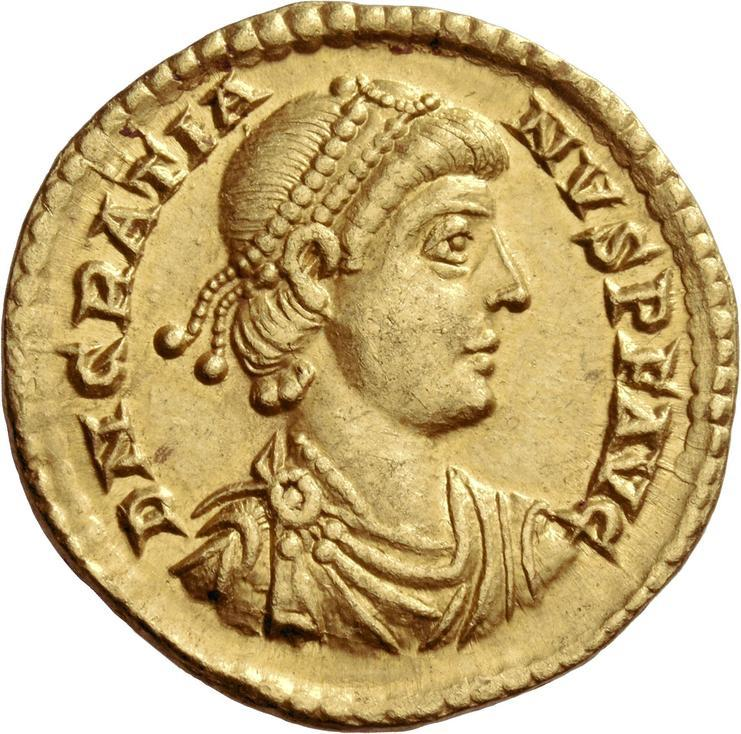
Solidus of Emperor Gratian (359–383)

Year 383 (CCCLXXXIII) was a common year starting on Sunday of the Julian calendar. At the time, it was known as the Year of the Consulship of Merobaudes and Saturninus (or, less frequently, year 1136 Ab urbe condita). The denomination 383 for this year has been used since the early medieval period, when the Anno Domini calendar era became the prevalent method in Europe for naming years.

== Events ==
=== By place ===
==== Britannia ====
- Niall of the Nine Hostages becomes the first High King of Ireland.
- Magnus Maximus withdraws Roman troops from the region of Wales, marking the effective end of Roman rule in Wales.

==== Roman Empire ====
- January 19 – Arcadius is elevated to Emperor.
- Roman troops in Britannia proclaim Magnus Maximus as their Emperor. He crosses over to the continent and makes Trier his capital. Gaul, the Italian provinces and Hispania proclaim loyalty to him.
- August 25 – Emperor Gratian, age 24, is assassinated at Lugdunum (modern-day Lyon), leaving a young widow Laeta. Pannonia and Africa maintain their allegiance to co-emperor Valentinian II, now 12, whose mother, Justina, rules in his name.
- Emperor Theodosius I cedes Dacia and Macedonia to Valentinian II. They recognize Magnus Maximus as Augustus.
- Theodosius I sends Flavius Stilicho as an envoy to the Persian court of King Shapur III at Ctesiphon, to negotiate a peace settlement relating to the partition of Armenia.

==== Asia ====
- Battle of Fei River (Feishui): Former Qin forces are defeated by the numerically inferior Eastern Jin army in Anhui, preserving the Jin state in the south and precipitating the destruction of Former Qin in the north.
- King Ardashir II dies after a 4-year reign. He is succeeded by his son Shapur III.

=== By topic ===
==== Religion ====
- First Council of Constantinople (some authorities date this council to 381): Theodosius I calls a general council to affirm and extend the Nicene Creed, and denounce Arianism and Apollinarism. Most trinitarian Christian churches consider this an Ecumenical council.
- By the order of Theodosius I, Eunomius of Cyzicus is banished to Moesia.

== Births ==
- Lupus of Troyes, French bishop and saint (approximate date)

== Deaths ==
- May 30 – Isaac of Dalmatia, Byzantine Orthodox priest and saint
- August 25 – Gratian, Roman Emperor (assassinated) (b. 359)
- October 21 – Ursula, Roman Christian martyr and saint
- Ardashir II, Sassanid king (shah) ("King of Kings")
- Flavia Maxima Constantia, daughter of Constantius II
- Frumentius, Phoenician missionary and bishop
- Fu Rong, Chinese general and prime minister
- Ulfilas (or Wulfila), Gothic missionary and bishop
