= Albia =

Albia may refer to:

- Albia gens, an ancient Roman family
- Albia Terentia, mother of Roman emperor Otho
- Albia Dominica, wife of Roman emperor Valens
- Albia, a medieval name for the river Elbe
- Albia, Iowa, a city in the United States
- Albia, the setting of the Creatures artificial life series of programs
- Albia (mite), a genus in the mite family Aturidae.
