= Faustina (wife of Constantius II) =

Roman empress in 361

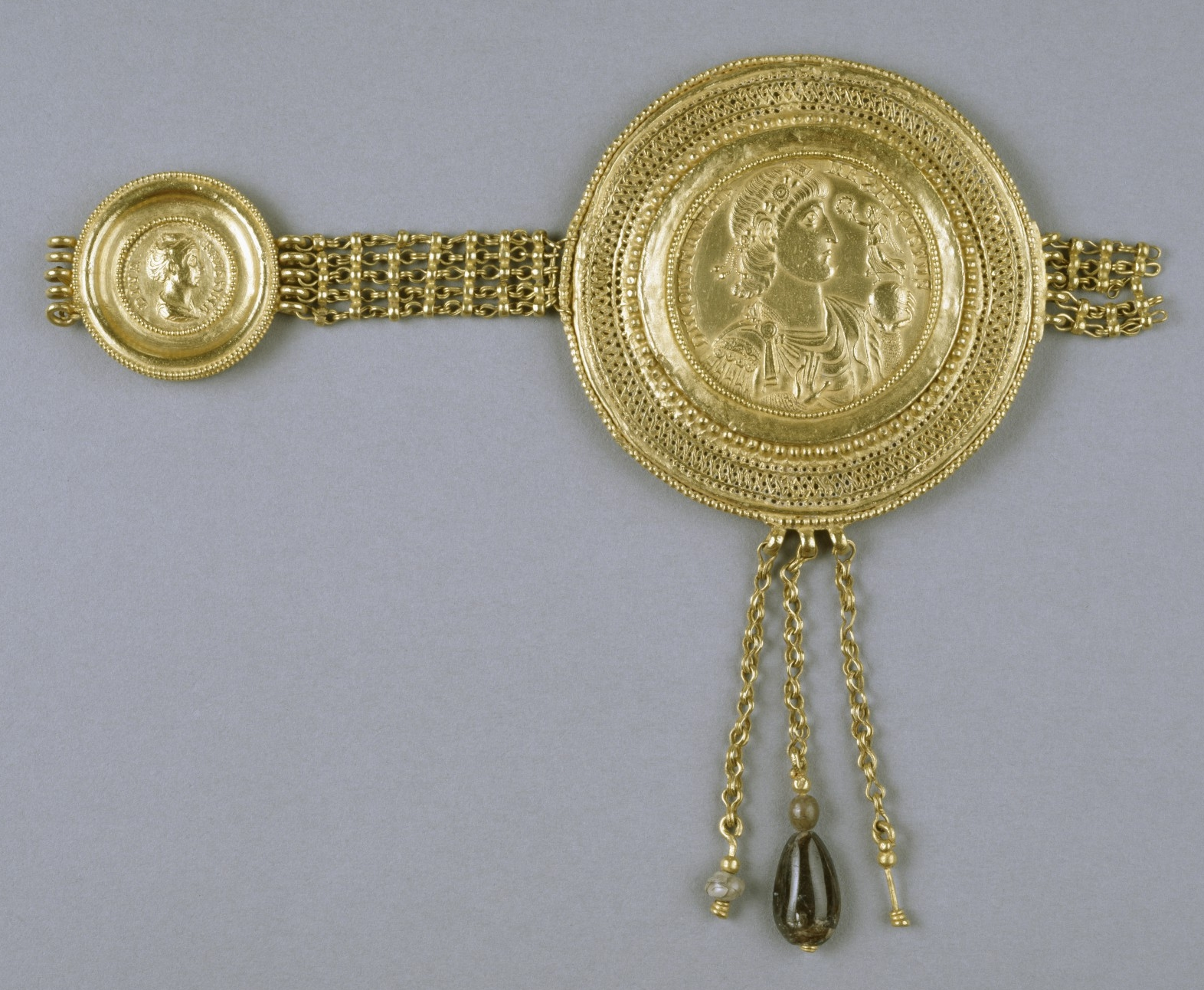
- Medallions of Faustina and Constantius II; the former appears to be reused from a 2nd-century coin depicting the deified Faustina the Elder, wife of Antoninus Pius

Roman empress
- Tenure: 361
- Died: uncertain date after 366
- Spouse: Constantius II
- Issue: Constantia
- Dynasty: Constantinian

Faustina was a Roman empress as the third wife of the emperor Constantius II. The main source for her biography is the account of historian Ammianus Marcellinus. Her origins and other names are unknown.

== Marriage ==
Constantius married her in Antioch in 361, after the death of his second wife, Eusebia in 360. Ammianus simply reports that the marriage took place while Constantius was wintering in Antioch, taking a break from the ongoing Roman–Persian Wars. "At that same time Constantius took to wife Faustina, having long since lost Eusebia".

She was pregnant when Constantius died on 3 November 361 and later gave birth to their posthumous daughter, Constantia, the only child of the emperor. Constantia later married Emperor Gratian.

== Widow ==
On 28 September 365 Procopius declared himself emperor in Constantinople, intending to depose the incumbent emperor Valens. The usurper's strongest claim to the throne was his kinship with the revered Constantinian dynasty, and he emphasized this link by keeping Faustina and her little daughter constantly near him in his public appearances.

Ammianus considers that Procopius having Faustina and Constantia by his side increased the loyalty of the people to his cause:

"[Valens] was met with general and obstinate resistance, for this reason in particular — that his enemy (as has been mentioned) both on the march and when they were almost in battle array, carried about with him in a litter the little daughter of Constantius, and her mother Faustina; and thereby had inflamed the passions of the soldiers to fight more bravely in defence of the imperial stock, with which he claimed that he himself was connected."

After the Battle of Thyatira and the fall of Procopius in 366, any more details about Faustina are unknown.

Royal titles
Preceded by Eusebia	Roman empress consort 361	Succeeded by Charito
Preceded by Helena	Roman empress consort 361	Succeeded by Charito
