= Placilla (disambiguation) =

Placilla may refer to:

- Placilla, the Chilean town;
- Placilla, a variant name for Aelia Flaccilla, wife of the Roman Emperor Theodosius I (the Great).
