= List of Roman and Byzantine empresses =

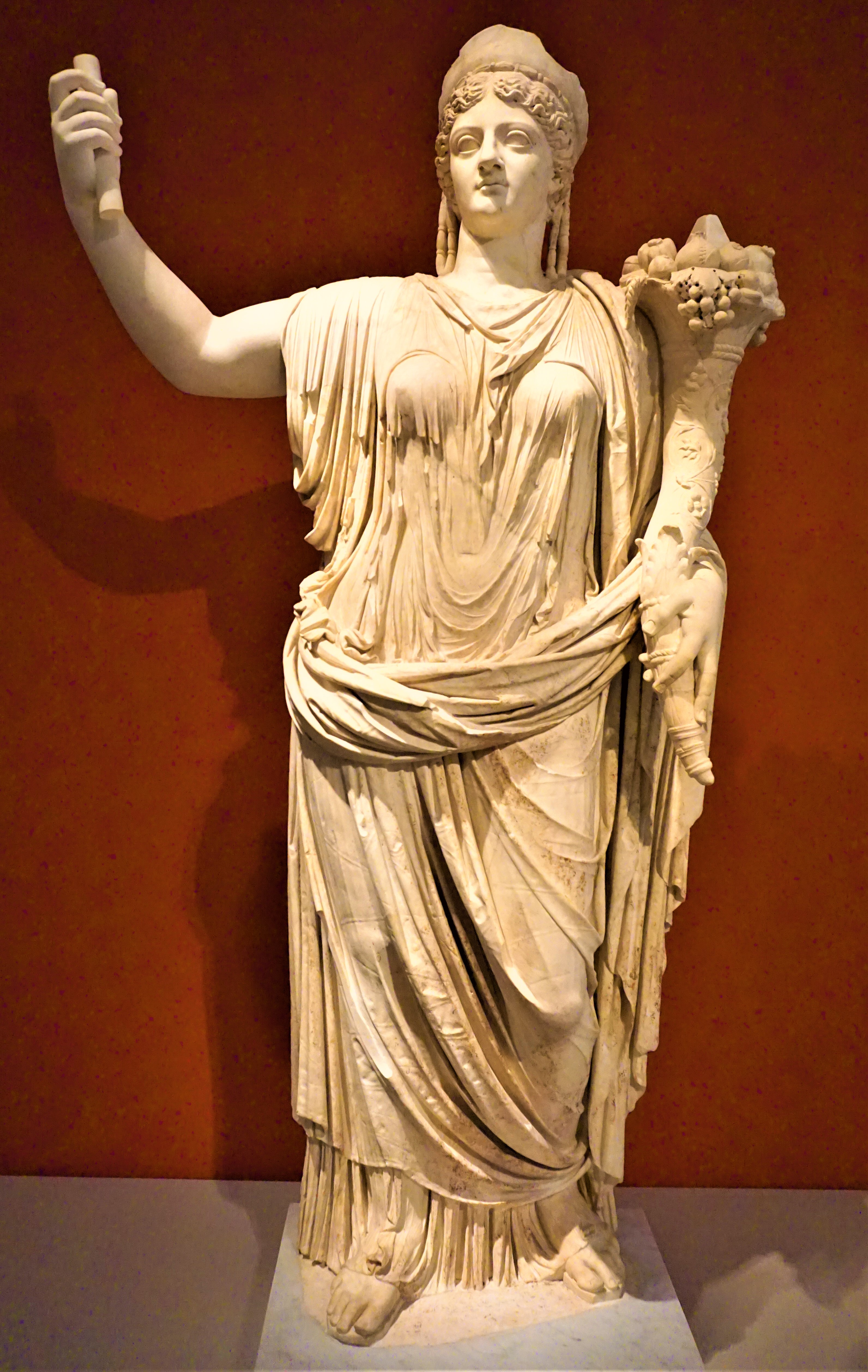
Livia (r. 27 BC – AD 14), as wife of Augustus, was the first and longest-reigning empress.

The term Roman empress usually refers to the consorts of the Roman emperors, the rulers of the Roman Empire. The duties, power and influence of empresses varied depending on the time period, contemporary politics and the personalities of their husband and themselves. Empresses were typically highly regarded and respected, and many wielded great influence over imperial affairs. Several empresses served as regents on behalf of their husbands or sons and a handful ruled as empresses regnant, governing in their own right without a husband.

Given that there were sometimes more than one concurrent Roman emperor, there were also sometimes two or more concurrent Roman empresses. For most of the period from 286 to 480, the Roman Empire, though remaining a single polity, was administratively divided into the Western Roman Empire and the Eastern Roman Empire. Through most of this period, the separated imperial courts had their own lines of succession and respective empresses. The Western empire fell in the late 5th century; its final empress was the wife of Emperor Julius Nepos. The Eastern empire, also known as the 'Byzantine Empire', endured until the fall of Constantinople in 1453; its final empress was Maria of Trebizond, wife of Emperor John VIII Palaiologos.

Though the constitutional power of empresses was never defined, it was generally accepted that their coronation, performed after that of their husbands, granted them some imperial power. Often, their primary duties were to oversee the organization of ceremonies at the imperial court as well as to partake in imperial and religious affairs. Although governmental power was most often vested only in the emperor, empresses could gain significant authority as regents for young children or when their husbands were absent. Though they were bound by the wishes and temperaments of their husbands, empress consorts could at times also effectively become influential co-regents. In some cases, emperors reinforced their legitimacy through marrying the daughter of a previous emperor. In such cases, empresses sometimes stressed their dynastic legitimacy, greater than that of their husbands, to achieve great influence.

Several influential consorts, such as Theodora, wife of Justinian I, and Euphrosyne, wife of Alexios III, held their own courts. Theodora and Euphrosyne, during their husbands' reigns, established a parallel court alongside the imperial court—a separate palace with their own staff, royal attendants, and imperial guard, with their own imperial seal. State affairs were reported to them, and decrees issued by them carried the same weight as those of the emperor. Additionally, empresses, Irene of Montferrat, wife of emperor Andronikos II Palaiologos, and Anna of Savoy, wife of emperor Andronikos III Palaiologos and mother of emperor John V Palaiologos, left Constantinople for Thessalonica and established their own courts, ruling independently in that province. Irene did so following a disagreement with her husband over succession, while Anna, after losing in the Second Civil War (1341–1347), establishing her own court in Thessalonica and acting independently.

== Titles ==
Byzantine empresses' clothing reconstruction (6th-15th centuries)

There was no single official term for the position of "empress" in Ancient Rome.

=== Common titles ===
- The Latin title augusta (Greek: αὐγούστα, augoústa), the female form of augustus, was usually given to Roman consorts. Insofar as augustus is understood as meaning "emperor", then a given woman could not become "empress" until being named augusta. However, not all consorts were given the title by their husbands. The title was sometimes given to other female members of the family, so "empress" and augusta are not always treated as synonyms.
- The Greek title basilissa (βασίλισσα), the female form of basileus, was a common title for Byzantine empresses. Empress regnant Irene sometimes adopted the male title basileus.
- The title despoina (δέσποινα), the female form of despotes, was also a common title for Byzantine empresses.

=== Noncommon titles ===
- The title femina princeps, meaning "female princeps", was used for Livia, etc.
- The title domina nostra, the female form of dominus noster, was used for Galeria Valeria, etc.
- The honorific title mater castrorum ("mother of the castra") was later expanded to mater castrorum et senatus et patriae ("mother of the castra, senate and fatherland"), the female form of pater patriae ("father of the fatherland"), and was granted to some empresses in the 2nd and 3rd centuries.
- The title caesarissa (Greek: καισάρισσα, kaisarissa), the female form of caesar, was used for Ino Anastasia, etc. Meaning the wife of a caesar, it was originally the second-ranking female title in the Roman Empire after the augusta.
- The Latin title imperatrix, the feminine form of imperator, was used for Pulcheria, etc. It seems to have rarely been used for Roman empresses.
- The title autokratorissa (αυτοκρατόρισσα), the female form of autokrator, was used for Anna of Savoy, etc. Only a few empresses had this title. Empresses regnant Zoe and Theodora sometimes adopted the male title autokrator.
- The title sebaste, the feminine form of sebastos, was used for Maria Skleraina, etc. It was the Greek translation of augusta and ranked as a quasi-empress.

== Principate (27 BC – AD 284) ==
=== Julio-Claudian dynasty (27 BC – AD 68) ===
– Empresses who were not consorts or monarchs

Portrait (Note: When no contemporary depictions exist, portraits are taken from the 16th-century Speculum Romanae Magnificentiae by Antonio Lafreri (1512–1577), who included a collection of empresses from Julius Caesar to Charles V, Holy Roman Emperor. Needless to say, these portraits are purely imaginary.)	Name	Tenure	Life details & notes	Emperor (spouse)	Ref
	Livia Drusilla	16 January 27 BC – 19 August AD 14 (40 years, 7 months and 3 days)	30 January 59 BC – AD 29 (aged 87) Daughter of Marcus Livius Drusus Claudianus; married Tiberius Claudius Nero in 43 BC and then Octavian on 17 January 38 BC. Known as Julia Augusta after his death; deified by Claudius on 17 January AD 42.	Octavian Augustus (r. 27 BC – AD 14)	
	Julia Augusta (widow)	September AD 14 – AD 29 (15 years, as augusta)	30 January 59 BC – AD 29 (aged 87) Daughter of Marcus Livius Drusus Claudianus; married Tiberius Claudius Nero in 43 BC and then Octavian on 17 January 38 BC. Known as Julia Augusta after his death; deified by Claudius on 17 January AD 42.	Octavian Augustus (r. 27 BC – AD 14)	
	Orestilla (Note: Her full name is disputed; Suetonius calls her "Livia Orestilla", but Cassius Dio and later historians call her "Cornelia Orestina". See Kajava 1984.)	c. AD 37 (very briefly) (Note: Divorced "within a few days" according to Suetonius, but "before two months had elapsed" according to Dio. The latter figure may actually refer to the period between the divorce and her exile, which was two years according to Suetonius.)	Second wife of Caligula; forced to marry him immediately after her marriage to Gaius Calpurnius Piso. After the divorce they were both exiled for alleged adultery. Probably the shortest-reigning empress.	Caligula (r. 37–41)	
	Lollia Paulina	c. AD 38 (a few months) (Note: Suetonius states that Caligula divorced Paulina "in a short time". Dio explains that Caesonia was Caligulas' mistress and that she got pregnant during this time. Suetonius writes that Caesonia married on the same day she gave birth, while Dio states that she married one month before giving birth.)	Daughter of Marcus Lollius, originally married to Publius Memmius Regulus. Forced to commit suicide.	Caligula (r. 37–41)	
	Milonia Caesonia	Summer 39 – 24 January 41 (about 1 year and a half)	Born on 3 June of an unknown date, married to another man before becoming Caligula's mistress. Murdered alongside Caligula and their daughter Julia Drusilla.	Caligula (r. 37–41)	
	Julia Drusilla (?) (sister)	Posthumously named augusta in AD 38	R. B. Hoffsten considered Drusilla to have also become Augusta, because, after her death, she received all the honors that Livia had received.	Caligula (r. 37–41)	
	Antonia Minor (mother)	Posthumously named augusta in AD 41	31 January 36 BC – 1 May 37 AD (aged 72) Mother of Claudius; daughter of Mark Antony and Octavia Minor.	Claudius (r. 41–54)	
	Valeria Messalina	24 January 41 – AD 48 (7 years)	Daughter of Marcus Valerius Messalla. Executed after having an affair with Gaius Silius; suffered damnatio memoriae.	Claudius (r. 41–54)	
	Agrippina the Younger; Julia Agrippina	1 January 49 – 13 October 54 (5 years, 9 months and 12 days)	6 November 15 – 23 March 59 (aged 43) Daughter of Germanicus Julius Caesar, sister of Caligula, and mother of Nero, named augusta in AD 50. Murdered on the orders of Nero.	Claudius (r. 41–54)	
	Claudia Octavia	13 October 54 – AD 62 (7 years and a few months)	39/40 AD – 9 June 62 (aged 22–23) Daughter of Claudius and Valeria Messalina. Exiled and later executed.	Nero (r. 54–68)	
	Poppaea Sabina	AD 62 – AD 65 (3 years)	30/32 AD – early Summer 65 (aged 33–35) Daughter of Titus Ollius; married Rufrius Crispinus c. 50, then the future emperor Otho in 58. Named augusta shortly after Claudia's birth in January 63, posthumously deified.	Nero (r. 54–68)	
	Claudia (daughter)	Posthumously named augusta in AD 63	Only daughter of Nero and Sabina; was born on 21 January 63 and died on May of the same year.	Nero (r. 54–68)	
	Statilia Messalina	early 66 – 9 June 68 (2 years)	c. 35 – after 68 Daughter of Titus Statilius Taurus (consul 44), married consul Marcus Julius Vestinus Atticus in AD 63/64. Married Nero after the forced suicide of her husband.	Nero (r. 54–68)	

=== Year of the Four Emperors (69) ===
Portrait	Name	Tenure	Life details & notes	Emperor	Ref
	Sextilia (mother)	69 (as augusta)	Mother of Vitellius.	Vitellius (r. 69)	
	Galeria Fundana	19 April – 20 December 69 (8 months and 1 day)	Born on 3 January of an unknown date. Daughter of a pretor; possibly related to Publius Galerius Trachalus.	Vitellius (r. 69)	

=== Flavian dynasty (81–96) ===
Portrait	Name	Tenure	Life details & notes	Emperor	Ref
	Flavia Domitilla (daughter)	Posthumously named augusta by AD 80	Only daughter of Vespasian and Domitilla the Elder, mother of Saint Domitilla	Vespasian (r. 69–79)	
	Julia Flavia (daughter)	79 – 91 (as augusta)	Daughter of Titus.	Titus (r. 79–81)	
	Domitia Longina	14 September 81 – 18 September 96 (15 years and 4 days)	11 February 50/55 – c. 126 (aged approx. 70–76) Daughter of general Gnaeus Domitius Corbulo, first married to senator Lucius Aelius Aelianus. Named augusta after her marriage to Domitian. Survived her husband's assassination and died during the reign of Hadrian.	Domitian (r. 81–96)	

=== Nerva–Antonine dynasty (98–192) ===
All empresses of this period received the title augusta.

Portrait	Name	Tenure	Life details & notes	Emperor	Ref
	Pompeia Plotina	28 January 98 – 11 August 117 (19 years, 6 months and 14 days)	c. 70 (?) – c. 123 (aged approx. 53) Daughter of Lucius Pompeius, named augusta around 105, posthumously deified. She was interested in Epicurean philosophical school. May have been involved in the appointment of Hadrian as successor.	Trajan (r. 98–117)	
	Ulpia Marciana (sister)	c. 105 – 114 (about 9 years, as augusta)	15/30 August c. 48 – 29 August 122 (aged approx. 74) Sister of Trajan. She was given the title of augusta, but apparently did not immediately accept it	Trajan (r. 98–117)	
	Salonia Matidia (niece)	29 August 112 – 119 (7 years, as augusta)	4 July 68 – 23 December 119 (aged 51) Daughter of Ulpia Marciana and praetor Gaius Salonius Matidius Patruinus, in practice adopted daughter of Trajan. Great grand-mother of Marcus Aurelius	Trajan (r. 98–117)	
	Vibia Sabina	11 August 117 – c. 137 (c. 20 years)	c. 85 – 136/137 (aged approx. 52) Daughter of senator Lucius Vibius Sabinus, married Hadrian around 100, named augusta around 119, posthumously deified.	Hadrian (r. 117–138)	
	Faustina the Elder; Annia Galeria Faustina	10 July 138 – late October 140 (2 years and 3 months)	c. 97 (Note: The Feriale Duranum records the birthday of "Faustina wife of Antoninus" as 20/22 September. However, it's not possible to determine if this refers to Faustina I, wife of Titus Aelius Antoninus Pius, or Faustina II, wife of Marcus Aurelius Antoninus) – late October 140 (aged approx. 43) Daughter of Marcus Annius Verus the Elder, married Antoninus around 120, named augusta in 138, posthumously deified	Antoninus Pius (r. 138–161)	
	Faustina the Younger; Annia Galeria Faustina	7 March 161 – 175 (14 years)	c. 130 – 176 (aged approx. 46) Daughter of Antoninus Pius, betrothed to Lucius Verus on 25 February 138, married Marcus Aurelius on 13 May (?) 145. Named augusta on 1 December 147 and mater castrorum (mother of the castra) in 174, posthumously deified.	Marcus Aurelius (r. 161–180)	
	Lucilla; Annia Aurelia Galeria Lucilla	163 (?) – 169 (6 years)	7 March 149 – 181/182 (aged 32–33) Daughter of Marcus Aurelius, betrothed to Lucius Verus in 161, named augusta shortly after the marriage. Exiled to Capri and executed by Commodus.	Lucius Verus (r. 161–169)	
	Bruttia Crispina	178 – 191/2 (3–4 years)	Daughter of Gaius Bruttius Praesens (consul 153), named augusta after her marriage with Commodus, sometime before 3 August 178. Exiled to Capri for alleged adultery and executed soon after; suffered damnatio memoriae.	Commodus (r. 180–192) (Note: Commodus was named co-emperor in 177, at the age of 16.)	

=== Year of the Five Emperors (193) ===
All empresses of this period received the title augusta.

Portrait	Name	Tenure	Life details & notes	Emperor	Ref
	Flavia Titiana	1 January – 28 March 193 (2 months and 27 days)	Daughter of Titus Flavius Claudius Sulpicianus. Her fate is unknown, but she probably was spared alongside her children	Pertinax (r. 193)	
	Manlia Scantilla	28 March – 1 June 193 (2 months and 4 days)	Named augusta alongside her daughter.	Didius Julianus (r. 193)	
	Didia Clara (daughter)	AD 193 (briefly as augusta)	Survived the death of Didius Julianus but her fate is unknown.	Didius Julianus (r. 193)	

=== Severan dynasty (193–227) ===
All empresses of this period were named augusta on or shortly after their marriage.

Portrait	Name	Tenure	Life details & notes	Emperor	Ref
	Julia Domna	9 April 193 – 4 February 211 (17 years, 9 months and 26 days)	October/December c. 170 – April 217 (aged approx. 47) Daughter of Julius Bassianus, high priest of the Elagabal cult. Married Severus in 185, named augusta on 1 June 193, posthumously deified. After 211 she held the title of mater castrorum et senatus et patriae.	Septimius Severus (r. 193–211)	
	Publia Fulvia Plautilla	9/15 April 202 – c. 22 January 205 (1 year and 9 months)	Daughter of Gaius Fulvius Plautianus. Divorced after the execution of her father; killed by Caracalla in 211; suffered damnatio memoriae.	Caracalla (r. 211–217) (Note: Caracalla was named co-emperor in 198, still less than 10 years old.)	
	Nonia Celsa (?)	217 – 218 (?) (1 year?)	Probably fictional.	Macrinus (r. 217–218)	
	Julia Soaemias (mother)	8 June 218 – 11 March 222 (as augusta)	Daughter of Julia Maesa, sister of Julia Avita Mamaea, and niece of Julia Domna. Murdered by the Praetorian Guard alongside her son Elagabalus.	Elagabalus (r. 218–222)	
	Julia Cornelia Paula	c. 220 (about 1 year or less)	Of noble descent; divorced.	Elagabalus (r. 218–222)	
	Julia Aquilia Severa	c. 220 / 221 (about 1 year or less) late 221 – March 222 (less than a year)	A Vestal Virgin of noble descent. Divorced but later remarried to Elagabalus, styled augusta, mater castrorum, senatus ac patriae.	Elagabalus (r. 218–222)	
	Annia Faustina; Annia Aurelia Faustina	221 (a few months)	Daughter of Tiberius Claudius Severus Proculus and descendant of emperor Marcus Aurelius. Divorced shortly after the marriage.	Elagabalus (r. 218–222)	
	Julia Maesa (grandmother)	218 – after November 224 (as augusta)	Sister of Julia Domna and mother of Julia Soaemias and Julia Mamaea. Was instrumental in her grandsons Elagabalus and Severus Alexander's accession.	Elagabalus (r. 218–222)	
	Julia Maesa (grandmother)	218 – after November 224 (as augusta)	Sister of Julia Domna and mother of Julia Soaemias and Julia Mamaea. Was instrumental in her grandsons Elagabalus and Severus Alexander's accession.	Severus Alexander (r. 222–235)	
	Julia Avita Mamaea (mother)	222 – 21/22 March 235 (as augusta)	Daughter of Julia Maesa, niece of Julia Domna, and sister of Julia Soaemias. Advised Severus Alexander in government. Murdered by the rebelling troops alongside her son.	Severus Alexander (r. 222–235)	
	Sallustia Orbiana; Gnaea Seia Herennia Sallustia Barbia Orbiana	225 – 227 (2 years)	Daughter of Lucius Seius Herennius Sallustius; exiled to Africa.	Severus Alexander (r. 222–235)	

=== Crisis of the Third Century (235–285) ===
All empresses during this period received the title augusta, with the sole exception of Numerian's wife.

Portrait	Name	Tenure	Life details & notes	Emperor	Ref
	Caecilia Paulina	235 (?) (very briefly?)	Most likely dead by the time Maximinus became emperor. She was deified by her husband.	Maximinus I (r. 235–238)	
	Fabia Orestilla (?)	238 (?) (22 days?)	Probably fictional.	Gordian I (r. 238)	
	Tranquillina; Furia Sabinia Tranquillina	12 May (?) 241 – c. February 244 (2 years and a half)	Daughter of Gaius Furius Sabinius Aquila Timesitheus; unknown fate.	Gordian III (r. 238–244)	
	Marcia Otacilia Severa	244 – 248 (?) (c. 4 years)	Daughter or sister of a man called Severianus.	Philip (r. 244–249)	
	Herennia Etruscilla; Herennia Cupressenia Etruscilla	249 – 251 (2 years)	Of a noble Etrurian descent. Died in 253.	Decius (r. 249–251)	
	Gaia Cornelia Supera	253 (3 months)	Known from numismatic evidence. Her inscriptions suffered damnatio memoriae.	Aemilianus (r. 253)	
	Egnatia Mariniana (?)	Posthumously named augusta from AD 253	D. Calomino considered that the coins of Mariniana, like those of Paulina and Faustina the Elder, bear the omission of Augusta between Diva and the empress’s personal name in their legends.	Valerian (r. 253–260)	
—	Cornelia Gallonia (?)	c. 250s	Her existence is inferred from an inscription from Bulzi in Sardinia published in 2004, which names her as augusta and wife of Valerian. However, according to Heil and Eck, Cornelia Gallonia never existed, since it may stem from a confusion with Cornelia Salonina.	Valerian (r. 253–260)	
	Cornelia Salonina	253 – 268 (15 years)	Mother of Valerian II, Saloninus and Marinianus (consul 268). Fate unknown after Gallienus' death.	Gallienus (r. 253–268)	
	Sulpicia Dryantilla (usurper)	c. 260	Wife of the usurper Regalianus, who attempted to usurp power in Pannonia.	Regalianus (r. 260)	
	Ulpia Severina	270 – 275 (5 years)	Possibly a daughter of Ulpius Crinitus. Sometimes said to have been empress regnant between the death of Aurelian and the accession of Tacitus, but this has been disputed by modern historians.	Aurelian (r. 270–275)	
	Victoria (?) (mother)	c. 271 (as augusta)	Probably fictional.	Victorinus (r. 269–271)	
	Zenobia (usurper)	272	Ruler of the Palmyrene Empire in name of her infant son Vaballathus	Empress regnant of Palmyra	
	Magnia Urbica	283 – 285 (5 years)	Given the title Mater castrorum, senatus ac patriae.	Carinus (r. 283–285)	
—	Unknown name	283 – 284 (2 years)	Daughter of Aper the praetorian prefect.	Numerian (r. 283–284)	

== Dominate (284–476) ==
=== Tetrarchy (284–324) ===
Only Valeria received the title of augusta during the Tetrarchy, and only a few women did so in the Constantinian and Valentinianic dynasties.

Portrait	Name (Note: Empresses during the Tetrarchy often adopted their husband's nomen after their marriage. Diocletian's daughter Valeria thus became "Galeria Valeria" upon her marriage to Galerius.)	Tenure	Life details & notes	Emperor	Ref
	Prisca	20 November 284 – 1 May 305 (20 years, 5 months and 11 days)	A Christian, retired after the abdication of Diocletian. Exiled to Syria by Maximinus Daza and later executed by Licinius during the Civil wars of the Tetrarchy, probably in 315.	Diocletian (r. 284–305)	
	Eutropia	1 April 286 – 1 May 305 (19 years and 1 month, West)	Possibly the widow of Afranius Hannibalianus. Still alive in 325.	Maximian (r. 286–305)	
	Galeria Valeria	1 May 305 – May 311 (6 years, East)	Daughter of Diocletian and (probably) Prisca; married Galerius after his elevation as caesar in 293, styled as augusta and mater castrorum. Exiled alongside her mother by Maximinus Daza, and later executed by Licinius	Galerius (r. 305–311)	
	Flavia Maximiana Theodora	1 May 305 – 25 July 306 (1 year, 2 months and 24 days, West)	Daughter of Eutropia and (probably) Afranius Hannibalianus, step-daughter of Maximian.	Constantius I (r. 305–306)	
	Valeria Maximilla	28 October 306 – 28 October 312 (6 years, Italy)	Daughter of Galerius, married Maxentius c. 305. Her fate following Maxentius' death is unknown, but may have suffered damnatio memoriae.	Maxentius (r. 306–312)	
—	Unknown name	310 – 313 (?) (3 years, East)	Perhaps related to Galerius.	Maximinus II Daza (r. 310–313)	
	Flavia Julia Constantia	313 – 324 (11 years, East)	Half-sister of Constantine I. Lived at her brother's court following Licinius' and her son's execution.	Licinius (r. 308–324)	

=== Constantinian dynasty (306–363) ===
Portrait	Name	Tenure	Life details & notes	Emperor	Ref
—	Minervina	306 – 307 (?) (1 year?)	Referred as the wife of Constantine by the Panegyrici Latini VI, but called a concubine by Aurelius Victor and Zosimus. She died or was divorced by 307.	Constantine I (r. 306–337)	
	Flavia Maxima Fausta	March 307 – Summer 326 (19 years)	c. 290 (?) – Summer 326 (aged approx. 36) Daughter of Maximian and Eutropia, named augusta after Constantine's victory over Licinius in 324. Executed, possibly for adultery with her stepson, Crispus.	Constantine I (r. 306–337)	
	Flavia Julia Helena (mother)	324–330 (6 years, as augusta)	c. 250–330 (aged approx. 80) Mother of Constantine I and ex-wife or mistress of Constantius I.	Constantine I (r. 306–337)	
—	Flavia Valeria Constantina (?) (daughter)	335–354 (?) (19 years, as augusta)	Daughter of Constantine. Wife of Hannibalianus and later the caesar Gallus. Her appointment as augusta may be fictional.	Constantine I (r. 306–337)	
—	Unknown name	9 September 337 – April 340 (2 years and 7 months)	Obscure figure, married to Constantine II by 335 and alive at the time of his death. Perhaps a daughter of one of Constantine I's half-brothers.	Constantine II (r. 337–340)	
—	Unknown name	337 – 353 (16 years)	Nothing known.	Constantius II (r. 337–361)	
	Eusebia	c. 353 – c. 360 (about 7 years)	Probably a daughter of Eusebius (consul 347); supported Julian; died sometime before 361.	Constantius II (r. 337–361)	
—	Faustina	361 (a few months)	Joined Procopius (r. 365–366) during his brief rule in Constantinople.	Constantius II (r. 337–361)	
—	Justina	late 350 – 11 August 353 (3 years)	Daughter of governor Justus; married Magnentius as a young girl.	Magnentius (r. 350–353)	
	Helena	c. February – c. November 360 (9 months or less)	Daughter of Constantine I and Fausta; wrongly called "Constantina" in some sources. Died around Julian's accession as sole emperor.	Julian (r. 360–363)	
	Charito	27 June 363 – 17 February 364 (7 months and 21 days)	Daughter of the magister equitum Lucillianus, possibly alive as late as 380.	Jovian (r. 363–364)	

=== Valentinianic dynasty (364–383) ===
Portrait	Name	Tenure	Life details & notes	Emperor	Ref
	Marina Severa	364 – 370 (6 years)	Divorced and exiled. Later returned to court under her son Gratian.	Valentinian I (r. 364–375)	
—	Justina (second time)	c. 370 – 375 (c. 5 years)	Married Valentinian I after his divorce with Marina Severa. Mother of Valentinian II. During an invasion by Magnus Maximus, she and her son fled to Theodosius I who defeated Magnus Maximus and reinstalled them. Died around 388.	Valentinian I (r. 364–375)	
—	Domnica (Note: Kienast, Eck & Heil, p. 317, give her name as "Albia (?) Dominica", but does not elaborate. This name is not mentioned by the PLRE or other sources.)	28 March 364 – 9 August 378 (14 years, 4 months and 12 days)	Daughter of praetorian prefect Petronius. Defended Constantinople against the Goths after the death of Valens in the Battle of Adrianople.	Valens (r. 364–378)	
	Constantia	c. 374 – early 383 (c. 2 years and 7 months)	early 362 – early 383 (aged 21) Posthumous child of Constantius II and Faustina; alongside her mother Faustina, was present beside Procopius in 365 to ensure the loyalty of his troops.	Gratian (r. 375–383) (Note: Gratian was crowned co-emperor in 367.)	
—	Laeta	before 25 August 383 (a few months)	Daughter of Tisamene; supplied the city of Rome with food during the siege of Alaric I in 408.	Gratian (r. 375–383)	

=== Theodosian dynasty (379–457) ===
All empress, with the exceptions of Galla, "Elen", and Thermantia, received the title augusta.

Portrait	Name (Note: Empress after Aelia Flaccilla adopted "Aelia" as a title, which was then shown in their coinage.)	Tenure	Life details & notes	Emperor	Ref
	Aelia Flaccilla; Aelia Flavia Flaccilla (Note: Flaccilla is called "Flavia" in a few inscriptions. She probably adopted the name following the accession of her husband, who also used "Flavius" as part of his nomenclature. Emperors after the Constantinian dynasty were often addressed as "Flavius", but it was used as an honorific rather than a personal name.)	19 January 379 – early 386 (7 years)	Married Theodosius c. 376, died in 386.	Theodosius I (r. 379–395)	
—	Galla	386 – 394 (8 years)	Daughter of Valentinian I and Justina; died during childbirth.	Theodosius I (r. 379–395)	
—	Unknown name	25 August 383 – 28 August 388 (5 years and 3 days)	Known as "Saint Elen" in Welsh legend.	Magnus Maximus (r. 383–388)	
	Eudoxia	27 April 395 – 6 October 404 (9 years, 5 months and 9 days)	Daughter of the Frankish general Bauto; advised the emperor, and was involved in the downfall of Eutropius. Proclaimed augusta on 9 January 400 during the uprising of Gainas.	Arcadius (r. 395–408)	
	Maria	c. 398 – 407 (c. 9 years)	Daughter of the general Stilicho, died in 407.	Honorius (r. 395–423)	
	Thermantia; Aemilia Materna Thermantia	408 (a few months)	Daughter of Stilicho; banished by Honorius following Stilicho's execution in August 408. Died sometime before 30 July 415.	Honorius (r. 395–423)	
	Eudocia	7 June 421 – 28 July 450 (29 years, 1 month and 21 days)	c. 400 – 20 October 460 (aged approx. 60) Born as "Athenais", daughter of Leontius, a philosopher. Proclaimed augusta on 2 January 423. Departed from the court in the 440s following an estrangement with Theodosius. Left numerous writings.	Theodosius II (r. 408–450)	
	Galla Placidia	8 February – 2 September 421 (7 months lacking 6 days)	388 – 27 November 450 (aged approx. 72) Daughter of Theodosius I and Galla. Originally married the Visigothic king Athaulf, married Constantius on 1 January 417. After the instalment of her son Valentinian III as emperor, she became regent alongside Aetius. Died in 450.	Constantius III (r. 421)	
	Justa Grata Honoria (sister)	c. 437–450 (13 years, as augusta)	c. 418–450 (aged approx. 32) Daughter of Constantius III. Possibly exiled after an intrigue with Attila the Hun.	Valentinian III (r. 425–455)	
	Licinia Eudoxia	29 October 437 – 31 May 455 (17 years, 7 months and 2 days)	422 – c. 493 (aged approx. 71) Daughter of Theodosius II and Eudocia. Forced to marry Maximus after the murder of Valentinian. Taken to Africa after the sack of Rome, was freed in about 462.	Valentinian III (r. 425–455)	
	Licinia Eudoxia	29 October 437 – 31 May 455 (17 years, 7 months and 2 days)	422 – c. 493 (aged approx. 71) Daughter of Theodosius II and Eudocia. Forced to marry Maximus after the murder of Valentinian. Taken to Africa after the sack of Rome, was freed in about 462.	Petronius Maximus (r. 455)	
	Pulcheria	25 August 450 – July 453 (2 years and 10 months)	19 January 399 – July 453 (aged 55) Daughter of Arcadius and Eudoxia, proclaimed augusta and guardian of her younger brother Theodosius II on 4 July 414. Involved in the Councils of Ephesus and Chalcedon. Married Marcian after his election as emperor by Aspar.	Marcian (r. 450–457)	

=== Puppet emperors (west, 467–475) ===
Portrait	Name	Tenure	Life details & notes	Emperor	Ref
	Marcia Euphemia	12 April 467 – 11 July 472 (5 years and 3 months)	Only daughter of Marcian, who married her to Anthemius c. 453. Styled as augusta	Anthemius (r. 467–472)	
—	Alypia (?) (daughter)	467–472 (?) (as augusta)	On a coin depicting Euphemia and Alypia, they are shown wearing the typical Augusta vestments, so it is possible that both were appointed Augustae	Anthemius (r. 467–472)	
—	Placidia	April – 2 November 472 (7 months)	Daughter of Valentinian III and Licinia Eudoxia, married Olybrius in 454/454. Still alive c. 480.	Olybrius (r. 472)	
—	Unknown name	24 June 474 – 28 August 475 (1 year, 2 months and 4 days)	A relative of Empress Verina.	Julius Nepos (r. 474–475/80) (Note: Julius Nepos continued to claim the imperial title in exile until May 480. He was apparently recognized by Emperor Zeno, but held no real power.)	

== Later eastern empresses (457–1439) ==
During the later 'Byzantine' period, all empresses (unless noted) received the title augusta; whether it was still considered a formal title or just a synonym to "empress" is not known.

=== Leonid dynasty (457–515) ===
Portrait	Name	Tenure	Life details & notes	Emperor	Ref
	Verina	7 February 457 – 18 January 474 (16 years, 11 months and 11 days)	Sister of Basiliscus. Plotted against Emperor Zeno with Patricius, but was betrayed by Basiliscus. Her son-in-law Marcian rebelled in 479. After being held in captivity under Illus, she endorsed Leontius' usurpation in 484; she died during the ensuing war, probably in 484.	Leo I (r. 457–474)	
	Ariadne	29 January 474 – late 515 (39 years and a few months)	Daughter of Leo I and Verina, married Zeno in 466/467. Chose Anastasius as successor and married him immediately after Zeno's death. The third longest-reigning empress, after Helena Lekapene and Livia.	Zeno (r. 474–491)	
	Ariadne	29 January 474 – late 515 (39 years and a few months)	Daughter of Leo I and Verina, married Zeno in 466/467. Chose Anastasius as successor and married him immediately after Zeno's death. The third longest-reigning empress, after Helena Lekapene and Livia.	Anastasius I (r. 491–518)	
	Zenonis	9 January 475 – August 476 (1 year and 7 months)	Died alongside her husband after Zeno's restoration.	Basiliscus (r. 475–476)	

=== Justinian dynasty (east, 518–602) ===
Portrait	Name	Tenure	Life details & notes	Emperor	Ref
	Euphemia	10 July 518 – before August 527 (6 years or less)	Formerly named "Lupicina". According to Procopius's Secret History, originally a slave of barbarian origin.	Justin I (r. 518–527)	
	Theodora	1 April 527 – 28 June 548 (21 years, 2 months and 27 days)	c. 497 – 28 June 548 (aged approx. 50) Daughter of Acacius; aunt of Sophia; married Justinian c. 524 and became one of his main advisers.	Justinian I (r. 527–565)	
	Sophia	14 November 565 – 5 October 578 (12 years, 10 months and 21 days)	Niece of Theodora. Became regent alongside Tiberius II after Justin's mental collapse in 573; was pushed out after plotting against Tiberius after Justin's death. She was present in Maurice's court and still alive by 601.	Justin II (r. 565–578)	
	(Ino) Anastasia	26 September 578 – 14 August 582 (3 years, 10 months and 19 days)	Had already been a widow before marrying Tiberius sometime before his appointment as caesar in 574. Initially opposed by Sophia, she later became the mother-in-law of Maurice and died sometime after, perhaps in 593.	Tiberius II Constantine (r. 578–582)	
	Constantina	13 August 582 – 27 November 602 (20 years, 3 months and 14 days)	Daughter of Tiberius II and Anastasia. Married caesar Maurice on Tiberius' deathbed. Exiled after Maurice's execution, tried to plot against Phocas but was eventually killed in 605.	Maurice (r. 582–602)	
	Leontia	23 November 602 – 5 October 610 (?) (7 years, 10 months and 12 days)	Daughter of Sergius. Her fate after Phocas' execution is unknown.	Phocas (r. 602–610)	

=== Heraclian dynasty (610–695) ===
Portrait	Name	Tenure	Life details & notes	Emperor	Ref
	Fabia Eudokia; Ευδοκία	5 October 610 – 13 August 612 (1 year, 10 months and 8 days)	Daughter of Rogas of Libya; died of epilepsy.	Heraclius (r. 610–641)	
—	Eudoxia Epiphania (daughter)	4 October 611 – ? (as augusta)	Daughter of Heraclius and Fabia Eudokia.	Heraclius (r. 610–641)	
	Martina; Μαρτίνα	c. 613 – 11 February 641 (about 7 years)	Daughter of Martinus; niece of Heraclius, which led to controversies around her marriage. Became regent of her young son Heraclonas after Constantine's death. Was soon deposed, mutilated, and exiled by Valentinus in favor of Constans II, who was also a minor at the time.	Heraclius (r. 610–641)	
—	Augustina & Martina (daughters)	4 July 638 – ? (unknown tenure as augustae)	Crowned augustae alongside their mother Martina the Elder.	Heraclius (r. 610–641)	
—	Gregoria; Γρηγορία	early 630 – 25 May 641 (11 years)	Daughter of Nicetas (cousin of Heraclius), married Constantine in early 630 (or late 629). Regent during the early reign of her son Constans II. Not recorded as augusta	Constantine III Heraclius (r. 641) (Note: Constantine III was crowned co-emperor in 613.)	
—	Fausta; Φαύστα	642 – 15 July 668 (26 years)	Possibly a daughter of Valentinus, usurper in 644.	Constans II (r. 641–668)	
—	Anastasia; Αναστασία	September 668 (?) – July 685 (16 years and 6 months?)	Still alive during the reign of Philippicus; not recorded as augusta	Constantine IV (r. 668–685)	
—	Eudokia; Ευδοκία	c. 685 – c. 695 (10 years?)	Possibly dead by 695, not recorded as augusta	Justinian II (r. 685–695; 705–711)	

=== Twenty Years' Anarchy (695–717) ===
Portrait	Name	Tenure	Life details & notes	Emperor	Ref
—	Unknown name	c. 695 – 698 (?) (c. 3 years)	Nothing known	Leontius (r. 695–698)	
—	Unknown name	c. 698 – 705 (?) (c. 7 years)	Nothing known	Tiberius III (r. 698–705)	
—	Theodora of Khazaria; Θεοδώρα	c. 21 August 705 – 4 November 711 (c. 6 years, 2 months and 14 days)	The first foreign-born empress. Sister of Busir, Khagan of Khazaria. Became Justinian's second wife during his exile in 703; crowned (Note: Empresses were proclaimed augusta at their coronation.) alongside her son Tiberius in 705.	Justinian II (r. 685–695; 705–711)	
—	Unknown name	c. 711 – 713 (?) (c. 2 years)	Nothing known	Philippicus (r. 711–713)	
—	Irene; Ειρήνη	c. 713 – 715 (c. 2 years)	Little information recorded other than her name	Anastasius II (r. 713–715)	
—	Unknown name	c. 715 – 717 (?) (c. 2 years)	Nothing known	Theodosius III (r. 715–717)	

=== Isaurian dynasty (717–802) ===
Portrait	Name	Tenure	Life details & notes	Emperor	Ref
—	Maria; Μαρία	25 March 717 – 18 June 741 (?) (24 years, 2 months and 24 days?)	Crowned on 25 December 718. Mother of Constantine V	Leo III (r. 717–741)	
—	Tzitzak Irene; Εἰρήνη	733 – 750 (17 years)	Daughter of khagan Bihar of Khazaria. Opposed the iconoclasm of her husband; died shortly after Leo IV's birth	Constantine V (r. 741–775) (Note: Constantine V was crowned co-emperor in 720.)	
—	Maria; Μαρία	c. 751 – 752 (c. 1 year)	Died soon after her marriage.	Constantine V (r. 741–775)	
—	Eudokia; Ευδοκία	c. 753 – 14 September 775 (?) (c. 22 years?)	Already married by November 764, crowned on 1 April 769; fate unknown.	Constantine V (r. 741–775)	
—	Anna; Άννα	June 741 – 2 November 743 (2 years and 5 months)	Daughter of Leo III, married Artabasdos in 717. Banished after her husband's failed coup; not recorded as augusta	Artabasdos (r. 741–743)	
	Irene of Athens; Εἰρήνη	3 November 769 – 31 October 802 (33 years lacking 3 days)	c. 752 – 9 August 803 (aged approx. 51) A member of the Sarantapechos family; crowned on 17 December 769. Became de facto ruler after Leo's death as her son's regent. Ended the First iconoclasm with the Second Council of Nicaea in 787. She took full power after deposing and blinding her son on 19 August 797. She was herself deposed and banished in 802, later dying of natural causes.	Leo IV (r. 775–780) (Note: Leo IV was crowned co-emperor in 751.)	
	Irene of Athens; Εἰρήνη	3 November 769 – 31 October 802 (33 years lacking 3 days)	c. 752 – 9 August 803 (aged approx. 51) A member of the Sarantapechos family; crowned on 17 December 769. Became de facto ruler after Leo's death as her son's regent. Ended the First iconoclasm with the Second Council of Nicaea in 787. She took full power after deposing and blinding her son on 19 August 797. She was herself deposed and banished in 802, later dying of natural causes.	Co-empress 792–797 (Note: She acted as de facto empress-regnant during almost all of Constantine VI's reign. She was banished in December 791, but was recalled and proclaimed empress (and in practice co-ruler) a month later, on 15 January 792.)	
	Irene of Athens; Εἰρήνη	3 November 769 – 31 October 802 (33 years lacking 3 days)	c. 752 – 9 August 803 (aged approx. 51) A member of the Sarantapechos family; crowned on 17 December 769. Became de facto ruler after Leo's death as her son's regent. Ended the First iconoclasm with the Second Council of Nicaea in 787. She took full power after deposing and blinding her son on 19 August 797. She was herself deposed and banished in 802, later dying of natural causes.	Empress regnant 797–802	
—	Maria of Amnia; Μαρία	November 788 – January 795 (6 years and 2 months)	Grand-daughter of Saint Philaretos; born c. 773. She was forced to become a nun. Died sometime after 824.	Constantine VI (r. 780–797)	
—	Theodote; Θεοδότη	September 795 – 19 August 797 (1 year and 11 months)	Cousin of Saint Theodore the Studite; originally a koubikoularia, she was crowned in August 795. Deposed by Irene.	Constantine VI (r. 780–797)	

=== Nikephorian dynasty (802–813) ===
Portrait	Name	Tenure	Life details & notes	Emperor	Ref
	Unknown name (Note: The name and background of Nikephoros I's wife is not given in any primary source. Some modern historians mistakenly call her Prokopia, out of confusion with her daughter (and later also empress) Prokopia.)	—	Unmentioned in literary sources, possibly dead before Nikephoros became emperor	Nikephoros I (r. 802–811)	
—	Theophano of Athens; Θεοφανώ	20 December 807 – 2 October 811 (3 years, 9 months and 12 days)	A relative of Irene of Athens, considered as a candidate for the throne after Staurakios' defeat at the Battle of Pliska, retired as a nun alongside him; not recorded as augusta	Staurakios (r. 811)	
—	Prokopia; Προκοπία	2 October 811 – 11 July 813 (1 year, 9 months and 9 days)	Daughter of Nikephoros I and sister of emperor Staurakios; retired as a nun	Michael I Rangabe (r. 811–813)	
	Theodosia; Θεοδοσία	11 July 813 – 25 December 820 (7 years, 5 months and 14 days)	Daughter of Arsaber, patrikios and rival emperor in 808. Become a nun after the murder of her husband; retained several of her privileges	Leo V (r. 813–820)	

=== Amorian dynasty (820–867) ===
Portrait	Name	Tenure	Life details & notes	Emperor	Ref
—	Thekla; Θέκλα	25 December 820 – c. 824 (c. 4 years)	Daughter of the rebel Bardanes Tourkos. Died some years after Michael's accession.	Michael II (r. 820–829)	
—	Euphrosyne; Εὐφροσύνη	c. 824 – 2 October 829 (c. 6 years)	Daughter of Constantine VI and Maria, became a nun after the fall of Irene, but was later recalled and married Michael, perhaps at the age of 50. Still alive by 836.	Michael II (r. 820–829)	
	Theodora the Armenian; Θεοδώρα	5 June 830 – 20 January 842 (11 years, 7 months and 15 days)	c. 815 – c. 867 (aged approx. 52) Became de facto ruler on 20 January 842, as regent of her infant son Michael III, alongside Theoktistos. Ended the Second iconoclasm in 843. Deposed and exiled by her son after forcing him to marry Eudokia Dekapolitissa. They both reconciled shortly before Michael's death.	Theophilos (r. 829–842)	
	Anna & Anastasia (daughters)	c. 830s (unknown tenure as augustae)	Daughters of Theophilos and Theodora, named augustae alongside their sister Thekla.	Theophilos (r. 829–842)	
	Thekla the Younger; Θέκλα	842 – 15 March 856 (14 years)	Daughter of Theophilos and Theodora, named augusta alongside her sisters Anna and Anastasia. Appeared to have been associated to the imperial office with an even higher status than Michael. She later became a mistress to Basil I, but was sidelined after he married.	Co-empress 842–856	
	Eudokia Dekapolitissa; Ευδοκία Δεκαπολίτισσα	855 – 24 September 867 (12 years)	Forced to marry Michael III, who was in love with Eudokia Ingerina, by Theodora and Theoktistos; fate unknown.	Michael III (r. 842–867)	

=== Macedonian dynasty (867–1056) ===
Portrait	Name	Tenure	Life details & notes	Emperor	Ref
	Eudokia Ingerina; Ευδοκία Ιγγερίνα	26 May 866 – 882 (16 years)	c. 840 – 882 (aged approx. 42) Daughter of Inger (senator); former lover of Michael III, who married her to Basil shortly before his coronation as co-emperor; not recorded as augusta	Basil I (r. 867–886) (Note: Basil I was crowned co-emperor in 866.)	
	Theophano Martinakia; Θεοφανώ Μαρτινιακή	883 – 893 (14 years)	c. 867 – 10 November 897 (aged approx. 30) Daughter of Constantine Martinakios; retired to a monastery and died in 897.	Leo VI (r. 886–912) (Note: Leo VI was crowned co-emperor in 870.)	
—	Zoe Zaoutzaina; Ζωὴ Ζαούτζαινα	late 898 – early 899 (1 year and 8 months)	Possibly a lover of Leo, said to have poisoned her former husband, Theodoros Guniatzitzes.	Leo VI (r. 886–912)	
—	Anna of Constantinople (daughter)	c. May 900 (as augusta)	In May 900, Leo VI had his daughter Anna crowned augusta, however she was soon sent to the West to marry Louis III.	Leo VI (r. 886–912)	
—	Eudokia Baïana; Εὐδοκία Βαϊανή	Summer 900 – 12 April 901 (1 year)	Married Leo after the death of Zoe. Died during childbirth	Leo VI (r. 886–912)	
	Zoe Karbonopsina; Ζωὴ	9 January 906 – 11 May 912 (5 years, 4 months and 2 days)	A relative of writer Theophanes and general Himerios, originally a concubine of Leo. She was expelled after Leo's death, but returned and deposed the regency of Patriarch Nicholas in February/March 914, ruling on behalf of her son Constantine VII. She was sidelined after the rise of Romanos I in 919 and was forced to become a nun.	Leo VI (r. 886–912)	
—	Unknown name	c. 912 – 913 (?)	Nothing known	Alexander (r. 912–913)	
	Helena Lekapene; Ἑλένη Λεκαπηνή	4 May 919 – 9 November 959 (40 years, 6 months and 5 days)	April 907 – 19 September 961 (aged 54) Daughter of Romanos I and Theodora, married shortly after Romanos' coup; crowned after Theodora's death. Became very influential in court until Constantine became sole ruler (945), later dying of an illness. The second longest-reigning empress.	Constantine VII (r. 913–959)	
—	Theodora; Θεοδώρα	17 December 920 – 20 February 922 (1 year, 2 months and 3 days)	The second wife of Romanos, married c. 907; crowned on 6 January 921.	Romanos I Lekapenos (r. 919–944)	
—	Sophia	20 May 921 – August 931	Daughter of the patrician Niketas	Christopher Lekapenos (r. 921–931)	
—	Anna Gabala	933 – 27 January 945	Daughter of a certain Gabalas.	Stephen Lekapenos (r. 924–945)	
—	Helen	939 – 14 January 940	First wife of Constantine Lekapenos.	Constantine Lekapenos (r. 924–945)	
—	Theophano Mamas	2 February 940 – 27 January 945	Second wife of Constantine Lekapenos.	Constantine Lekapenos (r. 924–945)	
	Bertha / Eudokia; Εὐδοκία	945 – 949 (4 years)	Daughter of Hugh of Italy, originally named Bertha. Betrothed to Romanos II in September 944, she died in 949, aged no more than 10 years old. She is not recorded as augusta.	Romanos II (r. 959–963) (Note: Romanos II was crowned co-emperor in 945.)	
	Anastaso Theophano; Θεοφανώ	955/6 – 11 December 969 (13–14 years) (Note: She stopped being empress for 6 months in 963, between the death of Romanos II (15 March) and her marriage to Nikephoros II (20 September).)	c. 940 – c. 980 (?) (aged approx. 40) Daughter of Krateros and Maria. Married Nikephoros II on 20 September 963, shortly after his coup. Skylitzes accuses her of poisoning Romanos, but this seems to be a later invention, as Leo the Deacon states that he died of an illness. She did, however, conspire with John Tzimiskes to murder Nikephoros. She is last mentioned in 978.	Romanos II (r. 959–963) (Note: Romanos II was crowned co-emperor in 945.)	
	Anastaso Theophano; Θεοφανώ	955/6 – 11 December 969 (13–14 years)	c. 940 – c. 980 (?) (aged approx. 40) Daughter of Krateros and Maria. Married Nikephoros II on 20 September 963, shortly after his coup. Skylitzes accuses her of poisoning Romanos, but this seems to be a later invention, as Leo the Deacon states that he died of an illness. She did, however, conspire with John Tzimiskes to murder Nikephoros. She is last mentioned in 978.	Nikephoros II Phokas (r. 963–969)	
—	Theodora; Θεοδώρα	November 970 – 10 January 976 (?) (5 years and 2 months)	Daughter of Constantine VII and Helena Lekapene; born in the late 930s.	John I Tzimiskes (r. 969–976)	
—	Helena; Ελένη	c. 976 – c. 989 (?) (about 13 years?)	Daughter of Alypius; not recorded as augusta.	Constantine VIII (r. 1025–1028) (Note: Constantine VIII was crowned co-emperor in 962.)	
—	Helena (ex-wife)	c. 1028 – ? (as sebaste)	To avoid her husband losing his eyes, she retired to a convent under the monastic name of Maria. Romanos III gave her the title of sebaste, the Greek for augusta, and made extravagant charitable donations on her death.	Romanos III Argyros (r. 1028–34)	
	Zoe Porphyrogenita; Ζωὴ	12 November 1028 – 1050 (22 years)	c. 978 – 1050 (aged approx. 72) Daughter of Constantine VIII, probably ordered the murder of Romanos III. Ruled in her own right alongside Theodora from Michael V's deposition until her marriage to Constantine IX (21 April–11 June 1042). After this she had little involvement in politics, later dying of natural causes.	Romanos III Argyros (r. 1028–34)	
	Zoe Porphyrogenita; Ζωὴ	12 November 1028 – 1050 (22 years)	c. 978 – 1050 (aged approx. 72) Daughter of Constantine VIII, probably ordered the murder of Romanos III. Ruled in her own right alongside Theodora from Michael V's deposition until her marriage to Constantine IX (21 April–11 June 1042). After this she had little involvement in politics, later dying of natural causes.	Michael IV (r. 1034–1041)	
	Zoe Porphyrogenita; Ζωὴ	12 November 1028 – 1050 (22 years)	c. 978 – 1050 (aged approx. 72) Daughter of Constantine VIII, probably ordered the murder of Romanos III. Ruled in her own right alongside Theodora from Michael V's deposition until her marriage to Constantine IX (21 April–11 June 1042). After this she had little involvement in politics, later dying of natural causes.	Empress regnant 1042	
	Zoe Porphyrogenita; Ζωὴ	12 November 1028 – 1050 (22 years)	c. 978 – 1050 (aged approx. 72) Daughter of Constantine VIII, probably ordered the murder of Romanos III. Ruled in her own right alongside Theodora from Michael V's deposition until her marriage to Constantine IX (21 April–11 June 1042). After this she had little involvement in politics, later dying of natural causes.	Constantine IX Monomachos (r. 1042–1055)	
—	Maria Skleraina (mistress)	1042 – c. 1045 (as sebaste)	She was titled sebaste, the Greek for augusta, and was called empress (despoina).	Constantine IX Monomachos (r. 1042–1055)	
—	Irene of Alania (?) (mistress)	c. 1051 (as sebaste)	A certain "Alan princess", the mistress of Constantine IX, was titled sebaste and performed the part of empress. According to Cyril Toumanoff, she was Irene, the daughter of the Georgian prince Demetrius and later wife of sebastokrator Isaac Komnenos.	Constantine IX Monomachos (r. 1042–1055)	
	Theodora Porphyrogenita; Θεοδώρα	21 April 1042 – 31 August 1056 (14 years, 4 months and 10 days)	c. 980 – 31 August 1056 (aged approx. 76) Sister of Zoe, proclaimed co-empress during the revolt that deposed Michael V in 1042. Sidelined after Zoë's marriage to Constantine IX, returned as empress regnant after the latter's death on 11 January 1055. Died of natural causes shortly after appointing Michael VI as her successor.	Empress regnant 1042	
	Theodora Porphyrogenita; Θεοδώρα	21 April 1042 – 31 August 1056 (14 years, 4 months and 10 days)	c. 980 – 31 August 1056 (aged approx. 76) Sister of Zoe, proclaimed co-empress during the revolt that deposed Michael V in 1042. Sidelined after Zoë's marriage to Constantine IX, returned as empress regnant after the latter's death on 11 January 1055. Died of natural causes shortly after appointing Michael VI as her successor.	Co-empress 1042–1055	
	Theodora Porphyrogenita; Θεοδώρα	21 April 1042 – 31 August 1056 (14 years, 4 months and 10 days)	c. 980 – 31 August 1056 (aged approx. 76) Sister of Zoe, proclaimed co-empress during the revolt that deposed Michael V in 1042. Sidelined after Zoë's marriage to Constantine IX, returned as empress regnant after the latter's death on 11 January 1055. Died of natural causes shortly after appointing Michael VI as her successor.	Empress regnant 1055–1056	
—	Catherine of Bulgaria; Αἰκατερίνη	1 September 1057 – 22 November 1059 (2 years, 2 months and 21 days)	Daughter of Ivan Vladislav of Bulgaria. Retired to a monastery with the monastic name "Xene"	Isaac I Komnenos (r. 1057–1059)	

=== Doukas dynasty (1059–1081) ===
Portrait	Name	Tenure	Life details & notes	Emperor	Ref
	Eudokia Makrembolitissa; Ευδοκία Μακρεμβολίτισσα	23 November 1059 – November 1071 (12 years)	Daughter of John Makrembolites and niece of Patriarch Michael I, born c. 1030, married Constantine c. 1049; ruler in 1067 with her sons Michael VII and Konstantios between Constantine's death (23 November) and her marriage to Romanos (1 January). She resumed her rule in October 1071, after Romanos' fall, but was expelled and forced to become a nun. She was later recalled by Nikephoros III in 1078.	Constantine X Doukas (r. 1059–1067)	
	Eudokia Makrembolitissa; Ευδοκία Μακρεμβολίτισσα	23 November 1059 – November 1071 (12 years)	Daughter of John Makrembolites and niece of Patriarch Michael I, born c. 1030, married Constantine c. 1049; ruler in 1067 with her sons Michael VII and Konstantios between Constantine's death (23 November) and her marriage to Romanos (1 January). She resumed her rule in October 1071, after Romanos' fall, but was expelled and forced to become a nun. She was later recalled by Nikephoros III in 1078.	Empress regnant 1067 (Note: Some historians regard Eudokia as an empress regnant, while others consider her as a regent.)	
	Eudokia Makrembolitissa; Ευδοκία Μακρεμβολίτισσα	23 November 1059 – November 1071 (12 years)	Daughter of John Makrembolites and niece of Patriarch Michael I, born c. 1030, married Constantine c. 1049; ruler in 1067 with her sons Michael VII and Konstantios between Constantine's death (23 November) and her marriage to Romanos (1 January). She resumed her rule in October 1071, after Romanos' fall, but was expelled and forced to become a nun. She was later recalled by Nikephoros III in 1078.	Romanos IV Diogenes (r. 1068–1071)	
	Eudokia Makrembolitissa; Ευδοκία Μακρεμβολίτισσα	23 November 1059 – November 1071 (12 years)	Daughter of John Makrembolites and niece of Patriarch Michael I, born c. 1030, married Constantine c. 1049; ruler in 1067 with her sons Michael VII and Konstantios between Constantine's death (23 November) and her marriage to Romanos (1 January). She resumed her rule in October 1071, after Romanos' fall, but was expelled and forced to become a nun. She was later recalled by Nikephoros III in 1078.	Empress regnant 1071	
	Maria of Alania; Μαρία	1066 / 1071 – 1 April 1078 (7–11 years)	c. 1052 / 1056 – 1118 (aged 62–66) Daughter of Bagrat IV of Georgia. Married Nikephoros shortly after the deposition of Michael VII in April 1078. Spent her last days in a Georgian monastery.	Michael VII Doukas (r. 1071–1078) (Note: Michael VII was crowned co-emperor in 1060.)	
	Maria of Alania; Μαρία	1066 / 1071 – 1 April 1078 (7–11 years)	c. 1052 / 1056 – 1118 (aged 62–66) Daughter of Bagrat IV of Georgia. Married Nikephoros shortly after the deposition of Michael VII in April 1078. Spent her last days in a Georgian monastery.	Nikephoros III Botaneiates (r. 1078–1081)	

=== Komnenos dynasty (1081–1185) ===
Portrait	Name	Tenure	Life details & notes	Emperor	Ref
	Irene Doukaina; Ειρήνη Δούκαινα	1 April 1081 – 15 August 1118 (37 years, 4 months and 14 days)	c. 1066 – 19 February 1138 (aged approx. 72) Daughter of Andronikos Doukas (cousin of Michael VII). Married Alexios c. 1078, crowned on 11 April 1081. Forced to retire to a monastery after the failed plot of her daughter Anna Komnene and her son-in-law Nikephoros Bryennios.	Alexios I Komnenos (r. 1081–1118)	
—	Anna Dalassene (mother)	April 1081 – 1 November 1100/02 (19–21 years, as despoina)	c. 1025 – 1 November 1100/02 (aged approx. 75–77) As the mother of Alexios I, she was awarded the title of empress (despoina). Greatly involved in administration, although she later retired to a monastery.	Alexios I Komnenos (r. 1081–1118)	
	Irene of Hungary; Ειρήνη	1104 – 13 August 1134 (30 years)	Daughter of Ladislaus I of Hungary, born as "Piroska". Married with John in 1104.	John II Komnenos (r. 1118–1143) (Note: John II was crowned co-emperor in 1092.)	
—	Dobrodeia of Kiev	c. 1122 – 16 November 1131 (c. 9 years)	Daughter of Mstislav I of Kiev.	Alexios Komnenos (r. 1119–1142) (Note: Alexios Komnenos was crowned co-emperor in 1119.)	
—	Bertha / Irene of Sulzbach; Ειρήνη	1146 – 1159 / 1160 (13–14 years)	Daughter of Berengar II of Sulzbach and sister-in-law of emperor Conrad III of Germany.	Manuel I Komnenos (r. 1143–1180)	
	Maria Komnene (daughter)	March 1152 – July 1182 (as augusta)	According to Cinnamus, she was given the title augusta at her birth.	Manuel I Komnenos (r. 1143–1180)	
	Maria of Antioch; Μαρία	25 December 1161 – 24 September 1180 (18 years and 9 months)	1140s – late 1182 (aged approx. 35–40) Daughter of Raymond of Poitiers. Became a nun after Manuel's death under the name "Xene", but acted as de facto ruler as the regent of Alexios II. She was executed after the coup of Andronikos I.	Manuel I Komnenos (r. 1143–1180)	
	Agnes / Anna of France; Άννα	2 March 1180 – 12 September 1185 (5 years, 6 months and 10 days) (Note: She stopped being empress for a few months in 1183.)	Daughter of Louis VII of France, born in 1171. Forced to marry Andronikos I, who was over 60, shortly after the murder of Alexios II in September 1183. She became a subject of the Latin Empire after the sack of Constantinople in 1204 and married Theodore Branas. Not recorded as augusta.	Alexios II Komnenos (r. 1180–1183)	
	Agnes / Anna of France; Άννα	2 March 1180 – 12 September 1185 (5 years, 6 months and 10 days)	Daughter of Louis VII of France, born in 1171. Forced to marry Andronikos I, who was over 60, shortly after the murder of Alexios II in September 1183. She became a subject of the Latin Empire after the sack of Constantinople in 1204 and married Theodore Branas. Not recorded as augusta.	Andronikos I Komnenos (r. 1183–1185)	

=== Angelos dynasty (1185–1204) ===
Picture	Name	Tenure	Life details & notes	Emperor	Ref
—	Margaret of Hungary; Μαρία	early 1186 – 8 April 1195 (9 years) 19 July 1203 – 27 Jan. 1204 (6 months and 8 days)	Daughter of Béla III of Hungary; born in 1175. Married Crusader Boniface following the Sack of Constantinople, becoming queen of the Kingdom of Thessalonica. Not recorded as augusta	Isaac II Angelos (r. 1185–1195; 1203–1204)	
	Euphrosyne Doukaina Kamatera; Ευφροσύνη Δούκαινα Καματηρά	8 April 1195 – 18 July 1203 (8 years, 3 months and 10 days)	Daughter of Andronikos Kamateros and relative of caesar John Doukas and the Komnenoi. Effectively ruled the Empire on behalf of her husband. She was captured by the Crusaders in 1204, but was later released in 1209/10.	Alexios III Angelos (r. 1195–1203)	
—	Irene Angelina (daughter)	Spring 1199 – ? (as basilissa)	She was proclaimed empress (basilissa) when she married Alexios Palaiologos.	Alexios III Angelos (r. 1195–1203)	
—	Eudokia Angelina; Ευδοκία Αγγελίνα	c. 1204	Daughter of Alexios III Angelos.	Alexios V Doukas (r. 1204)	

=== Laskaris dynasty (1205–1258; Nicaea) ===
Note: Roman rule in Constantinople was interrupted with the capture of the city by the Fourth Crusade in 1204. Though the crusaders created a new line of Latin emperors in the city, modern historians recognize the line of emperors of the Laskaris dynasty, reigning in Empire of Nicaea, as the legitimate Roman emperors during this period as the Nicene Empire eventually retook Constantinople. For the other lines of empresses, see List of empresses of the Byzantine successor states.

Irene Laskarina is called augusta on her seal, but it is not known if the honorific was used by other empresses too.

Picture	Name	Tenure	Life details & notes	Emperor	Ref
—	Anna Komnene Angelina; Άννα Κομνηνή Αγγελίνα	1205 – c. 1212 (7 years or less)	Daughter of Alexios III and Euphrosyne; died a few years after the marriage.	Theodore I Laskaris (r. 1205–1221)	
—	Philippa of Armenia; Φιλίππα	1214 – 1216 (2 years)	Cousin of Leo I of Armenia. A troubled marriage that ended in divorce and with Theodore even disinheriting his son.	Theodore I Laskaris (r. 1205–1221)	
—	Maria of Courtenay; Μαρία	1219 – November 1221 (2 years)	Daughter of Latin emperor Peter. Became regent of her younger brother Baldwin II as Latin empress in 1228, but died shortly after.	Theodore I Laskaris (r. 1205–1221)	
	Irene Laskarina; Ειρήνη Κομνηνή (Λασκαρίνα)	December 1221 – Summer 1240 (19 years)	Daughter of Theodore I and Anna Komnene Angelina. She married Andronikos Palaiologos in February 1216, but he died shortly after. Irene should have married John very soon after, for Theodore II was born in 1221. She had an accident after his birth and retired under the monastic name "Eugenia".	John III Vatatzes (r. 1221–1254)	
—	Anna of Hohenstaufen; Άννα	c. 1240 – 3 November 1254 (approx. 14 years)	Daughter of Frederick II, Holy Roman Emperor, born as "Constance". Married John sometime before May 1241; died in the Kingdom of Aragon (Spain) in 1307.	John III Vatatzes (r. 1221–1254)	
—	Elena Asenina of Bulgaria; Ἑλένη	Spring 1235 – 1252 (17 years)	Daughter of Ivan Asen II of Bulgaria, born c. 1224. Theodore was most probably proclaimed emperor during the marriage.	Theodore II Laskaris (r. 1254–1258) (Note: Theodore II was proclaimed co-emperor in 1235, but was never crowned.)	

=== Palaiologos dynasty (1259–1439) ===
The honorific augusta appears on the seals of Theodora, Yolande-Irene, Rita-Maria and Anna of Savoy, as well as on a miniature depicting Helena Dragaš. Given that no seals or documents of other empresses have survived, it is not known if all of them used the title, although it's most likely they did.

Picture	Name (Note: Some Palaiologan empresses displayed over-complicated surnames, probably as an imitation of their husband's (although theirs were justified by their long ancestry, see Family tree of Byzantine emperors). The full surname of the Palaiologan emperors was "Doukas Angelos Komnenos Palaiologos".)	Tenure	Life details & notes	Emperor	Ref
	Theodora Palaiologina; Θεοδώρα Δούκαινα Κομνηνή Παλαιολογίνα	1 January 1259 – 11 December 1282 (23 years and 10 days)	Granddaughter of Isaac Doukas Vatatzes, brother of Nicaean emperor John III. Married Michael in 1253/4, crowned again in Constantinople after its reconquest in 1261. Died on 4 March 1303	Michael VIII Palaiologos (r. 1259–1282)	
—	Anna of Hungary; Άννα Παλαιολογίνα	8 November 1272 –1281 (9 years)	c. 1260 – 1281 (aged approx. 21) Daughter of Stephen V of Hungary, also a great-granddaughter of Theodore I Laskaris through her mother.	Andronikos II Palaiologos (r. 1282–1328) (Note: Andronikos II was crowned co-emperor on 8 November 1272.)	
	Yolande / Irene of Montferrat; Ειρήνη Κομνηνή Δούκαινα Παλαιολογίνα	1288 / 1289 – 1317 (28–29 years)	1272/1273 – 1317 (aged 44 or 45) Daughter of William VII of Montferrat and granddaughter of Alfonso X of Castile. Proposed the idea of splitting the realm between her sons, but this was rejected by Andronikos. Retired to Thessalonica, where she set up her own court.	Andronikos II Palaiologos (r. 1282–1328)	
	Yolande / Irene of Montferrat; Ειρήνη Κομνηνή Δούκαινα Παλαιολογίνα	1288 / 1289 – 1317 (28–29 years)	1272/1273 – 1317 (aged 44 or 45) Daughter of William VII of Montferrat and granddaughter of Alfonso X of Castile. Proposed the idea of splitting the realm between her sons, but this was rejected by Andronikos. Retired to Thessalonica, where she set up her own court.	Empress regnant in Thessalonica 1303–1317 (Note: During the last years of the Empire, the territory of Thessalonica was effectively ruled as separate realm from Constantinople. Two empresses, Irene and Anna, took residence there, even having their own courts and ruling as de facto empresses regnant. Anna notably ruled in Thessalonica in opposition to John VI Kantakouzenos, who later recognized her portion of the empire.)	
—	Irene Choumnaina (daughter-in-law)	1303 – c. 1355 (as basilissa)	As the wife of John Palaiologos, she was entitled empress (basilissa).	Andronikos II Palaiologos (r. 1282–1328)	
	Rita / Maria of Armenia; Μαρία Δούκαινα Παλαιολογίνα	1296 – 12 October 1320 (24 years)	Daughter of Leo II of Armenia. Became a nun and died on June/July 1333 under the monastic name "Xene".	Michael IX Palaiologos (r. 1294–1320)	
—	Irene of Brunswick; Ειρήνη Παλαιολογίνα	23 October 1317 – 16 August 1324 (6 years, 10 months less 7 days)	c. 1293 – 16 August 1324 (aged approx. 31) Daughter of Henry I of Brunswick-Grubenhagen. Died of an illness on her way back to Constantinople.	Andronikos III Palaiologos (r. 1328–1341) (Note: Andronikos III was proclaimed co-emperor around 1310, but not crowned until 1325.)	
	Anna of Savoy; Άννα Παλαιολογίνα	October 1326 – 15 June 1341 (14 years and 8 months) 1351 – 1365 (14 years, in Thessalonica)	c. 1306 – 1365 (aged approx. 58–59) Daughter of Amadeus V of Savoy. Became de facto ruler after Andronikos' death, as regent of the infant John V. The regency was overthrown by John VI Kantakouzenos in February 1347, but she set up her own court at Thessalonica. Died years later under the monastic name "Anastasia".	Andronikos III Palaiologos (r. 1328–1341)	
	Anna of Savoy; Άννα Παλαιολογίνα	October 1326 – 15 June 1341 (14 years and 8 months) 1351 – 1365 (14 years, in Thessalonica)	c. 1306 – 1365 (aged approx. 58–59) Daughter of Amadeus V of Savoy. Became de facto ruler after Andronikos' death, as regent of the infant John V. The regency was overthrown by John VI Kantakouzenos in February 1347, but she set up her own court at Thessalonica. Died years later under the monastic name "Anastasia".	Empress regnant in Thessalonica 1351–1365	
—	Irene Asenina; Εἰρήνη Καντακουζηνή (Ἀσανίνα)	8 February 1347 – 10 December 1354 (7 years, 10 months and 2 days)	Daughter of Andronikos Asen and granddaughter of Irene Palaiologina, married John in 1318, proclaimed empress alongside him in October 1341. She had an active role in military affairs, even commanding the defenses of Constantinople twice. She retired to a monastery alongside her husband under the name "Eugenia", dying sometime before 1379.	John VI Kantakouzenos (r. 1347–1354)	
—	Helena Kantakouzene; Ἑλένη Παλαιολογίνα (Καντακουζηνή)	28 May 1347 – 12 August 1376 (29 years, 3 months and 14 days) May 1381 – 16 February 1391 (9 years and 9 month) (Note: A total reign of 39 years a few weeks; just some months behind Empress Ariadne.)	1333/4 – August 1397 (aged 63–54) Daughter of John VI and Irene, lost her title after the coup of Andronikos IV in 1376. John V escaped his imprisonment and regained the throne on July 1379, but Helena was taken hostage and was not released until May 1381. Became a nun and changed her name to "Hypomone".	John V Palaiologos (r. 1341–1391)	
—	Irene Palaiologina; Εἰρήνη Παλαιολογίνα	February 1354 – December 1357 (3 years and 10 months)	Daughter of Demetrios Palaiologos (son of Andronikos II). Capture alongside Matthew and delivered to John V; probably lived in retirement with her husband.	Matthew Kantakouzenos (r. 1353–1357)	
	Keratsa / Maria of Bulgaria; Μαρία (Παλαιολογίνα)	spring 1356 – 30 May 1373 (17 years) 12 August 1376 – 28 June 1385 (8 years, 10 months and 16 days) (Note: A total reign of 25 years and about 10 months.)	1346 – c. 1400 (aged approx. 54) Daughter of Ivan Alexander of Bulgaria, betrothed on 17 August 1355. She was captured alongside Andronikos following his failed rebellion in 1373. Andronikos escaped and deposed his father in 1376, but was deposed on 1 July 1379 and forced to flee. Their imperial status was re-acknowledged in May 1381. She became a nun under the monastic name of "Mathissa".	Andronikos IV Palaiologos (r. 1376–1379) (Note: Andronikos IV was proclaiemd co-emperor in 1352.)	
	Helena Dragaš; Ἑλένη Παλαιολογίνα	February 1392 – 21 July 1425 (33 years and 5 months)	Daughter of magnate Konstantin Dragaš, arrived in Constantinople in December 1391, during Manuel's travels in the West. She ruled as regent between the death of her son John VIII (31 Oct. 1448) and the arrival of Constantine XI (12 March 1449). Died on 23 March 1450.	Manuel II Palaiologos (r. 1391–1425)	
—	Irene Gattilusio; Εἰρήνη Παλαιολογίνα (Γατελούζου)	late 1403 – 22 September 1408 (5 years, in Thessalonica)	Daughter of Francesco II of Lesbos, married in July 1397. Died as a nun under the monastic name "Eugenia" on 1 January 1440.	John VII Palaiologos (r. 1390; 1403–1408) (Note: John VII was proclaimed co-emperor in 1377. He deposed his father in 1390, but was quickly defeated. He was released and ruled as regent during Manuel's absence (1399–1403), although it's not clear whether he ruled as "emperor". He was expelled from Constantinople as soon as Manuel returned, but was appointed "Emperor of Thessalonica" soon after.)	
	Anna / Irene of Moscow; Εἰρήνη Παλαιολογίνα	1414 – August 1417 (3 year)	1403 – August 1417 (aged 14) Daughter of Vasily I of Moscow, betrothed by 1411; died young.	John VIII Palaiologos (r. 1425–1448) (Note: John VIII was proclaimed co-emperor in or shortly before 1407, but was not crowned until 1421.)	
—	Sophia of Montferrat; Σοφία (Παλαιολογίνα)	19 January 1421 – August 1426 (5 years and 7 months)	Daughter of Theodore II of Montferrat, she was disliked because of her appearance and thus lived in isolation. She divorced John and returned to Italy, where she died on 21 August 1434.	John VIII Palaiologos (r. 1425–1448)	
	Maria of Trebizond; Μαρία Κομνηνή Καντακουζηνή Παλαιολογίνα	September 1427 – 17 December 1439 (12 years and 3 months)	Daughter of Alexios IV of Trebizond and Theodora Kantakouzene, arrived in Constantinople on 30 August 1427. She became a nun shortly before her death in 1439, adopting the monastic name "Makaria".	John VIII Palaiologos (r. 1425–1448)	

== See also ==
- List of Roman emperors
- List of Latin empresses
- List of empresses of the Byzantine successor states
- List of Greek royal consorts
