= Aelia Flaccilla =

Roman empress from 379 to 386

- Augusta
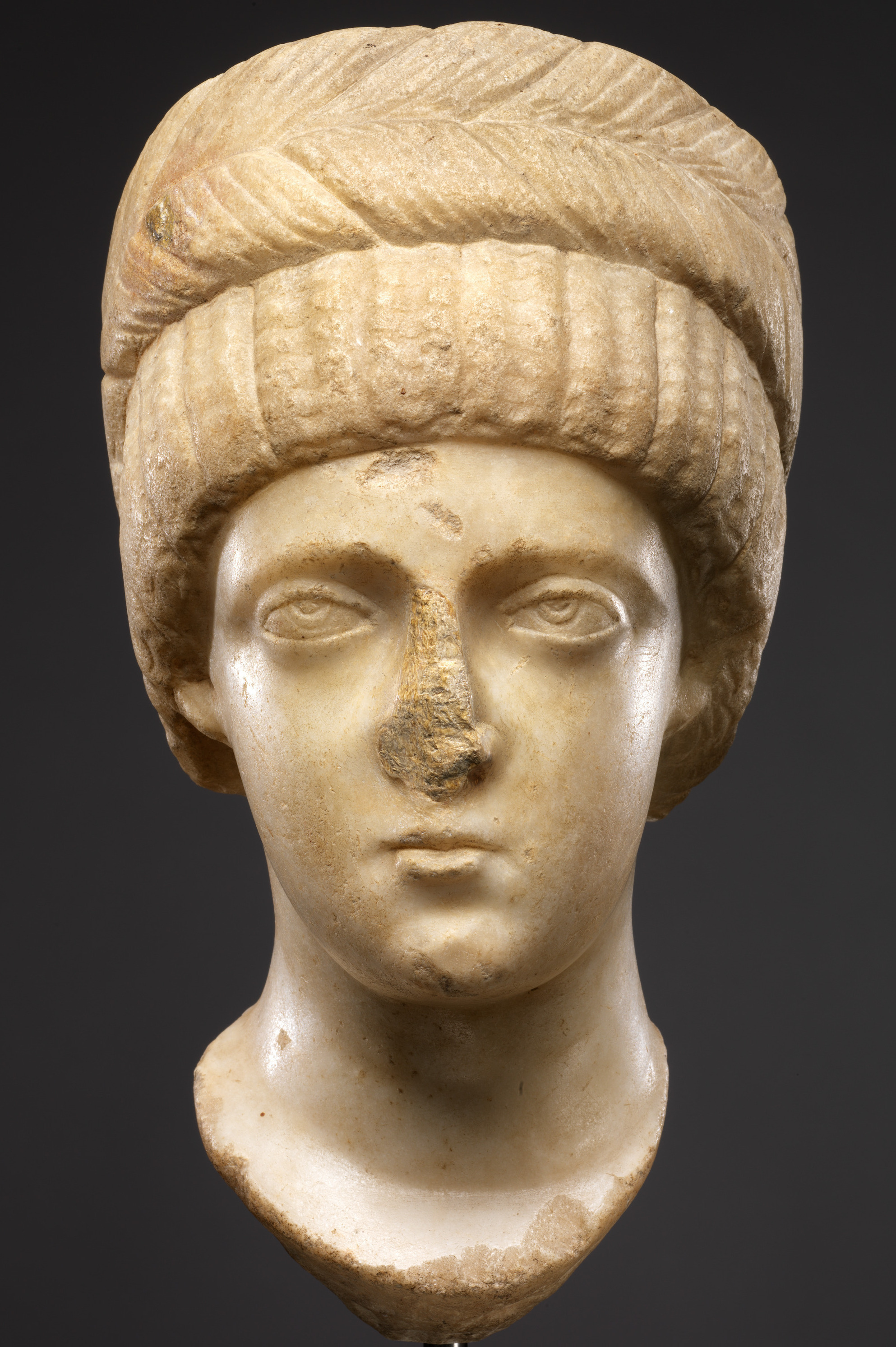
- Head thought to represent Flaccilla, Metropolitan Museum of Art

Roman empress
- Tenure: 379–386
- Born: Aelia Flaccilla c. 356
- Died: 386; Constantinople, Roman Empire
- Burial: Church of the Holy Apostles, Constantinople, Roman Empire (modern-day Istanbul, Turkey)
- Spouse: Theodosius I (m. 376)
- Issue: Arcadius; Pulcheria; Honorius
Regnal name
- Aelia Flavia Flaccilla Augusta
- Dynasty: Theodosian
- Religion: Nicene Christianity

Saint Aelia Flaccilla
- Died: 386
- Venerated in: Catholic Church; Eastern Orthodox Church
- Feast: 14 September

Aelia Flavia Flaccilla (died 386), better known simply as Aelia Flacilla or Flacilla, was a Roman empress and first wife of the Roman Emperor Theodosius I. She was of Hispanian Roman descent. During her marriage to Theodosius, she gave birth to two sons – future Emperors Arcadius and Honorius – and a daughter, Aelia Pulcheria.

== Family ==
According to Laus Serenae ("In Praise of Serena"), a poem by Claudian, both Serena and Flaccilla were from Hispania.

A passage of Themistius (Oratio XVI, De Saturnino) has been interpreted to identify Flaccilla's father as Claudius Antonius, Praetorian prefect of Gaul from 376 to 377 and Roman consul in 382. However the relation is considered doubtful. In 1967, John Robert Martindale, later one of several article writers in the Prosopography of the Later Roman Empire, suggested that the passage actually identifies Antonius as the brother-in-law of Theodosius. However the passage is vague enough to allow Afranius Syagrius, co-consul of Antonius in 382, to be the brother-in-law in question. The only kin clearly identified in primary sources was her nephew Nebridius, son of an unnamed sister.

== Marriage ==
In 376, Flaccilla married Theodosius I, the son of Count Theodosius, a high ranking general under Valentinian I. At the time Theodosius had withdrawn to civilian life in Cauca, Gallaecia after the mysterious execution of his father.

Their first son Arcadius, as well as their daughter Pulcheria, were born prior to the elevation of Theodosius as emperor. Their second son Honorius was born on 9 September 384.

== Empress ==
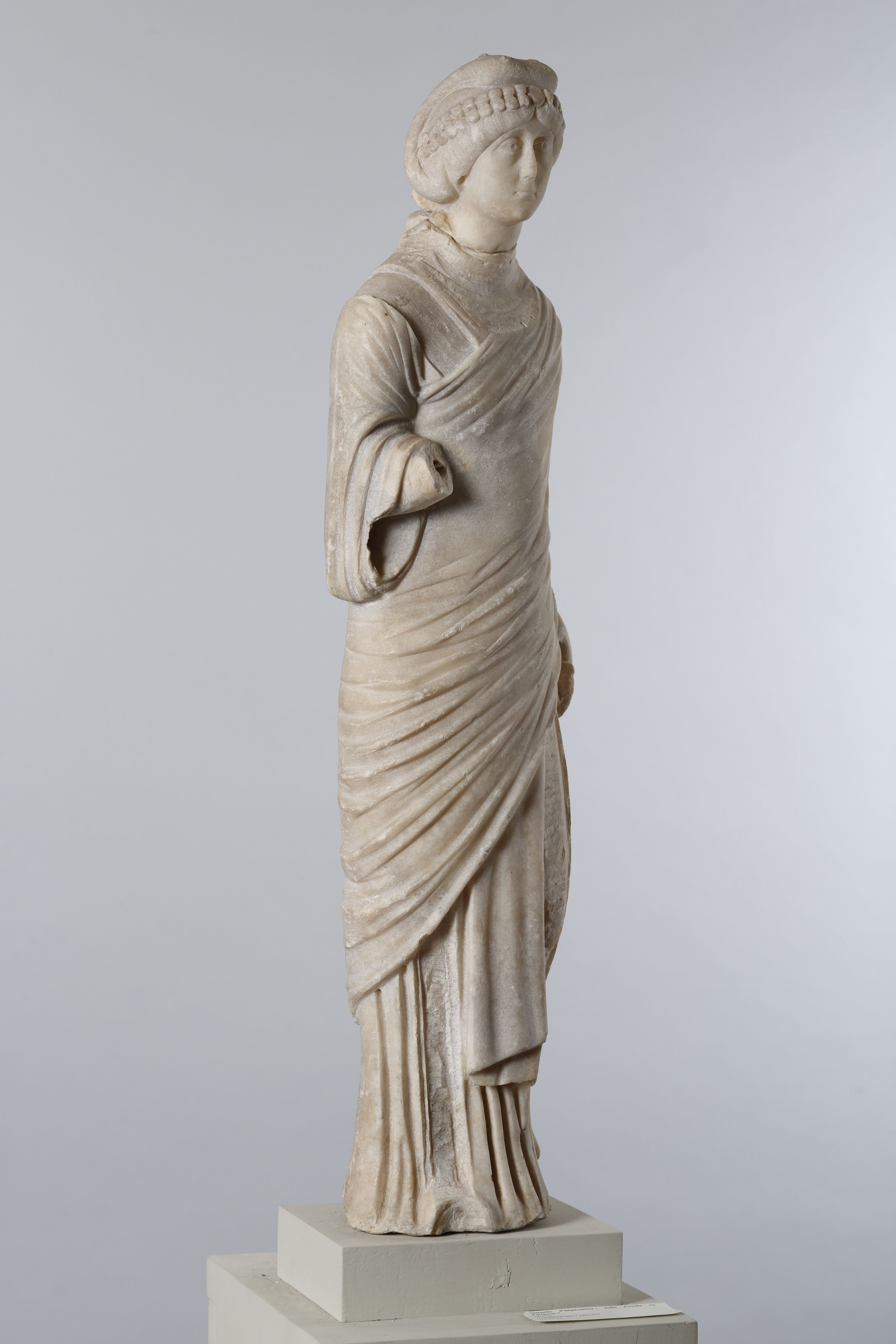
Statuette in the Bibliothèque nationale in Paris

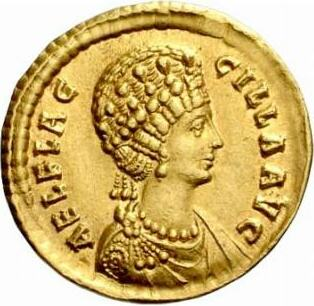
Portrait on a solidus

The Eastern Roman emperor Valens was killed at the Battle of Adrianople on 9 August 378. His nephew and co-emperor Gratian appointed Theodosius, magister militum per Illyricum, to succeed Valens on 19 January 379. At this point Flaccilla became Roman empress and was given the title Augusta.

She was a fervent supporter of the Nicene Creed. In one instance, she prevented a conference between Theodosius and Eunomius of Cyzicus who served as figurehead of Anomoeanism, the most radical sect of Arians, in an attempt to prevent him from betraying the Nicene faith. Ambrose and Gregory of Nyssa praise her Christian virtue and comment on her role as "a leader of justice" and "pillar of the Church".

Theodoret reports on her works of charity, personally tending to the disabled. He quotes her saying that "To distribute money belongs to the imperial dignity, but I offer up for the imperial dignity itself personal service to the Giver." According to the Chronicon Paschale, the Palatium Flaccillianum of Constantinople was named in her honor.

She died in the year 386, shortly after her daughter. Gregory of Nyssa went on to deliver a funeral oration for her.

== Sainthood ==
She is commemorated as a saint by the Roman Catholic Church and the Eastern Orthodox Church, her feast day being 14 September.

== Sources ==
- Holum, Kenneth G. (1982). Theodosian Empresses: Women and Imperial Dominion in Late Antiquity. Berkeley, Los Angeles and London: University of California Press. ISBN 978-0-520-04162-2.
- Martindale, John R.; Jones, A. H. M.; Morris, John, eds. (1971). The Prosopography of the Later Roman Empire: Volume I, AD 260–395. Cambridge: Cambridge University Press. ISBN 0-521-07233-6.
- Williams, Stephen; Friell, Gerard (1994). Theodosius: The Empire at Bay. Yale University Press. ISBN 978-0-300-07447-5.
- Grierson, Philip; Mango, Cyril; Ševčenko, Ihor (1962). "The Tombs and Obits of the Byzantine Emperors (337–1042); With an Additional Note". Dumbarton Oaks Papers. 16: 1–63. doi:10.2307/1291157. ISSN 0070-7546.

Royal titles
Preceded by Domnica; In the Eastern Roman Empire	Roman Empress consort 379–386 with Constantia (379–383); Laeta (383)	Succeeded by Galla
Preceded by Constantia; In the Western Roman Empire	Roman Empress consort 379–386 with Constantia (379–383); Laeta (383)	Succeeded by Galla
