= Aturus =

Scientific classification
- Kingdom: Animalia
- Phylum: Arthropoda
- Subphylum: Chelicerata
- Class: Arachnida
- Order: Trombidiformes
- Family: Aturidae
- Genus: Aturus; Kramer, 1875

Genus of mites

Aturus is a genus of mites belonging to the family Aturidae.

The species of this genus are found in Europe, Japan, Southern Africa and Northern America.

Species:

- Aturus acadiensis Habeeb, 1953
- Aturus amnigenus Mitchell, 1954
