= Albia (mite) =

Scientific classification
- Domain: Eukaryota
- Kingdom: Animalia
- Phylum: Arthropoda
- Subphylum: Chelicerata
- Class: Arachnida
- Order: Trombidiformes
- Family: Aturidae
- Genus: Albia; Thon, 1899

Genus of mites

Albia is a genus of mites in the family Aturidae. There are about 18 described species in Albia.

== Species ==
These 18 species belong to the genus Albia:

- Albia australica Cook, 1986
- Albia caerula Marshall, 1927
- Albia crocker
- Albia davidsi Smit & Van der Hammen, 1992
- Albia hystrix Viets, 1914
- Albia ilikensis
- Albia ironicus
- Albia kseniae Pešić, 2014
- Albia longipalpis Wiles, 1992
- Albia lundbladi Cook, 1986
- Albia neogaea Habeeb, 1966 (North America)
- Albia papuaensis
- Albia rectifrons Viets, 1935
- Albia stationis Thon, 1899
- Albia suvarna Cook, 1967
- Albia tenuipalpis Viets, 1911
- Albia wauensis Wiles, 1992
- Albia yorkensis
