= Barbaxonella =

Scientific classification
- Domain: Eukaryota
- Kingdom: Animalia
- Phylum: Arthropoda
- Subphylum: Chelicerata
- Class: Arachnida
- Order: Trombidiformes
- Family: Aturidae
- Genus: Barbaxonella; Lundblad, 1954

Genus of spiders

Barbaxonella is a genus of mites belonging to the family Aturidae.

The species of this genus are found in Europe.

Species:

- Barbaxonella angulata (Viets, 1955)
- Barbaxonella bingolensis
