= Domnica =

Roman empress from 364 to 378

Roman empress
- Tenure: 364–378
- Died: after 378
- Spouse: Valens
- Issue: Valentinianus Galates; Carosa; Anastasia
- Dynasty: Valentinianic
- Father: Petronius

Domnica (Note: Kienast 2017, p. 317 gives her name as "Albia (?) Domnica", but does not elaborate on the origin of this name. Contemporary sources just refer to her as "Domnica".) was a Roman empress as the wife of the emperor Valens, who ruled the East from 364 to 378. After the death of her husband at the Battle of Adrianople, she ruled as de facto regent and defended Constantinople against the attacking Goths until his successor Theodosius I arrived.

== Family ==
Domnica was the daughter of a soldier named Petronius, who was promoted to praetorian prefect by Valens after he became emperor. Petronius was deeply unpopular for his cruelty and greed, which was one reason why Procopius decided to revolt in 365.

Petronius was probably a Pannonian. Her further ancestry is unknown. Various of her relatives held influential positions. A possible relative is Domnicus, an officer of Valens mentioned in Oration II by Libanius. Procopius, prefect of Constantinople in 377, is mentioned by Zosimus as a relative of Valens by marriage, meaning he was related to Domnica. According to Nicetas of Serra, Eusebius was her uncle and a praefectus urbi in the Diocese of Pontus. Nicetas was a commentator to the works of Gregory of Nazianzus and identified Eusebius with an otherwise unnamed figure mentioned in the works of Gregory. Eusebius is thus supposedly recorded in the funeral oration in honor of Basil of Caesarea.

The names Anastasia, Domnicus, Eusebius, Petronius and Procopius used by various family members are thought to be Greek in origin. Various scholars have suggested this could indicate the descent of Domnica and her relatives from Greek-speaking families of Sirmium, the initial capital of the Praetorian prefecture of Illyricum. Marriage into a Greek family could have helped solidify Valens' rule over the Hellenized Eastern Roman Empire.

== Marriage ==
She married Valens prior to his accession as emperor and had two daughters, Anastasia and Carosa, as well as a son, Valentinianus Galates. Both daughters were tutored by Marcian, a former palatinus (paladin). Marcian had become a Novatianist presbyter, and his continued service at court was attributed to Valens’ more tolerant stance regarding Novatianists.

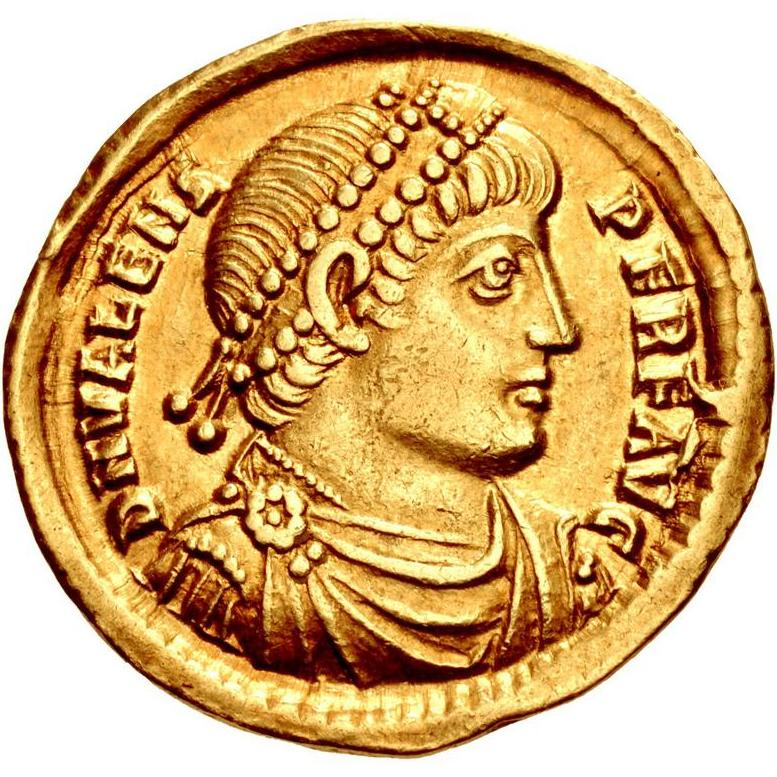
Solidus of Valens

== Religious scandals and the death of Galates ==
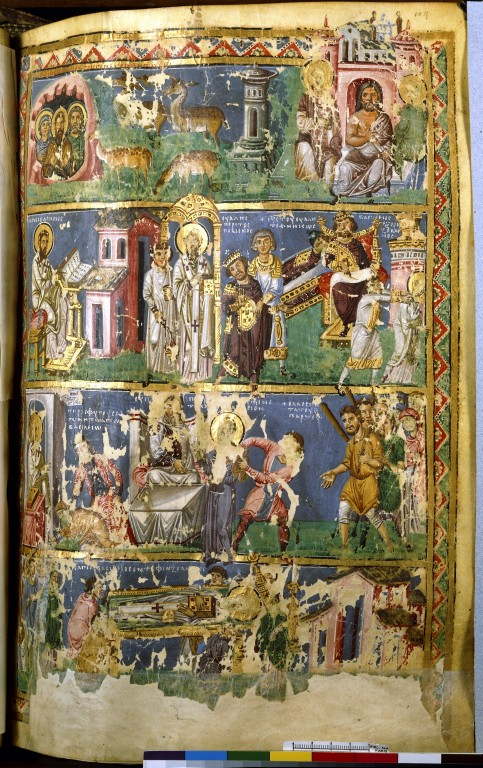
The death of Valentinianus Galates and the persecution of Nicene Christians under Valens depicted in the 9th century Paris Gregory.

The history of the Christian Church in the early 4th century was marked by the Trinitarian controversy. The First Council of Nicaea in 325 had established the Nicene Creed, which declared that the Father, Son, and Holy Spirit were all equal to each other and of the same substance. The theologian Arius, founder of Arianism, disagreed with this and believed that the three parts of the Trinity were materially separate from each other and that the Father created the Son. Domnica was already an Arian and is rumored to have persuaded her husband Valens to convert to the Arian sect. In about 367, according to Theodoret, Domnica convinced Valens to seek baptism from Eudoxius of Antioch, Archbishop of Constantinople. Eudoxius was one of the most influential Arians.

Valens was one of the few emperors of the century to favor the Arians. The empress is accused, with no proof, of having urged her husband to persecute the Trinitarian sect, including persecuting many prominent bishops. Persecution was common throughout his reign.

A group of pagan philosophers engaged in divination and predicted that a certain philosopher named Theodore would be the next emperor. When Valens discovered this prophecy he considered the philosophers guilty of a plot against his safety. Valens became enraged and killed the philosophers and, such was his fury, also killed other entirely innocent philosophers and even those dressed like philosophers.

Valens's son Valentinianus Galates died young, a great blow to his parents, surrounded by religious scandal and quarrels. According to Socrates, Domnica told her husband that she had been having visions that their son's illness was a punishment for ill treatment of the bishop Basil of Caesarea. Basil was a prominent orthodox leader who opposed the emperor's semi-Arian beliefs. When asked to pray for the child, Basil is said to have asked Valens's commitment to orthodoxy as the condition for the boy's survival. Valens refused and instead gave his son an Arian baptism. Basil replied by saying that God's will would be done, and Galates died soon after.

== Defeat at Adrianople and the death of Valens ==
Valens was killed at the Battle of Adrianople on August 9, 378. The Goths then continued to move east and attacked Constantinople. Because there was no emperor to lead the forces, the empress was forced to organize a counterattack. She paid soldiers’ wages out of the imperial treasury to any civilian volunteers who were willing to arm themselves against the invaders.

After that, Domnica disappears from the historical record. The date and circumstances of her death remain unknown.

== Sources ==
- Kienast, Dietmar (2017) [1990]. Römische Kaisertabelle: Grundzüge einer römischen Kaiserchronologie (in German) (6th ed.). Darmstadt: WBG. ISBN 978-3-534-26724-8.
- Socrates; Walford, Edward; de Valois, Henri (1853). The Ecclesiastical History of Socrates. London: Bohn. pp. 211–261. ISBN 9780524006528.
- Banchich, Thomas (3 November 1997). "Domnica Augusta, Wife of the Emperor Valens". Canisius College. Archived from the original on 17 June 2007.
- Martindale, John R.; Jones, A. H. M.; Morris, John, eds. (1971). The Prosopography of the Later Roman Empire: Volume I, AD 260–395. Cambridge: Cambridge University Press. ISBN 0-521-07233-6.
- Lenski, Noel (2002). Failure of Empire: Valens and the Roman State in the Fourth Century A.D. Univ of California Press. ISBN 978-0-520-28389-3.
- Lenski, Noel (1997). "Initium mali Romano imperio: Contemporary Reactions to the Battle of Adrianople". Transactions of the American Philological Association. 127: 129–168. doi:10.2307/284390. JSTOR 284390.
- Smith, William, ed. (1862). "Valens". Dictionary of Greek and Roman Biography and Mythology. London: Spottiswoodes and Shaw. pp. 1202–1205.
- Grant, Michael (1985). The Roman Emperors. London: Weidenfeld and Nicolson. pp. 263–265.
- Lewis, Naphtali, and Meyer Reinhold, eds. Roman Civilization: Volume II: the Empire. New York: Columbia UP, 1990. 594–597, 614–615.
- Schaff, Philip. Theodoret, Jerome, Gennadius, and Rufinus: Historical Writings. Vol. 3. Edinburgh: T & T Clark, 1892. Christian Classics Ethereal Library. 17 May 2007 <http://www.ccel.org/ccel/schaff/npnf203.i.html Archived 2019-05-15 at the Wayback Machine>.

Royal titles
Preceded by Marina Severa	Roman Empress consort 364–378 with Marina Severa (364–c. 370); Justina (370–375); Constantia (374–378)	Succeeded by Constantia; In the Western Roman Empire
Preceded by Marina Severa	Roman Empress consort 364–378 with Marina Severa (364–c. 370); Justina (370–375); Constantia (374–378)	Succeeded by Aelia Flaccilla; In the Eastern Roman Empire
