= Laeta =

Roman empress in 383

Roman empress
- Tenure: 383
- Died: after 408
- Spouse: Gratian
- Dynasty: Valentinianic
- Mother: Pissamena

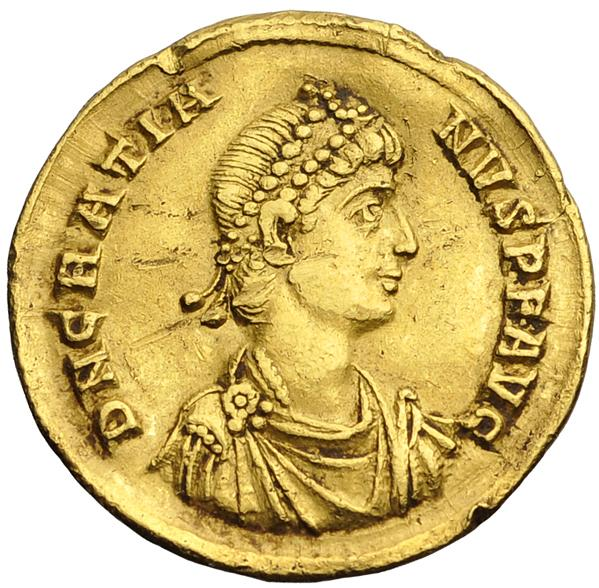
Coin with her husbands image

Laeta was a Roman empress as the second wife of the emperor Gratian.

== Empress ==
Gratian was first married to Constantia, who died at the age of 21. The Chronicon Paschale dates the arrival of Constantia's remains in Constantinople to 31 August 383. She presumably died earlier in the same year, but the exact date and cause of her death are unknown. As Gratian was himself assassinated on 25 August 383, Laeta must have married him in the short period between the death of Constantia and his death.

Sozomen seemed to be aware of their marriage, as he recorded that Gratian had gotten recently married in his account of the emperor’s demise.

== Widow ==
After Gratian’s death, his co-emperor Theodosius I granted a pension to both Laeta and her mother Pissamena. On his account of the first siege of Rome by Alaric I, King of the Visigoths (dated to 408), Zosimus mentioned that the city faced a famine. The historian recorded how the two women used the money given to them by Theodosius to assist in supplying food to many people.

This is the only mention of Laeta in primary sources.

Royal titles
Preceded by Constantia; In the Western Roman Empire	Roman Empress consort 383 with Aelia Flaccilla (383)	Succeeded by Aelia Flaccilla
Preceded by Aelia Flaccilla; In the Eastern Roman Empire	Roman Empress consort 383 with Aelia Flaccilla (383)	Succeeded by Aelia Flaccilla
