= Aturidae =

Scientific classification
- Kingdom: Animalia
- Phylum: Arthropoda
- Subphylum: Chelicerata
- Class: Arachnida
- Order: Trombidiformes
- Family: Aturidae

Family of trombidiform mites

Aturidae is a family of mites belonging to the order Trombidiformes.

== Genera ==
Genera:

- Abelaturus Cook, 1985
- Adelaxonopsella Cook, 1974
- Albaxona Szalay, 1944
- Barbaxonella Lundblad, 1954
- Kuschelacarus Cook, 1992
- Aturus Kramer, 1875
