= Constantia (wife of Gratian) =

Roman empress from 374 to 383

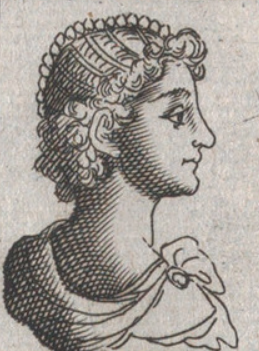
- Imaginary 16th-century portrait from Speculum Romanae Magnificentiae

Roman empress
- Tenure: 374 AD – 383 AD (alongside Justina in 374–375 AD)
- Born: 362 AD
- Died: 383 AD
- Spouse: Gratian
- Dynasty: Valentinianic dynasty by marriage; Constantinian dynasty by birth
- Father: Constantius II
- Mother: Faustina

Constantia (Note: The Dictionary of Greek and Roman Biography and Mythology gives her name as "Flavia Maxima Constantia", but this name is not attested in contemporary sources. The same source also gives Faustina the full name of "Flavia Aurelia Faustina" which do not appear in ancient sources either.) (362–383) was the first empress consort of Gratian of the Western Roman Empire. According to Ammianus Marcellinus, her mother was Faustina and her father was Constantius II, who died before Constantia was born.

== Early life ==
Constantia's paternal uncles included Crispus, Constantine II and Constans. Her paternal aunts included Constantina, wife of first Hannibalianus and secondly Constantius Gallus, and Helena, wife of Julian the Apostate. Her paternal grandparents were Constantine the Great and Fausta.

On 3 November 361, Constantius II died of a fever at Mopsucrene, near Tarsus, Cilicia. He was heading west to face a revolt by Julian, his first cousin and brother-in-law. In a reported deathbed decision, Constantius officially acknowledged Julian as his heir. When Constantia was born sometime after, Julian was already firmly established on the throne.

On 26 June 363, Julian was fatally wounded in the Battle of Samarra against the forces of Shapur II of the Sassanid Empire. He died a few hours following the conclusion of the battle. His death left Constantia the last confirmed descendant of the Constantinian dynasty.

Constantia and her mother Faustina were present when Procopius received the insignia of the imperial rites in Constantinople. Faustina and her young daughter's presence suggested that Procopius was the rightful heir of the Constantinian dynasty which was still held in reverence. Ammianus Marcellinus tells that Procopius "always bore with him on a litter the little daughter of Constantius and grand daughter of the great Constantine, with her mother Faustina, both when marching and when preparing for battle, thus exciting the soldiers to fight more resolutely for the imperial family, with which, as he told them, he himself was connected." At age four Constantia had become instrumental in another conflict for the Roman throne. On 27 May 366, Procopius was executed and Faustina does not resurface in the sources after that, but Constantia survived the fall of her kinsman.

== Empress consort ==
In 374, Constantia, who was about twelve years old, was just reaching marriageable age when she was sent west to marry Gratian, who was about fourteen and was the eldest son and co-ruler of Valentinian I. Near Sirmium, Constantia and her escort were attacked by a raiding party including Quadi and Sarmatians. She barely evaded captivity. On 27 June 374, the dedication of a bath complex in Calabria first mentions Constantia as an empress alongside her stepmother-in-law Justina.

Within the year following the marriage, Valentinian I moved his headquarters to Aquincum, Pannonia, to be better able to coordinate his conflict with the Quadi. Gratian and Constantia were left in charge of Trier, implying that Gratian had started acting as co-ruler in more than name Gratian soon became the senior Western Emperor, with his younger half-brother Valentinian II proclaimed co-emperor.

In 380, John Chrysostom mentions Constantia still being alive. She is next mentioned in the Chronicon Paschale dating the arrival of her remains in Constantinople to 31 August 383. She must have died earlier in the same year but the exact date and cause of her death are unknown. She was about twenty-one at the time of her death. Gratian had proceeded to marry Laeta but was assassinated on 25 August 383. The Chronicon gives her burial date as 1 December 383.

== Bibliography ==
- Martindale, John R.; Jones, A. H. M.; Morris, John, eds. (1971). The Prosopography of the Later Roman Empire: Volume I, AD 260–395. Cambridge: Cambridge University Press. ISBN 0-521-07233-6.
- Lenski, Noel (2003). Failure of Empire: Valens and the Roman State in the Fourth Century A.D. Berkeley: University of California Press. ISBN 0-520-23332-8.
- McEvoy, Meaghan (2016). "Constantia: The Last Constantinian". Antichthon. 50: 154–179. doi:10.1017/ann.2016.10. S2CID 151430655.
- Potter, David S. (2004). The Roman Empire at Bay: AD 180–395. New York: Routledge. ISBN 0-415-10057-7.

Royal titles
Preceded by Justina; In the Western Roman Empire	Roman Empress consort 374–383 with Justina (374–375); Domnica (374–378); Aelia Flaccilla (379–383)	Succeeded by Laeta; In the Western Roman Empire
Preceded by Domnica; In the Eastern Roman Empire	Roman Empress consort 374–383 with Justina (374–375); Domnica (374–378); Aelia Flaccilla (379–383)	Succeeded by Aelia Flaccilla; In the Eastern Roman Empire
