= Gratian =

Roman emperor from 367 to 383

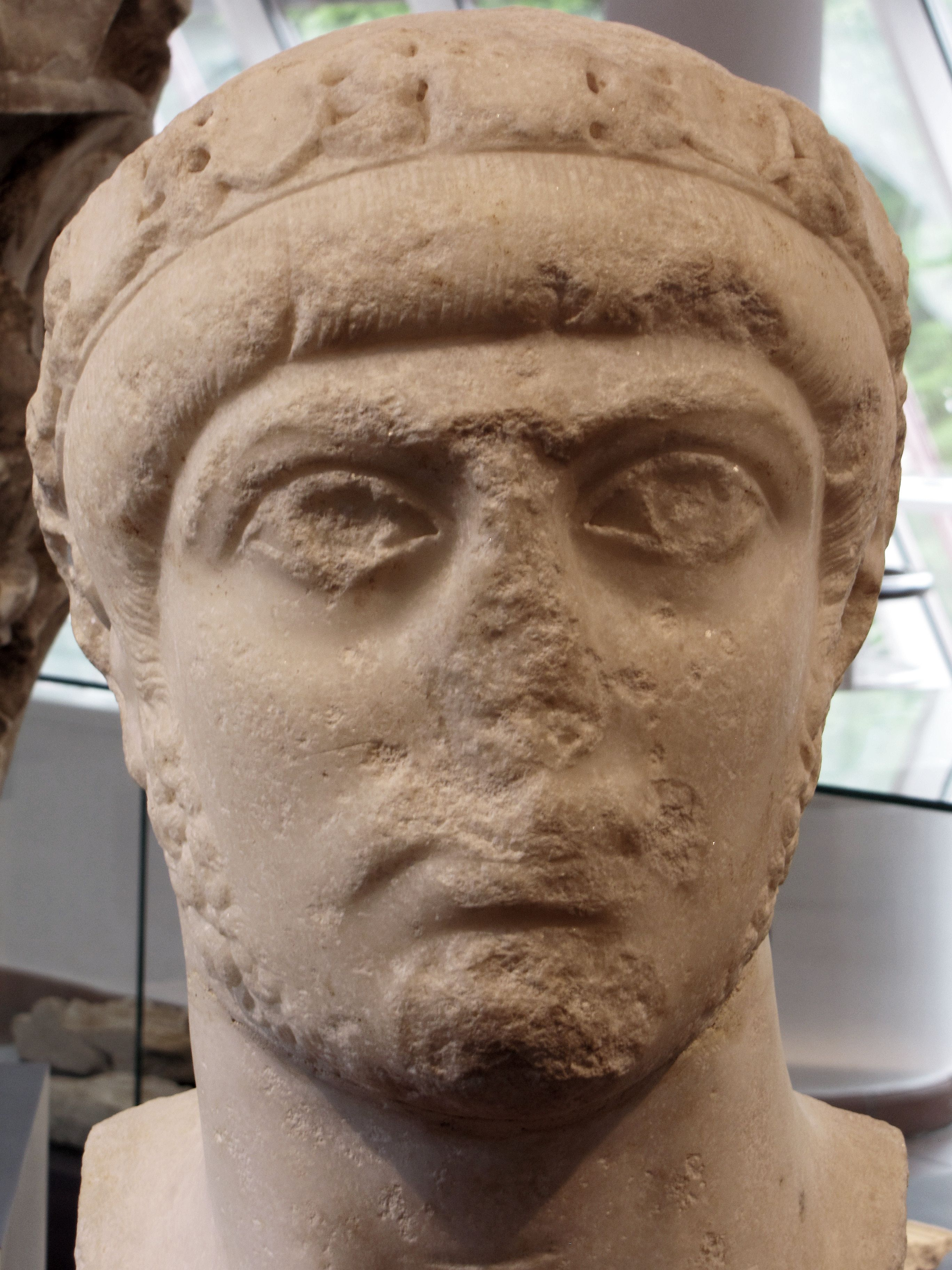
- Bust possibly representing Gratian found in Trier, (Rheinisches Landesmuseum Trier).

Roman emperor
- Augustus: 24 August 367 – 25 August 383 (senior from 17 November 375)
- Predecessor: Valentinian I
- Successor: Magnus Maximus
- Co-rulers: Valentinian I (367–375); Valens (East, 367–378); Valentinian II (375–383); Theodosius I (East, 379–383); Arcadius (East, 383)
- Born: 18 April 359; Sirmium, Pannonia Secunda (present-day Sremska Mitrovica, Serbia)
- Died: 25 August 383 (aged 24); Lugdunum, Gallia Lugdunensis (present-day Lyon, France)
- Burial: Imperial mausoleum at Mediolanum (now Sant'Aquilino, Basilica of San Lorenzo, Milan)
- Spouse: Constantia; Laeta
Regnal name
- Imperator Caesar Flavius Gratianus Augustus
- Dynasty: Valentinianic
- Father: Valentinian I
- Mother: Marina Severa
- Religion: Nicene Christianity

Gratian (/ˈɡreɪʃiən/; Latin: Gratianus; 18 April 359 – 25 August 383) was emperor of the Western Roman Empire from 367 to 383. The eldest son of Valentinian I, Gratian was raised to the rank of Augustus as a child and inherited the West after his father's death in 375. He nominally shared the government with his infant half-brother Valentinian II, who was also acclaimed emperor in Pannonia on Valentinian's death. The East was ruled by his uncle Valens, who was later succeeded by Theodosius I.

Gratian subsequently led a campaign across the Rhine, attacked the Lentienses, and forced the tribe to surrender. That same year, the eastern emperor Valens was killed fighting the Goths at the Battle of Adrianople, which led to Gratian elevating Theodosius to replace him in 379. Gratian favoured Catholicism over traditional Roman religion, issuing the Edict of Thessalonica, refusing the office of pontifex maximus, and removing the Altar of Victory from the Roman Senate's Curia Julia. The city of Cularo on the Isère river in Roman Gaul was renamed Gratianopolis after him, which later evolved to Grenoble. By 383 Gratian had become unpopular with his army, which abandoned him during a confrontation with the usurper Magnus Maximus near Lutetia (Paris). Gratian fled to Lugdunum and was later murdered.

== Early life ==
According to the Chronicle of Jerome and the Chronicon Paschale, Valentinian's eldest son Gratian was born on 18 April 359 at Sirmium, now Sremska Mitrovica in Serbia, the capital of Pannonia Secunda, to Valentinian's first wife Marina Severa. Gratian was his parents' only son together. At the time of his birth Gratian's father was living in exile. Gratian was named after his grandfather Gratianus, who was a tribune and later comes of Britannia for Constantine the Great.

Following the death of the emperor Jovian, on 26 February 364, Valentinian was proclaimed Augustus (emperor). Within a month, motivated by senior officers, he proclaimed his brother Valens, Gratian's uncle, Augustus of the Eastern empire. Gratian was appointed consul in 366 and was entitled nobilissimus puer by his father. (Note: noblest boy) Gratian was seven when entitled nobilissimus puer, which indicated he was to be proclaimed Augustus. His tutor was the rhetor Ausonius, who mentioned the relationship in his epigrams and a poem.

== Reign ==
In summer 367, Valentinian became ill at Civitas Ambianensium (Amiens), raising questions about his succession. On recovery, he presented his then eight-year-old son to his troops on 24 August, as his co-augustus, passing over the customary initial step of caesar.

=== Junior augustus ===
Valentinian, concerned with Gratian's age and inexperience, stated his son would assist commanders with upcoming campaigns. The magister peditum Merobaudes, together with the comes rei militaris Sebastianus, was sent by Valentinian to campaign against the Quadi.

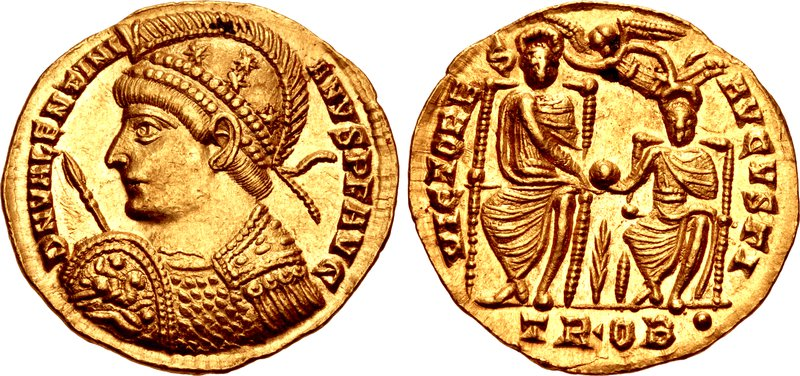
Solidus of Valentinian I showing Valentinian and Gratian on the reverse, marked: victores augusti ("the Victors Augusti"). A palm bough is between them and Victory crowns each with a wreath

In January 365 a party of Alamanni crossed over the Rhine into Roman Germania and Gaul, overwhelming the Roman defences. Jovinus, the magister equitum in Gaul, inflicted heavy losses on the enemy at Scarpona (Dieulouard) and at Catalauni (Châlons-sur-Marne), forcing them to retire. In the summer of 368, king Vithicabius was murdered in a coup, and Valentinian and Gratian took the opportunity to cross the river Moenus (the Main) and lay waste to Alamannic territories. Gratian was awarded the victory titles of Germanicus Maximus and Alamannicus Maximus, and Francicus Maximus and Gothicus Maximus in 369.

Valentinian fortified the frontier from Raetia in the east to the Belgic channel, but the construction was attacked by Alamanni at Mount Pirus (the Spitzberg, Rottenburg am Neckar). In 369 (or 370) Valentinian then sought to enlist the help of the Burgundians, who were involved in a dispute with the Alamanni, but a communication failure led to them returning to their lands without joining forces with the Romans. It was then that the magister equitum, Theodosius the Elder and his son Theodosius (the Theodosi) attacked the Alamanni through Raetia, taking many prisoners and resettling them in the Po Valley in Italy. Valentinian made one attempt to capture Macrianus in 372, but eventually made peace with him in 374.

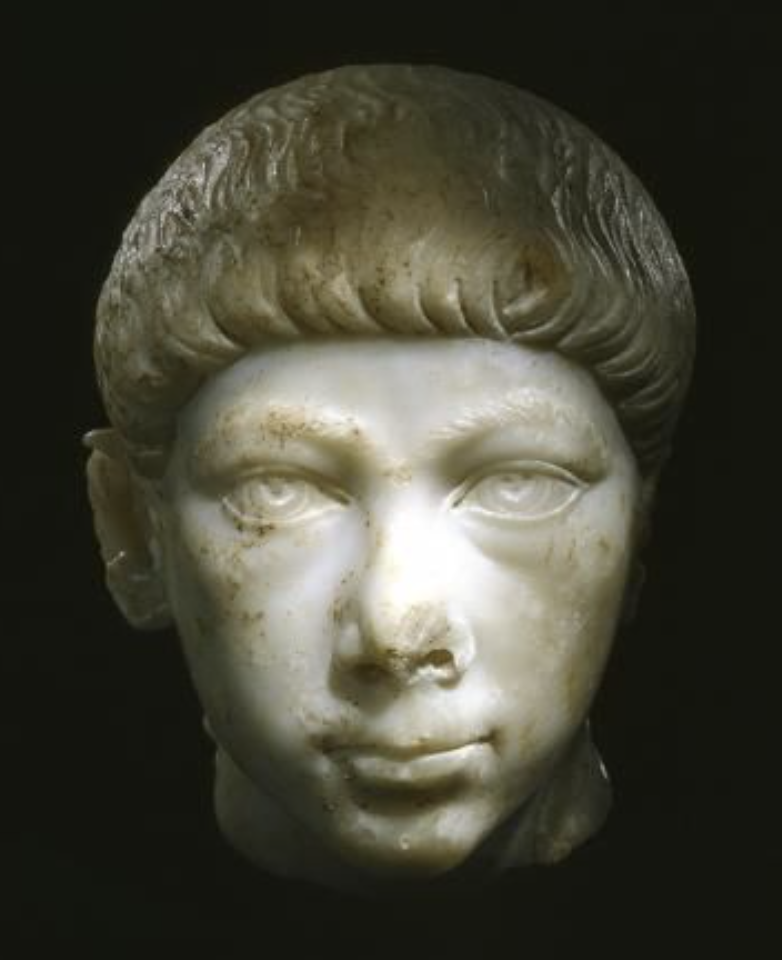
Marble head of a young Gratian, around 370–375.

Gratian, who was then 15, was married in 374 to Constantius II's 13 year-old posthumous daughter Constantia at Trier.

The necessity to make peace was the increasing threat from other peoples, the Quadi and the Sarmatians. Valentinian's decision to establish garrisons across the Danube had angered them, and the situation escalated after the Quadi king, Gabinus, was killed during negotiations with the Romans in 374. Consequently, in the autumn, the Quadi crossed the Danube plundering Pannonia and the provinces to the south. The situation deteriorated further once the Sarmatians made common cause inflicting heavy losses on the Pannonica and Moesiaca legions. However, on encountering Theodosius' forces on the borders of Moesia in the eastern Balkans, which had previously defeated one of their armies in 373, they sued for peace. Valentinian mounted a further offensive against the Quadi in August 375, this time using a pincer movement, one force attacking from the northwest, while Valentinian himself headed to Aquincum (Budapest), crossed the Danube and attacked from the southeast. This campaign resulted in heavy losses to the enemy, following which he returned to Aquincum and from there to Brigetio (Szőny, Hungary) where he died suddenly in November.

=== Senior augustus ===
When his father died on 17 November 375, Gratian inherited the administration of the western empire. Days later, Gratian's half-brother Valentinian was acclaimed augustus by troops in Pannonia. He was forced to accept the proclamation, though he did supervise his younger brother's upbringing. Despite Valentinian being given nominal authority over the praetorian prefectures of Italy, Illyricum, and Africa, Gratian ruled the western Roman empire himself. His tutor Ausonius became his quaestor, and together with the magister militum, Merobaudes, the power behind the throne. Neither Gratian nor Valentinian travelled much, possibly avoiding public appearances which would let the populace realise how young they were. Gratian is said to have visited Rome in 376, possibly to celebrate his decennalia on 24 August, but whether the visit actually took place is disputed.

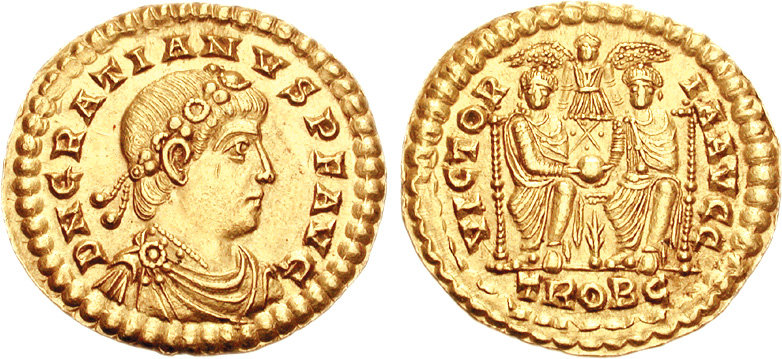
Solidus of Gratian, struck 374/5

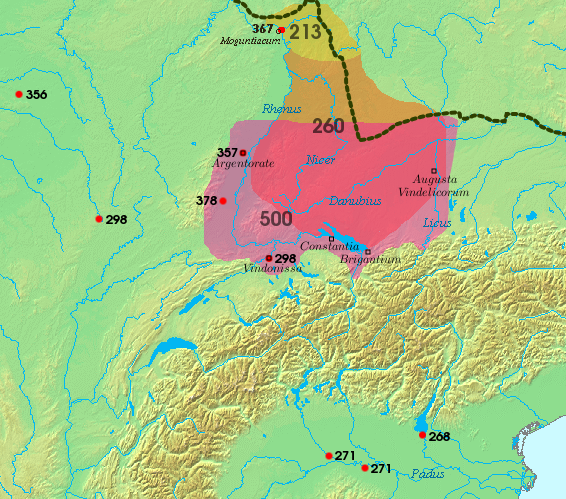
Location of the battle of Argentovaria in 378.

Gratian's uncle Valens, returning from a campaign against the Sasanian Empire, had sent a request to Gratian for reinforcements against the Goths. According to Ammianus Marcellinus, Valens also requested that Sebastianus be sent to him for the war, though according to Zosimus Sebastianus went to Constantinople of his own accord as a result of intrigues by eunuchs at the western court. Once Gratian had put down the invasions in the west in early 378, he notified Valens that he was returning to Thrace to assist him in his struggle against the Goths. Late in July, Valens was informed that the Goths were advancing on Adrianople (Edirne) and Nice, and started to move his forces into the area. However, Gratian's arrival was delayed by an encounter with Alans at Castra Martis, in Dacia in the western Balkans.

The force Gratian sent never reached Valens due to its commander feigning illness. Weeks later, Gratian had arrived in Castra Martis with a few thousand men, by which time Valens was at Adrianople (Latin: Hadrianopolis; Turkish: Edirne). Encouraged by his advisors to claim victory without sharing the glory with Gratian, as well as being misinformed about the number of enemy troops, Valens attacked the Gothic army and as a result thousands (Note: Heather estimates 10,000 Roman dead, Williams & Friell state 20,000 Roman dead.) of Romans died in the Battle of Adrianople along with Sebastianus and the emperor himself.

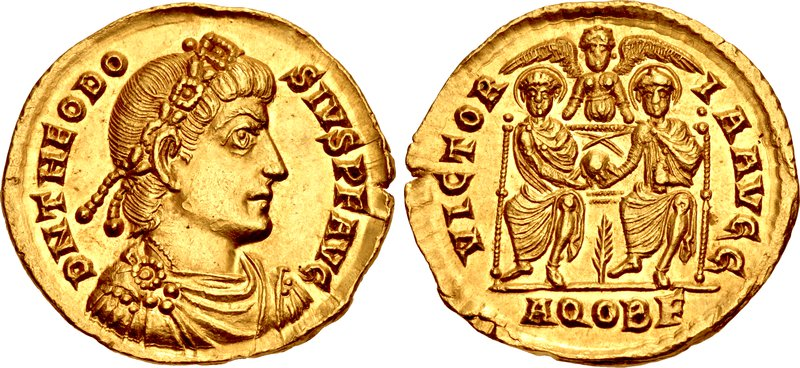
Solidus of Theodosius I showing Theodosius and Gratian on the reverse, marked: victoria augg ("the Victory of the Augusti")

In the immediate aftermath of Adrianople, Gratian issued an edict of tolerance at Sirmium, restoring bishops exiled by Valens and ensuring religious freedoms to all religions. Following the battle, the Goths raided from Thrace in 378 to Illyricum the following year. Convinced that one emperor alone was incapable of repelling the inundation of foes on several different fronts, Gratian, now senior augustus following Valens's death, appointed Theodosius I augustus on 19 January 379 to govern the east. On 3 August that year, Gratian issued an edict against heresy.

On 27 February 380, Gratian, Valentinian II, and Theodosius issued the Edict of Thessalonica. This edict made Nicene Christianity the only legal form of Christianity, outlawing all of its other branches, ending a period of widespread religious tolerance that had existed since the death of Julian. Zosimus' report that Gratian refused the robe of office of the pontifex maximus has been doubted by modern scholars, because there is no other mention of such a garment associated with the priesthood. Emperors from Gratian to Marcian styled themselves as pontifex inclytus, "honorable pontiff". The title of pontifex maximus was not adopted by the bishops of Rome until the Renaissance.

In September 380, the augusti Gratian and Theodosius met, returning the Roman diocese of Dacia to Gratian's control and that of Macedonia to Valentinian II. The same year, Gratian won a victory, possibly over the Alamanni, that was announced officially at Constantinople.

By 380, the Greuthungi tribe of Goths moved into Pannonia, only to be defeated by Gratian. Consequently, the Vandals and Alemanni were threatening to cross the Rhine, now that Gratian had departed from the region. With the collapse of the Danube frontier (Note: See also Roman military frontiers and fortifications) under the incursions of the Huns and Goths, Gratian moved his seat from Augusta Treverorum (Trier) to Mediolanum (Milan) in 381. He became increasingly aligned with the city's bishop, Ambrose, and the Roman Senate, shifting the balance of power within the factions of the western empire.

In 382, Gratian issued edicts that removed the statue of the winged goddess Victory from the Senate floor, removed the privileges of Vestal Virgins, and confiscated money designated for sacrifices and ceremonies. He declared that all of the pagan temples and shrines were to be confiscated by the government and that their revenues were to be joined to the property of the treasury. This resulted in protests from the Roman Senate led by Symmachus, which in turn was counter-protested by Christian senators led by Pope Damasus.

On 16 January 383 Theodosius made his son Arcadius co-emperor, evidently without Gratian's approval as he never recognized the promotion on his coinage. Within the same year, Gratian's wife Constantia died, and he remarried to Laeta. Both marriages remained childless. (Note: The PLRE wrongly says that Gratian and Constantia had a son that predeceased his father. None of the sources it cites supports the claim.)

Gratian alienated the army by his favouritism towards his Alan deserters, whom he made his bodyguards and to whom he gave military commands and allowing them to perform human sacrifices to Ares. (Note: McLynn suggested that the regiment of Alans was a pragmatic decision, which would also make the army's hostility well founded.) Other criticisms of his behavior were that he surrounded himself with bad company and neglected the affairs of state, preferring to have fun. (Note: Williams and Friell remarked that, “There is still no clear reason as to why Gratian's support crumbled so quickly.”) Vegetius reports that Gratian allowed soldiers to lay aside the armour and the helmet.

In the summer of 383 Gratian was again at war with the Alamanni in Raetia. Shortly after, the Roman general Magnus Maximus was proclaimed imperator by his troops and raised the standard of revolt in Britain, crossing the channel to invade Gaul with a large army. Maximus, who had served under the comes Theodosius and had won a victory over the Picts in 382, encamped with his troops near modern day Paris. There, his forces encountered Gratian's troops, but much of the latter's army defected to Maximus' side, forcing Gratian to flee.

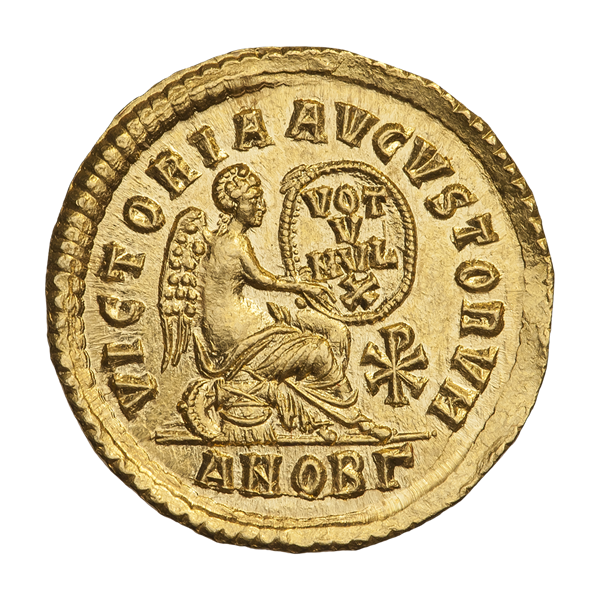
Reverse of a solidus of Gratian marked: victoria augustorum ("the Victory of the augusti")

== Death and burial ==
Gratian was pursued by Andragathius, Maximus' magister equitum and killed at Lugdunum (Lyon) on 25 August 383, supposedly against orders. Maximus then established his court at the former imperial residence in Trier. On the death of Gratian, the 12 year old Valentinian II became the sole legitimate augustus in the west.

Maximus initially kept Gratian's body for political reasons, and Ambrose's second embassy to him in 385 or 386 to recover it was unsuccessful. It would not be until 387, possibly even after the death of Magnus Maximus, that Gratian's remains were interred at Mediolanum in the imperial mausoleum. Gratian was deified in Latin: Divus Gratianus, lit. 'the Divine Gratian'.

== See also ==
- List of Roman emperors

== Sources ==
- Curran, John (1998). "Chapter 3: From Jovian to Theodosius". In Cameron, A.; Garnsey, P. (eds.). The Cambridge Ancient History XIII: The Late Empire, A.D. 337–425. Cambridge University Press. pp. 78–110. ISBN 0-521-30200-5.
- Clark, Gillian (2011). Late Antiquity: A Very Short Introduction. Oxford University Press. ISBN 978-0199546206.
- Cooley, Alison E. (2012). The Cambridge Manual of Latin Epigraphy. Cambridge University Press. ISBN 978-0-521-84026-2.
- Crosby, Daniel J. (2015). "'Arrows Fletched from Our Own Wings': The Early Church Fathers and the 'Delphi of the Mind'". In Johnston, W. Marshall; Crosby, Daniel J. (eds.). A Dangerous Mind: The Ideas and Influence of Delbert L. Wiens. Wipf and Stock Publishers. ISBN 978-1498203975.
- Dill, Samuel (1958). Roman Society in the Last Century of the Western Empire (2nd ed.). Meridian. ISBN 978-1346615486.
- Grainger, John D (2020). The Roman Imperial Succession. Pen & Sword. ISBN 978-1526766045.
- Halsall, Guy (2007). Barbarian Migrations and the Roman West, 376–568. Cambridge University Press. ISBN 978-0521435437.
- Heather, Peter (2006). The Fall of the Roman Empire: A New History of Rome and the Barbarians. Oxford University Press. ISBN 978-0195159547.
- Hebblewhite, Mark (2019). The Emperor and the Army in the Later Roman Empire, AD 235–395. Routledge. ISBN 978-0367880682.
- Hebblewhite, Mark (2020). Theodosius and the Limits of Empire. Routledge. ISBN 978-1138102989.
- Hinson, E. Glenn (1995). The Church Triumphant: A History of Christianity Up to 1300. Mercer. ISBN 0-86554-436-0.
- Johnson, Mark J. (1991). "On the Burial Places of the Valentinian Dynasty". Historia: Zeitschrift für Alte Geschichte. 40 (4): 501–506. JSTOR 4436217.
- Johnson, Mark Joseph (2009). The Roman Imperial Mausoleum in Late Antiquity. Cambridge University Press. ISBN 978-0-521-51371-5. OCLC 309835740.
- Jolly, Karen Louise (1997). Tradition & Diversity: Christianity in a World Context to 1500. M.E. Sharpe. ISBN 978-1563244674.
- Kienast, Dietmar (2017b) [1990]. "Theodosius I". In Kienast, Dietmar; Eck, Werner; Heil, Matthäus (eds.). Römische Kaisertabelle: Grundzüge einer römischen Kaiserchronologie (in German) (6 ed.). Darmstadt: Wissenschaftliche Buchgesellschaft. ISBN 978-3-534-26724-8.
- Kienast, Dietmar (2017c) [1990]. "Gratian". In Kienast, Dietmar; Eck, Werner; Heil, Matthäus (eds.). Römische Kaisertabelle: Grundzüge einer römischen Kaiserchronologie (in German) (6th ed.). Darmstadt: Wissenschaftliche Buchgesellschaft. ISBN 978-3-534-26724-8.
- Kulikowski, Michael (2019). The Tragedy of Empire: From Constantine to the Destruction of Roman Italy. Harvard University Press. ISBN 978-0674660137.
- Lee, A. D (2013). From Rome to Byzantium AD 363 to 565. Edinburgh University Press. ISBN 978-0-7486-2790-5.
- Lenski, Noel Emmanuel (2002). Failure of Empire: Valens and the Roman state in the fourth century A.D. University of California Press. ISBN 978-0-520-23332-4.
- McEvoy, Meaghan (2013). Child Emperor Rule in the Late Roman West, AD 367–455. Oxford University Press. ISBN 978-0199664818.
- McEvoy, Meaghan (2016). "Constantia: The Last Constantinian". Antichthon. 50: 154–179. doi:10.1017/ann.2016.10. S2CID 151430655.
- McLynn, Neil B. (1994), Ambrose of Milan: Church and Court in a Christian Capital, The Transformation of the Classical Heritage, vol. 22, Berkeley: University of California Press, ISBN 978-0-520-08461-2
- Medina, Néstor (2018). Christianity, Empire and the Spirit: (Re)Configuring Faith and the Cultural. Brill. ISBN 978-9004357365.
- Oost, Stewart Irvin (1968). Galla Placidia Augusta. A Biographical Essay. University of Chicago Press. ISBN 978-0226630502.
- Radde-Gallwitz, Andrew (2018). Gregory of Nyssa's Doctrinal Works: A Literary Study. Oxford University Press. ISBN 978-0199668977.
- Testa, Rita Lizzi (2015). "The Famous 'Altar of Victory Controversy' in Rome: The Impact of Christianity at the End of the Fourth Century". In Wienand, Johannes (ed.). Contested Monarchy: Integrating the Roman Empire in the Fourth Century AD. Oxford University Press. ISBN 978-0199768998.
- Tomlin, R. (1973). The Emperor Valentinian I. Oxford University Press.
- Vanderspoel, John (1995). Themistius and the Imperial Court: Oratory, Civic Duty, and Paideia from Constantius to Theodosius. University of Michigan Press. ISBN 978-0472104857.
- White, Cynthia (2011). The Emergence of Christianity: Classical Traditions in Contemporary Perspective. Fortress Press. ISBN 978-0472104857.
- Williams, Stephen; Friell, Gerard (1995). Theodosius: The Empire at Bay. Yale University Press. ISBN 978-0300061734.
- Martindale, John R.; Jones, A. H. M.; Morris, John, eds. (1971). "Gratianus 2". The Prosopography of the Later Roman Empire: Volume I, AD 260–395. Cambridge: Cambridge University Press. p. 401. ISBN 0-521-07233-6.

Gratian Valentinianic dynasty Born: 18 April 359 Died: 25 August 383
Regnal titles
| Preceded by Valentinian I | Roman emperor 375–383 with Valens (375–378); Valentinian II (375–383); Theodosius I (379–383); Arcadius (Jan–Aug 383) | Succeeded by Magnus Maximus |
Political offices
| Preceded by Valentinian Augustus; Valens Augustus | Roman consul 366 with Dagalaifus | Succeeded by Lupicinus; Iovinus |
| Preceded by Valentinian Augustus III; Valens Augustus III | Roman consul 371 with Sex. Claudius Petronius Probus | Succeeded by Domitius Modestus; Arinthaeus |
| Preceded by Valentinian Augustus IV; Valens Augustus IV | Roman consul 374 with Equitius | Succeeded by Valens Augustus V Valentinian junior Augustus in 376 |
| Preceded by Valens Augustus V Valentinian junior Augustus | Roman consul 377 with Merobaudes | Succeeded by Valens Augustus VI; Valentinian junior Augustus II |
| Preceded by Decimius Magnus Ausonius; Q. Clodius Hermogenianus Olybrius | Roman consul 380 with Theodosius Augustus | Succeeded by Syagrius; Eucherius |
