= Julian's Persian expedition =

War between Roman and Sasanian Empires (363)

- Part of the Roman–Persian Wars
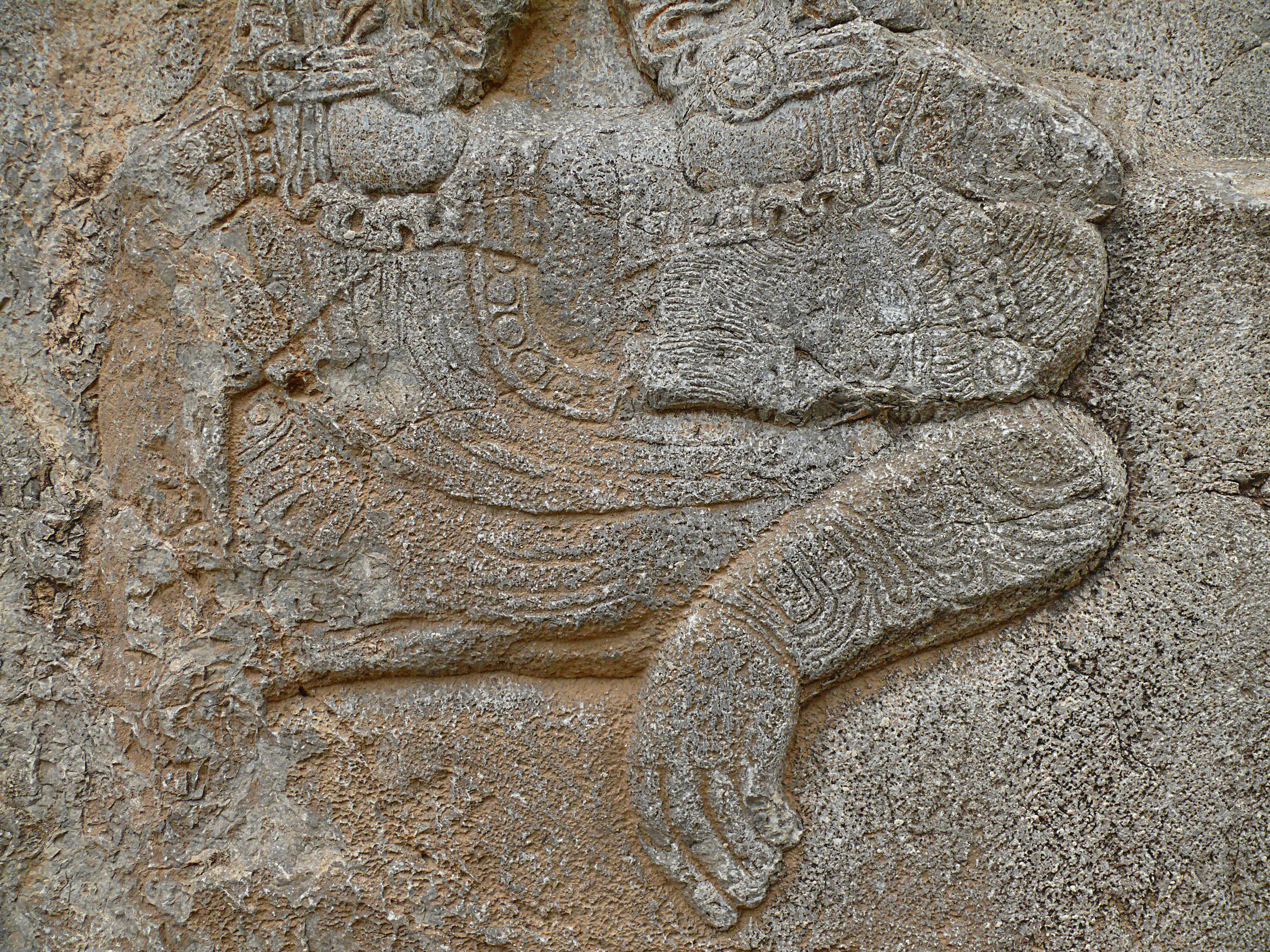
- The body of Julian, killed in battle, is trampled on by King Shapur II in a relief from Taq-e-Bostan.
Date	March–July 363 AD
Location	Mesopotamia, Armenia, and western Persia
Result	Sasanian victory
Territorial changes	Sasanian annexation of five regions and fifteen major fortresses from the Roman Empire in addition to the consequent annexation of Armenia.

Belligerents
Roman Empire; Armenia	Sasanian Empire; Arab allies

Commanders and leaders
Emperor Julian †; Emperor Jovian (surrendered); Arshak II; Hormizd; Arintheus; Victor (WIA); Dagalaifus; Nevitta; Lucillianus; Procopius Sebastianus	Shapur II; Ardashir II; Pigranes; Surena; Merena †; Nohodares †; Narseus; Podosaces; Mamersides

Strength
120,000 men: 95,000 Romans; 25,000 Armenians; 1,150 ships	Unknown, but probably fewer

Casualties and losses
Heavy	Moderate

Map of Julian's unsuccessful campaign in 363

Julian's Persian expedition took place from March to July 363 AD. It was the final military campaign to be undertaken by Roman emperor Julian, who died in battle at Samarra. The Roman Empire fought against the Sasanian Empire, which was ruled at the time by Shapur II, and sought to capture the Sasanian capital city Ctesiphon.

In order to mislead the enemy and to carry out a pincer attack, Julian sent a detachment to join with his ally Arshak II of Arsacid Armenia to take the Tigris route from the north. Meanwhile, his main army and a large fleet, facing little opposition, advanced rapidly down the Euphrates, destroying several well-fortified cities along the way. The ships then reached the walls of Ctesiphon, where a large Sasanian army had assembled in defensive positions.

The Romans won a victory outside the city, but the northern army failed to arrive, and the fortified capital seemed impregnable. Due to these complications, Julian did not attempt to besiege the city, instead burning the Roman fleet of supplies and leading a march into Persia. Shapur II's army, however, took lengths to avoid a full-scale battle and used a scorched-earth strategy, which eventually left Julian's army facing supply problems and forcing their retreat to the north. Shapur II's army pursued the retreating Romans, ceaselessly harassing the retreat through skirmishes. Julian died of wounds sustained from one of these skirmishes and was succeeded by Jovian, who agreed to surrender to the Sasanians under unfavourable terms in order to save the remnants of his demoralized and exhausted army from annihilation.

The Peace Treaty of 363 transferred multiple regions and frontier fortresses, including Nisibis and Singara, to the Sasanians. In addition to making territorial concessions, the Roman Empire renounced its alliance with Armenia, giving Shapur II the opportunity to invade and annex it.

== Aims and preparations ==
The military and political aims of the campaign are uncertain, and they are also disputed by both ancient and modern sources and historians. According to Ammianus Marcellinus, Julian's aim was to enhance his fame as a general and to punish the Persians for their invasions of Rome's eastern provinces; for this reason, he refused Shapur's immediate offer of negotiations. Julian was a devout believer in the old Roman religion. Some modern authors note that he intended to accelerate and gain support for the pagan renovation of the Roman Empire and actions against the Christians after defeating the Sasanian Empire, since such victory would have been proof of the support of the Roman gods. Among the leaders of the expedition was Hormizd, a brother of Shapur II, who had fled from the Persian Empire forty years earlier and had been welcomed by the then Roman emperor Constantine I. Julian is said to have intended to place Hormizd on the Persian throne in place of Shapur, but replacing a successful ruler with one who has been in exile for decades is an "incomprehensible" aim.

Julian asked several major oracles about the outcome of his expedition. Julian's praetorian prefect of Gaul, Sallustius, wrote advising him to abandon his plan, and numerous adverse omens were reported; at the urging of other advisers he went ahead. He instructed Arshak II of Armenia to prepare a large army, but without revealing its purpose; he sent Lucillianus to Samosata in the upper Euphrates valley to build a fleet of river ships. These preparations are thought by scholars to have suggested to Shapur that an invasion from the north, by way of the Tigris valley, was Julian's plan.

=== Advance ===
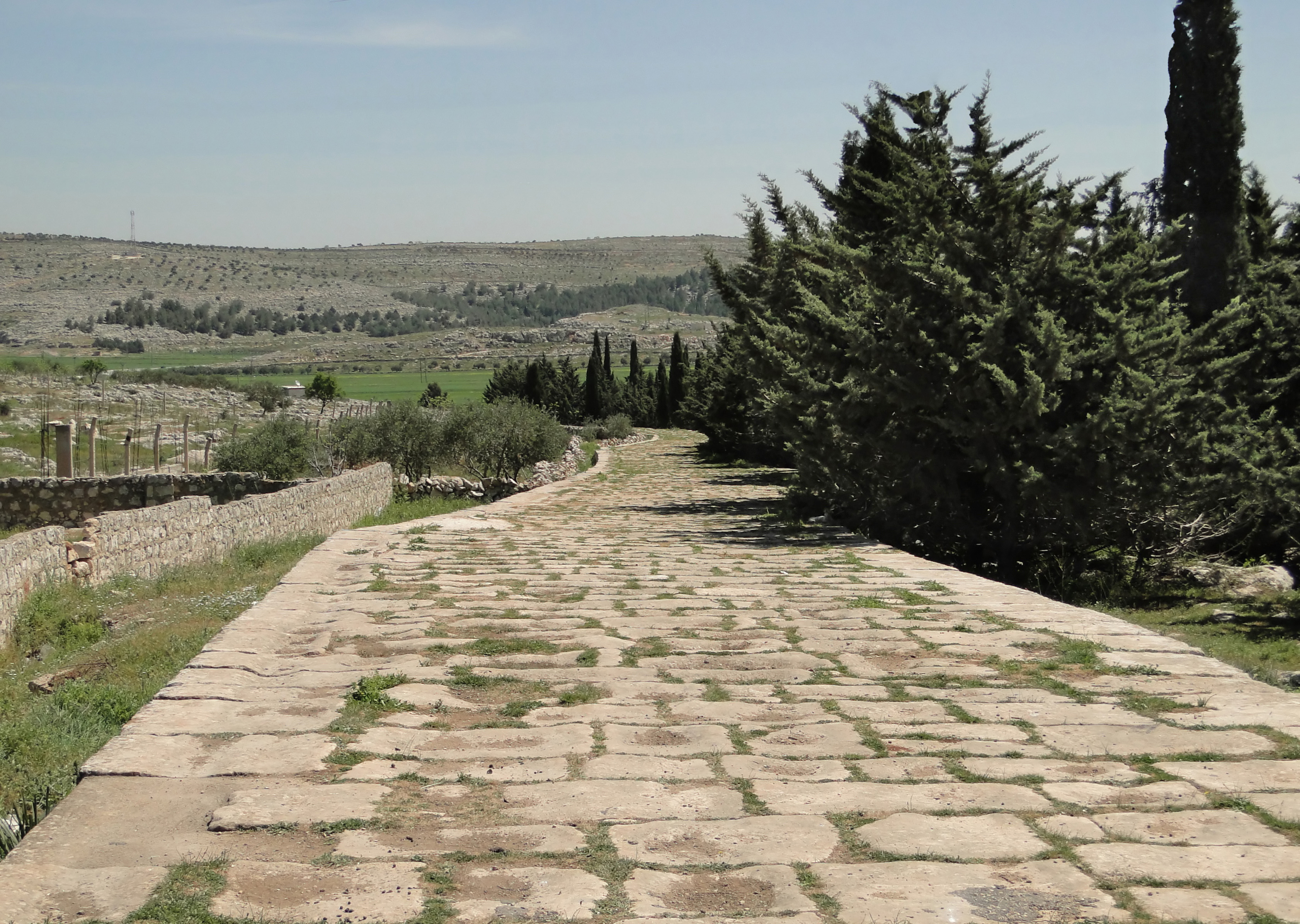
The Roman road from Antioch to Chalcis and Aleppo, the first stage of Julian's expedition

Julian had wintered at Antioch in Roman Syria. On 5 March 363, he set out north-east with his army by way of Beroea (Aleppo) and Hierapolis (Manbij), where fifty soldiers were killed when a portico collapsed while they were marching under it. The whole army mustered there, crossed the middle Euphrates and proceeded to Carrhae (Harran), the site of the famous battle in which the Roman general Crassus was defeated and killed in 53 BC. "From there two different royal highways lead to Persia," writes the eyewitness Ammianus Marcellinus: "the one on the left through Adiabene and across the Tigris; the one on the right through Assyria and across the Euphrates." Julian made use of both. He sent a detachment, which ancient sources variously estimated between 16,000 and 30,000 in strength, under Procopius and Sebastianus towards the Tigris where they were to join Arshak and his Armenian army. They were then to attack the Persians from the north. Thus, by tying Shapur down in northern Mesopotamia, Julian would have been able to quickly advance down the Euphrates without opposition, while the group in Armenia was supposed to join up with Julian in Assyria. Many modern scholars have praised the choice of routes, rapid movements, and deception, while some consider the plan to be inadequate with regard to supply, communication, climate consideration, and the difficulty of crossing between Euphrates and Tigris near Naarmalcha.

Julian himself, with the larger part of his army of 65,000, of which it is unclear whether that was before or after Procopius' departure, turned south along the Balikh River towards the lower Euphrates, reaching Callinicum (al-Raqqah) on 27 March and meeting the fleet of 1,100 supply vessels and 50 armed galleys under the command of Lucillianus. There he was met by leaders of the "Saraceni" (Arab nomads), who offered Julian a gold crown. He refused to pay the traditional tribute in return; though he later requested their envoys join him. The army followed the Euphrates downstream to the border city of Circesium and crossed the river Aboras (Khabur) with the help of a pontoon bridge constructed for the purpose.

== Progress of the war ==
=== From Circesium to Ctesiphon ===
Once over the border, Julian invigorated the soldiers' ardor with a fiery oration, representing his hopes and reasons for the war, and distributed a donative of 130 pieces of silver to each. The army was divided on the march into three principal divisions. The center under Victor, composed of the heavy infantry; the cavalry under Arintheus and Hormizd the renegade Persian on the left; the right, marching along the riverbank and maintaining contact with the fleet, consisting likewise of infantry, and commanded by Nevitta. The baggage and the rearguard were under Dagalaifus, while the scouts were led by Lucilianus, the veteran of Nisibis. A detachment was left to hold the fortress of Circesium, as several of the fickle Arabian tribes near the border were allied with Persia.

Julian then penetrated rapidly into Assyria. Similarly to the concentration of Egypt's population on the Nile was the main part of the population of Assyria located in the towns on the banks of the Euphrates, while the interior of the country was, for the most part, a desert wasteland. The first Persian settlement that was encountered was Anatha (Anah), which surrendered, but the Romans destroyed it. The army then moved past the Thilutha (Telbis Island, now flooded by the Haditha Dam) and Achaiachala (variously identified with Haditha or Bijân Island, the latter is now flooded by the Haditha Dam), since both of them were difficult to capture. A part of the army crossed over at Baraxmalcha. Then they reached Diacira (Hit) and then Ozogardana/Zaragardia, both of which were abandoned and Julian destroyed them. Then the Romans met a Sasanian detachment for the first time and defeated it. After Macepracta/Besechana, which was reached by a march of two weeks, Julian's army besieged Pirisabora (Anbar), the largest city of Mesopotamia after Ctesiphon. The city was surrendered after two or three days and was destroyed. Julian used the nearby Naarmalcha (the Royal Canal), which was the most direct route, to transfer the fleet from the Euphrates to Tigris. The army moved southeast with great difficulties and losses. Worse still, the Persians flooded the land by destroying the dams and diverting the water of the Naarmalcha canal after the Romans passed Phissenia. Julian's army then reached Bithra. Arriving within a dozen miles of Ctesiphon, the fortified Maiozamalcha was besieged and taken after several days through mining operations. The city was destroyed and almost all inhabitants were killed. Through Meinas Sabatha, Julian marched towards the Seleucia–Ctesiphon metropolis (Al-Mada'in).

Arshak II's preparations in Armenia might have deceived Shapur II, but he must have been soon informed of the advance of the main Roman army along the Euphrates. Modern scholars have noted this avoidance of a full-scale field battle and letting the main Roman army advance deep into Assyria.

=== Ctesiphon ===
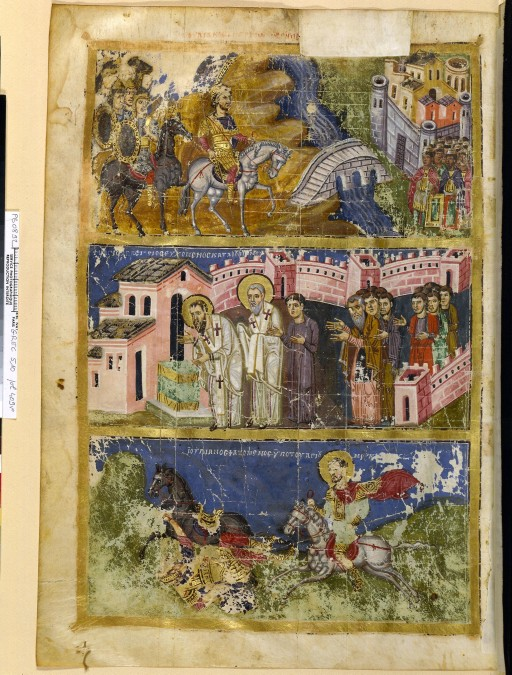
9th-century painting of Julian near Ctesiphon

After destroying the private residence, palaces, gardens and extensive menagerie of the Persian monarchy north of Ctesiphon, and securing his position by improvised fortifications, Julian turned his attention to the city itself. The twin cities of Ctesiphon and Seleucia (rebuilt as Veh-Ardashir) lay before Julian to the south. In order to invest the place on both sides, Julian first dug a canal between the Euphrates and Tigris, allowing his fleet to enter the latter river, and by this means ferried his army to the further bank. A large Persian army had assembled in Ctesiphon, which was the appointed place of rendezvous for Shapur's army at the outset of the campaign; this was arrayed along the eastern bank in strong defensive positions, and it required the advantages of night-time and surprise, and subsequently a prolonged struggle on the escarpment, reportedly lasting twelve hours, to gain the passage of the river. But in the contest victory lay ultimately with the Romans, and the Persians were driven back within the city walls after sustaining losses of twenty-five hundred men; Julian's casualties are given at no more than 70.

Though Julian had brought with him through Assyria a large train of siege engines and offensive weapons, and he was supplied by an active fleet that possessed the undisputed navigation of the river, the Romans appear to have been at some difficulty in putting Ctesiphon to the siege. Although it had fallen on several previous occasions to the Romans, the city was better fortified than in the second century.

Confronted with the difficulty to capture the city, Julian called a council of war, at which it was decided not to besiege the city and march into Persia's interior instead—a turning point of the campaign. Apparently, it met with resistance within the army. The reasons for this decision are uncertain; according to Ammianus, it was due to the fear of a two-front war, since Shapur II's army was apparently nearby. According to Libanios, Shapur II sent an emissary to Julian, who refused it. After abandoning the siege, Julian burned his fleet of provisions to avoid its fall into the Sasanians' hands, as Julian's army now had to move upstream. Another theory is that Julian was deceived by Sasanian deserters. Julian was possibly still hoping to join up with the reinforcements from Armenia and then defeat Shapur II's army in a regular battle.

It is possible the intention was justified by the hope of destroying the army of Shapur before the latter should join with the already numerous garrison of Ctesiphon to besiege the camp of the besiegers. More inexplicable is the burning of the fleet, and most of the provisions, which had been transported the whole course of the Euphrates with such monumental cost. Although ancient and modern historians have censured the rashness of the deed, Edward Gibbon palliates the folly by observing that Julian expected a plentiful supply from the harvests of the fertile territory by which he was to march, and, with regard to the fleet, that it was not navigable up the river, and must be taken by the Persians if abandoned intact. Meanwhile, if he retreated northward with the entire army immediately, his already considerable achievements would be undone, and his prestige irreparably damaged, as one who had obtained success by stratagem and fled upon the resurgence of the foe. There were therefore no negligible reasons for his abandonment of the siege, the fleet, and the safe familiarity of the river bank.

=== Ctesiphon to Samarra ===
After spending several days outside Ctesiphon, Julian directed his army toward the inner regions of Persia east of Ctesiphon. Shapur II's army avoided being dragged into battle while following a scorched earth policy by firing houses, provisions, crops and farmland wherever Julian's march approached; since the army had preserved only 20 days' provisions from the ruin of the fleet, they soon faced the threat of starvation. This together with summer heat prompted the Romans not to advance further and instead seek a route towards the Tigris and follow it upstream to the region Corduena.

At this stage, Shapur II's army appeared and began to engage Julian's army by ceaseless skirmishing. The Sasanian cavalry repeatedly assailed the Romans' extended columns in the retreat; at Maranga a sharp skirmish developed into a battle; the Sasanians were repulsed, and Julian's army retired to rest in the hills south of Samarra, on July 25, 363.

=== Samarra: Julian's death ===
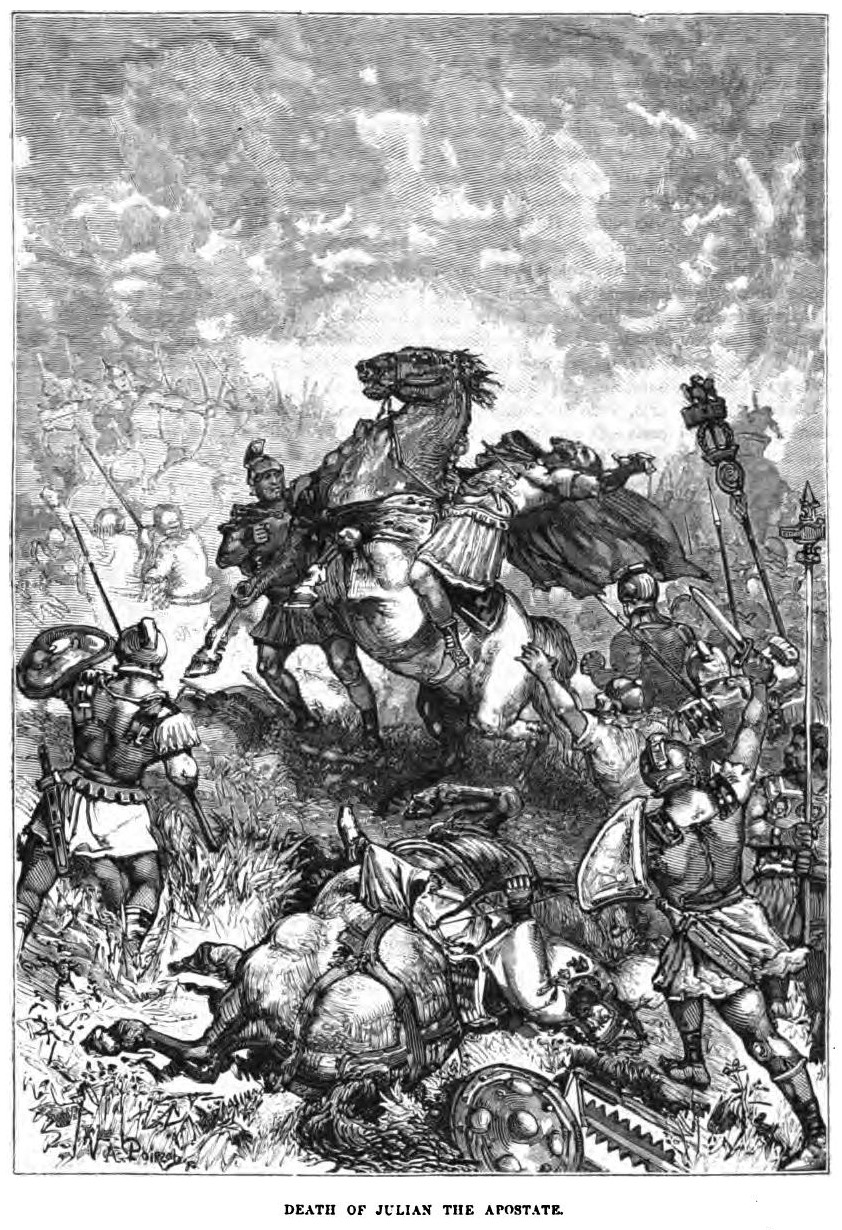
The death of Julian

The next day, 26 July, the advance resumed over the sloping hills and valleys in the arid wastelands south of modern Samarra. The heat of the day had already impelled Julian to divest himself of his helmet and protecting armor, when an alarm reached him from the rear of the column that the army was again under assault. Before the attack could be repelled, a warning from the vanguard revealed that the army was surrounded in an ambush, the Persians having stolen a march to occupy the Roman route ahead. While the army struggled to form up so as to meet the manifold threats from every side, a charge of elephants and cavalry rattled the Roman line on the left, and Julian, to prevent its imminent collapse, led his reserves in-person to shore up the defense. The light infantry under his command overthrew the massive troops of Persian heavy cavalry and elephants, and Julian, by the admission of the most hostile authorities, proved his courage in the conduct of the attack. But he had plunged into the fray still unarmored, due to the desperateness of the situation, and fell stricken from a Persian dart even as the enemy fell back. The emperor toppled to the ground off his horse and was borne in an unconscious state from the field of battle. That midnight Julian died in his tent; "Having received from the Deity", in his own words to the assembled officers, "in the midst of an honorable career, a splendid and glorious departure from the world."

The battle, which ended indecisively, raged until night-time. The emperor's death was offset by the heavy losses sustained by the Persians in their repulse on the main sector of the front but in a profound sense the battle was disastrous to the Roman cause; at best, a momentary reprieve was purchased by the loss of the stay of the army of the east and the genius of the Persian war.

== Aftermath: Jovian ==
=== Defeat: Samarra to Dura ===
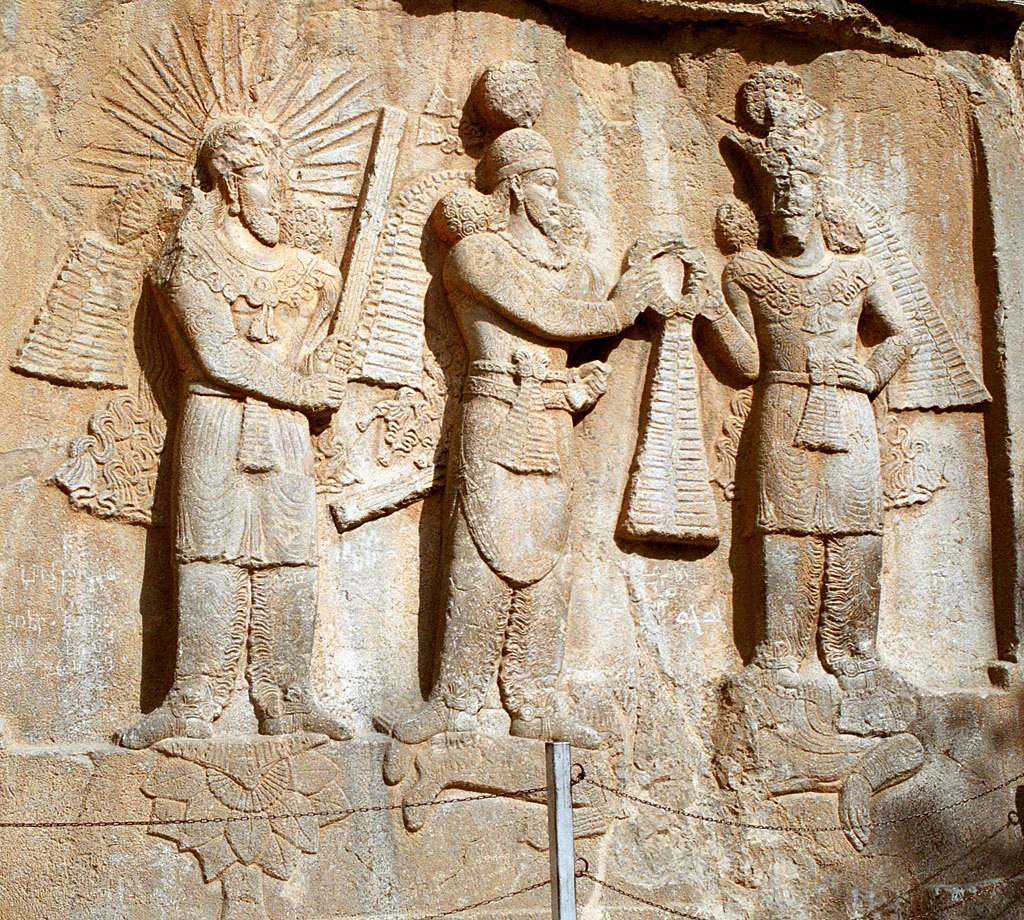
Investiture of King Ardashir II by the angelic divinity Mithra (left) and Shapur II (right); the dead body of Julian is trampled underfoot. Reliefs at Taq-e Bostan.

Within a few hours of Julian's death, his generals gathered under the necessity of determining a successor. Exigency settled on Jovian, an obscure general of the Domestic Guard, distinguished primarily for a merry heart and sociable disposition. His first command subscribed the continuation of a prompt retreat. During four further days the march was directed up the river towards Corduene and the safety of the frontier, where supplies sufficient for the famished army were expected to be obtained. The Persians, revived by knowledge of their would-be conqueror's demise, fell twice on the rear of the retreat, and on the camp, one party penetrating to the imperial tent before being cut off and destroyed at Jovian's feet. At Dura on the fourth day the army came to a halt, deluded with the vain hope of bridging the river with makeshift contraptions of timber and animal hide. In two days, after some initial appearance of success, the futility of the endeavor was proved; but while hope of a crossing was abandoned, the march was not resumed. The spirit of the army was broken, its provisions were four days from giving out, and the verges of Corduene a hundred miles further north.

=== Peace ===
At this juncture, the emissaries of Shapur II arrived in the Roman camp. According to Gibbon, Shapur was actuated by his fears of the "resistance of despair" on the part of the entrapped Roman enemy, who had come so near to toppling the Sassanian throne: conscious of the folly of refusing a peaceful but honorable settlement, obtainable at such an advantage, the Persian prudently extended the offer of peace. Meanwhile, Jovian's supplies and expedients were depleted, and in his overwhelming joy at the prospect of saving his army, his fortunes, and the empire which he later gained, he was willing to overlook the excessive harshness of the terms, and subscribe his signature to the Imperial disgrace along with the demands of Shapur II. The articles of the treaty, known to history as the treaty of Dura, stipulated the cession of Nisibis, Corduene, the four further provinces east of the Tigris which Diocletian had wrested from Persia by the Treaty of Nisibis; the Roman interest in Armenia and Iberia, as well as guaranteeing an inviolable truce of 30 years, to be warranted by mutual exchange of hostages. The frontier was peeled back from the Khabur, and most of Roman Mesopotamia, along with the elaborate chain of defensive fortresses constructed by Diocletian, conceded to the enemy. The disgraced army, after succumbing to the abject necessity of its situation, was haughtily dismissed from his dominions by Shapur, and it was left to straggle across the desolate tracts of northern Mesopotamia, until at last it rejoined the army of Procopius under the walls of Thilasapha. From here the exhausted legions retired to Nisibis, where their sorry state of deprivation was finally brought to an end.

== Consequences ==
=== Reign of Jovian; reinstatement of Christianity ===
The Army had not rested long under the walls of Nisibis, when the deputies of Shapur arrived, demanding the surrender of the city in accordance with the treaty. Notwithstanding the entreaties of the populace, and those of the remainder of the territories ceded to Shapur, as also the gossip and calumnies of the Roman people, Jovian conformed to his oath; the depopulated were resettled in Amida, funds for the restoration of which were granted lavishly by the emperor. From Nisibis Jovian proceeded to Antioch, where the insults of the citizenry at his cowardice soon drove the disgusted emperor to seek a more hospitable abode. Notwithstanding widespread disaffection at the shameful accommodation which he had made, the Roman world accepted his sovereignty; the deputies of the western army met him at Tyana, on his way to Constantinople, where they rendered him homage. At Dadastana, on February 17, 364 A.D., Jovian died of unknown causes, after a reign of merely eight months.

The death of Julian without naming a successor allowed the accession of the Christian Jovian, and thus destroyed Julian's ambitions of reestablishing Paganism, for the indisputably most consequential act of Jovian's short reign was the abolition of laws against Christianity. From Antioch he issued decrees immediately repealing the hostile edicts of Julian, which forbade Christians from teaching secular studies, and unofficially banned them from employment in the administration of the state. The exemption of the clergy from taxes and the discharge of civil obligations was reinstated; their requirement to repair the pagan temples destroyed under Constantius II recalled; and the rebuilding of the Third Temple in Jerusalem was instantly brought to a halt. At the same time, while Jovian expressed the hope that all his subjects would embrace the Christian religion, he granted the rights of conscience to all of mankind, leaving the pagans free to worship in their temples (barring only certain rites which previously had been suppressed), and freedom from persecution to the Jews.

Although very briefly under Julian, Paganism appeared to be experiencing a revival, with the restoration of numerous ancient temples and ceremonies which had fallen into decay, the revival collapsed very soon upon his death due to an intense Christian backlash. Over the succeeding years, paganism declined further and further, and an increasing portion of the subjects of Rome, especially in the cities, passed to the profession of Christianity. Under the reign of Gratian and Theodosius, less than thirty years from the Apostate's death, the practice of pagan ceremonies was formally banned by imperial decree, and the risible relic of ancient paganism passed into illegality.

=== Shapur and the fate of Armenia ===
Following this loss, Julian’s successor, Emperor Jovian, was forced to negotiate a peace settlement with the Persians, which resulted in the abandonment of Armenia, a key Roman ally. Arshak II of Armenia, Julian's ally, maintained resistance for up to four years longer, but was abandoned by his nobles, and eventually captured by Shapur. He died in captivity in Ecbatana in 371, reportedly by suicide. Without assistance from Rome, Armenia was invaded and conquered by Shapur II. The Sassanian forces launched a full-scale invasion of Armenia, besieging and looting its major cities and trading hubs.

His queen Pharantzem, who retreated to the fortress of Artogerassa, was able to save her son Pap, before she too was captured with the fall of Artogerassa. The Christian population of Armenia rose in revolt against the Zoroastrian Sasanians, and, aided by the Roman emperor Valens, Pap took the throne. When Pap was discovered in secret correspondence with Shapur, Valens attempted to have him executed. After multiple unsuccessful attempts, he had Pap assassinated at a banquet given by the Roman officer Traianus.

At the death of Shapur in 379 AD, the Persian throne passed to his brother, the moderate Ardeshir II, who sought peace. In 384, a formal treaty was signed between Theodosius I and Shapur III, son of Shapur II, which divided Armenia between the two empires, bringing an end to the independent Armenian monarchy.

== See also ==
- Siege of Pirisabora
- Siege of Maiozamalcha
- Battle of Ctesiphon (363)
- Battle of Maranga
- Battle of Samarra
- Perso-Roman Peace Treaty of 363

== Sources ==
Primary sources on the Julian's campaign are as follows:

- Ammianus Marcellinus, Res gestae 23–25
- Magnus of Carrhae FGrH 225 (fragments)
- Zosimus, Historia nova 3.12–31
- Eutropius, Breviarium 10.16
- Festus, Breviarium 28–29
- Libanius, Orations 1, 16, 17, 18, 24; Letters 737, 1367, 1402, 1508
- Ephraem Syrus, Hymns against Julian 2, 3 (Dodgeon and Lieu (1991) pp. 240–245)
- Eunapius, History after Dexippus (fragments)
- Gregory of Nazianzus, Orations 5.9–15
- Socrates Scholasticus, Historia ecclesiastica 3.21–22
- Sozomen, Historia ecclesiastica 6.1–3
- Philostorgius, Historia ecclesiastica 7.15
- Theodoret of Cyrrhus, Historia ecclesiastica 3.21–26
- Passion of Artemius 69–70 (Dodgeon and Lieu (1991) pp. 238–239)
- Chronicon Pseudo-Dionysianum year 674 = 363
- John Malalas, Chronographia 13 pp. 328–337
- Zonaras, Epitome 13.13

The course of Julian's campaign has been discussed in detail in the following commentaries and secondary sources:

- J. Fontaine, Ammien Marcellin. Histoire. Tome IV (Livres XXIII-XXV), Paris, 1977.
- J. den Boeft, J. W. Drijvers, D. den Hengst, and H. C. Teitler, Philological and Historical Commentary on Ammianus Marcellinus XXIII, Groningen, 1998
- Idem, Philological and Historical Commentary on Ammianus Marcellinus XXIV, Leiden, Boston, and Köln, 2002.
- F. Paschoud, Zosime, Histoire Nouvelle II, part 1 (Book III), Paris, 1979.
- G. Reinhardt, Der Perserkrieg des Kaisers Julian, Dessau, 1892. (in German)

However, Reinhardt's view of the sources is now considered invalid.

The route of the campaign has been discussed in the following sources:

- B. von Borries, “Iulianus (26),” in RE X 1, 1918, pp. 58–63.
- O. Seeck, Regesten der Kaiser und Päpste für die Jahre 311 bis 476 n. Chr., Stuttgart, 1919, pp. 212–213. (in German)
- F. Cumont, Etudes Syriennes. La marche de l’empereur Julien d’Antioche à l’Euphrate, Paris, 1917, pp. 1–33. (for the first part of the campaign up to Hierapolis) (in French)
- A. Musil, The Middle Euphrates. A Topographical Itinerary, American Geographical Society. Oriental Explorations and Studies 3, New York, 1927, pp. 232–242. (for the advance along the Euphrates)
- F. Paschoud, "Der Feldzug Iulians gegen die Sāsāniden (363)", in Tübinger Atlas des Vorderen Orients, B VI 4, Wiesbaden, 1984. (in German)
- F. Paschoud, Zosime, Histoire Nouvelle II, part 1 (Book III), Paris, 1979, maps 2 and 3.

However, Musil's identifications have now met with skepticism.

== Bibliography ==
- R. Andreotti, "L'impresa di Iuliano in Oriente" in Historia vol. 4 (1930) pp. 236–273
- Timothy D. Barnes, Ammianus Marcellinus and the Representation of Historical Reality (Ithaca: Cornell University Press, 1998. ISBN 0-8014-3526-9) pp. 164–165
- Glen Warren Bowersock, Julian the Apostate (Cambridge, Mass.: Harvard University Press, 1978. ISBN 0-674-48881-4) pp. 106–119 Preview at Google Books
- J. den Boeft, J. W. Drijvers, D. den Hengst, H. C. Teitler, Philological and Historical Commentary on Ammianus Marcellinus XXIV. Leiden: Brill, 2002 Preview at Google Books
- Walter R. Chalmers, "Eunapius, Ammianus Marcellinus, and Zosimus on Julian's Persian Expedition" in Classical Quarterly n.s. vol. 10 (1960) pp. 152–160
- Franz Cumont, "La marche de l'empereur Julien d'Antioche à l'Euphrate" in F. Cumont, Etudes syriennes (Paris: Picard, 1917) pp. 1–33 Text at archive.org
- L. Dillemann, "Ammien Marcellin et les pays de l'Euphrate et du Tigre" in Syria vol. 38 (1961) p. 87 ff.
- M. H. Dodgeon, S. N. C. Lieu, The Roman Eastern Frontier and the Persian Wars: 363–628 AD: a narrative sourcebook (London: Routledge, 1991) pp. 231–274 Preview (with different page numbers) at Google Books
- Ch. W. Fornara, "Julian's Persian Expedition in Ammianus and Zosimus" in Journal of Hellenic Studies vol. 111 (1991) pp. 1–15
- Edward Gibbon, The Decline and Fall of the Roman Empire, The Modern Library, 1932, New York. Chap. XXIV., XXV., pp. 798–845
- David Hunt, "Julian" in Cambridge Ancient History vol. 13 (1998. ISBN 0521302005) pp. 44–77, esp. pp. 75–76 Preview at Google Books
- W. E. Kaegi, "Constantine's and Julian's Strategies of Strategic Surprise against the Persians" in Athenaeum n.s. vol. 69 (1981) pp. 209–213
- Erich Kettenhofen, "Julian" in Encyclopaedia Iranica Online (2009–2012)
- John Matthews, The Roman Empire of Ammianus (Baltimore: Johns Hopkins University Press, 1989. ISBN 9780801839658) pp. 140–161
- A. F. Norman, "Magnus in Ammianus, Eunapius, and Zosimus: New Evidence" in Classical Quarterly n.s. vol. 7 (1957) pp. 129–133
- F. Paschoud, ed., Zosime: Histoire nouvelle. Vol. 2 pars 1. Paris: Les Belles Lettres, 1979 (Collection Budé)
- David S. Potter, The Roman Empire at Bay: AD 180–395 (London: Routledge, 2004. ISBN 9780415100571) pp. 518 et 720 Preview at Google Books
- R. T. Ridley, "Notes on Julian's Persian Expedition (363)" in Historia vol. 22 (1973) pp. 317–330 esp. p. 326
- Gerhard Wirth, "Julians Perserkrieg. Kriterien einer Katastrophe" in Richard Klein, ed., Julian Apostata (Darmstadt, 1978) p. 455 ff.
