= Surena (4th century) =

Iranian Military Officer

Surena (also spelled Suren) was a 4th-century Iranian military officer active during the reign of the Sasanian king (shah) Shapur II (r. 309–379). He played an important role in the defeat of the Roman invasion in 363 and the peace negotiations that followed.

== Biography ==
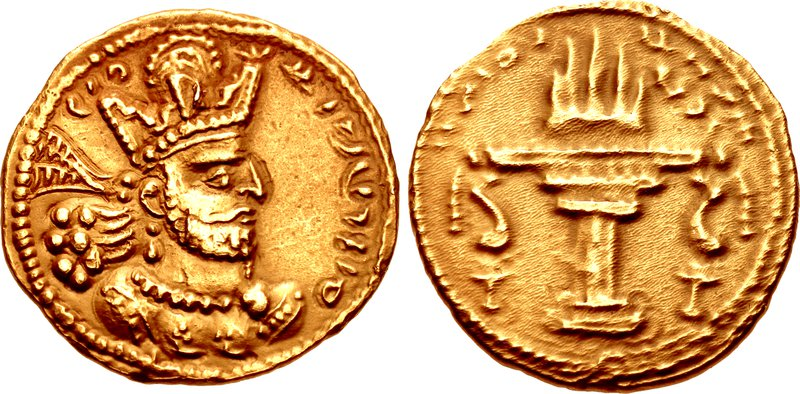
Coin of Shapur II.

Map of Julian's unsuccessful campaign in 363.

Surena was a member of the House of Suren, one of the Seven Great Houses of Iran. The family, of Parthian origin, had been active in Iranian politics since the Arsacid Empire, and held parts of Sakastan as their personal fiefdom. Surena was seemingly a powerful figure in the country, being described as "second in power after the king." He is first mentioned in 363, when he on April 24 ambushed a patrol force led by Hormizd, a brother of Shapur II, who had entered the service of the Roman emperor Julian (r. 361–363). Hormizd only managed to escape due to the overflow of the Euphrates which proved too much for Surena and his men. The following day after the Roman sack of Pirisabora, Surena ambushed three squadrons of the Roman cavalry, killing some of them, including one of the tribunes, and also captured an aquila.

At the battle of Ctesiphon on May 29, Pigranes, Narseus and Surena were defeated by the Romans and as a result forced to retreat into the city walls. After the death of Julian the following month at Samarra, Surena, who was at the time in Nor Shirakan, was sent with another nobleman to negotiate peace with the Romans. Upon arriving at the Roman camp, they were greeted by the newly declared emperor Jovian (r. 363–364), who made Flavius Arinthaeus his mediator for the peace agreement between the two parties. The treaty was called an ignobili decreto ("shameful treaty") by Romans, who had to concede eastern Mesopotamia, Armenia, and the surrounding regions, counting fifteen castles and the important city of Nisibis, which had its Christian population moved to Roman soil.

== Bibliography ==
=== Ancient works ===
- Ammianus Marcellinus, Res Gestae.
- Faustus of Byzantium, History of the Armenians.

=== Modern works ===
- Brunner, Christopher (1983). "Geographical and Administrative divisions: Settlements and Economy". The Cambridge History of Iran: The Seleucid, Parthian, and Sasanian periods (2). Cambridge: Cambridge University Press. pp. 747–778. ISBN 978-0-521-24693-4.
- Daryaee, Touraj (2009). "SHAPUR II". Encyclopaedia Iranica.
- Dodgeon, Michael H.; Greatrex, Geoffrey; Lieu, Samuel N. C. (2002). The Roman Eastern Frontier and the Persian Wars (Part I, 226–363 AD). Routledge. ISBN 0-415-00342-3.
- Greatrex, Geoffrey; Lieu, Samuel N. C. (2005). The Roman Eastern Frontier and the Persian Wars AD 363-628. Routledge. ISBN 978-1134756469.
- Shahbazi, A. Shapur (2004). "Hormizd (2)". Encyclopaedia Iranica, Vol. XII, Fasc. 5. pp. 461–462.
