= Battle of Maranga =

- Part of Julian's Persian expedition
- A map of the campaign up to the battle of Samarra
Date	363 CE
Location	Maranga, Mesopotamia
Result	Roman victory

Belligerents
Eastern Roman Empire	Sassanid Empire

Commanders and leaders
Julian	Merena

Casualties and losses
Minimal	Unknown

The Battle of Maranga occurred in 363, shortly after the Battle of Ctesiphon. The Romans repelled a Sasanian attack while sustaining minimal losses. However, the army's lack of supplies continued to threaten the army, and soon afterwards the emperor Julian was killed at the Battle of Samarra.

== Background ==
After defeating the Persians in battle on the banks of the Tigris and surrounding the capital, Ctesiphon, Julian soon became convinced of his inability to take the city. The apparent impregnability of Ctesiphon, along with his desire to defeat Shapur the Persian king in battle, resolved Julian to abandon the siege. The river fleet which had accompanied the march of the army was abandoned to the flames, and Julian, relying on the fertility of the country for provisions for the troops, ordered the baggage train to be burnt, only 20 days' supplies being preserved. The army then proceeded inland, guided by native captives, who however took care to supply the emperor with misinformation and faulty councils, while Shapur fired the country, harassed the enemies' scouts, and dexterously eluded his main army. Incapable of forcing a battle, Julian fell back on the Tigris, resolved on a retreat north-westwards to the Roman province of Corduene, before his scanty and rotting provisions should run out.

== Battle ==
The Persians, who had assembled a very numerous army, now closed upon the rear of the Romans. Julian's march was continually harassed, and the fighting at Maranga reached the proportions of a battle. Although the Persians were rebuffed and Julian's retreat was enabled to proceed, the losses were considerable on his side as well, and the retardation of his march contributed to weakening the army whose provisions were on the verge of giving out.

== Aftermath ==
The subsequent death of Julian in the action of Samarra, which was similarly a tactical success for the Romans, contributed to lower the morale of the troops, and the emperor Jovian, whom they elected in the camp as Julian's successor, was brought by the threat of famine and the Persian army to conclude a disgraceful peace with Shapur II, conceding all the gains of the treaty of Diocletian (298), and important border fortresses such as Nisibis and Singara, as well.
