= Maogamalcha =

Maogamalcha or Maiozamalcha was a fortress located in Mesopotamia. It was attacked and taken by the Roman Emperor Julian (Ammianus Marcellinus xxiv. 4.). It appears to have been strongly fortified and well defended. Zosimus evidently alludes to the same place, though he does not mention it by name, and states it was about 90 stadia from Ctesiphon (Zosimus iii.21). The fortress of Maogamalcha is described as having sixteen large towers or bastions, the solid walls were made of brick and bitumen. Along the walls was a deep ditch which prevented armies from actually climbing into the fortifications. It was constructed at a distance of eleven miles, in the outskirts far from the capital of Persia. After taking the fortress Emperor Julian ordered for the governor to be burnt alive, on the grounds that he had uttered disrespectful words against Hormisdas.
