= Arintheus =

4th-century AD Roman general

Flavius Arintheus
- Died: AD 378
- Occupations: Military officer and politician
- Years active: 354–378
- Office: Consul (372)
- Children: 1 daughter

Military service
- Rank: Magister peditum
- Battles/wars: Campaign against the Alemanni; Julian's Persian expedition • Battle of Ctesiphon; Armenian campaign Gothic War (367–369)

Flavius Arintheus (or Arinthaeus; died AD 378) was a Roman army officer who started his career in the middle ranks and rose to senior political and military positions. He served the emperors Constantius II, Julian, Jovian and Valens. In 372 he was appointed consul, alongside Domitius Modestus.

Arintheus served under Constantius during his campaign against the Alemanni, 354–5, under Julian in his Persian campaign, 363, and under Valens in the First Gothic War, 367–9, and Armenia, 370. He was one of the clique of senior officers who elected Jovian to the throne, and may have played a similar role in the election of Valentinian. He died in 378 while serving as magister peditum, one of the two most senior military positions of the Roman Empire.

== Early career ==
Probably a Goth, Arintheus began his career as a military officer. In 354–5 Arintheus served as a tribune, a middle-ranking officer, in Raetia. He belonged to one of the legions which accompanied Emperor Constantius II on his campaign against the Alemanni, where Arintheus was instrumental in securing a victory against the enemy in difficult circumstances. In 355 Constantius elevated his cousin Julian to the rank of caesar with authority over the Western Empire. Meanwhile, Arintheus rose through the ranks, becoming a civilian court official under Constantius. In 360 Julian revolted and proclaimed himself emperor. In 361, taking advantage of a pause in the ongoing war against the Sassanid Persian Empire, Constantius marched against Julian. Arintheus accompanied Constantius, but shortly after setting out the forty-four-year-old Emperor died of natural causes and civil war was averted.

Arintheus is next mentioned in AD 363, as a comes rei militaris, a senior military position. He accompanied the new emperor on his Persian campaign. Julian had gathered an army of 65,000 men, and advanced into the heart of Persian territory. Arintheus was put in charge of the cavalry on the left wing during the advance into Mesopotamia, responsible for screening the main army from the Persians. He repulsed at least one attack by the Persians during this part of the campaign. He commanded an infantry force during Julian's victory outside the walls of the Persian capital Ctesiphon. Afterwards he led his forces in ravaging the countryside and pursuing what Persians he could find. As the city was considered impregnable Julian moved north, aiming to join up with a large Roman detachment commanded by Procopius and Sebastianus. Julian was mortally wounded in a skirmish.

Map showing Julian's campaign of 363

Arintheus and a number of other court officials who had served under Constantius began looking among their number for a replacement, but were opposed by the officers who had served under Julian in the west. Eventually the joint officers, including Arintheus, agreed to the elevation of Secundus Salutius. Salutius was the praetorian prefect of the East, second only to the Emperor in this area, and had been a senior advisor to both Constantius and Julian. Salutius refused, on the grounds of old age and a lack of military experience. The sources are unclear as to what happened next; there is a suggestion that the impatient junior officers forced the hand of their seniors, even that the throne was mistakenly offered to an officer with a similar name to the one intended. In any event, Arintheus and the other commanders, deep in enemy territory and attempting a difficult retreat, agreed on Jovian, a tribune of the Palace Guard, who became the Emperor Jovian. Jovian kept much of Julian's senior staff intact, and Arintheus retained his position.

The army continued to retreat but ran short of supplies and was trapped by the Persians on the wrong bank of the Tigris at Dura. Jovian sent Arintheus and Salutius to negotiate a truce with the Sassanid emperor, Shapur II. The negotiations lasted four days, and saw Arintheus and Salutius agree a treaty whereby the Romans gave up five satrapies on the eastern side of the Tigris River, and abandoned control of eastern Mesopotamia, including the vital border fortress of Nisibis. Rome also abandoned its ally Armenia. In exchange, the Roman army was supplied and assisted on its way and Jovian was recognised as Roman emperor. On their way back from the east, Jovian dispatched Arintheus to Gaul, where he was ordered to confirm Jovinus as the magister equitum, or senior military commander.

== Service under Valens ==
Jovian died before reaching Constantinople, the Roman capital. The army's commanders gathered again, at Nicaea, with civilian officials from the capital. It is not known if Arintheus was present at this meeting, but he supported its choice, Valentinian. He was transferred to the court of Valentinian's brother and co-emperor, Valens, at Constantinople. Valens immediately moved east to make a show of force to any Persians tempted to take advantage of the imperial confusion. Arintheus went with him. Part way to the border they learnt that ex-general Procopius had proclaimed himself rightful emperor and seized the capital. Most of Valens's troops had already crossed into Syria, which allowed Procopius to gain control of the provinces of Asia and Bithynia, winning increased support for the insurrection. Valens dispatched the available legions under veteran generals Arintheus and Arbitio to march on Procopius. On the border of Bithynia and Galatia Arintheus confronted an army commanded by Hyperechius, an ally of Procopius, and convinced the rebellious soldiers to defect to Valens. Procopius fled, but was soon captured and executed. Valens appointed Arintheus magister peditum, a senior military position, which he held until his death.

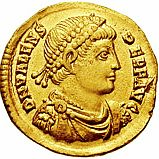
Emperor Valens

Arintheus then accompanied Valens during the First Gothic War from 367 to 369. In 368 he was dispatched to harass the Thervingi in Gothia, with his soldiers rewarded with a gold coin for every barbarian head they brought back. The following year Arintheus was asked to negotiate a peace with King Athanaric of the Goths, and was then promptly dispatched to the Persian frontier.

After spending the end of 369 and early 370 repairing the road between Amaseia and Satala, he marched into Armenia with an armed force to re-install Papas (Pap) on the throne of Armenia. Shapur II had invaded Armenia shortly before, but Arintheus was able to force him out with little fighting, and to curtail Papas's attempts to come to an agreement with the Sassanid emperor. Arintheus remained in Armenia throughout 371.

During the following year Arintheus was appointed consul, serving alongside Domitius Modestus. Becoming a consul was the highest honour of the Roman state, and as such candidates were chosen carefully by the emperor. It is notable that one of the consuls who preceded him was the son of Emperor Valentinian and that the pair of consuls for the following year were the co-emperors Valentinian and Valens.

In 377 magister peditum Traianus fought a bloody and inconclusive battle against the Goths known as the Battle of the Willows. Valens accused Traianus of cowardice, but thanks to the support of Arintheus and magister equitum Victor, Traianus was able to put the blame on Valens' persecution of the Nicenians.

Arintheus died in 378. He was baptised a Christian on his deathbed. He was married and had at least one daughter. He was a correspondent of Basil of Caesarea, also called Saint Basil the Great. As a supporter of Orthodox Christianity he was alleged to have confronted the emperor Valens over his Arianism.

== See also ==
- Gothic War (376–382)

== Footnotes ==
=== References ===
- Boeft, J. Den, Philological and Historical Commentary on Ammianus Marcellinus XXIV (2002)
- Gibbon, Edward (1932). The Decline and Fall of The Roman Empire. New York: The Modern Library. OCLC 632071283.
- Lenski, Noel Emmanuel, Failure of Empire: Valens and the Roman State in the Fourth Century A.D. (2002)
- Lieu, N. C. Samuel (1998). Constantine: History, Historiography, and Legend. London; New York: Routledge. ISBN 978-0-415-10747-1.
- Martindale, J. R.; Jones, A. H. M, The Prosopography of the Later Roman Empire', Vol. I AD 260–395, Cambridge University Press (1971)
- Mitchell, Stephen (2007). A History of the Later Roman Empire. Oxford; Malden MA.: Blackwell. ISBN 978-1-4051-0857-7.
- Norwich, John Julius (1990). Byzantium: The Early Centuries. London: Penguin. ISBN 978-0-14-011447-8.

Political offices
Preceded by Gratian Augustus II; Sex. Claudius Petronius Probus	Roman consul 372 with Domitius Modestus	Succeeded by Valentinian Augustus IV; Valens Augustus IV
