= Victor (magister equitum) =

Roman army officer and politician

Victor (fl. 362–383) was a Roman military officer and politician, who served the emperors Constantius II, Julian, Jovian and Valens. He was appointed consul in AD 369, alongside Valentinianus Galates.

== Early career and Julian's Persian campaign ==
Born into a Sarmatian family, Victor served at the court of the emperor Constantius II as a palace official. Under Julian the Apostate, Victor was appointed Comes rei militaris, a position he held from AD 362 – 363. In anticipation of the campaign against the Sassanid Empire, Julian had Victor march the Roman army from Constantinople to Antioch. When Julian arrived to take command of the expedition, Victor was placed in charge of the rearguard. On the road to Ctesiphon, he scouted ahead to ensure there were no traps laid by the Persians, and at the Battle of Ctesiphon, he led the vanguard across the river, scattering a force of Persians led by the son of king Shapur II.

Victor and his fellow generals then tried to convince Julian not to cross the canal, but Julian ordered him to cross and to engage the enemy, whereupon Victor was forced to pull back after meeting stiff resistance. A second engagement forced the Persians back to the walls of Ctesiphon, during which Victor was wounded in the shoulder. He prevented his soldiers from entering the city in pursuit of the retreating Persians.

After Julian's death following the Battle of Samarra, Victor and a number of other court officials who had served under Constantius began looking among their number for a replacement, but were opposed by Julian's Gallic officers. Eventually Victor and the rest agreed to the elevation of Salutius, who refused the nomination, and they were forced to accept the elevation of Jovian. Jovian promoted Victor to the rank of Magister equitum in AD 363, a post he held until AD 379.

== Career under Valens ==
With the death of Jovian, Valentinian I was elected as the new emperor, and eventually Victor was assigned to the eastern court of Valentinian's brother and co-emperor Valens. In AD 366/7, Valens sent him to question the Goths who had supported the rebellion of the usurper Procopius, while at the same time assess the accuracy of reports of their restlessness and their war readiness. In AD 369, he was sent together with Arintheus to negotiate a peace with the Goths to end Valens’ first Gothic War. That same year, Valens rewarded Victor for his services by appointing him consul alongside Valens' three-year-old son, Valentinianus Galates.

In AD 377, Victor was dispatched to Persia by Valens to negotiate with the Sassanids over the disputed territory of Armenia. These discussions were abruptly called off when Victor was recalled as a result of the outbreak of the new Gothic War, and the Gothic incursions into Thrace. Joining Valens, he advised the emperor to wait for reinforcements from his imperial colleague, Gratian, before proceeding to the Battle of Adrianople, but his advice was ignored. During the battle, he attempted unsuccessfully to rescue Valens, who died on the battlefield. Victor, however, did manage to withdraw his troops intact, and after the battle he crossed from Macedonia to Pannonia, to bring news of the defeat to the emperor Gratian.

By AD 380/1 Victor had retired from public life and was residing at Constantinople, where he owned a property in the suburb of Psamathea, and he was still alive in AD 382/3.

Victor was a staunch supporter of Catholicism, and reputedly confronted the Arian emperor Valens prior to his campaign at Adrianople, declaring that the emperor was incurring God's wrath by his persecution of Catholics. He probably interceded on behalf of Basil of Caesarea, whom Valens had prepared orders to banish, but in the end had never issued. Victor was also instrumental in limiting Valens' push to bring the province of Cappadocia into the Arian fold.

Victor was married to Chasidat or Khasidat, the daughter of the Arab Queen Mavia of the Arab Tanukh. He was also an acquaintance of the rhetorician Libanius.

== Sources ==
- Martindale, J. R.; Jones, A. H. M, The Prosopography of the Later Roman Empire, Vol. I AD 260–395, Cambridge University Press (1971)

Political offices
| Preceded by Valentinian Augustus II; Valens Augustus II | Roman consul 369 with Valentinianus Galates | Succeeded by Valentinian Augustus III; Valens Augustus III |
