= Mawiyya =

Syrian Arab warrior-queen of the Tanukhid confederation (died 425)

Mavia

Queen of the Tanukh
- Reign: 375–425
- Predecessor: al-Hawari (her husband)
- Died: 425
- Burial: Anasartha (modern Syria)
Names
- Mawiyya
- House: Tanukhids

Mawiyya (from Arabic: ماوية, romanized: Māwiyya, in Ancient Greek: Μαβία, romanized: Māvia), also transliterated Mawia, Mawai, or Mawaiy, and sometimes referred to as Mavia of Tanukh) was an Arab queen, who ruled over the Tanukhids, a confederation of semi-nomadic Arabs, in southern Syria, in the latter half of the fourth century. She led her troops in a rebellion against Valens, riding at the head of her army into Phoenicia and Palestine. After she reached the frontiers of Egypt and repeatedly defeated the Roman army, the Romans finally made a truce with her on conditions she stipulated. Following her victory, Mawiyya was powerful enough to be able to dictate the terms of negotiations, and demanded that a certain orthodox Christian monk, Moses, be named as bishop over her people. The Romans later called upon her for assistance when being attacked by the Goths, to which she responded by sending a force of cavalry.

Considered to be "the most powerful woman in the late antique Arab world after Zenobia" much of what is known about Mawiyya comes from early, almost contemporaneous accounts, such as the writings of Rufinus, thought to be derived from a now lost account by Gelasius of Caeserea. Later authors transformed her into a Christian of Roman stock, though she was evidently Arab, and perhaps initially pagan.

== Biography ==
The ancestors of Mavia, whose Arabic name was Mawiyya, were Tanukhids, a loose affiliation of Arab tribes that migrated northwards from the Arabian Peninsula a century before Mawiyya was born, because of growing Sasanian influence in Eastern Arabia. Mawiyya's husband was al-Hawari, the last king of the semi-nomadic Tanukh confederation in southern Syria in the latter half of the fourth century, and the confederation served in the role of foederati, guarding key trade routes for the empire. When he died in 375 AD without leaving an heir, Mawiyya rose to command the confederation in a revolt against Roman rule that extended throughout the Levant.

The reasons for the revolt are thought to have been religious. After al-Hawari's death, the Roman emperor Valens, an Arian heterodox, decided to disregard the requests of the Arabs for an orthodox bishop, insisting on the appointment of an Arian bishop instead. Mawiyya withdrew from Aleppo into the desert with her people, forming alliances with desert Arabs and gaining support throughout much of Arabia and Syria, in preparation for the fight against Roman rule. It is unclear as to whether Mawiyya herself was Christian at this time or not. Some historians report that it was during her military exploits that she met an ascetic monk who so impressed her that she converted to orthodox Christianity. All agree, however, that the conditions she set for any truce with Rome, was this monk's appointment as bishop over her people.

=== Details of the revolt ===
It was in the spring of 378 AD that Mawiyya launched the massive revolt against the central government, often compared to that launched by Zenobia a century earlier. Her forces, which she often led personally, swept into Arabia and Palestine and reached the edges of Egypt, defeating the armies of Rome many times. Because she and the Tanukhids had left Aleppo to use the desert as their base, the Romans were left without a standing target upon which to inflict retribution. Mawiyya's highly mobile units, using classic guerilla warfare tactics, conducted numerous raids and frustrated Roman attempts to subdue the revolt.

Mawiyya and her forces proved themselves to be superior to Roman forces in open battle as well. A century of having fought alongside Roman forces meant that they were familiar with Roman tactics and easily defeated the forces of the Roman governor over Palestine and Phoenicia, the first to be sent in to crush the revolt. She gained favour among townspeople in the region, sympathetic to her cause as well, and it seemed as though the whole Roman East would break away to be ruled by Mawiyya and her Arabs.

A second force, led by the Roman military commander of the East himself, was sent out to meet Mawiyya's forces in open battle. A strong field tactician, Mawiyya personally led her forces, using a mixture of Roman and native fighting tactics, employing highly mobile cavalry carrying long lancers with devastating effect. The Romans were defeated, and unlike in their war against Zenobia, had few native allies to call upon, as one of their most valuable regional ally, the Tanukh, was the very group fighting them. Valens had no choice but to sue for peace.

==== As recorded by church historians ====
Church historians record Mawiyya's exploits, focusing in particular on the condition she set for the truce she procured from the Romans, which is considered to be important to early Christian evangelical efforts in the Levant. For example, Rufinus writes,

Mavia, queen of the Saracens, had begun to convulse the villages and towns on the border of Palestine and Arabia with a violent war and to ravage the neighboring provinces. After she had worn down the Roman army in several battles, had felled a great many, and had put the remainder to flight, she was asked to make peace, which she did on the condition already declared: that a certain monk Moses be ordained bishop for her people.

Socrates of Constantinople writes of these same events, and notes that Moses, "a Saracen by birth, who led a monastic life in the desert" had become "exceedingly eminent for his piety, faith and miracles." He suggested that Mawiyya was "therefore desirous that this person should be constituted bishop over her nation, and promised on this condition to terminate the war." Mawiyya's firm commitment to the truce, as exemplified in her marrying her daughter to Victor, the commander-in-chief of the Roman army, is also noted by Socrates.

Sozomen provides even more detail on Mawiyya referred to in his text as Mania, describing her rule, and the history of her people, whom he calls "Saracens". He writes that they are Ishmaelites, descended from the son of Hagar, Abraham's Egyptian wife at the time when His first wife Sarah, was a concubine after she was enslaved during Abraham's visit to Egypt. Of battle with "Mania, who commanded her own troops in person," Sozomen writes that it was considered "arduous" and "perilous", and that the general of the entire cavalry and infantry of the East had to be "rescued with difficulty" from battle against her and her troops by the general of the troops of Palestine and Phoenicia.

=== Aftermath ===
Moses was appointed the first Arab bishop of the Arabs, and an incipient Arab church began to emerge in the Roman East, attracting many Tanukh from Mesopotamia. Mawiyya also managed to regain the Tanukh's allied status and the privileges they enjoyed prior to Julian's reign. At the war's conclusion, Mawiyya's daughter, Princess Khasidat, was married to a devout Nicene commander in Rome's army, Victor, to cement the alliance. It was thus that Mawiyya brought the Arabs a just peace; however, it did not last long.

As part of the truce agreement, Mawiyya sent her forces to Thrace to help the Romans fight the Goths. Her forces proved less effective outside of their native territory and the Goths pushed the Romans back to Constantinople, even killing Valens, the emperor, in the process. Mawiyya's forces returned home, badly bruised and depleted in number. The new emperor, Theodosius I, favored the Goths, giving them many positions within the Roman establishment, at the expense of the Arabs. After having demonstrated their loyalty to Rome, the Arabs felt increasingly betrayed and mounted another revolt in 383 CE. This revolt was quickly put down and the Tanukh-Roman alliance ended for good, as Rome courted another Arab tribe, the Salih.

It is not known whether Mawiyya commanded this second revolt or not as there is no mention of its leadership. It is known that she died in Anasartha, east of Aleppo in the heart of the Tanukh tribal territory, where there is an inscription recording her death there in 425 AD.

== Comparisons with Zenobia ==
More recent scholarship has approached Mawiyya within the context of the history of Arab warrior queens who preceded her, most prominent among them, Zenobia. For example, Irfan Shahid notes that the armies of both queens reached the same waterway dividing Asia from Europe, with Mawiyya even crossing the Bosporus into Byzantium. Noting the absence of any mention of Mawiyya in the work of Zosimus, who was familiar with the writings of Sozomen and Socrates, Shahid concludes this omission is deliberate since it did not accord with Zosimus' thesis regarding the destructive effects of the Christianization and barbarization he associated with Constantine I's reforms. Shahid writes that, "The contrast between the careers of the two Arab queens – the first belonging to the world of the third century, pagan and disloyal to Rome, the second belonging to the new world of the fourth century, Christian and loyal – would have been attributed only to the success of the Constantinian experiment."

== See also ==
- Cleopatra VII
- Veleda
- Hypsicratea

== Bibliography ==
- Ball, Warwick (2001), Rome in the East: The Transformation of an Empire, Routledge, ISBN 0-415-11376-8
- Bowersock, Glen Warren; Brown, Peter; Brown, Peter Robert Lamont; Grabar, Oleg (1999), Late Antiquity: A Guide to the Postclassical World, Harvard University Press, ISBN 0-674-51173-5
- Anne Jensen (1996), God's Self-confident Daughters: Early Christianity and the Liberation of Women, Westminster John Knox Press, ISBN 0-664-25672-4
- Shahîd, Irfan (1984), Rome and the Arabs: A Prolegomenon to the Study of Byzantium and the Arabs, Dumbarton Oaks, ISBN 0-88402-115-7
