= Nahr Isa =

Canal between the Tigris and Euphrates rivers

The Nahr Isa (Arabic: نهر عيسى, romanized: Nahr ʿĪsā) or Isa Canal was a navigable canal that linked the two great rivers of Mesopotamia, the Euphrates and the Tigris, during the Abbasid Caliphate. It was one of the main water sources and the main avenue of river-borne commerce for the Abbasid capital of Baghdad.

== History ==
The Nahr Isa certainly has its origin in pre-Islamic times and the canal system dug by the Sasanians; a canal known as the Nahr Rufayl, attested during the time of the Muslim conquest of Persia, has been variously identified with the lower course of the Isa Canal with one of its branches in the area of Baghdad. The actual Isa Canal however was dug at the time of the founding of Baghdad in the mid-8th century by an Abbasid prince named Isa, whose exact identity is disputed: most authorities ascribed it to Caliph al-Mansur's uncle Isa ibn Ali, but the earliest source, Ibn Serapion, credits the work to al-Mansur's nephew Isa ibn Musa. No trace of it remains today.

== Course and description ==
Apart from the older Dujayl Canal to the north, which silted up in the 10th century, the Nahr Isa was the first in a sequence of navigable canals from north to south that flowed from the Euphrates to the Tigris. The Nahr Isa was followed by the Nahr Sarsar, Nahr Malik, and Nahr Kutha.

The canal began just below the city of Anbar on the Euphrates, passing a great bridge known as Qantarah Dimimma after a nearby village, close to the then small hamlet of Fallujah.

Running almost due east, it crossed the districts of Fīrūz Shābūr and Maskin, and at the town of al-Muhawwal, shortly before reaching the western outskirts of Baghdad, the Sarat Canal (Nahr al-Sarat) branched off to the left. The two canals passed on in parallel to West Baghdad, where the Sarat Canal separated the quarters of Qattrabul in the north and Baduraya in the south, before joining the Tigris directly south of the Basra Gate of the Round City of al-Mansur. The main branch of the Isa Canal turned south and then northeast in a great bend around the southern suburb of Karkh, before too joining with the Tigris at al-Fardah, the harbour of Baghdad.

Before entering Karkh, the Nahr Isa branched off into the Karkhaya Canal, which itself branched off into a number of smaller canals that criss-crossed that great suburb. The Sarat Canal had a few of branches itself: in mid-distance between its origin and the Round City the Trench of Tahir split off to the northeast, passing above the Round City; as well as the Little Sarat, which branched off from the Trench of Tahir and rejoined the main course of the Sarat.

Early 10th-century accounts describe the Nahr Isa as being crossed by nine masonry-built bridges (qanṭarah). The early 13th-century description of the canal by Yaqut al-Hamawi in his Kitāb Mu'jam al-Buldān reports that only two, Qanṭarat al-Zayyātīn and Qanṭarat al-Bustān, were still in use, but Yaqut's epitomist contradicts this in his Marāṣid, where these two are listed as destroyed, with the Qanṭarat al-Yāsiriyya, Qanṭarat al-Shawk, and Qanṭarat Banī Zurayq mentioned as still standing. On the other hand, the 12th-century scholar Ibn al-Jawzi reports that the Qanṭarat Banī Zurayq had collapsed in 1042, and was not rebuilt at the time. Another bridge, the Qanṭarat al-Ushnān was destroyed by fire a century earlier and also not rebuilt at the time.

== Importance ==
The Isa Canal provided full half of the water supplies of West Baghdad, with the Dujayl Canal providing the rest. Medieval authors stressed that "the waters of the Nahr Isa never failed, nor was its channel liable to become silted up". Conversely the canal occasionally exposed the suburbs of Baghdad to flooding, when the Euphrates overflowed. The main course of the canal formed the boundary of the suburb of Karkh, and thus also the southern city limit of Baghdad in the Middle Ages.

The canal was also an important commercial highway, part of a network of waterways that linked Baghdad to the Caliphate's provinces and the wider world. It was deep enough to be navigable, and was consequently also the main avenue for trade coming to Baghdad from the west: the trade caravans brought their goods, including food from the provinces of Syria and Egypt, to Raqqah in Upper Mesopotamia, where they were loaded onto barges and sailed down the Euphrates and the Isa Canal to the emporia of Karkh. In later times, when dams were constructed on the Sarat branch, only the main branch of the Nahr Isa remained open for traffic.

== Sources ==
- Lessner, J. (1978). "ʿĪsā, Nahr". In van Donzel, E.; Lewis, B.; Pellat, Ch. & Bosworth, C. E. (eds.). The Encyclopaedia of Islam, Second Edition. Volume IV: Iran–Kha. Leiden: E. J. Brill. pp. 86–87. doi:10.1163/1573-3912_islam_SIM_3597. OCLC 758278456.
- Le Strange, Guy (1905). The Lands of the Eastern Caliphate: Mesopotamia, Persia, and Central Asia, from the Moslem Conquest to the Time of Timur. New York: Barnes & Noble, Inc. OCLC 1044046.
- Le Strange, Guy (1922). Baghdad During the Abbasid Caliphate. From Contemporary Arabic and Persian Sources (Second ed.). Oxford: Clarendon Press.
