= Valentinianus Galates =

Son of Roman emperor Valens

- Born: 18 January 366; Galatia (possibly)
- Died: before 373; Caesarea, Cappadocia
- Dynasty: Valentinianic
- Father: Valens
- Mother: Domnica

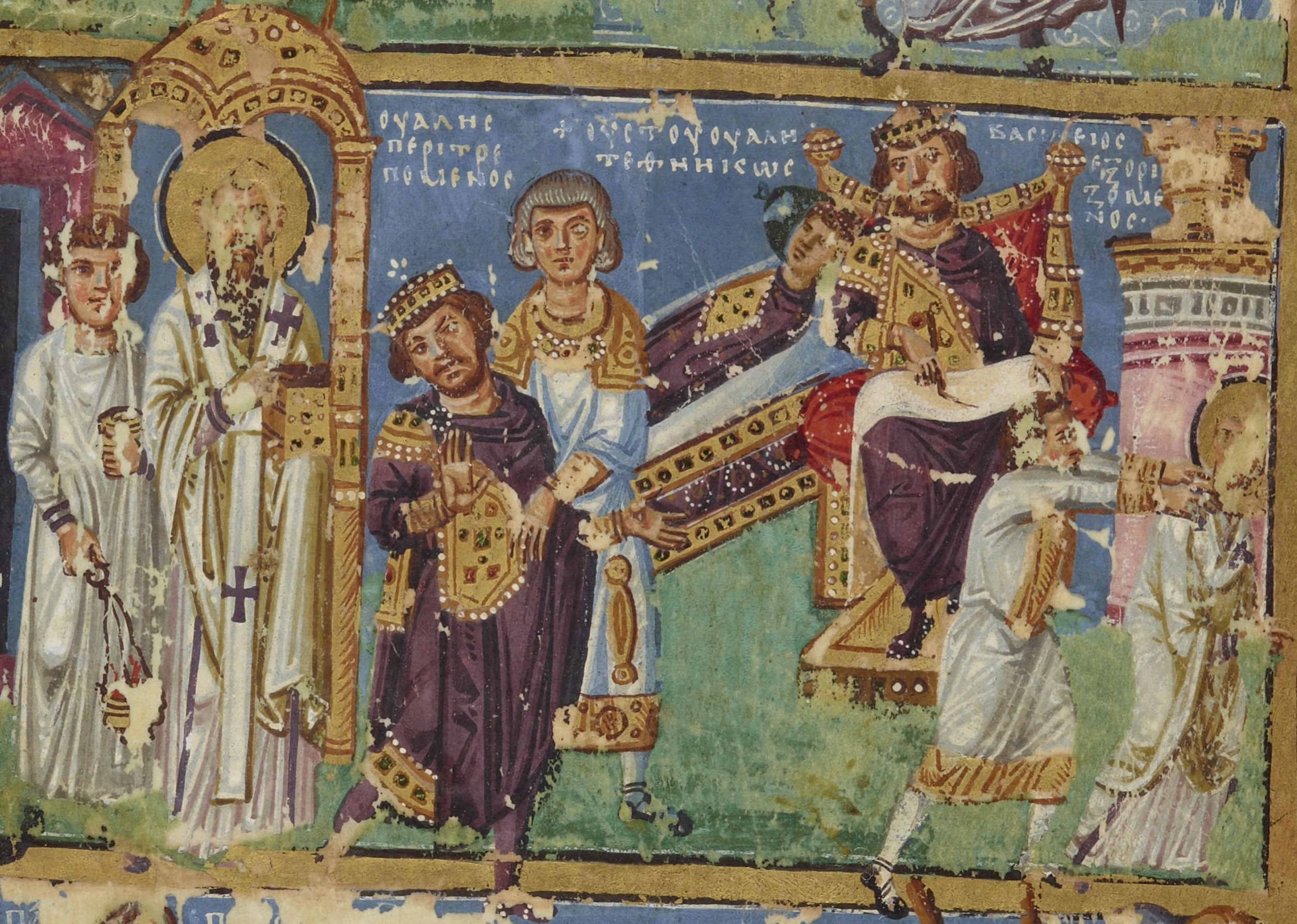
Death of Valentinianus, the son of Emperor Valens, as depicted in the 9th century Paris Gregory.

Valentinianus Galates (Greek: Ούαλεντινιανός Γαλάτης, 18 January 366 – c. 370) was the only son of the Roman emperor Valens, who ruled the Roman Empire from 364 to 378. Born into the ruling Valentinianic dynasty, Galates became Roman consul in 369, but he died in early childhood, and the empire passed to the descendants of Valentinian I, Galates's uncle, whom he was named after.

According to the 4th- and 5th-century ecclesiastical histories written by Nicene Christians, Valentinianus died as a result of his father's Arian Christianity.

== Life ==
Valentinianus was the third child of the emperor Valens and his wife Domnica, and their only son. According to the Consularia Constantinopolitana, Valentinianus was born on 18 January 366. According to the work of the contemporary orator Themistius, he was born beside the Danube, where the Danubian Limes marked the frontier of the empire.

He was possibly born in Galatia, which would explain his epithet in Ancient Greek: Γαλάτης, romanized: Galátēs, lit. 'the Galatian'. Historian Ian Hughes instead considered it to honor Valens’ success over defeating the revolt of Procopius, as it was the province from where he had launched his campaign. This name was used by the 4th-century Greek church historians Socrates Scholasticus and Sozomen and by the Chronicon Paschale. The Consularia Constantinopolitana and the Greek orations of Themistius on the other hand refer to him as Valentinianus.

According to legislation collected in the Codex Theodosianus, Valentinianus was entitled nobilissimus puer. Before his third birthday, he was appointed consul for the year 369. He was named consul prior alongside Victor, the magister equitum. As the year started, Valentinianus was probably with his father at Marcianopolis, as Valens was wintering there during his first war against the Goths.

Themistius delivered a panegyric – his Ninth Oration – on the beginning of the boy's consulship on 1 January 369. Themistius writes as though he were delivering the speech in person, but in fact it may have been sent as a text. Themistius's oration encouraged the infant Valentinianus to follow the example of his cousin Gratian, the then ten-year-old augustus of the Western Roman Empire, whom Themistius remarks is attentive to his instructors. Gratian's tutor was the Latin poet Ausonius. Themistius, a philosopher and rhetorician, suggested that he himself be appointed tutor to the young Valentinianus. He further exhorts Valentinianus to emulate the other augusti, his uncle and his father, and suggests Valentinianus is a good candidate for enrolment in the imperial college alongside his relations, whom Themistius notes support one another. Themistius points out an imbalance in the college, with two augusti in the western empire and only one augustus – Valens – in the eastern empire, meaning that no emperor was present at Constantinople. Themistius's oration represents the desire of the Byzantine Senate that the imperial presence be rooted at the city by the installation of a new augustus resident there.

== Death ==
Around 370, Valentinianus grew ill in Caesarea in Cappadocia (Kayseri). His death is mentioned in the ecclesiastical histories of Tyrannius Rufinus, Socrates Scholasticus, Sozomen, and Theodoret.

According to Socrates Scholasticus, Dominica told her husband that she had been having visions that their son's illness was a punishment for Valens's ill-treatment of the city's Nicene Christian bishop Basil of Caesarea. Basil was a prominent orthodox leader who opposed the emperor's Arianism. When asked to pray for Valentinianus, Basil is said to have responded by demanding that Valens give a commitment to orthodoxy as the condition for the boy's survival. Valens refused to comply with Basil's demand to baptize his son into Nicene Christianity, instead giving Valentinianus an Arian baptism. Basil responded by saying that God's will would be done, and Valentinianus died soon after in Basil's own episcopal see.

In his Eleventh Oration, delivered after Valentinianus's death, Themistius invokes divine intervention to bring Valens more children.

== Sources ==
- Martindale, J. R.; Jones, A. H. M, The Prosopography of the Later Roman Empire, Vol. I AD 260–395, Cambridge University Press (1971)
- Vanderspoel, John, Themistius and the Imperial Court: Oratory, Civic Duty, and Paideia from Constantius to Theodosius (1995)

Political offices
Preceded by Valentinianus Augustus II; Valens Augustus II	Consul of the Roman Empire; 369 with Victor	Succeeded by Valentinianus Augustus III; Valens Augustus III
