= Lucillianus (fleet commander) =

Roman army officer

- Born: Unknown
- Died: Unknown
- Allegiance: Roman Empire
- Rank: Comes rei militaris
- Commands: Roman fleet on the Euphrates River
- Battles / wars: Julian's Persian expedition (363 AD)

Lucillianus (fl. 358–363 AD) was a Roman military commander during the emperor Julian's disastrous expedition against Sasanian Empire in 363.

Harries identifies Lucillianus as one of the officials whom the emperor Constantius II sent in 358 to the court of his cousin Julian, then ruling as the emperor's deputy (Caesar) in Gaul, to serve as his adviser and keep watch over him. Olszaniec tentatively assigns this role to another Lucillianus instead, but the authors of the PLRE state that the latter was in Persia as an envoy at the time. Lucillianus may have been Julian's quaestor sacri palatii (quaestor of the sacred palace), but Olszaniec rejects this.

When the now-emperor Julian began his invasion of Persia in 363, Lucillianus was given command of the Roman fleet in the Euphrates river, and the rank of comes rei militaris. Lucillianus was present at the meeting between Julian and Saracen leaders on 28 March, and was then sent ahead with a small picked force to capture enemy strongholds. His subsequent fate is unknown, and he may have died in the expedition, or perhaps dismissed by the emperor.
