= Siege of Maiozamalcha =

Roman siege

- Part of the Julian's Persian War
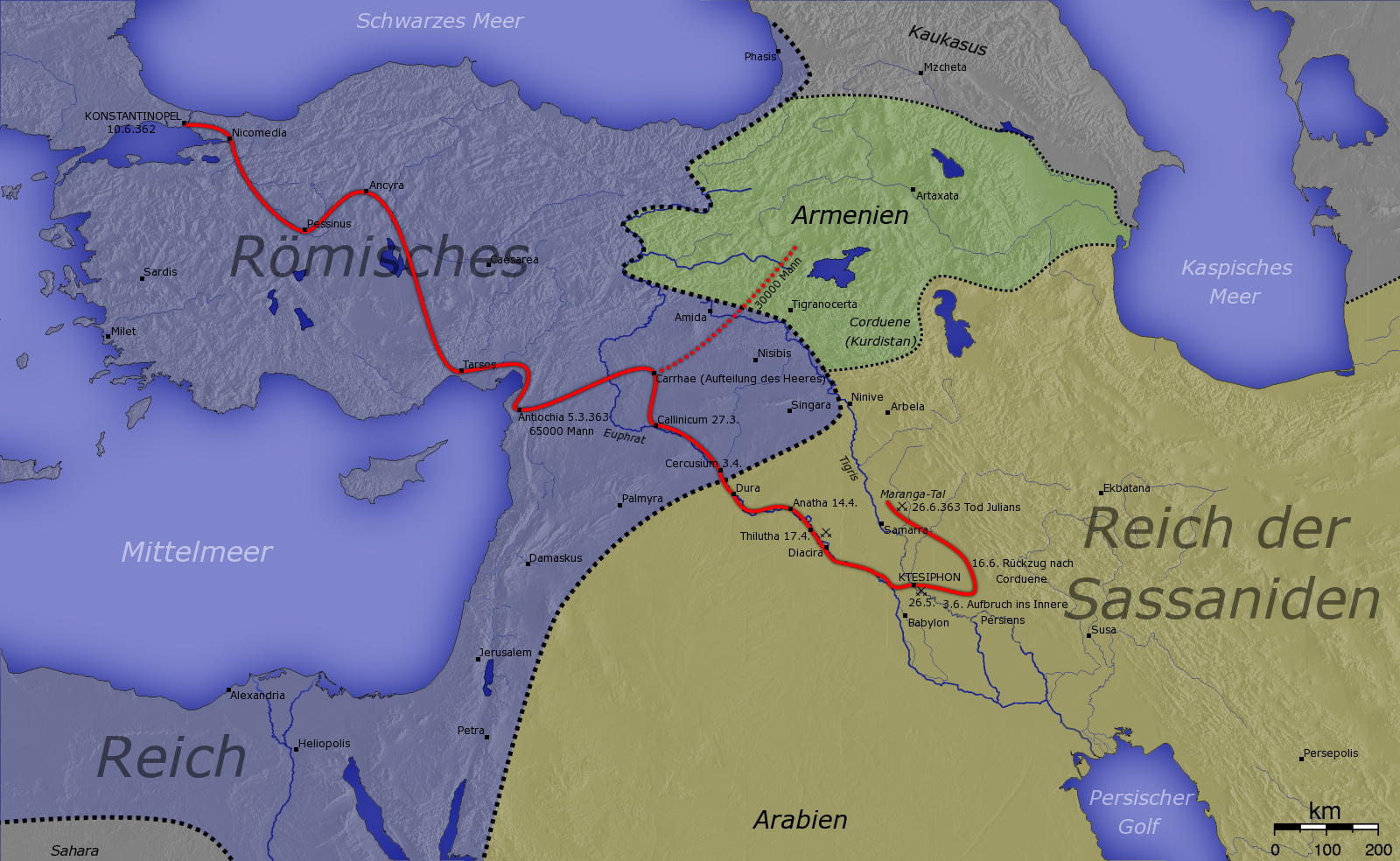
Date	8 May 363
Location	Maiozamalcha, Asoristan, Sasanian Empire
Result	Roman victory

Belligerents
Roman Empire	Sasanian Empire

Commanders and leaders
Julian; Hormizd	Nabdates (POW) †

Casualties and losses
Unknown	Entire city 80 surrendered with Nabdates

During the siege of Maiozamalcha (or Maogamalcha), 8 May 363 CE, the Roman army under Emperor Julian stormed, pillaged, and destroyed the city of Maiozamalcha, before continuing onward to the Sasanian capital of Ctesiphon.

== Background ==
In the year 363 the Roman Emperor Julian, hoping to avenge Roman defeats under his predecessor Constantius II and to establish his fame by accomplishing what had never been done by a Roman before - the subjugation of the east - invaded the dominions of Shapur II, king of Persia.

Assembling his strength at Carrhae in the Roman province of Mesopotamia, Julian divided his forces. While a part of the army (30,000 men, according to Ammianus Marcellinus) was dispatched north-east under his cousin Procopius and Count Sebastian to enlist the aid of Arshak II of Armenia for a march down the Tigris to Ctesiphon; Julian himself, with a larger force (65,000), penetrated Assyria to the south, proceeding along the Euphrates from Callinicum with the same ultimate destination.

Julian crossed the frontier at Circesium, where it had been established by the peace of Diocletian, leaving a detachment of 10,000 to secure his rear. In response to the Roman's invasion, Sasanian cavalry harried his wings, and the dykes and canals were released to flood the country, the land was scorched. However, these obstacles were surmounted. Anah surrendered and was burned, Macepracta was subdued, and after a journey of five days Julian's army came upon the city of Hit. Its soldiers had fled and the city, containing mostly women and children were slaughtered. Pirisabora was reduced, sacked, and its inhabitants massacred. The day following the fall of Pirisabora, a Roman reconnaissance unit was surprised and defeated in an ambush. Julian removed its commanders from their positions of authority. As the Romans approached the Tigris, they discovered a city that had been deserted by its Jewish residents, and the soldiers set it on fire.

Julian promptly arrived under the walls of Maiozamalcha on 8 May, a strongly fortified place 11 miles from the Sasanian capital of Ctesiphon. A cursory reconnaissance of the city walls by Julian was attacked by a small contingent of Sasanians, nearly killing the emperor.

== The siege ==
The first day of the siege, Roman artillery launched volleys of arrows and stones, but without success. The Romans took heavy casualties and the oppressive heat began to take its toll. As evening approached, the exhausted troops pulled back. During the siege, Julian's forces faced a temporary setback when the Sasanians managed to launch a raid from the city walls, targeting the Romans' cattle.

On the second day, the assault on the walls was repelled by a vigorous Sasanian defense, meanwhile a tunnel was surreptitiously dug under the very feet of defenders thanks to Julian's engineers. Not waiting for the next day, Julian ordered his forces into the tunnel. The city was instantly captured from the inside out with no mercy shown towards the astonished defenders or populace.

== Aftermath ==
The Sasanid garrison commander Nabdates and eighty of his men were captured and brought to Julian. He spared their lives. (Note: Barry Baldwin, citing Ammianus, states the Sasanian commander was burned alive.) The fall of Maiozamalcha yielded a wealth of spoils, which was divided among Julian's troops. Afterwards, the city was burned and reduced to ruins.

== Sources ==
- Baldwin, Barry (1984). "Some Addenda to the Prosopography of the Later Roman Empire". Studies on Late Roman and Byzantine History, Literature and Languages. Brill.
- Browning, Robert (1978). The Emperor Julian. University of California Press.
- Dodgeon, Michael H.; Lieu, Samuel N.C., eds. (1991). The Roman Eastern Frontier and the Persian Wars (AD 226-363). Routledge.
- Neusner, Jacob (1969). A History of the Jews in Babylonia, Part 4. The Age of Shapur II. Brill.
- Sarantis, Alexander (2013). "Waging War in Late Antiquity". In Sarantis, Alexander Constantine; Christie, Neil (eds.). War and Warfare in Late Antiquity. Brill. pp. 1–100.
