= Moses (bishop of the Arabs) =

4th century Arab Christian religious leader

Saint Moses of the Saracens

Apostle of the Saracens, Bishop of the Saracens, Venerable
- Born: border region between Egypt and Syria
- Died: c. 389
- Venerated in: Eastern Orthodox Church, Roman Catholic Church
- Feast: 7 February

Moses or Saint Moses spent many years in the 4th century as a hermit on the fringes of the Roman empire between Egypt and Syria, before becoming the first Arab bishop of the Arab people. As he was well respected for his piety, faith, and alleged performance of miracles, Mavia, an Arab warrior-queen, made his consecration as bishop over her people a condition of any truce with Rome.

Moses had no fixed see after his consecration as bishop, journeying instead with his nomadic flock, converting many of them, and keeping peace between the different tribes and the Roman imperial authorities.

== Biography ==
It is not known when he was born, but for some time in the 4th century, Moses, like his ancient namesake, spent many years travelling and preaching in the wilderness in the border region between Egypt and Syria. His life of preaching attracted him a large following among eastern Miaphysites in general and Arabs in particular. This reputation was noted by Socrates of Constantinople, who describes him as "a Saracen by birth, who led a monastic life in the desert", who had become "exceedingly eminent for his piety, faith and miracles." Socrates' description of Moses comes by way of his retelling of the exploits of Queen Mavia, who promised to end her armed revolt against the Roman empire on the condition that Moses be "constituted bishop over her nation."

Valens, the Roman emperor, had no choice but to accept. Mavia's forces, originating in southern Syria, had defeated those of Rome's on multiple occasions, marching through Palestine and Phoenicia, to reaching the frontier with Egypt. Moses also refused to be ordained by the Arian patriarchal see at Alexandria, choosing to be consecrated by chalcedonian bishops living in exile instead. In some accounts, Moses is said to have been nabbed by Roman imperial troops to be taken to be ordained. It is for this reason that he is sometimes confused with Moses the Black, another saint of the region, who is thought to have died some sixty years after he did.

== Notable mentions in history ==
Pope Gregory III (731-741) recalled the example of Moses as a monk turned bishop, in a dialogue with the nephew of St. Boniface, when trying to convince him to join his uncle at the German mission. Irfan Shahid writes: "Thus an Arab monk bishop was presented as a model for the English saint."

== Bibliography ==
- Ball, Warwick (2001), Rome in the East: The Transformation of an Empire, Routledge, ISBN 0-415-11376-8
- Bunson, Matthew; Bunson, Margaret; Bunson, Stephen (2003), Our Sunday Visitor's Encyclopedia of Saints, Our Sunday Visitor Publishing, ISBN 1-931709-75-0
- Butler, Alban; Burns, Paul (2000), Butler's Lives of the Saints, Continuum International Publishing Group, ISBN 0-86012-251-4
- Jensen, Anne (1996), God's Self-confident Daughters: Early Christianity and the Liberation of Women, Westminster John Knox Press, ISBN 0-664-25672-4
- Shahîd, Irfan (1995), Byzantium and the Arabs in the Sixth Century, Dumbarton Oaks, ISBN 0-88402-284-6
