= Bijan (island) =

Island in the middle Euphrates

Bijân Island is an island in the middle Euphrates, in the historical land of Suhum (present-day Iraq). It belongs to a group of islands on which archaeological sites have been recorded.

== Archaeological research ==
Salvage archaeological research on Bijân Island was conducted in the framework of the international Haditha (Qadisiya) Dam Salvage Project. The region was to be flooded as a result of the construction of a dam on the Euphrates; it is now Lake Qadisiya. At the request of the Iraqi Department of Antiquities, several Iraqi and foreign archaeological expeditions worked in the area from 1979 to 1983. One of the first and most active teams was organized by the Polish Centre of Mediterranean Archaeology University of Warsaw (then the Polish Centre of Mediterranean Archaeology of the University of Warsaw in Cairo) under the direction of Michał Gawlikowski and, later, Maria Krogulska. The expedition conducted eight excavation seasons during five years.

== Description of the site ==
The oldest recorded structures, dated to the beginning of the 1st millennium BC, are walls of large limestone blocks, 5–6 m thick. In the Neo-Assyrian period (7th century BC), a mud-brick fortress was built on the island and later expanded. After a 600-year-long hiatus in the settlement, occupation of the site continued in the Parthian, Roman, and early Islamic periods. The most important discoveries include a bronze Parthian censer with a horse-shaped handle, a ceramic bowl with a magical inscription in Aramaic, Roman coins and lamps, and pottery and glass dated to the Abbasid (early Islamic) period.
