= Siege of Pirisabora =

- Part of Julian's Persian War
Date	27–29 April 363
Location	Pirisabora
Result	Roman victory

Belligerents
Roman Empire	Sassanid Empire

Commanders and leaders
Julian; Hormizd	Mamersides (POW)

Strength
65,000	2,500 (including citizens)

The siege of Pirisabora took place when the Roman Emperor Julian besieged the fortified city of Pirisabora under Mamersides in April 363.

After two days of fierce fighting, the Sasanians and the citizens abandoned the circuit walls and took up a defensive position in the acropolis. After some failed attempts, the Romans began to construct a siege tower, after which Mamersides reached a compromise with Julian to hand over the fort in exchange for a safe withdrawal. Julian subsequently pillaged and burned the abandoned city.

== Background ==
After settling political affairs in Constantinople, Emperor Julian gathered an army of 95,000 in Antioch for his invasion of the Sassanid Empire. Upon his arrival at Carrhae, Julian sent his generals, Procopius and Sebastianus, with 30,000 men into Armenia to join up with Arshak II's army of 24,000. At the same time the main body under Julian himself wheeled south, reaching the Euphrates at Callinicum, whence he directed his march south-east along the river towards Ctesiphon, the winter capital of the Sassanids.

== The siege and aftermath ==
Having accepted the submission of Anah and other important cities of Assyria during the course of his march through the province, Julian at length arrived before the walls of Pirisabora, a city 50 miles from Ctesiphon. Garrisoned by a strong detachment of the Persians under Mamersides (per Ammianus), or Momoseiros (per Zosimus), the city maintained a stout defense. However, the walls were soon reduced by the siege engines of the Roman emperor, and the garrison, which retired to an inner citadel while the enemy commenced the sack of the city, was soon after brought to surrender, after a mere two day siege. Pirisabora was burnt and mercilessly ravaged by the soldiery, who well remembered the treatment of the Persians towards Amida, after its capture four years previously (A.D. 359). The spoils of the city were distributed by Julian to the Army. Following this victory, the Roman army marched towards Ctesiphon, sacking and burning Bithra, Diacira and Ozogardana in the process.

Julian later saw the bodies of Mamersides's kinsmen near Seleucia. They were apparently killed by the Sasanians in revenge for Mamersides's surrender.
