= Merena =

Merena was a 4th-century Iranian military officer active during the reign of the Sasanian king (shah) Shapur II (r. 309–379). According to the Iranologist Touraj Daryaee, Merena's real name may have been Mihrān, thus making him a member of the House of Mihran, one of the Seven Great Houses of Iran. He was a cavalry commander in the Sasanian army in the course of the Roman-Persian Wars soon after the Battle of Ctesiphon in 363, which took place outside the Sasanian capital Ctesiphon in the province of Asoristan. As cavalry commander, he also appeared in the Battle of Maranga.

He was among those killed at the subsequent Battle of Samarra, a few hours before the death of the Roman emperor Julian.

== Sources ==
- Ammianus Marcellinus, Res Gestae, Book 25.
- Daryaee, Touraj (2012). "From Terror to Tactical Usage: Elephants in the Partho-Sasanian Period". University of California: 36–41.
- Wiesehöfer, Josef (2001). Ancient Persia. Translated by Azodi, Azizeh. I.B. Tauris. ISBN 978-1-86064-675-1.
