= Pigranes =

Pigranes was a 4th-century Sasanian military officer active during the reign of Shapur II (r. 309–379). According to Ammianus Marcellinus, on 29 May 363, when the forces of the Roman Emperor Julian (r. 361–363) besieged the Sasanian capital of Ctesiphon, Pigranes along with his fellow officers Narseus and Surena were defeated and forced to flee to the interior of the city walls.

== Sources ==
- Martindale, John R.; Jones, A. H. M.; Morris, John, eds. (1971). The Prosopography of the Later Roman Empire: Volume I, AD 260–395. Cambridge: Cambridge University Press. ISBN 0-521-07233-6.
