= Battle of Samarra (363) =

Battle between Roman and Sasanian Empires

- Part of Julian's Persian expedition
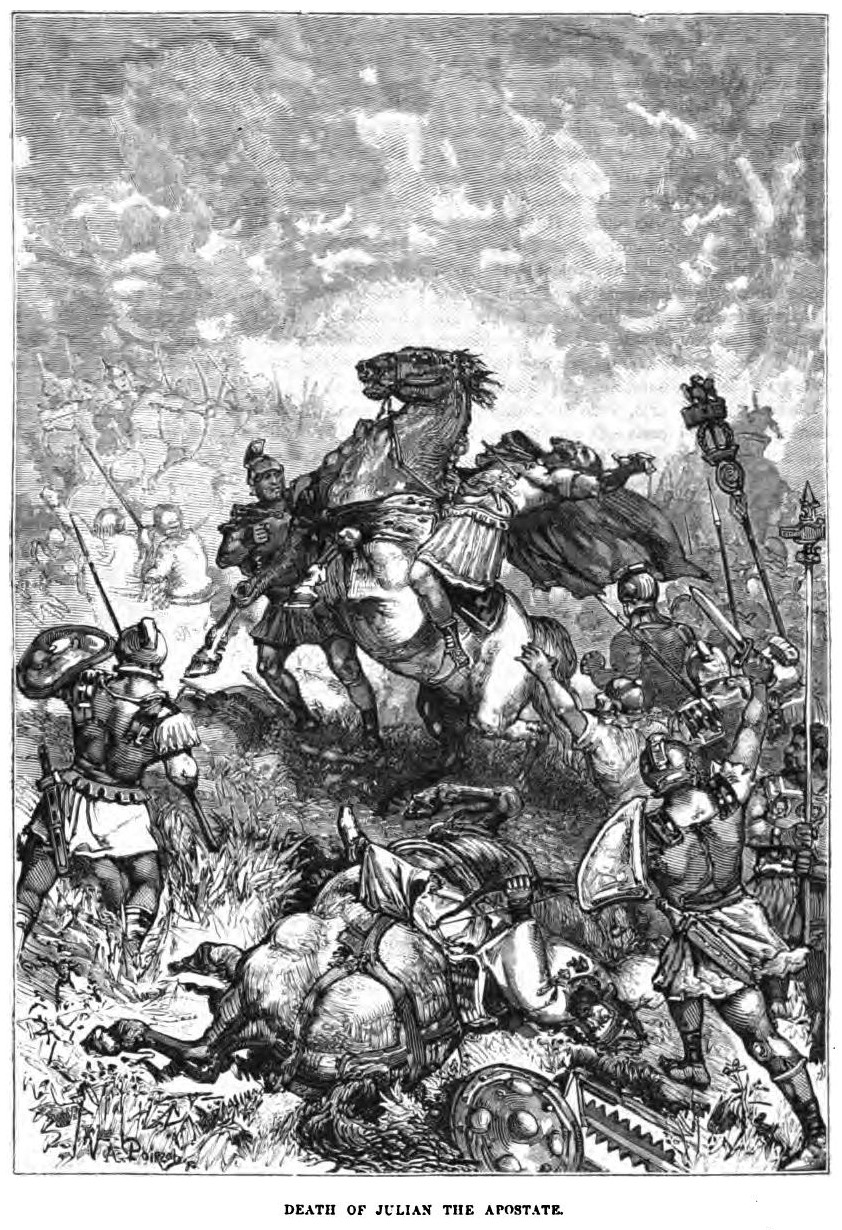
- Death of the Julian the Apostate in the battle of Samarra (Cassell's Illustrated Universal History, vol. 3, 1882)
Date	June 363 AD
Location	Samarra, Mesopotamia
Result	Sasanian victory

Belligerents
Sasanian Empire	Roman Empire

Commanders and leaders
Shapur II; Merena †; Nohodares (executed)	Emperor Julian †; Anatolius †

The Battle of Samarra took place in June 363, during the invasion of the Sasanian Empire by the Roman emperor Julian. After marching his army to the gates of Ctesiphon and failing to take the city, Julian, realizing his army was low on provisions and in enemy territory, started marching towards Samarra.

The battle began as a Sasanian attack on the Roman rearguard, but developed into a major battle. Julian was wounded during the battle, and later died without choosing a successor. Following Julian's death, the Romans elected Jovian as emperor. Stranded deep in Sasanian territory and suffering from a lack of supplies, Jovian was forced to accept terms for peace.

== Julian's campaign ==
Julian invaded the Sasanian Empire with a force of 95,000 men, hoping to secure the eastern frontier and to replace Shah Shapur II with his brother Hormisdas. He split his force in two, one under his cousin Procopius numbering 30,000 men, which marched to northern Mesopotamia, and the other consisting of 65,000 men under his own leadership. Julian at first won a tactical victory outside Ctesiphon, but his army was too distracted with pillaging to take the city. Julian burned the fleet which he had brought down the river to Ctesiphon, and much of the baggage, leaving a bare three weeks supply. He then directed his march inland into the heart of Shapur's dominions, hoping to force a battle.

== Battle ==
A map of the campaign up to the battle of Samarra

By June 363, Julian, realizing that he was trapped in Sasanian territory, started marching his army towards Samarra. The Roman army was under constant attack and Julian was informed the Sasanians were harassing the rear guard. Julian rode back, not waiting to don his breastplate, and when he arrived at the rear guard was told the left flank was under cavalry attack reinforced by elephants.

Riding towards the left flank, Julian rallied retreating Roman troops. The Sasanians seeing the Romans reforming started to retreat. Emboldened by this, Julian called for his troops to follow after him, and he charged toward the fleeing Sasanians. By this time his bodyguards, who were separated from Julian, called for him to pull back. At this point, Julian was struck in the side by a spear and fell from his horse. His bodyguards surrounded him, carried him back, and the army quickly pitched camp. (Note: Julian was killed by a spear probably thrown by a Saracen (Lakhmid) auxiliary in Sasanian service, as his doctor Oribasius concluded.) Julian died from his wound at midnight.

According to Dignas and Winter, the Romans won this battle, while Touraj Daryaee states the Sasanian forces won the battle.

== Aftermath ==
Julian had refrained from naming a successor, and the commanders assembled at dawn for the election. The honor was extended to the prefect Salutius, but he refused. Their choice then spontaneously settled on Jovian, the commander of Julian's domestic guard, whose father had been a general in the same service. He resumed the retreat along the east bank of the Tigris, continuously harassed from the Sasanians. After four further days of struggling on, the demoralized army finally came to a halt at Dura, where they attempted to construct a bridge to cross the river, but failed to do so, and were surrounded on all sides by the Sasanian army. Jovian clearly saw that the situation was now desperate. Unexpectedly, the envoys of Shapur II arrived in his camp bearing offers of peace, and Jovian, who during the halt had exhausted his provisions, grasped eagerly at any venue of extricating the army from its dire situation. Thus he was forced to accept humiliating terms from Shapur, in order to save his army and himself from complete destruction. According to the treaty with Shapur, Jovian agreed to a thirty-year truce, a withdrawal from the five Roman provinces, Arzamena, Moxoeona, Azbdicena, Rehimena and Corduena, and to allow the Sasanians to occupy the fortresses of Nisibis, Castra Maurorum and Singara.

== Sources ==
- Browning, Robert (1976). The Emperor Julian. University of California Press. ISBN 0-520-03731-6.
- Curran, John (1998). "From Jovian to Theodosius". In Cameron, Averil; Garnsey, Peter (eds.). The Cambridge Ancient History: The Late Empire, A.D. 337-425. Vol. XIII (2nd ed.). Cambridge University Press. pp. 78–110. ISBN 978-0521302005.
- Daryaee, Touraj (2009). "ŠĀPUR II". Encyclopaedia Iranica.
- Dignas, Beate; Winter, Engelbert (2007). Rome and Persia in Late Antiquity: Neighbours and Rivals. Cambridge University Press.
- Lenski, Noel (2002). Failure of Empire: Valens and the Roman State in the Fourth Century A.D. University of California Press.69-70
- Potter, David S. (2004). The Roman Empire at Bay AD 180-395. Routledge.
- Sarantis, Alexander (2013). War and Warfare in Late Antiquity (2 vols.): Current Perspectives. BRILL. ISBN 9789004252585.
- Tougher, Shaun (2007). Julian the Apostate. Edinburgh University Press.
