= 4th century in Roman Britain =

Events from the 4th century in Roman Britain.

== Events ==
- 301
  - Emperor Diocletian fixes the prices of British woollen goods and beer.
- 306
  - 25 July – Emperor Constantius Chlorus dies at Eboracum (York), after campaigning against the Picts. His son Constantine the Great is acclaimed as his successor by the troops here.
- 314
  - The reforms of Diocletian take effect, dividing Britain into four provinces and separating military and civilian government.
  - Establishment of initial Christian hierarchy in Britain.
  - Three British bishops attend the Council of Arles.
- 343
  - January – Emperor Constans visits Britain, and strengthens northern frontier and Saxon Shore.
  - Construction of Pevensey Fort.
- 353
  - Roman Emperor Constantius II punishes British supporters of the recently defeated usurper, Magnentius, and suppresses paganism.
- 355
  - Julian the Apostate placed in charge of Britain and Gaul.
- 359
  - Julian makes Britain main granary for western Roman army.
- 360
  - Picts and Irish attack northern frontier.
- 367
  - The Great Conspiracy: Sustained raids by Picts, Irish, and Saxons. Hadrian's Wall abandoned and military commander Fullofaudes captured or killed.
- 368
  - Count Theodosius arrives in Britain with a military task-force, restores administration under Governor Civilis and commander Dulcitius.
- 369
  - Theodosius defeats invaders, builds new watchtowers from Filey to Huntcliff, re-fortifies northern frontier.
- 382
  - Magnus Maximus defeats the Picts and Scots.
- 383
  - Maximus usurps control of the Empire, taking troops from Britain and abandoning the forts at Chester and the Pennines.
- 397
  - Saint Ninian converts the region around Galloway to Christianity.

== See also ==
- End of Roman rule in Britain
- Sub-Roman Britain
- 5th century in England
