= Valentinian I =

Roman emperor from 364 to 375

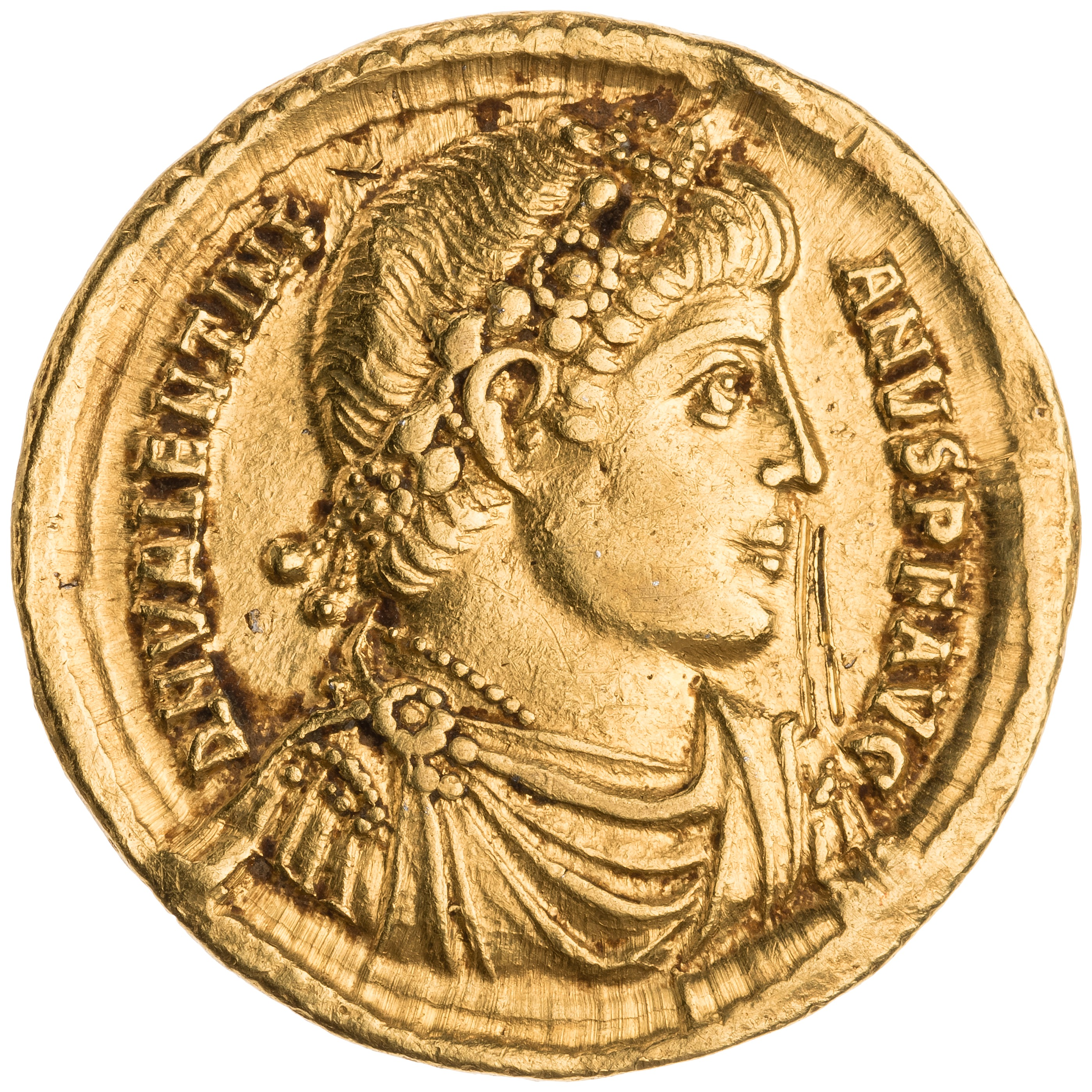
- Solidus of Valentinian marked: d·n· valentinianus p·f· aug·

Roman emperor
- Reign: 26 February 364 – 17 November 375
- Predecessor: Jovian
- Successor: Gratian and Valentinian II
- Co-emperor: Valens (in the East)
- Rival: Procopius
- Born: 321; Cibalae, Pannonia, Roman Empire (now Vinkovci, Croatia)
- Died: 17 November 375 (aged 54); Brigetio, Pannonia Valeria (now Szőny, Hungary)
- Spouse: Marina Severa; Justina
- Issue: Gratian; Valentinian II; Galla; Grata; Justa
Regnal name
- Imperator Caesar Flavius Valentinianus Augustus (Note: The name "Flavius" only appears in two single inscriptions, and only abbreviated as "Fl". By the late 4th century, "Flavius" had become a courtesy title used not only for emperors, but to all high-profile men, like the Roman consuls.) (Note: The L'Année Épigraphique attests his full name as Flavius Julius Valentinianus.)
- Dynasty: Valentinianic
- Father: Gratianus Funarius
- Religion: Nicene Christianity

Valentinian I (Latin: Valentinianus; 321 – 17 November 375), sometimes known as Valentinian the Great, was Roman emperor from 364 to 375. He is the second-last emperor to govern the empire as a whole, albeit only from February to March of 364, after which he appointed Valens to rule over the Eastern half of the empire, while he remained in control of the West. The founder of the Valentinian dynasty, he is noted for his successful campaigns on the Rhine and Danube frontiers.

Born into a military family in Pannonia, Valentinian rose through the ranks under emperors Constantius II, Julian and Jovian. Following Jovian's early death, Valentinian was proclaimed emperor, and he subsequently selected his brother Valens as co-emperor. During his reign, he fought successfully against the Alamanni, Quadi, and Sarmatians, strengthening the border fortifications and conducting campaigns across the frontiers. In addition, he dispatched his general Theodosius the Elder to suppress a revolt in Africa and the Great Conspiracy, a coordinated assault on Roman Britain by Picts, Scoti, and Saxons. Valentinian suffered a fatal stroke at a meeting with Quadi envoys in Pannonia, with his sons Gratian and Valentinian II succeeding him in the western half of the empire.

== Early life ==
Valentinian was born in 321 at Cibalae (now Vinkovci, Croatia) in southern Pannonia into a family of Illyro-Roman origin. Valentinian and his younger brother Valens were the sons of Gratianus (nicknamed Funarius), a military officer renowned for his wrestling skills.

Gratianus was promoted to comes Africae in the late 320s or early 330s, and the young Valentinian accompanied his father to Africa. However, Gratianus was soon accused of embezzlement and retired. Valentinian joined the army in the late 330s and later probably acquired the position of protector domesticus. Gratianus was later recalled during the early 340s and was made comes Britanniarum. After holding this post, he retired to the family estate in Cibalae.

In 350, Constans I was assassinated by agents of the usurper Magnentius, a commander who proclaimed himself emperor in Gaul. Constantius II, older brother of Constans and emperor in the East, promptly set forth towards Magnentius with a large army. The following year the two emperors met in Pannonia and fought the Battle of Mursa Major, which ended in a costly victory for Constantius. Two years later Magnentius killed himself after another defeat at the Battle of Mons Seleucus, leaving Constantius sole ruler of the empire. It was around this time that Constantius confiscated Gratianus' property, for supposedly showing hospitality to Magnentius when he was in Pannonia. Despite his father's fall from favour, Valentinian does not seem to have been adversely affected at this time, making it unlikely he ever fought for the usurper. It is known that Valentinian was in the region during the conflict, but what involvement he had in the war, if any, is unknown.

== Service under Constantius and Julian ==
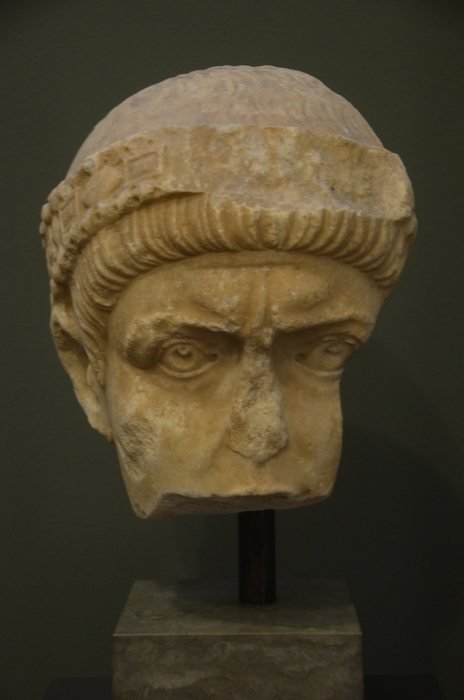
Damaged head of a Valentinianic emperor. It most likely depicts Valentinian I, or perhaps his brother, Valens. In Ny Carlsberg Glyptotek.

During the conflict between Magnentius and Constantius, the Alamanni and Franks took advantage of the confusion and crossed the Rhine, attacking several important settlements and fortifications. In 355, after deposing his cousin Gallus but still feeling the crises of the empire too much for one emperor to handle, Constantius raised his cousin Julian to the rank of Caesar. With the situation in Gaul rapidly deteriorating, Julian was made at least nominal commander of one of the two main armies in Gaul, Barbatio being commander of the other. Constantius devised a strategy where Julian and Barbatio would operate in a pincer movement against the Alamanni. However, a band of Alamanni slipped past Julian and Barbatio and attacked Lugdunum (Lyon). Julian sent the tribunes Valentinian and Bainobaudes to watch the road the raiders would have to return by. However, their efforts were hindered by Barbatio and his tribune Cella. The Alamanni king Chnodomarius took advantage of the situation and attacked the Romans, inflicting heavy losses. Barbatio complained to Constantius and the debacle was blamed on Valentinian and Bainobaudes, who were cashiered from the army.

With his career in ruins, Valentinian returned to his new family estate in Sirmium (in modern day Serbia). Two years later his first wife Marina Severa had given birth to a son, Gratian. During the (sole) reign of the polytheist Julian, Valentinian's actions and location become uncertain, but he was likely exiled, (Note: Sources give different commands Valentinian held at the time and vastly different places of exile: Philostorgius says Constantius exiled Valentinian to Thebes in Egypt, Sozomen to Melitene in Armenia, the Paschal Chronicle to Selymbria in Thrace, and Theodoret to "a distant fort.”) or perhaps simply sent to command a remote outpost. The sources give contradictory accounts of what happened, with some versions saying that he refused to make pagan sacrifices and voluntarily chose to leave, and others saying he was merely dismissed for his Christianity.

== Rise to power ==
At the news of Julian's death on a campaign against the Sasanian Empire, the army hastily declared Jovian the new emperor. Jovian extricated his soldiers from Persian territory by agreeing to a humiliating peace treaty, then started back to Constantinople. During Jovian's brief reign Valentinian was promoted to tribune of a Scutarii (elite infantry) regiment, which Hughes considered to reflect the new emperor’s trust in him, and dispatched to Ancyra (modern day Ankara).

Jovian died in mysterious circumstances before he reached the capital, and a meeting of civil and military officials was convened at Nicaea to choose a new emperor. Salutius, who had already refused the throne after Julian's death, now did so again, first for himself and then on behalf of his son. Two other names were proposed: Aequitius, a tribune of the first Scutarii, and Januarius, a relative of Jovian's in charge of military supplies in Illyricum. Both were rejected; Aequitius as too rough and boorish, Januarius because he was too far away. The assembly finally agreed upon Valentinian, as a man both well qualified and nearby, and sent messengers to inform him in Ancyra.

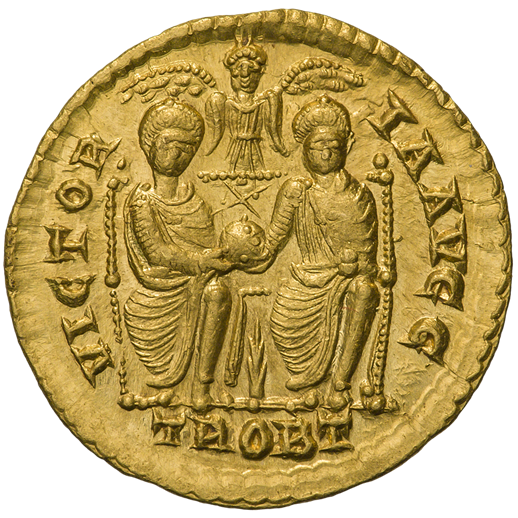
Valentinian and Valens enthroned on the reverse of a solidus of Valens, marked victoria augg· ("the Victory of Our Augusti"). They hold together the orb, a symbol of power

== Reign ==
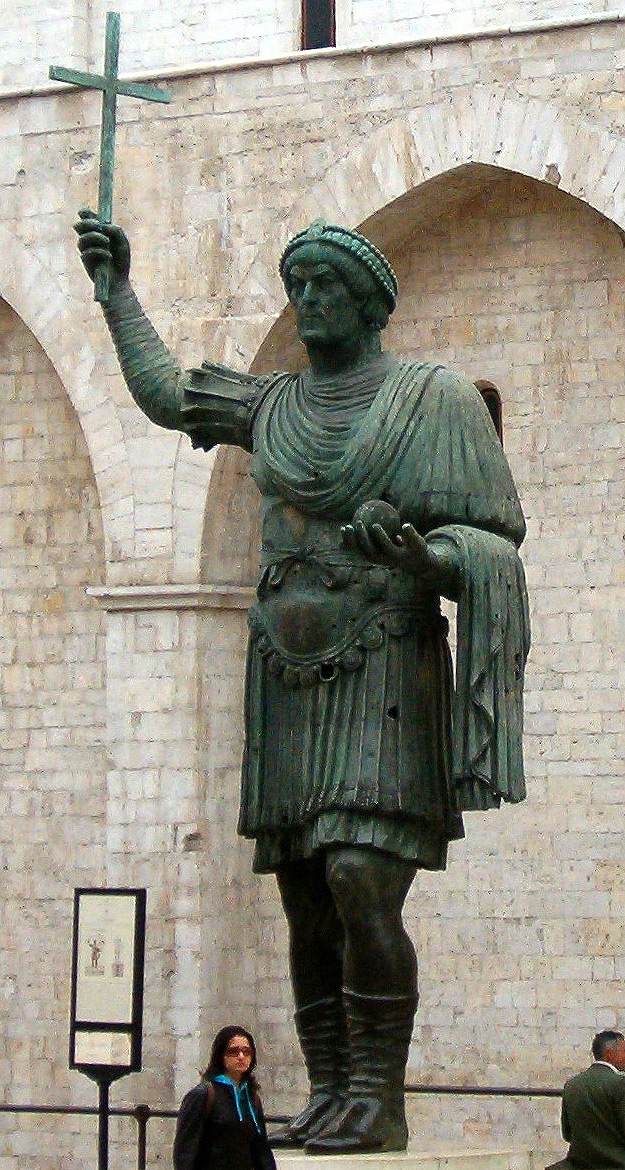
The Colossus of Barletta: Statue of a Roman emperor sometimes identified as Valentinian I. It probably depicts Leo I instead.

Valentinian accepted the acclamation on 25 or 26 February 364. As he prepared to make his accession speech, the soldiers threatened to riot, apparently uncertain of his loyalties. Valentinian reassured them that the army was his greatest priority. According to Ammianus the soldiers were astounded by Valentinian's bold demeanour and his willingness to assume the imperial authority. To further prevent a succession crisis he agreed to pick a co-Augustus, perhaps as a reassurance to civilian officials in the Eastern part of the Empire that someone with imperial authority would be present to protect their interests.

Valentinian selected his brother Valens as co-Augustus at Constantinople on 28 March 364. This was done over the objections of Dagalaifus, the magister equitum. Ammianus makes it clear that Valens was subordinate to his brother. The remainder of 364 was spent delegating administrative duties and military commands. According to the 5th century pagan historian Zosimus, who was inclined to revile the restorer of Christianity, all the ministers and officials appointed by Julian were summarily dismissed in disgrace. This assertion was qualified by modern authorities. It is certain that some reshuffling of commands occurred along with the division of the provinces, but the changes were strictly based on merit. Valentinian retained the services of Dagalaifus and promoted Aequitius to Comes Illyricum. Valens was given the Praetorian prefecture of the East, governed by prefect Salutius. Valentinian gained control of Italy, Gaul, and Illyricum. Valens resided in Constantinople, while Valentinian's court was situated in Milan (Mediolanum).

=== Campaigns in Gaul and Germania ===
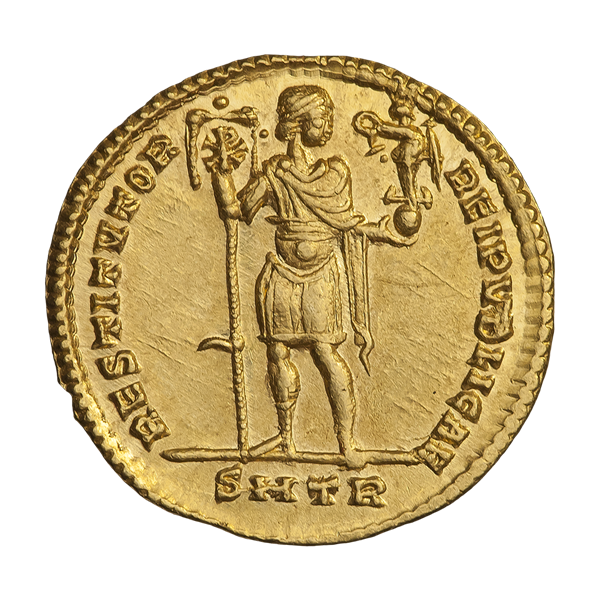
Reverse of a solidus of Valentinian marked: restitutor reipublicae ("restitutor of the Republic")

In 365 the Alemanni crossed the Rhine and invaded Gaul. Simultaneously, Procopius began his revolt against Valens in the east. According to Ammianus, Valentinian received news of both crises on 1 November while on his way to Lutetia. He initially sent Dagalaifus to fight the Alemanni while he himself made preparations to march east and help Valens. After receiving counsel from his court and deputations from the leading Gallic cities begging him to stay and protect Gaul, he decided to remain and fight the Alemanni. Valentinian advanced to Durocortorum and sent two generals, Charietto and Severianus, against the invaders. Both generals were promptly defeated and killed; Dagalaifus took their place in 366, but he was also ineffective. Late in the campaigning season Dagalaifus was replaced by Jovinus, a general from the court of Valentinian. After several victories along the Meuse river, Jovinus fought and won a pitched battle with the Alemanni near Chalôn. After his victory he pushed the Alemanni out of Gaul and was awarded the consulate the following year for his efforts.

In early 367, crises in Britain and northern Gaul postponed Valentinian's punitive expedition against the Alemanni, who promptly re-crossed the Rhine and plundered Mogontiacum. Valentinian succeeded in arranging the assassination of Vithicabius, an Alemannic leader, but wanted to decisively end the conflict by bringing the Alemanni under Roman hegemony. Valentinian spent the entire winter of 367 gathering a massive army for a spring offensive. He summoned the Comes Italiae Sebastianus, with the Italian and Illyrian legions, to join Jovinus and Severus, the magister peditum. In the spring of 368 Valentinian, his eight-year-old son Gratian and the army crossed the Rhine and Main rivers into Alemannic territory. Initially they encountered no resistance, burning any dwellings or food stores they found along the way. Finally, Valentinian fought the Alemanni in the Battle of Solicinium; the Romans were victorious but suffered heavy casualties. A temporary peace was reached and Valentinian returned to Trier for the winter. During 369, Valentinian ordered new defensive works to be constructed and old structures refurbished along the length of the Rhine's west bank. Boldly, he ordered the construction of a fortress across the Rhine in the mountains near modern Heidelberg. The Alemanni sent envoys to protest, but they were dismissed. The Alemanni attacked the fortress while it was still under construction and destroyed it.

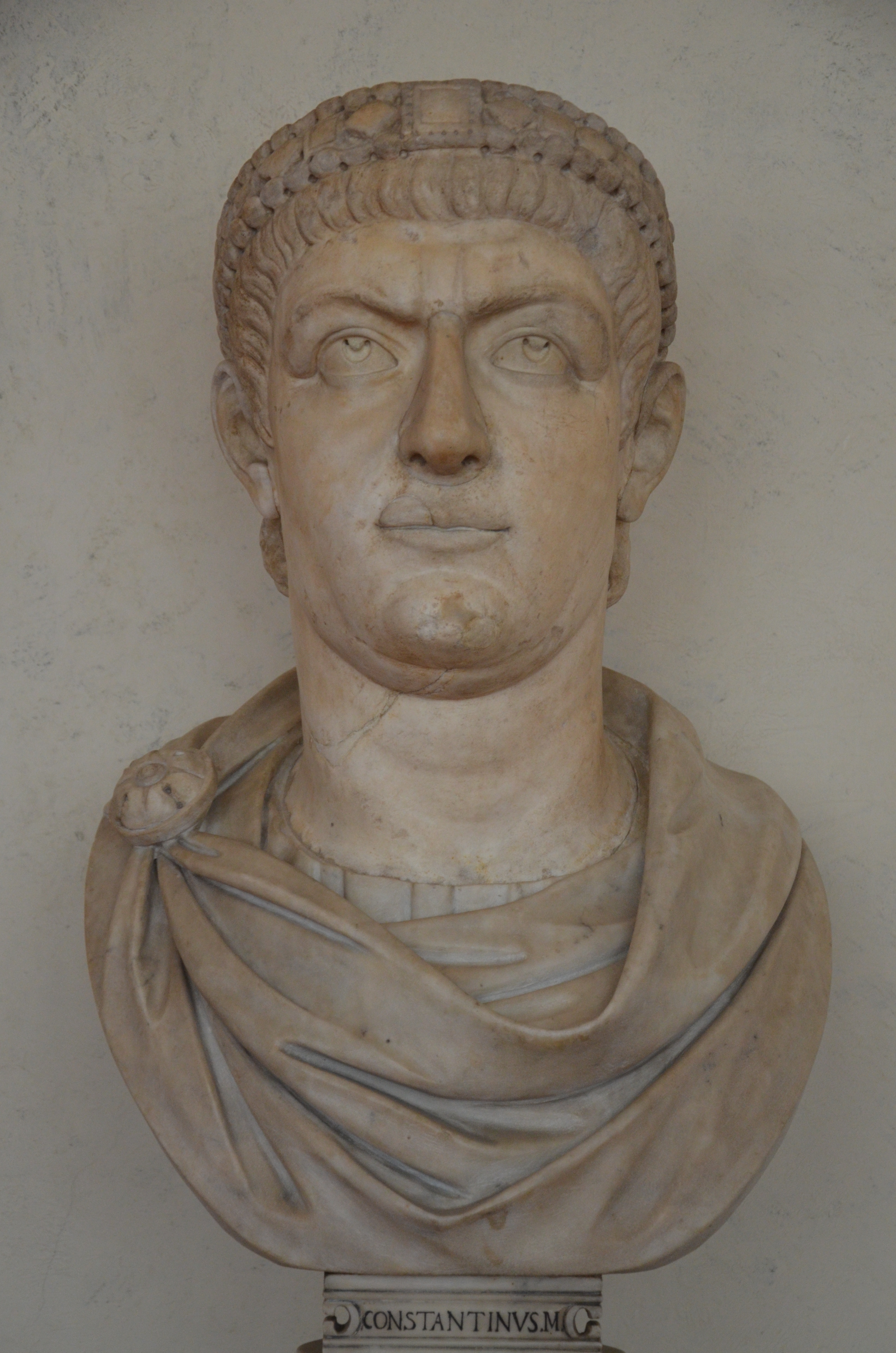
Life-size portrait head of Valentinian or Valens on a modern bust, Uffizi Gallery.

In 370 the Saxons renewed their attacks on northern Gaul. Nannienus, the comes in charge of the troops in northern Gaul, urged Severus to come to his aid. After several modest successes, a truce was called and the Saxons handed over young men fit for duty in the Roman military, in exchange for free passage back to their homeland. The Romans ambushed them and destroyed the entire invading force.

Valentinian meanwhile tried to persuade the Burgundians – bitter enemies of the Alemanni – to attack Macrian, a powerful Alemannic chieftain. If the Alamanni tried to flee, Valentinian would be waiting for them with his army. Negotiations with the Burgundians broke down when Valentinian, in his usual high-handed manner, refused to meet with the Burgundian envoys and personally assure them of Roman support. Nevertheless, rumors of a Roman alliance with the Burgundians did have the effect of scattering the Alemanni through fear of an imminent attack from their enemies. This event allowed the magister equitum Theodosius to attack the Alemanni through Raetia. The many prisoners he took were settled in the Po river valley in Italy, where they still resided at the time Ammianus wrote his history.

Valentinian campaigned unsuccessfully for four more years to defeat Macrian, who in 372 barely escaped capture by Theodosius. Meanwhile, Valentinian continued to recruit heavily from Alemanni friendly to Rome. The Alemannic king Fraomar was given the rank of tribune and sent to Britain in 372–373 with an army of reinforcements, and the noblemen Bitheridius and Hortarius became commanders in Valentinian's army, although Hortarius was soon executed for conspiring with Macrian. The campaigns against hostile Alemanni were hampered by troubles first in Africa, and later on the Danube river. In 374 Valentinian was forced to make peace with Macrian because the Emperor's presence was needed to counter an invasion of Illyricum by the Quadi and Sarmatians.

=== The Great Conspiracy ===
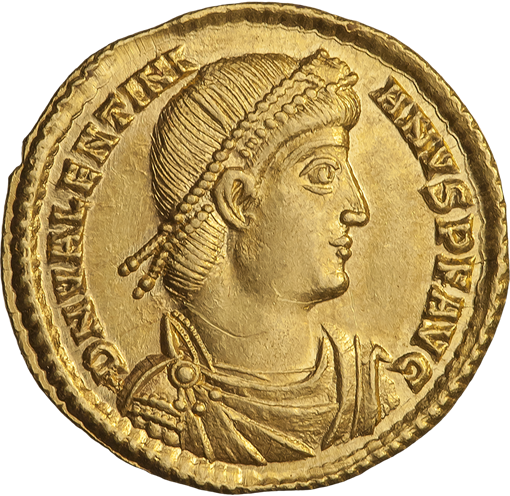
A solidus of Valentinian

In 367, events known as the Great Conspiracy threatened Roman control of Britain. Valentinian received reports that a combined force of Picts, Attacotti and Scots had attacked the province, killing the Comes litoris Saxonici Nectaridus and Dux Britanniarum Fullofaudes. At the same time, Frankish and Saxon forces were raiding the coastal areas of northern Gaul. Valentinian set out for Britain, sending Comes domesticorum Severus ahead of him to investigate. Severus was not able to correct the situation and returned to Gaul, meeting Valentinian at Samarobriva. Valentinian then sent Jovinus to Britain and promoted Severus to magister peditum. It was at this time that Valentinian fell ill and a battle for succession broke out between Severus, a representative of the army, and Rusticus Julianus, magister memoriae and a representative of the Gallic nobility. The conflict dissipated when Valentinian recovered and appointed his son Gratian as his co-Augustus in the west. Ammianus remarks that such an action was unprecedented. Jovinus quickly returned saying that he needed more men to take care of the situation. In 368 Valentinian appointed Theodosius as the new Comes Britanniarum with instructions to return Britain to Roman rule. Meanwhile, Severus and Jovinus were to accompany the emperor on his campaign against the Alamanni.

Theodosius arrived in 368 with the Batavi, Heruli, Jovii and Victores legions. Landing at Rutupiæ, he proceeded to Londinium, restoring order to southern Britain. Later, he rallied the remaining garrison which was originally stationed in Britain; it was apparent the units had lost their cohesiveness when Fullofaudes and Nectaridus had been defeated. Theodosius sent for Civilis to be installed as the new vicarius of the diocese and Dulcitius as an additional general. In 369, Theodosius set about reconquering the areas north of Londinium, putting down the revolt of Valentinus, the brother-in-law of a vicarius, Maximinus. Subsequently, Theodosius restored the rest of Britain to the empire and rebuilt many fortifications – renaming northern Britain 'Valentia'. After his return in 369, Valentinian promoted Theodosius to magister equitum in place of Jovinus.

=== Revolt in Africa and crises on the Danube ===
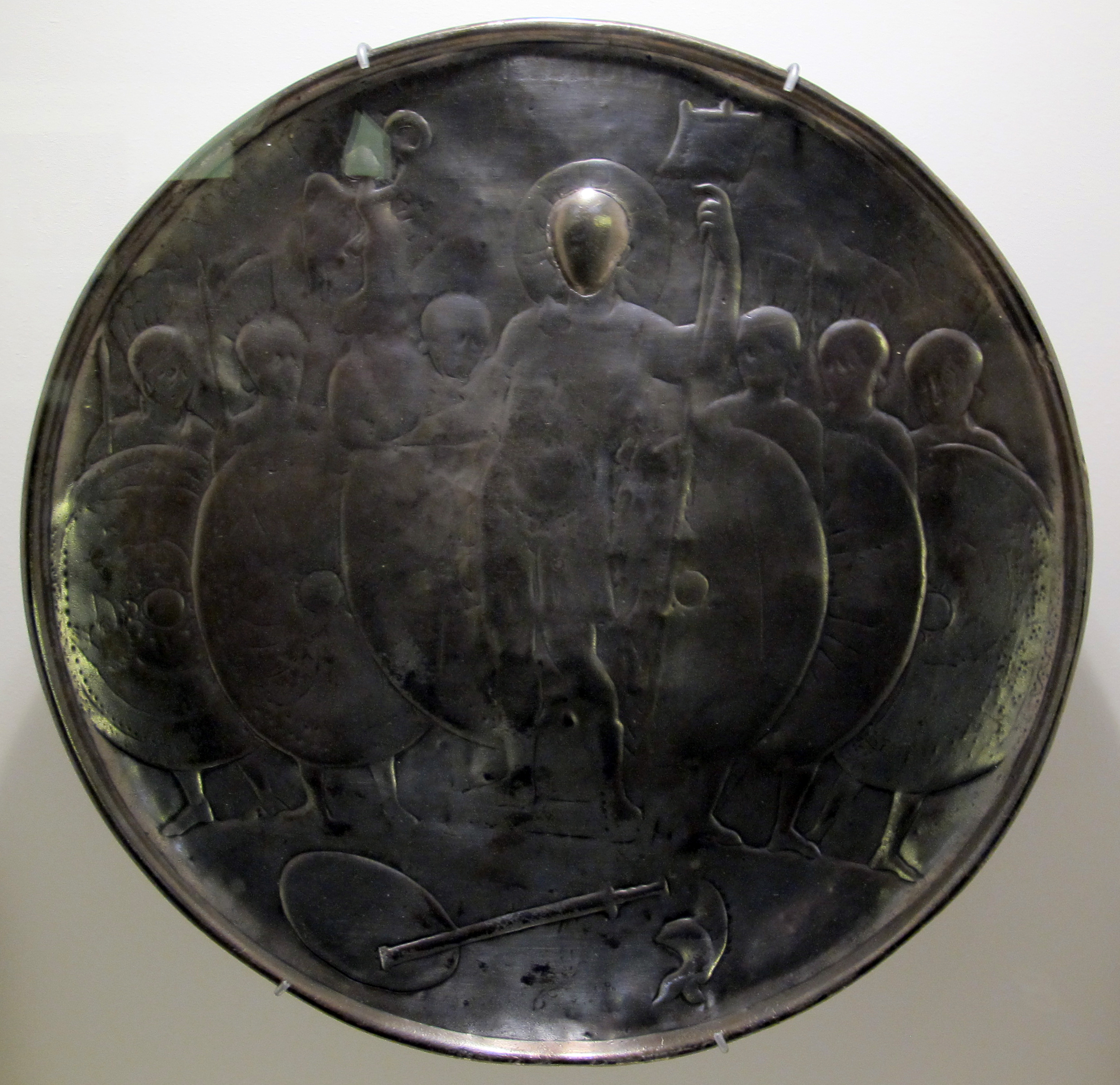
Heavily-worn silver missorium (ca. 364–375) believed to depict Valentinian I. Flanked by infantry soldiers, the armoured and haloed emperor holds a labarum in one hand and an orb surmounted by a figure of Victory in the other

In 372, the rebellion of Firmus broke out in the still-devastated African provinces. This rebellion was driven by the corruption of the comes Romanus. Romanus took sides in the murderous disputes among the legitimate and illegitimate children of Nubel, a Moorish prince and leading Roman client in Africa. Resentment of Romanus's personal use of public funds and his failure to defend the province from desert nomads caused some of the provincials to revolt. Valentinian sent in Theodosius to restore imperial control. Over the following two years Theodosius uncovered Romanus' crimes, arrested him and his supporters, and defeated both Firmus and the African tribes like the Abanni and Caprarienses that supported him.

In 373, hostilities erupted with the Quadi, a group of Germanic-speaking people living on the upper Danube. Like the Alamanni, the Quadi were outraged that Valentinian was building fortifications in their territory. They complained and sent deputations to the magister armorum per Illyricum Aequitius, who promised to refer the matter to Valentinian. However, the increasingly influential minister Maximinus, now praetorian prefect of Gaul, blamed Aequitius to Valentinian for the trouble, and managed to have him promote his son Marcellianus to finish the project. The protests of Quadic leaders continued to delay construction, and to put an end to their clamor Marcellianus murdered the Quadic king Gabinius at a banquet ostensibly arranged for peaceful negotiations. This roused the Quadi to war, along with their allies the Sarmatians. During the fall, they crossed the Danube and began ravaging the province of Pannonia Valeria. The marauders could not penetrate the fortified cities, but they heavily damaged the unprotected countryside. Two legions were sent in but failed to coordinate and were routed by the Sarmatians. Meanwhile, another group of Sarmatians invaded Moesia, but were driven back by the son of Theodosius, Dux Moesiae and later emperor Theodosius.

Valentinian did not receive news of these crises until late 374. The following spring he set out from Trier and arrived at Carnuntum, which was deserted. There he was met by Sarmatian envoys who begged forgiveness for their actions. Valentinian replied that he would investigate what had happened and act accordingly. Valentinian ignored Marcellianus' treacherous actions and decided to punish the Quadi. He was accompanied by Sebastianus and Merobaudes, and spent the summer months preparing for the campaign. In the fall he crossed the Danube at Aquincum into Quadi territory. After pillaging Quadi lands without opposition, he retired to Savaria to winter quarters.

== Death ==
Without waiting for the spring, Valentinian decided to continue campaigning and moved from Savaria to Brigetio. He arrived on 17 November 375 and had a hostile meeting with a Quadi deputation, who received permission for their people to leave in peace in return for supplying fresh recruits to the Roman army. The envoys insisted that the conflict was caused by the building of Roman forts in their lands. They added that individual bands of Quadi, not affiliated with the chiefs who had made the treaties, might still attack the Romans at any time. Enraged, Valentinian began yelling abuse at the envoys and suffered a fatal stroke. As was the custom, he was deified, becoming known as Latin: Divus Valentinianus Senior, lit. 'the Divine Valentinian the Elder'.

== Reputation ==
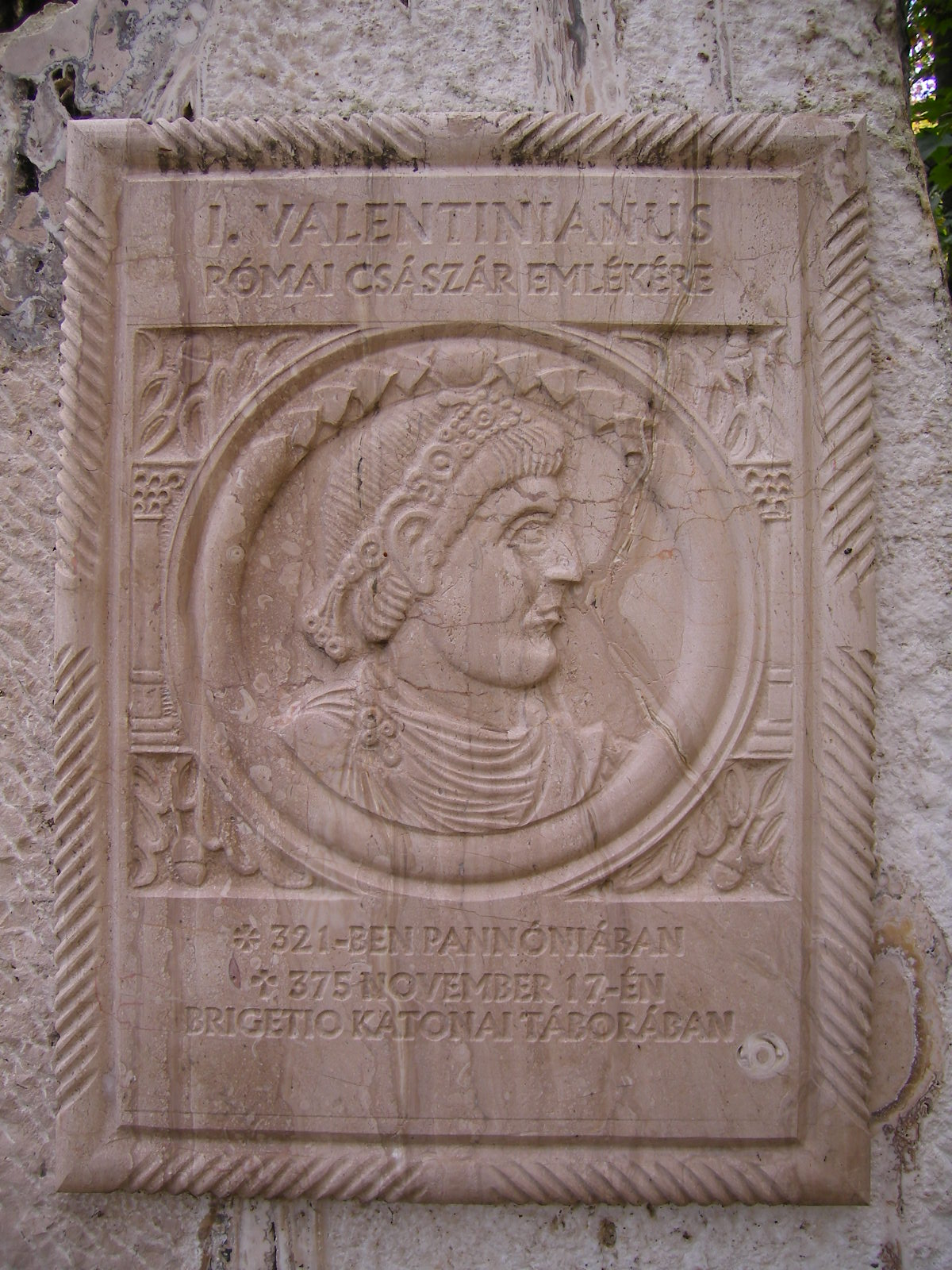
Modern memorial to Valentinian at Szőny (Latin: Brigetio) in Hungary

Modern historian A.H.M. Jones writes that although Valentinian I was "less of a boor" than his chief rival for election to the imperial throne, "he was of a violent and brutal temper, and not only uncultivated himself, but hostile to cultivated persons". According to Ammianus, "he hated the well-dressed and educated and wealthy and well-born", which suggests Valentinian had his enemies in Rome who wanted to defame him by describing him as an uneducated brute. This was not a complete picture: Ammianus concedes that Valentinian had some spontaneous oratorical skill, and also says that in his spare time the Emperor was "an elegant painter and modeller [i.e., sculptor], and an inventor of new kinds of [weapons]" (XXX.9.4). He appointed the Latin scholar Ausonius as tutor for his son Gratian, showing an appreciation for the kind of classical education which he himself had been denied. According to Hugh Chisholm (1911), he was an able soldier and a conscientious administrator who took an interest in the welfare of the humbler classes from which his father had risen. He founded schools, and provided medical attendance for the poor of Rome by appointing a physician for each of the fourteen districts of the city. He also reissued an edict of Constantine I condemning abandonment of infants.

Unfortunately Valentinian's good intentions were often frustrated by a bad choice of ministers, and "an obstinate belief in their merits despite all evidence to the contrary." Further, the benevolence of his more generous edicts was counterbalanced by remarkable cruelty and barbarism in his private affairs. He often had servants and attendants executed on trifling charges, and was reportedly accustomed to feed his victims to two bears, known as Mica Aurea (golden flake), and Innocence, whose iron cage was transported wherever the emperor went. At length Innocence, when she was considered to have faithfully discharged her office, was released with Valentinian's good wishes into her native wilds.

Valentinian was a Christian but permitted liberal religious freedom to all his subjects, proscribing only some forms of rituals such as particular types of sacrifices, and banning the practice of magic. In Christian affairs, he released edicts against the increasing wealth and worldliness of the clergy. One new law, issued via Pope Damasus I, prohibited the granting of bequests to clergymen, and another said that members of the sacerdotal order must discharge the public duties owed on account of their property, or else relinquish it.

An account by Socrates Scholasticus, in his Historia Ecclesiastica, has led some to describe Valentinian as polygamous. The text says that, having heard his wife Marina Severa constantly praise the beauty of her friend Justina,

[t]he emperor, treasuring this description by his wife in his own mind, considered with himself how he could espouse Justina, without repudiating Severa, as she had borne him Gratian, whom he had created Augustus a little while before. He accordingly framed a law, and caused it to be published throughout all the cities, by which any man was permitted to have two lawful wives. The law was promulgated and he married Justina, by whom he had Valentinian the younger.

— Socrates Scholasticus, Historia Ecclesiastica, IV.31

This story is known only from Socrates, and there is no trace of any edict by any emperor allowing polygamy. Valentinian I and Severa may have divorced, a course permitted by Roman law (see marriage in ancient Rome). However, since divorce was not acknowledged by Christians, Socrates contemptuously describes him as a bigamist. It is also possible that Socrates attempted to accuse Justina, who was an Arian, of fornication, a common aspersion against other cults. According to John Malalas, the Chronicon Paschale, and John of Nikiu, the empress Severa was banished by Valentinian I for conducting an illegal transaction, before he consorted with Justina. Barnes believes this story to be an attempt to justify the divorce of Valentinian I without accusing the Emperor.

The historian Michael Grant, while noting Valentinian's unpleasant personality and bad choice of subordinates, nevertheless calls him "the last really impressive Emperor Rome ever had", and summarizes his career thus:

Valentinian was a superb soldier and a conscientious worker, endowed with ferocious energy. He felt a strong duty to the state, and, much more unusual, a strong duty to the poor, an emotion which he combined with a considerable distaste for the Roman upper class. More unusual still, in the age in which he lived, he believed in tolerating differences of religious opinion. For all his faults he would have been an outstanding man in any epoch, and it is only because of the misleading tradition which dismisses the personalities of the later Empire that most people have never heard of him.

=== Appearance ===
The coin portraits of Valentinian and Valens are of dubious quality, showing "heavy" faces rendered with "no animation, and little consistency". A more flattering physical description of Valentinian is given by Ammianus (XXX.9.6), who praises the emperor's "strong and muscular body, his brilliant complexion, his grey eyes, with a gaze that was always sidelong and stern, his fine stature, and his regular features".

== Family tree ==
Simplified Valentian family tree

Gratianus
Valens, Emp.	1)Marina Severa	Valentinian I, Emp.	2)Justina
Gratian, Emp.	Valentinian II, Emp.	2)Galla	Theodosius I, Emp.	1)Aelia Flaccilla	Serena	Stilicho
Constantius III, Emp.	Galla Placidia	Aelia Eudoxia	Arcadius, Emp.	Pulcheria	Honorius, Emp.	Maria	Eucherius
Licinia Eudoxia	Valentinian III, Emp.	Aelia Pulcheria
Placidia	Olybrius, Emp.

== See also ==
- List of Roman emperors
- Illyrian emperors

== Sources ==
=== Primary sources ===
- Ammianus Marcellinus. Rerum gestarum libri qui supersunt. W. Seyfarth, ed. 3 vols. Leipzig, 1978.
- Charles, Robert H. (2007) [1916]. The Chronicle of John, Bishop of Nikiu: Translated from Zotenberg's Ethiopic Text. Merchantville, NJ: Evolution Publishing. ISBN 9781889758879.
- Consularia Constantinopolitana. T. Mommsen ed., Monumenta Germaniae Historica, Auctores Antiquissimi. Volume 9. Berlin, 1892.
- Codex Theodosianus. T. Mommsen, P.M. Meyer, and P. Krüger, eds. Theodosiani libri XVI cum constitutionibus Sirmondianis et leges novellae ad Theodosianum pertinentes (2 vols.). Berlin, 1905.
- Corpus Inscriptionum Latinarum. Vol. 6. T. Mommsen, ed. Berlin, 1875.
- Epitome de Caesaribus. F.R. Pichlmayr, ed. Leipzig, 1961.
- Jerome. Chronicon. R. Helm, ed., in Malcolm Drew Donalson, A Translation of Jerome's Chronicon with Historical Commentary. Lewiston, NY, 1996.
- Orosius. Adversus paganos historiarum libri septem. Z. Zangemeister, ed. Corpus scriptorum ecclesiasticorum latinorum 5. Vienna, 1882.
- Socrates. Historia Ecclesiastica. J.P. Migne ed., Patrologia Graeca 67. Paris, 1864.
- Sozomen. Historia Ecclesiastica. J.P. Migne ed., Patrologia Graeca 67. Paris, 1864.
- Theoderet. Historia Ecclesiastica. J.P. Migne ed., Patrologia Graeca 82. Paris, 1864.
- Zosimus. Historia nova. François Paschoud, ed. and trans., Zosime: Histoire Nouvelle (3 vols.). Paris, 1971–89.
- Ammian, Books 26–30 Uchicago.edu. English summaries. Main text in Latin.

=== Secondary accounts ===
- Curran, John (1998). "From Jovian to Theodosius". In Averil Cameron & Peter Garnsey (eds.). The Cambridge Ancient History XIII: The Late Empire, A.D. 337–425. Cambridge University Press. ISBN 0-521-30200-5.
- Errington, R. Malcolm (2006). Roman Imperial Policy from Julian to Theodosius. Chapel Hill: University of North Carolina Press. ISBN 0-8078-3038-0.
- Edward Gibbon, The Decline and Fall of the Roman Empire, 1776.
- Grant, Michael (1985). The Roman emperors. Michael Grant Publications. ISBN 0-684-18388-9.
- Hughes, Ian (2013). Imperial Brothers: Valentinian, Valens and the Disaster at Adrianople. Pen and Sword. ISBN 978-1-4738-2863-6.
- Lenski, Noel (2003). Failure of Empire: Valens and the Roman State in the Fourth Century A.D. University of California Press. ISBN 0520928539.
- Potter, David S. (2004). The Roman Empire at Bay: AD 180–395. New York: Routledge. ISBN 0-415-10057-7.
- Roberts, Walter E. (1998). "Valentinian I (364–375 A.D)". De Imperatoribus Romanis.
- (in German) Schmidt-Hofner, Sebastian (2008a). Reagieren und Gestalten: der Regierungsstil des spaetrömischen Kaisers am Beispiel der Gesetzgebung Valentinians I [Reacting and shaping: the style of government of the late Roman emperor using the example of the legislation of Valentinian I.]. Vestigia, vol. 58. Munich: Beck, ISBN 978-3-406-57268-5.
- Schmidt-Hofner, Sebastian (2008b). "Die kaiserlichen Regesten der Jahre 364 bis 375 n. Chr." [The imperial regesta of the years 364 to 375 AD]. In: Zeitschrift der Savigny-Stiftung für Rechtsgeschichte, Romanistische Abteilung 125, pp. 498–600.
- Ernst Stein, Histoire du Bas-Empire, vol. i, chap. 4 (1959).
- Tomlin, Roger (1973). The Emperor Valentinian I.
- Chisholm, Hugh, ed. (1911). "Valentinian I." . Encyclopædia Britannica. Vol. 27 (11th ed.). Cambridge University Press. p. 851.
- Herbermann, Charles, ed. (1913). "Valentinian" . Catholic Encyclopedia. Vol. 16. New York: Robert Appleton Company.

Valentinian I Valentinianic dynasty Born: 321 Died: 17 November 375
Regnal titles
Preceded by Jovian	Roman emperor 364–375; With: Valens	Succeeded by Gratian and Valentinian II
Political offices
Preceded by Jovian; Varronianus	Roman consul 365 with Valens	Succeeded by Gratian; Dagalaifus
Preceded by Lupicinus; Iovinus	Roman consul II; 368 with Valens II	Succeeded by Valentinianus Galates; Victor
Preceded by Valentinianus Galates; Victor	Roman consul III; 370 with Valens III	Succeeded by Gratian II; Sex. Claudius Petronius Probus
Preceded by Domitius Modestus; Arintheus	Roman consul IV; 373 with Valens IV	Succeeded by Gratian III; Equitius
