= Vespasiana =

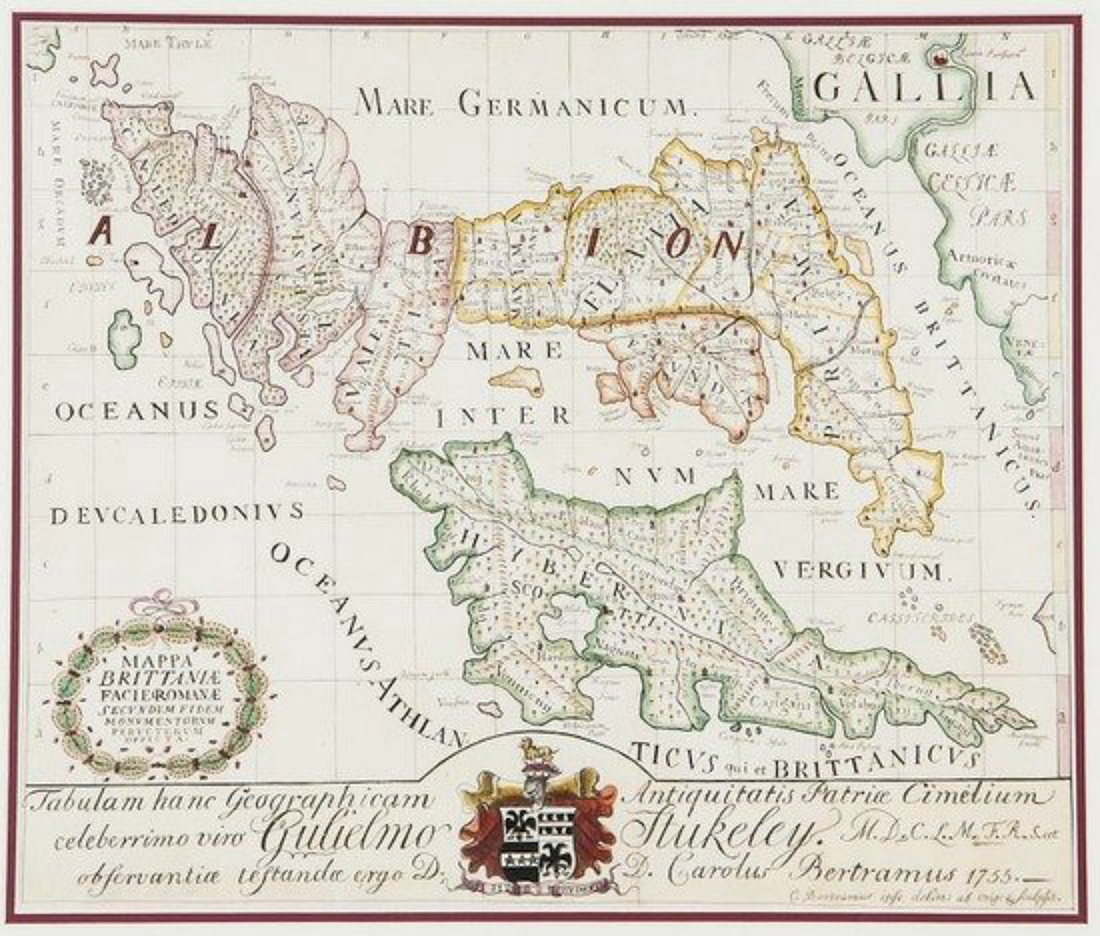
Map of Charles Bertram showing the "Vespasiana" province

Vespasiana (Latin for "Land of Vespasian") was a fictional 4th-century Roman province in Caledonia (northern Scotland) that appeared in Charles Bertram's 18th-century forgery On the State of Britain (De Situ Britanniae), which purported to be "Richard of Westminster"'s 14th-century retelling of a Roman general's contemporary account of Britain in late antiquity.

== History ==
Vespasiana was supposedly located north of the Antonine Wall. While there were fortresses (Latin: castra) erected in this territory during some of the Roman invasions, there is no surviving genuine contemporary source that calls them by the name Vespasiana or that suggests they were organized as a separate province.

The single province of Britain (Britannia) formed after Claudius's invasion in AD 43 was divided into Upper and Lower halves (Britannia Superior and Inferior) following the suppression of Clodius Albinus's revolt against Septimius Severus in the late 2nd century. Following the suppression of the late-3rd century Carausian Revolt, Roman Britain was again divided, forming Prima, Secunda, and Maxima Caesariensis. Flavia Caesariensis was formed at the same time or slightly after and Valentia was formed from a part of these or beyond Hadrian's Wall in 369, following Count Theodosius's suppression of the Great Conspiracy.

The claim in Bertram's work was that Vespasiana was formed beyond the Antonine Wall from still further conquests, either then or earlier at the time of Agricola. There are genuine sources claiming the Orkney islands (Orcades) constituted a sixth British province, but these are not generally credited by modern historians.

In the style of the genuine 3rd-century Antonine Itinerary, Bertram's work included numerous routes through Vespasiana, listing the names of and distances between the various stations. The invented places were derived from names appearing in Caesar and Tacitus.

== See also ==
- Valentia
