= Valentia (Roman Britain) =

Province of Roman Britain

Valentia Provincia Valentia (Latin)
- Province of Roman Empire (c. AD 369 - 395); Western Roman Empire (c. AD 395 - 410)
- c. AD 369 – AD 410
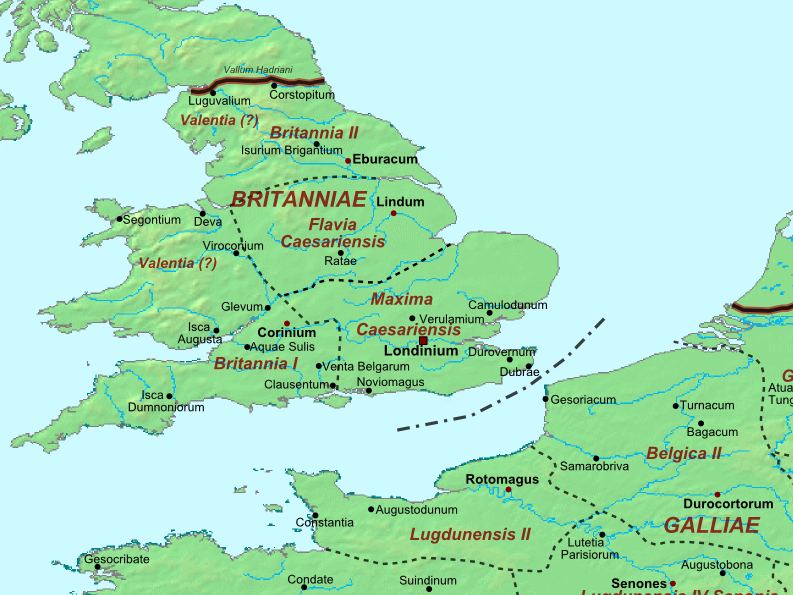
- Another possible arrangement of the late Roman provinces, with Valentia tentatively marked in Cumbria or northern Wales
- Capital: Luguvalium (modern-day Carlisle)
- Historical era: Late antiquity
  - Establishment: c. AD 369
  - Dissolution: c. AD 410
Preceded by	Succeeded by
Britannia Inferior	Sub-Roman Britain
- Today part of: United Kingdom

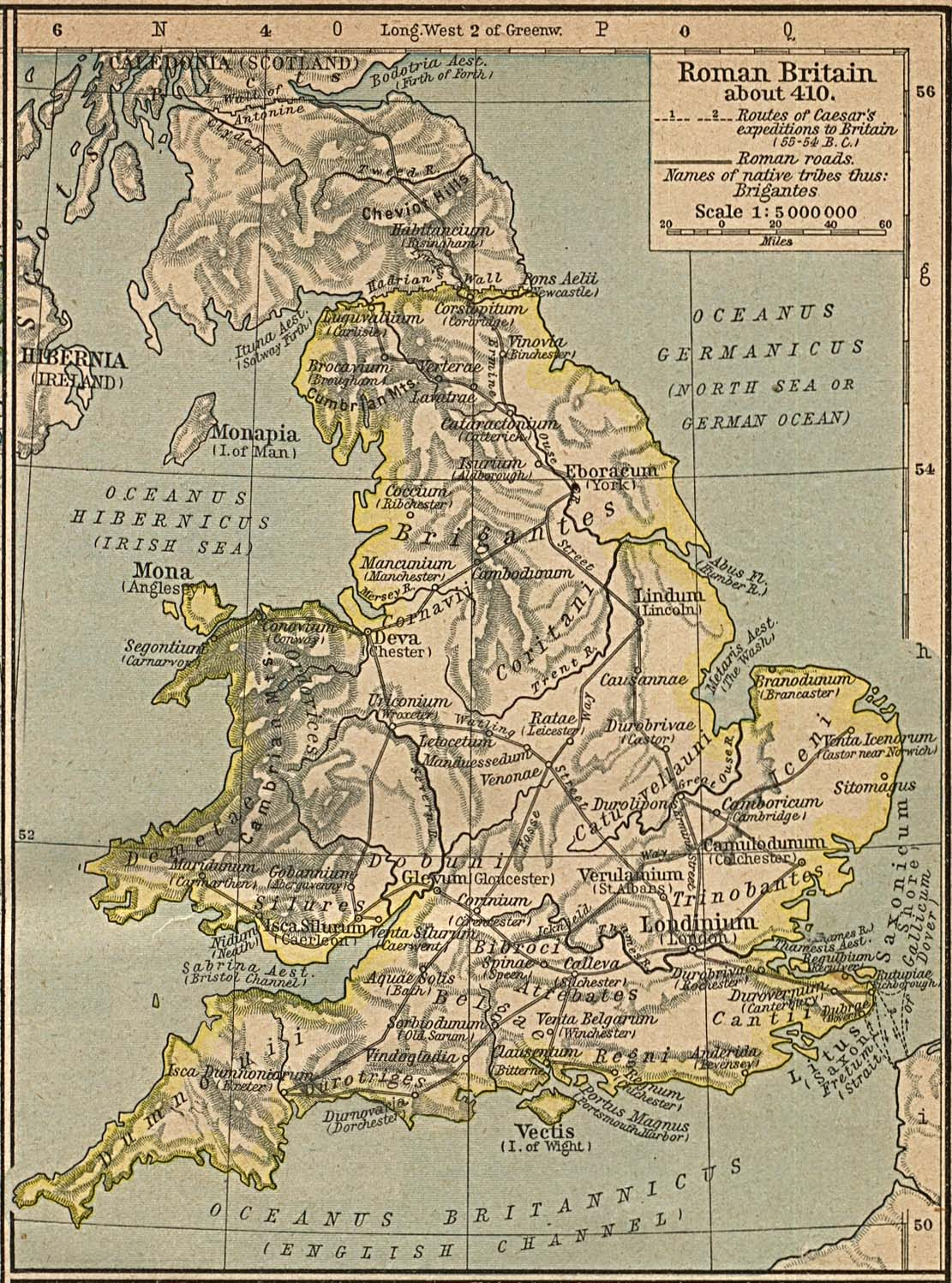
Roman Britain around AD 410, without speculative provincial borders

Valentia (Latin for "Land of Valens") was probably one of the Roman provinces of the Diocese of "the Britains" in late Antiquity. Its position, capital, and even existence remain a matter of scholarly debate. It was not mentioned in the Verona List compiled around AD 312 and so was probably formed out of one or more of the other provinces established during the Diocletian Reforms. Some scholars propose Valentia was a new name for the entire diocese, but the List of Offices names it as a consular-rank province along with Maxima Caesariensis and the other equestrian-ranked provinces. Hypotheses for the placement of Valentia include Wales, with its capital at Deva (Chester), Cumbria south of Hadrian's Wall, with its capital at Luguvalium (Carlisle), and the lands between the Antonine Wall and Hadrian's Wall, possibly with a capital at Habitancum (Risingham),, although the latter is dismissed by some modern scholars due to the absence of archaeological evidence for a Roman re-occupation of southern Scotland in the fourth century.

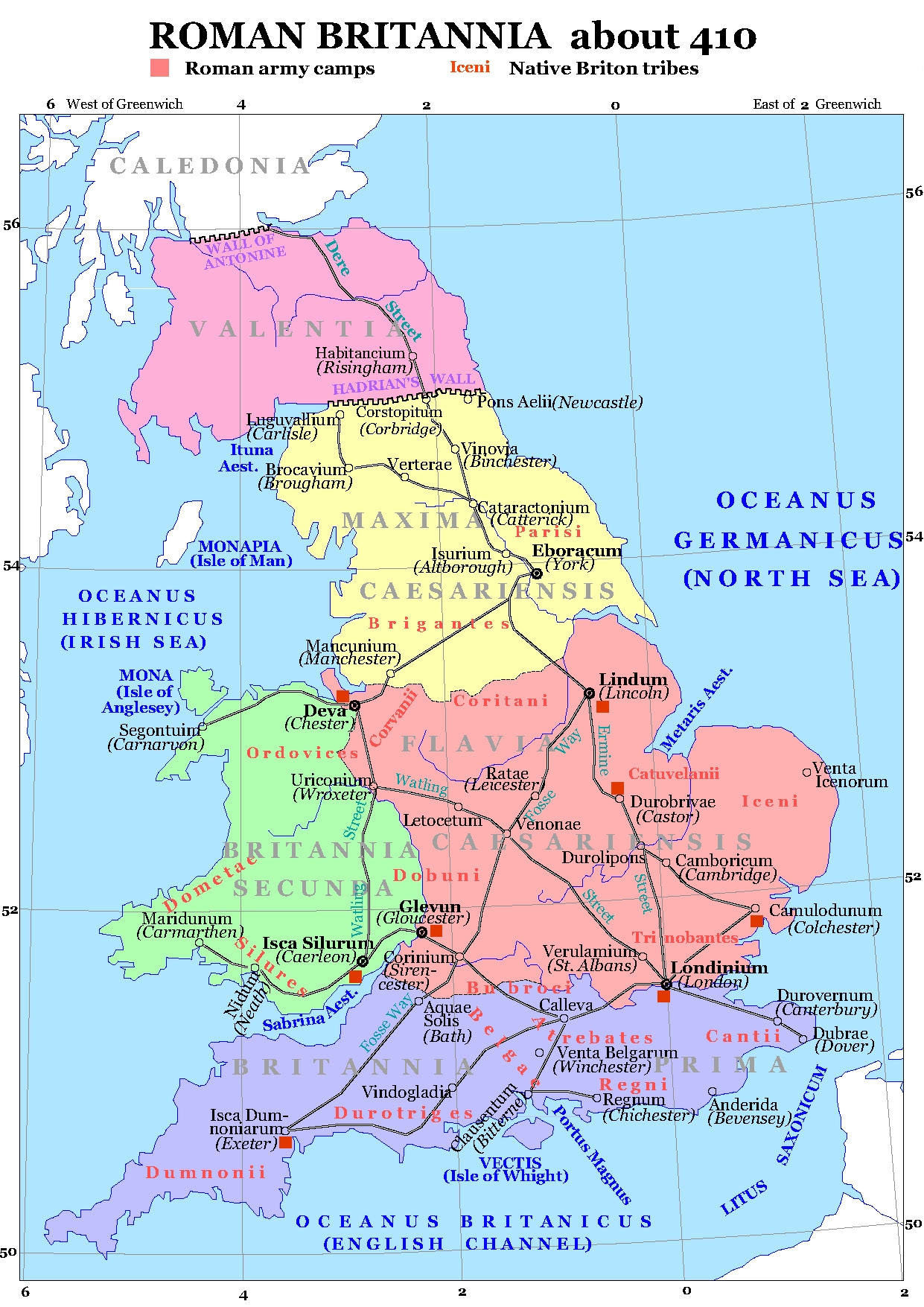
The traditional arrangement of the late Roman provinces after Camden, placing Valentia between the walls

== Name ==
Its name properly refers the Eastern emperor Valens but some also hold it to have honoured Valentinian. Some researchers such as S. H. Rosenbaum, who place Valentia in far northern Britain also believe the name included wordplay with the Latin vallum ("wall"), cf. the island Munitia (wordplay on munitio) of Aethicus Ister's Cosmography.

== History ==
Ammianus Marcellinus records that, after dealing with the Pannonian rebel Valentine, Count Theodosius the Elder

"...turned his attention to make many necessary amendments, feeling wholly free from any danger in such attempts, since it was plain that all his enterprises were attended by a propitious fortune. So he restored cities and fortresses, as we have already mentioned, and established stations and outposts on our frontiers; and he so completely recovered the province which had yielded subjection to the enemy, that through his agency it was again brought under the authority of its legitimate ruler, and from that time forth was called Valentia, by desire of the emperor, as a memorial of his success."

This occurred in AD 369. It represented the Roman recovery from the Great Conspiracy, which overran northern and western Britain in 367, alongside Germanic attacks on the Roman shores.

Ammianus speaks of the establishment of Valentia as the renaming of a recovered province (or possibly all of the territory in Britain), but the List of Offices names Valentia's governor separately alongside all four of the British provinces known from earlier sources. It is possible a new province was conquered or formed at some time after the composition of the Verona List. The List of Offices also lists two sets of troops under the Duke of the Britains (Dux Britanniarum). One covered the island's eastern shore while the second guarded the northwest coast and formed garrisons listed east to west along Hadrian's Wall. Scholars who place Valentia in Cumbria point to emendations of the surviving text's references to the western units as evidence that the area had been thoroughly overrun during the Great Conspiracy and so formed a prime candidate for Theodosius's reconquest and new command.

Ammianus also noted that the province was named "as if celebrating a minor triumph" (velut ovans). This was a lesser celebration held for unspectacular victories, as over slave revolts, and unusual for the destruction of a barbarian horde. One explanation is that the mutinous soldiers or even rebellious governors may have been involved, as full triumphs were never celebrated in victories over Roman citizens. Theodosius's lenient treatment of the conspirators involved with the rebel Valentine suggests discontent was already uncomfortably widespread.

Describing the metropolitan sees of the early British church established by SS Fagan and "Duvian", Gerald of Wales placed Valentia in Scotland and improbably fixed its bishop's seat (and thus provincial capital) at St Andrews. William Camden, looking at Ammianus, considered it the recaptured northern portion of Maxima Caesariensis, which he placed around Eboracum (York). This was generally accepted after the appearance of Charles Bertram's highly-influential 1740s forgery The Description of Britain, which placed the province between the two walls and even named the area north of the Antonine Wall as a separate province of Vespasiana. His work was, however, debunked over the course of the mid-19th century.
