= Count of the Saxon Shore =

Commander of the Roman forces along the Saxon Shore

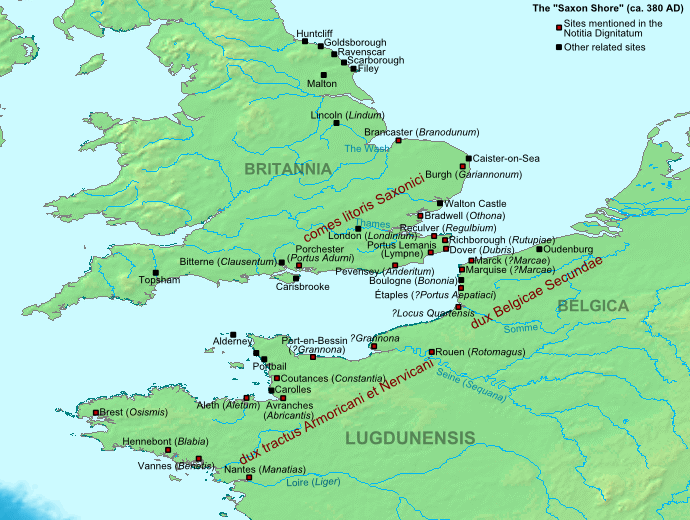
The fortifications and military commands of the Saxon Shore system extended on both sides of the English Channel.

The Count of the Saxon Shore for Britain (Latin: comes littoris Saxonici per Britanniam) was the head of the Saxon Shore military command of the later Roman Empire.

The post was possibly created during the reign of Constantine I, and was probably in existence by AD 367 when Nectaridus is elliptically referred to as such a leader by Ammianus Marcellinus. The Count's remit covered the southern and eastern coasts of Roman Britain during a period of increasing maritime raids from barbarian tribes outside the empire. The Count was one of three commands covering Britain at the time, along with the northern Dux Britanniarum and central Comes Britanniarum.

Originally, the command may have covered both sides of the English Channel as well as Britain's western coast, as Carausius's position had, but by the end of the 4th century the role had been diminished and Gaul had its own dux tractus Armoricani and dux Belgicae Secundae.

In 367, a Great Conspiracy, invasions by Picts, Franks, Saxons, Scots and Attacotti appears to have defeated the army of Britain and resulted in the death of Nectaridus. Under Count Theodosius's reforms, the command was reorganised slightly. Although Ammianus speaks of a 'conspiracy of the savages', he states that the Saxons and Franks attacked the Gallic (French) regions, while in Britain, the savages in question were only Picts, Scots and Attacotti. Eutropius had already spoken of the channel being cleared by Carausius, since the Armorican and Belgian coasts had been 'infested' with Franks and Saxons.

The 5th-century Notitia Dignitatum lists the names of the Saxon Shore forts, from Norfolk to Hampshire that were under the Count's command. Further stations up the North Sea coast were probably also his responsibility. Forces he controlled were limitanei, or frontier troops. In 401 many of his soldiers appear to have been withdrawn for the defence of Italy, rendering Britain much more vulnerable to attack. According to the Anglo-Saxon Chronicle, the eighth fort 'Anderida' was stormed by Saxons in 491 and the British garrison and inhabitants exterminated.
