= Comes Britanniarum =

Commander of the Roman field army in Britain during the fourth century

The shield of the Equites Taifali, a Taifal mercenary corps serving under the comes of Britain.

The Comes Britanniarum (Latin for "Count of the Britains") was a military post in Roman Britain with command over the mobile field army from the mid-4th century onwards. It is listed in the List of Offices as being one of the three commands in Britain, along with the Dux Britanniarum and the Comes litoris Saxonici. His troops were the main field army (comitatenses) in Britain and not the frontier guards (limitanei) commanded by the other two.

== Appointment ==
Archaeologists Timothy W. Potter and Catherine Johns believe that the Comes Britanniarum led an ad hoc force created to deal with a particular situation. They seem to have been appointed during times of crisis. It appears the title was temporary and did not remain for long, and certainly did not have the permanence of the Dux Britanniarum and the Comes litoris Saxonici, but for the duration of the crisis the Comes Britannarum had chief command of Roman military forces in Britain.

The first "Count" in Britain was Gratianus Funarius, the father of emperor Valentinian I. He may have commanded a task force of comitatenses under emperor Constans during his campaign on the island in the winter of 342–3.

During the Great Conspiracy, Count Theodosius, the father of emperor Theodosius I, also served as "Count" in Britain. A permanent office was created later in the fourth or early fifth century, perhaps by Stilicho who withdrew troops from Britain to defend Italy in 402.

According to the Notitia Dignitatum, there was a unit called the Equites Taifali established by Honorius under the Comes Britanniarum in Britannia. This unit may have been the same unit as the Equites Honoriani seniores mentioned around the same time.

According to the List of Offices the count commanded six cavalry and three infantry units, probably a force of no more than 6,000 troops. This small force was charged with supporting the frontier troops in fending off the increasing number of barbarian raids during the period. Some units seem to have been transferred from the Duke of Britain's or Count of the Saxon Shore's armies. The office presumably was extinguished with the Roman withdrawal from Britain by 410.

== Counts of the Britains ==
- Gratianus Funarius
- Theodosius the Elder
- Magnus Maximus
