= Maximinus (praetorian prefect) =

Roman barrister

Maximinus was a Roman barrister and Praetorian Prefect of the later fourth century AD.

== Origins ==
Maximinus was born in Sopianae, Pannonia. His family was of Carpic origin. Maximinus' father was an accountant in the provincial government office of Pannonia Valeria.

Maximinus studied law, and practiced as an attorney. Later he was appointed to the governor of Corsica, Sardinia and Tuscia. He became prefectus annonae in Rome, and used this important position to launch a witch-hunt against the Roman senatorial aristocracy. At first he also kept his gubernatorial office because his successor was slow to arrive.

== Trials ==
He made his name prosecuting members of the Roman aristocracy on charges of witchcraft, encouraged by emperor Valentinian I. Valentinian's prejudice against the Roman nobility brought the two men close together. The praefectus urbi of Rome, Olybrius was ill and weak, so Maximinus took the chance to seize the judicial authority.

Historian Ammianus Marcellinus gives a detailed description about these unjust trials in the 28th book of his work. He calls Maximinus a "wild beast" and "diabolic inquisitor". After he gained the consent of the emperor Maximinus became excessively confident, and "walked on the streets of the city almost dancing like a brahmin."

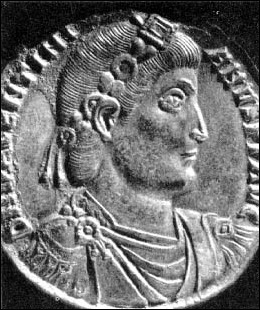
Emperor Valentinian I

The famous victims of Maximinus' witch hunt were Marinus (attorney), Cethegeus senator, the young Lollianus (son of the former praefectus Lampadius), two noblewomen, Claritas and Flaviana, Paphius and Cornelius senators, Campensis haruspex and others. All of them were tortured to extort their "confessions". Maximinus prosecuted Hymetius, the former proconsul of Africa province, but the man appealed to the emperor. Valentinianus handed over the case to the Senate which only sent Hymetius into exile to the great rage of the emperor.

According to Marcellinus a string was attached to the side window of the praetorial office of Maximinus, where the anonymous informers could have hooked their denunciations in a letter. Maximinus also employed many spies.

In 369 AD, Maximinus' brother-in-law Valentinus committed an unrecorded but very serious crime. Maximinus was able to have Valentinus' sentence commuted from execution to exile and he was sent to Britain where he began planning a revolt that had to be put down by Count Theodosius.

== Prefect of Gaul ==
Within a year, Maximinus had been promoted to vicarius of Rome and then served as praetorian prefect of Gaul from 13 July 371 to 16 April 376, providing a direct link between the emperor and the civil administration in Roman Britain and Gaul. When Valentinian was replaced by Gratian, Maximinus was removed from his post as part of a purge of the old regime. He was later executed under Gratian (Ammianus, Histories, XXVIII, 1, 57).

== Sources ==
- Jones, A.H.M.; J.R. Martindale & J. Morris (1971). Prosopography of the Later Roman Empire. Vol. 1. Cambridge University Press. ISBN 0-521-07233-6.
- Kelly, Gavin (2013). "The Political Crisis of AD 375–376" (PDF). Chiron. 43: 357–409. Archived from the original (PDF) on 2021-06-20.
- Potter, David S. (2004). The Roman Empire at Bay: AD 180–395. New York: Routledge. ISBN 0-415-10057-7.
- Rodgers, Barbara Saylor (1981). "Merobaudes and Maximus in Gaul". Historia. 30 (1): 82–105. JSTOR 4435744.
