= Attacotti =

People that raided Roman Britain

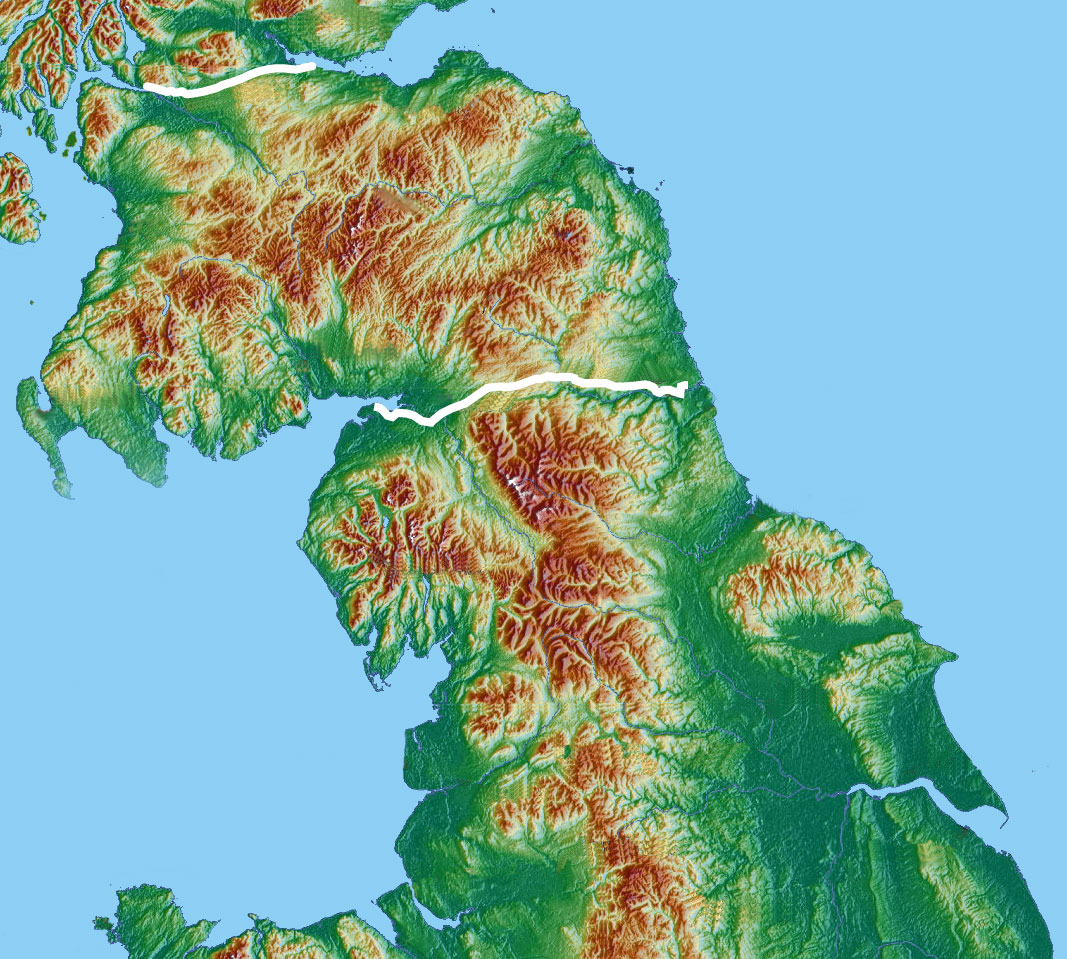
A map of northern Roman Britain and the land between Hadrian's Wall and the Antonine Wall.

Attacotti, Atticoti, Attacoti, Atecotti, Atticotti, and Atecutti were Latin names for a people first recorded as raiding Roman Britain between 364 and 368, alongside the Scoti, Picts, Saxons, Roman military deserters and the indigenous Britons themselves. The marauders were defeated by Count Theodosius, father of Roman Emperor Theodosius I, in 368.

The exact origins of the Attacotti and the extent of their territory are uncertain, although historians usually place them in either Scotland or Ireland. In about 400, Roman units recruited among the Attacotti were recorded in the Notitia Dignitatum, and one tombstone of a soldier identified as such is known. Their existence as a distinct people is given additional credence by two incidental claims that they practised cannibalism and polyandry (taking multiple husbands) in the writings of Saint Jerome.

== Ammianus: Roman Britain in 364–369 ==
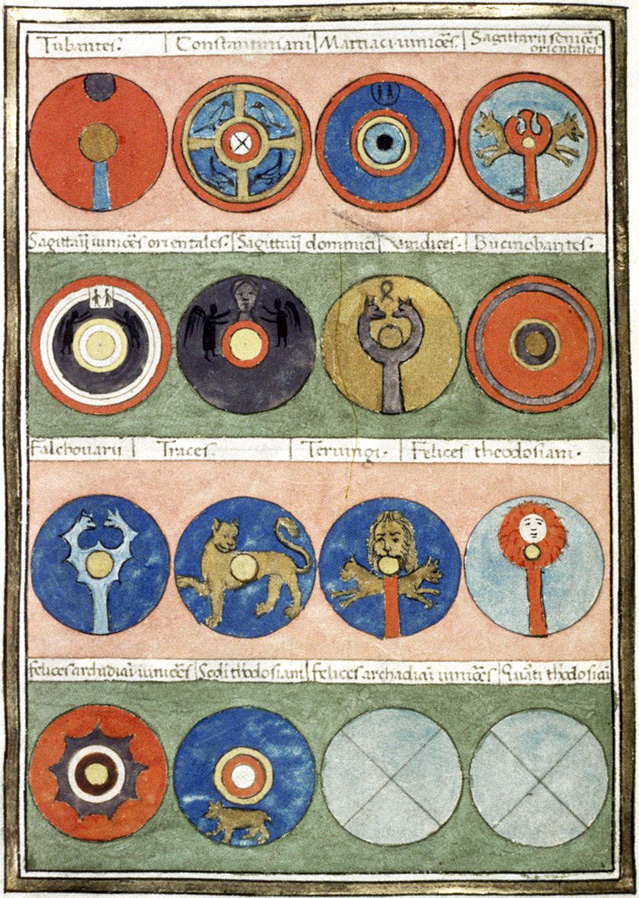
A page from a medieval copy of the Notitia Dignitatum.

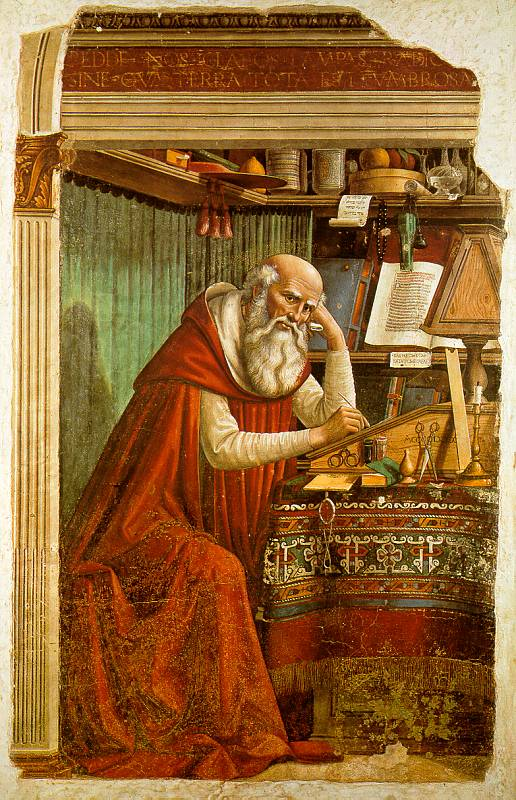
Saint Jerome in His Study, by Domenico Ghirlandaio.

The historian Ammianus provides an account of the tumultuous situation in Britain between 364 and 369, and he describes a corrupt and treasonous administration, native British troops (the Areani) in collaboration with the barbarians, and a Roman military whose troops had deserted and joined in the general banditry. The situation arose as a consequence of the failed imperial power-grab (350–353) by Magnentius (303–353), followed by a bloody and arbitrary purge conducted by Paulus Catena in an attempt to root out potential sympathisers of Magnentius in Britain, and aggravated by the political machinations of the Roman administrator Valentinus.

Ammianus describes the marauders as bands moving from place to place in search of loot. Nevertheless, one Roman commander was killed in a pitched battle and another was taken prisoner in an ambush and killed. (See Great Conspiracy.) As there was no longer an effective military force in the province, a substantial one was sent from Gaul under Count Theodosius, who quickly and ruthlessly restored order. Theodosius then focused his efforts on the repair of political problems within the province.

== Notitia Dignitatum: Roman auxilia palatina ==
The Notitia Dignitatum is a list of offices of the early 5th century Roman Empire, and includes the locations of the offices and the staff (including military units) assigned to them. The names of several auxilia palatina resemble that of the Attacotti who were mentioned by Ammianus, and in an 1876 publication, historian Otto Seeck assigned the name Atecotti to various spellings ("acecotti", "atecocti", "attecotti", "attcoetti", "[illegible]ti", and "arecotti") in the Notitia Dignitatum, and documented his assignments within the publication. This produced four conjectural occurrences of Atecotti-related units:

- Atecotti
- Atecotti juniores Gallicani
- Atecotti Honoriani seniores
- Atecotti Honoriani juniores

The discovery of a contemporary funerary dedication to a soldier of the "unit of Atecutti" (emended from "Ategutti") at Thessalonica, in the Roman Diocese of Illyricum, supports this reconstruction, as the Notitia Dignitatum places one Atecotti unit in that diocese.

== Saint Jerome: Incidental references ==
St. Jerome was a Christian apologist whose writings contain two incidental references to the Attacotti. His account is particularly noteworthy because he was in Roman Gaul c. 365–369/70, while the Attacotti were known to be in Britain until 368 and may have entered Roman military service soon after. Thus it is credible that Jerome had seen Attacotti soldiers and had heard Roman accounts of the recent fighting in Britain.

In his Letter LXIX. To Oceanus, he is urging a responsible attitude towards marriage, at one point saying that one should not be "like the Scots [i.e., the Irish Scoti] and the Atacotti, and the people of Plato's Republic, to have community of wives and no discrimination of children, nay more, to be aware of any semblance even of matrimony".

In his treatise Against Jovinianus he describes the dietary habits of several peoples and includes a statement that he had heard that the Attacotti ate human flesh. Earlier in the same passage he describes a different people as eating "fat white worms with blackish heads", and others as eating "land-crocodiles" and "green lizards". Ancient writers sometimes ascribed exotic habits to far-away peoples in their works. Strabo, for example, said in passing that some Sarmatians and Scythians were cannibals, while others ate no meat at all.

== De Situ Britanniae: A spurious reference ==
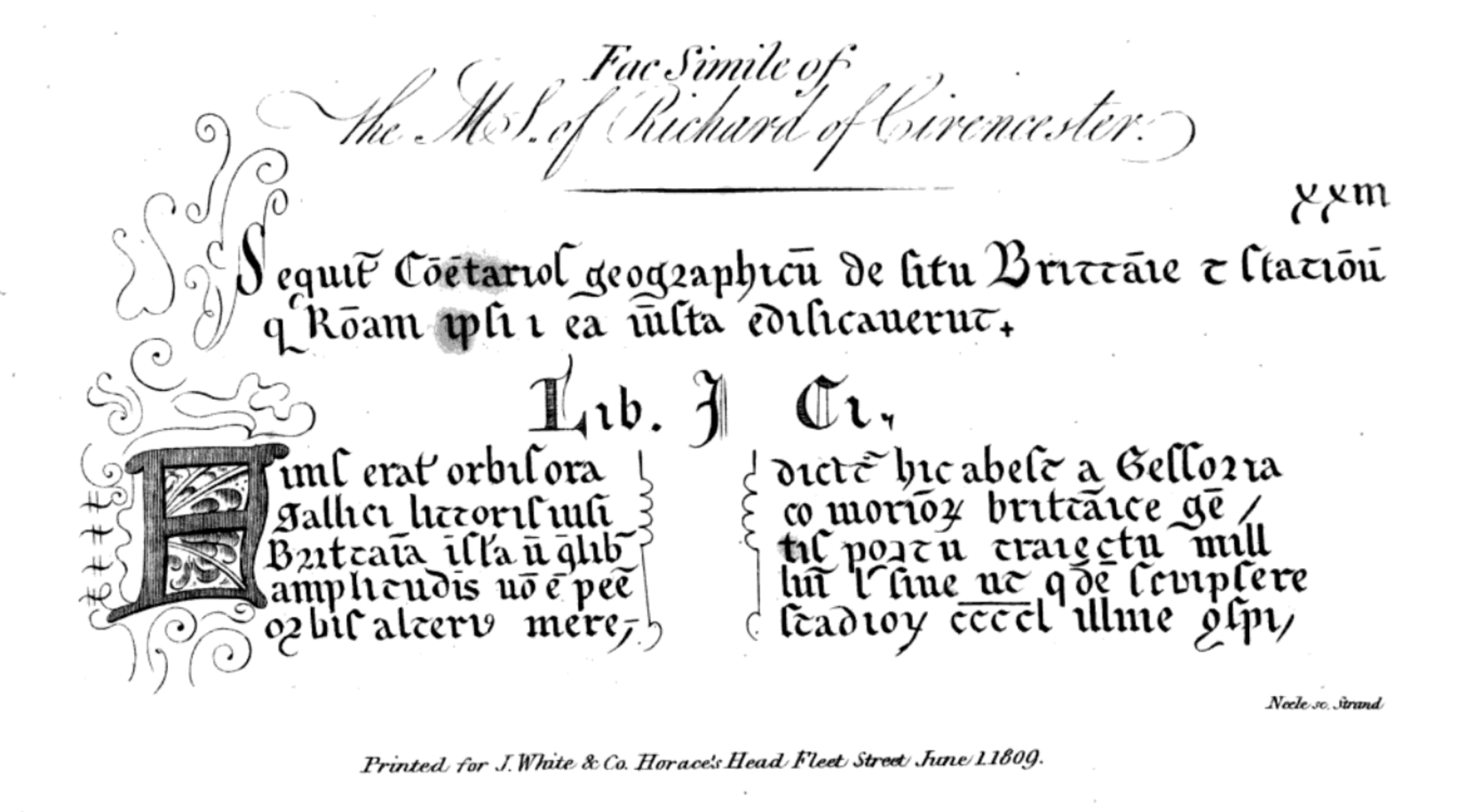
A part of the spurious De Situ Britanniae.

De Situ Britanniae was a fictitious account of the peoples and places of Roman Britain. It was published in 1757, after having been made available in London in 1749. Accepted as genuine for more than one hundred years, it was virtually the only source of information for northern Britain (i.e., modern Scotland) for the time period, and some historians eagerly incorporated its spurious information into their own accounts of history. The Attacotti were mentioned in De Situ Britanniae, and their homeland was specified as just north of the Firth of Clyde, near southern Loch Lomond, in the region of Dunbartonshire.

This information was combined with legitimate historical mentions of the Attacotti to produce inaccurate histories and to make baseless conjectures. For example, Edward Gibbon combined De Situ Britanniae with St. Jerome's description of the Attacotti by musing on the possibility that a ‘race of cannibals’ had once dwelt in the neighbourhood of Glasgow.

== Archaeological evidence ==
The Greenloaning Stone in the Scottish Stirling Smith Museum and Art Gallery contains an inscription possibly connected to the Attacotti. The inscription was originally dismissed as a fake, before being re-dated to the 1st or 2nd century AD and deciphered as V Atiqatti Donati. This may refer to the name of a Roman officer who took his name from the Attacotti, suggesting a family connection.

== Possible Irish connection ==
Charles O'Conor's 1783 representation of the original Irish form of "Athech-tuatha", used when he connected them to the British Attacotti.

John O'Donovan's 1844 representation of the original Irish, which he translated as "Attacottic district", or "territorium Attacotticum".

Perhaps as early as the 17th century, and certainly in the 18th and 19th centuries, some Irish scholars (Charles O'Conor and John O'Donovan, for example) had suggested that the origin of the Attacotti might lie in Ireland. This was based on the perceived similarity between Latin Attacotti and the Old Irish term aithechthúatha, a generic designation for certain Irish population groups, usually translated 'rent-paying tribes', 'vassal communities' or 'tributary peoples'. In the context of well-attested Irish raids on the western coast of Britain in the late Roman period, it was suggested that one or more of these population groups might be the raiders reported by Ammianus in the 360s.

The thesis was given impetus when historian Charles O'Conor promoted it in the late 18th century. However, this remained controversial among scholars into the late 19th century.

Later scholarship has criticised the possible connection between Latin Attacotti and aithechthúatha on etymological grounds. Early scholars had based their arguments on the Old Irish that was known from medieval manuscripts rather than on the largely hypothetical Primitive Irish used in the 4th century when the Attacotti were in Britain.

Knowledge and understanding of the history of the Irish language were revolutionised from the end of the 19th century, largely owing to the efforts of Rudolf Thurneysen (1857–1940). He hypothesised that Attacotti and aithechthúatha are unconnected, and that the Primitive Irish equivalent to aithechthúatha would be *ateûiācotōtās. This, in his opinion, is too far removed from the Latin form Attacotti in Ammianus. More recent research has shown that some of the Irish population groups involved in the raiding and settlement of Roman and/or sub-Roman Britain could be classified as aithechthúatha; however, problems of chronology and identification persist.

== See also ==
- Cannibalism in Europe

== Bibliography ==
- Bertram, Charles (1809) [1757], Hatcher, Henry (ed.), The Description of Britain, Translated from Richard of Cirencester, London: J. White and Co.
- Feissel, Denis (1983), Recueil des Inscriptions Chrétiennes de Macédoine du IIIe au VIe Siècle, Paris: De Boccard, OCLC 214631387.
- Freeman, Philip (2001), Ireland and the Classical World, Austin: University of Texas Press.
- Freeman, Philip (2002), "Who Were the Atecotti?". J. F. Nagy (ed.), Identifying the "Celtic" ([Celtic Studies Association of North America Yearbook 2] Dublin, 2002), 111–114.
- MacNeill, Eoin, "Early Irish Population Groups: Their Nomenclature, Classification and Chronology", in Proceedings of the Royal Irish Academy 29. 1911–1912. pp. 59–114. JSTOR 25502794.
- MacRitchie, David (1884). Ancient and Modern Britons: A Retrospect. Vol. I. London: Kegan Paul, Trench & Company. pp. 104–105.
- Morris, John (1973). The Age of Arthur: A History of the British Isles from 350 to 650. London: Weidenfeld and Nicolson. ISBN 978-0-684-13313-3.
- Rance, Philip (2001). "Attacotti, Deisi and Magnus Maximus: The Case for Irish Federates in Late Roman Britain". Britannia. 32: 243–270. doi:10.2307/526958. JSTOR 526958. S2CID 162836712.
- Scharf, Ralf (1995), "Aufrüstung und Truppenbenennung unter Stilicho: Das Beispiel der Atecotti-Truppen" (in German), Tyche 10: 161–178. doi:10.15661/tyche.1995.010.12.
- Schaff, Philip; Wace, Henry, eds. (1893), St. Jerome: Letters and Select Works, 2nd, vol. 6, New York: The Christian Literature Company.
- Seeck, Otto, ed. (1876), Notitia Dignitatum Accedunt Notitia Urbis Constantinopolitanae et Laterculi Prouinciarum, Berolini.
- Yonge, C. D., ed. (1894), The Roman History of Ammianus Marcellinus, London: George Bell & Sons.
