= 5th century in England =

Events from the 5th century in England. Note that many of these dates may only be approximate.

== Events ==
- 401
  - Stilicho withdraws troops from Britain, and abandons forts on the Yorkshire coast.
- 402
  - Last issue of Roman coinage in Britain.
- 405
  - Niall of the Nine Hostages leads Irish raids along the south coast.
- 407
  - Army in Britain proclaims Constantine III as Emperor.
- 409
  - Army rebels against Constantine.
  - Saxons raid Britain.
- 410
  - Emperor Honorius recalls the last legions from Britain.
- 429
  - The Pope sends Saint Germanus to Britain, who defeats the Pelagians in public debate.
- c.430
  - Vortigern, supposed king of the Britons, allows Anglo-Saxon mercenaries to settle on the Isle of Thanet.
  - Fastidius completes his work On the Christian Life.
- 433
  - The Britons call the Angles to come and help them as mercenaries against the Picts.
- 446
  - The "Groans of the Britons": Britons appeal (possibly to the Consul Flavius Aetius) for the Roman army to come back to Britain.
- 447
  - Saint Germanus returns to Britain and exiles Pelagian heretics.
- 449 (traditional date)
  - Vortigern, supposed king of the Britons, invites Hengist and Horsa, by tradition chieftains of the Jutes, to form a military alliance against the Picts and Scoti; by tradition, they land at Ebbsfleet, Thanet, so contributing to the Anglo-Saxon settlement of Britain (according to Bede).
- c.450
  - Hengist founds the Kingdom of Kent.
- 455
  - Battle of Aylesford: Hengist and Horsa defeat Vortigern, although Horsa dies in the battle.
- 457
  - Battle of Crayford: Hengist and Oisc of Kent (Æsc) defeat the Britons, driving them from Kent.
- 466
  - Battle of Wippedesfleot: Celtic Britons (Welsh) perhaps defeat the Anglo-Saxons (Jutes) under Hengist and Oisc in battle in Kent and confine them to the Isle of Thanet, but a dozen Welsh leaders are killed.
- 473
  - Hengist and Oisc again fight against the Britons.
- 477
  - Ælle lands at Selsey, and founds the Kingdom of Sussex.
- 485
  - Ælle fights against the Britons near the margin of Mearcræd's stream.
- 491
  - Ælle and his son Cissa besiege Anderitum, the Saxon Shore fort at Pevensey, and kill all the Britons there.
- 495
  - Cerdic, later the first King of Wessex, lands at Southampton.
- c.500
  - Battle of Mons Badonicus: Britons defeat advancing Saxons, and retain control of the north and west.
