= Areani =

Late Roman military reconnaissance force based in Roman Britain

The areani (or arcani) were a specialized military reconnaissance force of the Imperial Roman army based in Roman Britain during the 4th century AD. Stationed in the frontier zone along Hadrian's Wall, their primary duty was to conduct covert reconnaissance far beyond the wall into Caledonia, monitoring tribal movements, bribing chieftains, and warning Roman commanders of potential incursions.

== History ==
The areani are known to have operated during the military campaigns of Emperor Constans in Britain around AD 343. Operating in the paramilitary zone between Hadrian's Wall and the Antonine Wall, they ranged deep into enemy territory to gather intelligence on neighboring tribes.

The areani played a treacherous role during the Great Conspiracy of 367–368 AD, a massive coordinated invasion of Roman Britain by Picts, Scots, Attacotti, and Saxons. Having been corrupted by promises of plunder and bribes from barbarian leaders, they betrayed Roman positions and passed intelligence regarding Roman troop movements to the invaders.

Following the restoration of Roman authority in Britain by Count Theodosius, the areani were formally tried, removed from their posts, and disbanded.

=== Account of Ammianus Marcellinus ===
The principal historical source for the areani comes from the 4th-century historian Ammianus Marcellinus (Res Gestae, Book XXVIII, Chapter 3):

Ammianus Marcellinus (XXVIII.3.8)	English translation
...haec etiam praecipua. Areanos genus hominum a veteribus institutum, super quibus aliqua in actibus Constantis rettulimus, paulatim prolapsos in vitia a stationibus suis removit: aperte convictos, acceptarum promissarumque magnitudine praedarum allectos, quae apud nos agebantur, aliquotiens barbaris prodidisse. id enim illis erat officium, ut ultro citroque [per longa spatia] discurrentes, vicinarum gentium strepitus nostris ducibus intimarent...	"During these outstanding events the areani, who had gradually become corrupt, were removed by him [Theodosius] from their positions. This was an organization founded in early times, of which I have already said something in the history of Constans. It was clearly proved against them that they had been bribed with quantities of plunder, or promises of it, to reveal to the enemy from time to time what was happening on our side. Their official duty was to range backwards and forwards over long distances with information for our generals about disturbances among neighbouring nations."

== Etymology and Identity ==
The term areani is a hapax legomenon, appearing only once in classical literature within the text of Ammianus Marcellinus. Several theories exist regarding their name and origins:

- Etymology from Area: Historians such as C. E. Stevens suggested areani derives from area ("sheep-fold" or open field), referring to the pastoral frontier settlements where these scouts lived between Hadrian's Wall and the Scottish border.
- Transcription of Arcani: Scholars such as I. A. Richmond argued that areani is a scribal error for arcani ("the secret ones" or "hidden ones"). This interpretation is supported by epigraphic evidence from Vindolanda, where Vindolanda Tablet 162 contains the line miles arcanu... ("an arcanus soldier").
