= Gratianus Funarius =

Roman army officer

Gratianus
- Born: Cibalae, Pannonia Secunda
- Died: before 24 August 367
- Issue: Valentinian I Valens
- Dynasty: Valentinianic

Gratianus "Funarius" (fl. 4th century) was an Illyrian soldier of the Roman Empire who flourished in the 4th century. He was the father of Roman emperors, Valentinian I and Valens, founders of the Valentinianic dynasty.

== Life ==
Gratianus originated from the town of Cibalae (Vinkovci), in southern Pannonia Secunda (modern Croatia), possibly in the 280s. During his youth, he obtained the nickname Funarius, meaning "the rope-man" because he was a rope salesman. Gratianus joined the army and rose through the ranks to become protector domesticus during the reign of Constantine the Great. A protector domesticus named "...atianus" is attested at Salona (Split) during this time, leading some to think Gratianus could have been stationed there. Gratianus's first independent command was as a tribune, probably in the mobile field army of Constantine. During the late 320's or early 330's he was made comes of Africa, possibly to supervise the frontier. However, Gratianus was soon accused of embezzlement and was forced to retire. Gratianus was recalled during the early 340s and was made comes of Britannia. He may have been recalled to command a unit of comitatenses under emperor Constans I during his campaign on the island in the winter of 342/3. After his military career ended, Gratianus returned to his birthplace and lived as a private citizen with good reputation.

In Gratianus's retirement, the emperor Constantius II confiscated all of his estates because of his suspected support of the usurper Magnentius. Nevertheless, he was still popular within the army; this popularity could have contributed to the successful careers of his sons.

His death is not mentioned in literary sources. The PLRE cites as inscription dedicated to him, dated to the year 367 at the latest, and presumes he was dead by that time. Drijvers additionally observed that, since his grandson of the same name was not named in the inscription, the elder Gratian must have died before his grandson’s accession on 24 August 367. After his son Valens became emperor, the Senate in Constantinople decreed a brass statue of him.

== Family tree ==
Simplified Valentian family tree

Gratianus
Valens, Emp.	1)Marina Severa	Valentinian I, Emp.	2)Justina
Gratian, Emp.	Valentinian II, Emp.	2)Galla	Theodosius I, Emp.	1)Aelia Flaccilla	Serena	Stilicho
Constantius III, Emp.	Galla Placidia	Aelia Eudoxia	Arcadius, Emp.	Pulcheria	Honorius, Emp.	Maria	Eucherius
Licinia Eudoxia	Valentinian III, Emp.	Aelia Pulcheria
Placidia	Olybrius, Emp.

== Sources ==
=== Works cited ===
- Drijvers, Jan Willem (2015). "Ammianus Marcellinus 30.7.2–3: Observations on the Career of Gratianus Maior". Historia: Zeitschrift für Alte Geschichte. 64 (4): 479–486. doi:10.25162/historia-2015-0020. JSTOR 45019208.
- Hughes, Ian (5 August 2013). Imperial Brothers: Valentinian, Valens and the Disaster at Adrianople. Pen and Sword. ISBN 978-1-4738-2863-6.
- Kienast, Dietmar; Eck, Werner; Heil, Matthäus (2017) [1990]. Römische Kaisertabelle: Grundzüge einer römischen Kaiserchronologie (in German) (6 ed.). Darmstadt: Wissenschaftliche Buchgesellschaft. ISBN 978-3-534-26724-8.
- Martindale, John R.; Jones, A. H. M.; Morris, John, eds. (1971). The Prosopography of the Later Roman Empire: Volume I, AD 260–395. Cambridge: Cambridge University Press. ISBN 0-521-07233-6.
- Lenski, Noel Emmanuel (2002). Failure of empire: Valens and the Roman state in the fourth century A.D. University of California Press. ISBN 978-0-520-23332-4.
- Tomlin, R. S. (1973), The Emperor Valentinian I, OCLC 163531986
- Williams, Stephen; Friell, Gerard (1994). Theodosius: The Empire at Bay. Yale University Press. ISBN 978-0-300-07447-5.
