= Agape, Chionia, and Irene =

Christian martyr saints of Thessalonica

Saints Agape, Chionia, and Irene
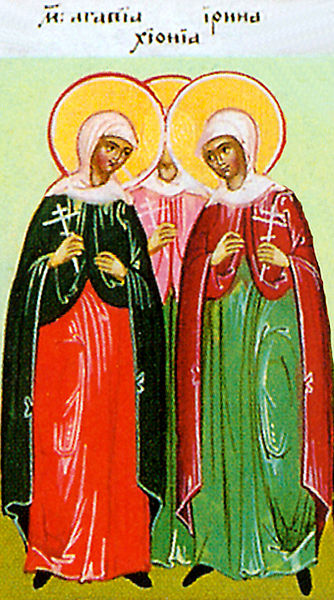
- Agape, Chionia, and Irene
- Born: Aquileia
- Died: AD 304; Thessalonica
- Venerated in: Catholic Church; Eastern Orthodox Church
- Feast: April 1 Agape & Chionia (Catholic, new 2004 Roman Martyrology, traditional date April 3) April 5 Irene (Catholic) April 16 (Eastern Churches)

Saint Agape, Saint Chionia and Saint Irene (Greek: Αγάπη, Χιονία και Ειρήνη) were sisters and Christian saints from Aquileia, martyred at Thessalonica in 304 AD. Agape and Chionia were charged with refusing to eat sacrificial offerings, whilst Irene was killed for keeping Christian books in violation of existing law. All were condemned to be burned alive.

== Legend ==
Orphaned at a young age, the sisters Agape, Chionia, and Irene led pious lives under the direction of the priest Xeno. They declined a number of offers of marriage. In 303, Emperor Diocletian issued a decree making it a capital offense to possess Christian scriptures. The sisters hid their copies.

Eventually, they were arrested for offending the Imperial cult by not eating food that had been sacrificed to the gods. They were brought before Emperor Diocletian, who could not persuade them to renounce their faith, and as he was leaving for Macedonia, brought them with him. There they were taken to the court of Dulcitius, governor of Thessalonica.

The sisters repulsed the governor's indecent advances. Annoyed with Dulcitius as ineffectual, Diocletian turned the three young women over to Count Sisinus for trial. He imprisoned Irene, the youngest; and making no headway in getting the older two to recant, ordered them to be burned. According to Christian tradition, after the immolation, the decedents appeared to be merely asleep as neither their clothes nor bodies had been scorched. After the deaths, their house was searched and the scriptures found and publicly burned.

Sisinus ordered Irene to be taken to a brothel, but on the way the escort was intercepted by two soldiers who told them to abandon her on a mountain. When they returned Sisinus grew angry as he had given no such orders. He pursued Irene and she was wounded in the throat with an arrow, at which point she died.

Four other individuals were tried with the sisters: Agatho, Casia, Philippa and Eutychia. Of these, one woman was remanded as she was pregnant. The fates of the other three are unknown.

== Legacy ==
The story of their martyrdom is the subject of a 10th-century medieval Latin drama by the secular canoness, Hrotsvitha of Gandersheim.

The island of Santorini is named after a cathedral established honoring Irene in the island village of Perissa.

== Sources ==
- Attwater, Donald & John, Catherine Rachel. The Penguin Dictionary of Saints. 3rd edition. New York: Penguin Books, 1993. ISBN 0-14-051312-4.
- Schiavo, Anthony P. (2018). I Am A Christian: Authentic Accounts of Christian Martyrdom and Persecution from the Ancient Sources. Merchantville, NJ: Arx Publishing. ISBN 978-1-935228-18-9. (Includes the complete English translation of the ancient Acts of Agape, Chionia and Irene)
- Full online text of Hrotsvitha's play, Dulcitius, Fordham University.
