= Nectaridus =

Nectaridus was an early Count of the Saxon Shore, a military leader in Roman Britain in the later fourth century AD.

His command may have been an ad hoc creation, possibly during the reign of Valentinian I or Julian during the early 360s, in response to growing pirate raiding. His military command probably extended beyond Britain to include maritime forces protecting both sides of the English Channel.

Ammianus records that he was killed in 367 AD during the Great Conspiracy, and the loss of such a high-ranking official would have been a blow to Roman prestige.

His replacement is not known, and the post may have been only a proto-version of the later office of Count.
