= Abanni =

Ancient tribe under the Roman Empire

- Ancient Libyan tribe
- Ethnicity: Ancient Libyans (Berbers)
- Location: Mauretania Sitifensis
- Language: Old Libyan
- Religion: Libyan religion

The Abanni (also called Abannae) were an ancient Libyan tribe in the northwest of Africa.

They settled in the ancient region of Mauretania, which encompassed the north of the present-day states of Morocco and Algeria and was part of the Roman Empire in the first centuries anno Domini. Together with the adjacent tribe of the Caprarienses, whose members lived in the mountains named after them, the Abanni in circa 375 AD took part in the uprising of the usurper Firmus against the Roman Emperor Valentinian I. Both tribes were defeated by the Roman general Theodosius. After this success Theodosius is believed to have subsequently moved to Auzia.

According to the German classical philologist and epigraphist Johannes Schmidt (1850–1894) the Abanni probably lived in the Roman province of Mauretania Sitifensis. The Roman historian Ammianus Marcellinus states that they settled not far from the Ethiopians, possibly on the edge of the Saharan Atlas mountain chain. This localization seems to be confirmed by the Latin poet Claudian in a passage of his eulogy of the fourth consulate of Emperor Honorius. Here it is narrated that Theodosius travelled through the Ethiopian desert and advanced as far as the Atlas mountains. The French archaeologist Charles-Joseph Tissot (1828–1884) believes the modern Aït-Abenn, who live in the mountains northwest of M'Sila, Algeria, to be descendants of the ancient Abanni.
