= Dulcitius =

Roman official

Dulcitius may refer to either of two ancient Roman officials active in the fourth century AD.

- Dulcitius (Macedonia) was governor of Macedonia during the reign of the emperor Diocletian. He is chiefly remembered for his role in a hagiographic tale of the persecution of several Christian women in Thessalonica, in 304 AD. As such, he is the eponymous villain of Dulcitius, a 10th-century drama written by Hrotsvitha of Gandersheim.
- Dulcitius (Britannia) was a military leader praised for his abilities by the soldier-historian Ammianus Marcellinus. Although it is not actually stated by Ammianus in his original text, it is often conjectured that Dulcitius was elevated to the position of Dux Britanniarum. If this is the case, he is thought to have been brought to Britain in 369 AD by Count Theodosius in the aftermath of the Great Conspiracy, in which Roman rule on the island faced simultaneous challenge from internal rebellion and external invasion. He might have been appointed Dux as a replacement for Fullofaudes, who is likely to have been killed or lost somewhere in the north of Britain. The Roman rebel Valentinus and his associates were handed over to Dulcitius for execution.
