= Valentinus (rebel) =

Roman criminal and rebel

Valentinus (fl. mid-4th century, died 369) was a Roman criminal and rebel put down after Count Theodosius's arrival in Britain in AD 369.

Ammianus Marcellinus records that Valentinus was a Pannonian whose brother-in-law Maximinus was close to the emperor Valentinian I. Having committed some serious crime, he was able to have his sentence commuted to exile to Britain, where he resided at the time of the Great Conspiracy. Ammianus does not record that Valentinus took part in that barbarian rising, but does claim that he began planning a new revolt after the arrival of Theodosius. He organized fellow exiles and attempted to bribe local troops to his cause. Discovered, he was given over to Duke Dulcitius for execution, but Ammianus notes that investigation into Valentinus's plot was cursory, lest it produce more unrest in the province.
