= Marina Severa =

Roman empress from 364 to 370

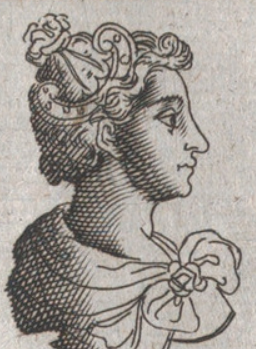
- Imaginary portrait (1587)

Empress of the Roman Empire
- Tenure: 364 – 370 AD
- Died: before 21 February 382
- Burial: Church of the Holy Apostles, Constantinople (now Istanbul, Turkey)
- Spouse: Valentinian I
- Issue: Gratian
Names
- Marina Severa
- Dynasty: Valentinian

Marina Severa (died before 382) was a Roman empress as the first wife of Valentinian I, and the mother of Gratian. The primary sources give two different names for her. John Malalas, the Chronicon Paschale and John of Nikiû name her "Marina" while all other sources call her "Severa". (Note: Socrates of Constantinople, Jordanes, Theodorus Lector, Chronicon Altinate, Zonaras)

== Life ==
Marina Severa was married to Valentinian before he ascended to the throne. Their son Gratian was born in 359 at Sirmium in Pannonia. Valentinian was chosen as emperor in 364, and Gratian was elevated to the position of co-emperor in 367. He divorced his wife around 370 to marry Justina, widow of the usurper Magnentius.

According to Socrates of Constantinople:

"Justina being thus bereft of her father, still continued a virgin. Some time after she became known to Severa, wife of the emperor Valentinian, and had frequent intercourse with the empress, until their intimacy at length grew to such an extent that they were accustomed to bathe together. When Severa saw Justina in the bath she was greatly struck with the beauty of the virgin, and spoke of her to the emperor; saying that the daughter of Justus was so lovely a creature, and possessed of such symmetry of form, that she herself, though a woman, was altogether charmed with her. The emperor, treasuring this description by his wife in his own mind, considered with himself how he could espouse Justina, without repudiating Severa, as she had borne him Gratian, whom he had created Augustus a little while before. He accordingly framed a law, and caused it to be published throughout all the cities, by which any man was permitted to have two lawful wives."

This account was dismissed by later historians whose interpretation of it was an unlikely legalization of bigamy. However Timothy Barnes and others consider this decision to only allow various Romans to divorce and then remarry. The controversy being that Christianity had yet to accept the concept of a divorce. Barnes considers that Valentinian was willing to go forth with the legal reformation in pursuit of dynastic legitimacy that would secure his presence on the throne.

Theodorus Lector and Jordanes also agreed that Severa introduced Justina to Valentinian and told him about her beauty.

John Malalas, the Chronicon Paschale and John of Nikiû report Marina to have been banished because of involvement in an illegal transaction. Barnes considers this story to be an attempt to justify the divorce of Valentinian I without blaming the emperor. According to John of Nikiû, Marina tricked a woman of lesser rank into selling her a garden for a fraction of its value.

"[She] had not paid her the price which it was equitably worth, because the valuers had valued (it) out of regard to the empress and so had inclined to do her a favour. And when the pious Valentinian was apprised of what his wife had done… he was wroth with the empress (and) removed her from his presence and drove her from the palace and took to wife a woman named Justina, with whom he lived all the rest of his days. As for his first wife, he drove and exiled her from the city, and gave back the garden to the woman who had sold it."

Ammianus mentioned Gratian being influenced by his mother, indicating that he kept her close as an advisor when he became senior emperor.

Although Valentinian died in 375, his burial in the Church of the Holy Apostles in Constantinople did not take place until years later, on 21 February 382. His first wife was already dead by that point, as she was buried next to him.

== Sources ==
- Charles, Robert H. (2007) [1916]. The Chronicle of John, Bishop of Nikiu: Translated from Zotenberg's Ethiopic Text. Merchantville, NJ: Evolution Publishing. ISBN 9781889758879.
- Johnson, Mark J. (1991). "On the Burial Places of the Valentinian Dynasty". Historia: Zeitschrift für Alte Geschichte. 40 (4): 501–506. JSTOR 4436217.

Royal titles
Preceded by Charito	Roman Empress consort 364–c. 370 with Domnica (364–c. 370)	Succeeded by Justina; In the Western Roman Empire
Preceded by Charito	Roman Empress consort 364–c. 370 with Domnica (364–c. 370)	Succeeded by Domnica; In the Eastern Roman Empire
Preceded by Eutropia	Empress-Mother of Rome; 370–375	Succeeded by Justina
