= Fullofaudes =

Fullofaudes was a Dux Britanniarum, a military leader in Roman Britain in the later fourth century.

He was either killed or besieged by the barbarian invaders during the Great Conspiracy and replaced by Dulcitius when Count Theodosius came to Britain in 369 to restore order.

He was probably defeated in the north of Britain; the outpost forts north of Hadrian's Wall were abandoned at this time. It may be that his own troops rebelled under him and switched allegiance to the enemy; Ammianus' description is unclear.
