= Chiron (journal) =

- Discipline: Classics
- Language: English

Publication details
- History: 1971–present
- Publisher: Walter de Gruyter
- Frequency: Annually

Standard abbreviations
- ISO 4: Chiron

Indexing
- ISSN: 0069-3715

Links
- Journal homepage

Chiron. Mitteilungen der Kommission für Alte Geschichte und Epigraphik des Deutschen Archäologischen Instituts (English: Chiron: Correspondence of the Commission for Ancient History and Epigraphy in the German Archaeological Institute) is an academic journal on ancient history. It is edited by the Munich-based Kommission für Alte Geschichte und Epigraphik of the German Archaeological Institute.

The journal was established in 1971. In both 2007 and 2011 the journal received an "INT1" ranking (internationally recognised with high visibility) from the European Reference Index for the Humanities. An issue appears once per year, generally in December. Each volume includes a list of dissertations in ancient history completed in Germany in the relevant year.

Until 2005, Chiron was published by Verlag C. H. Beck; in 2006 it was acquired by Walter de Gruyter.
