= Great Conspiracy =

Uprising against Roman rule of Britain (367-368)

The Great Conspiracy
- Part of the Roman occupation of Britain
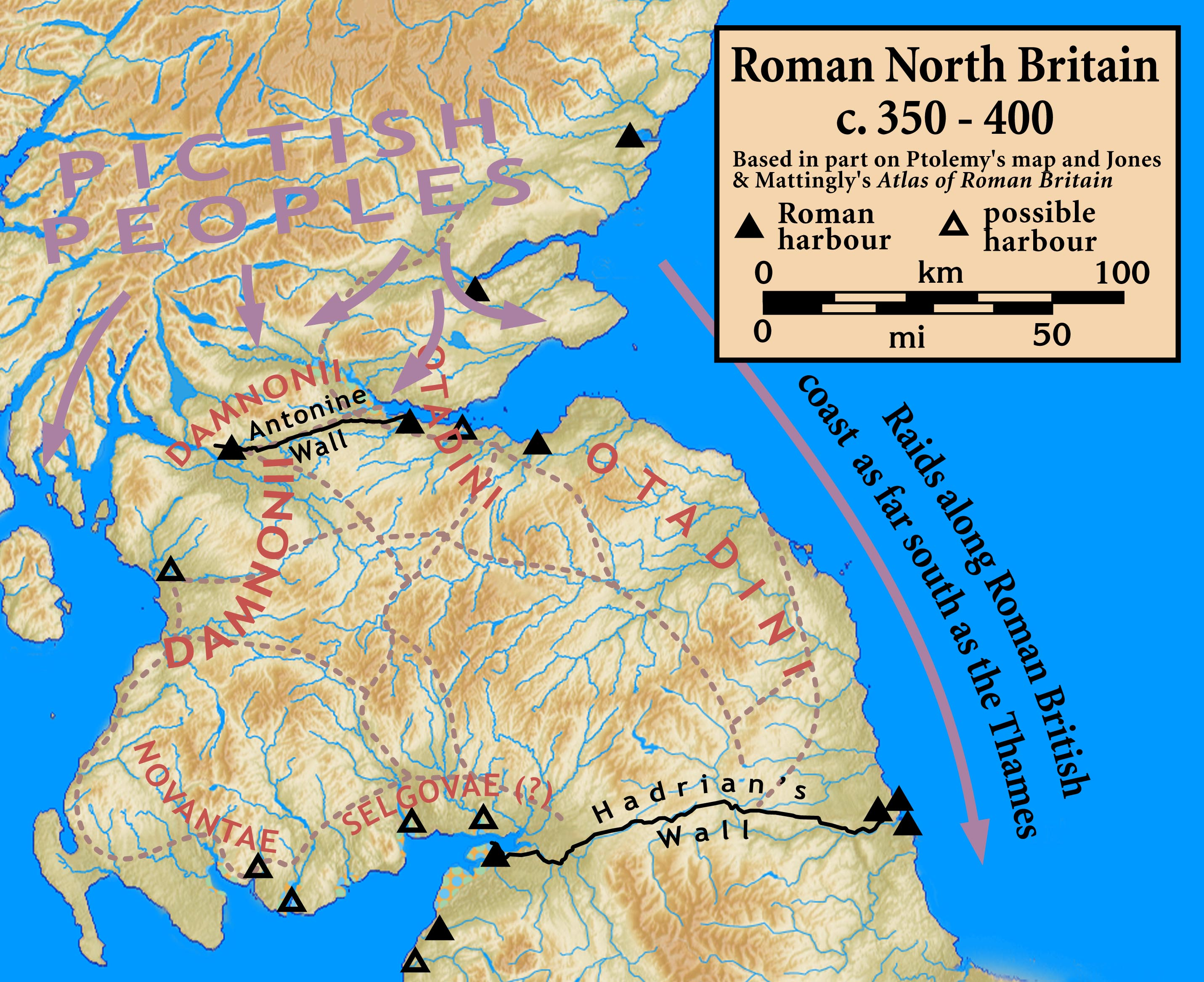
- Northern Roman Britain, c. 350–400 AD.
Date	367–368
Location	Roman Britain
Result	Roman victory

Belligerents
Roman Empire	Picts; Scoti; Attacotti; Saxons; Franks; Roman deserters rebellious Britons

Commanders and leaders
Nectaridus †; Fullofaudes; Severus; Jovinus; Theodosius the Elder	Valentinus and others

The Great Conspiracy was a year-long state of war and disorder that occurred near the end of Roman rule in Britain. Fourth-century Roman historian Ammianus Marcellinus describes it as a barbarica conspiratio ('barbarian conspiracy') which took advantage of a depleted military force in the province; many soldiers had marched away with General Magnentius in his unsuccessful bid to become emperor. Few returned, and supply, pay, and discipline in the following years may have been deficient.

The precise chronology of events remains unclear. Ammianus, although being the author of the most comprehensive and widely-cited surviving sources on the Conspiracy, was living in Antioch during the time that it took place. His account is thus likely to be derived from other sources and exhibits inconsistencies with other known documentation. The nature and the causes of the events is therefore not entirely clear. While it has been posited that this period of unrest correlates, or was even caused by, extraordinary droughts in Britain in preceding years, this link seems tenuous and is not supported by historical evidence.

== Conspiracy ==
According to Ammianus, the following events occurred: In the winter of 367, the Roman garrison on Hadrian's Wall rebelled and allowed Picts from Caledonia to enter Roman Britain. Simultaneously, Attacotti (of uncertain origin), Scoti from Hibernia, and Saxons from Germania landed in what might have been coordinated and pre-arranged waves on the island's mid-western and south-eastern borders. The war bands managed to overwhelm nearly all of the loyal Roman outposts and settlements. The entire western and northern areas of Britannia were overwhelmed; the cities sacked; and the civilian Romano-British murdered, raped, or enslaved. Franks and Saxons also landed in northern Gaul.

Nectaridus, the comes maritime tractus ('count of the coastal region'), was killed, and a dux, Fullofaudes, was either besieged or captured. The locations of their defeats are often supposed to have been in Britain but may have been in Gaul. The remaining loyal army units stayed garrisoned inside southeastern cities.

The milites areani, the local Roman agents who provided intelligence on barbarian movements, seem to have betrayed their paymasters for bribes which made the attacks completely unexpected. Deserting soldiers and escaped slaves roamed the countryside and turned to robbery to support themselves. Although the chaos was widespread and initially concerted, the rebels had aims simply of personal enrichment and worked as small bands rather than larger armies.

== Roman response ==
=== Early attempts ===
Emperor Valentinian I was campaigning against the Alamanni at the time and so was unable to respond personally. A series of commanders to act in his stead were chosen but swiftly recalled. The first was Severus, the emperor's comes domesticorum, who was recalled and replaced by Jovinus, the magister equitum. Jovinus then wrote back to Valentinian requesting reinforcements. The emperor recalled Jovinus, probably to take part in a campaign along the Rhine, which was a higher priority, and then sent out Flavius Theodosius. It has been supposed that Severus and Jovinus travelled to Britain to make their findings and back to the emperor to report, but Ammianus does not state this, and the known chronology of Valentinian's movements at the time (recorded by edicts in the Codex Theodosianus) would make it difficult for them to do so before the summer was over. They may only have traveled to areas that barbarians had attacked in northern Gaul.

=== Arrival of Theodosius ===
In the spring of 368, a relief force commanded by Theodosius gathered at Bononia (Boulogne-sur-Mer). It included four units, Batavi, Heruli, Iovii, and Victores, as well as his son, the later Emperor Theodosius I, and probably the later usurper Magnus Maximus, his nephew. Theodosius took advantage of a break in the winter weather to cross the English Channel to Richborough, which left the rest of his troops at Bononia to await better weather. That enabled Theodosius to gather vital intelligence. He discovered that the Roman troops had been overwhelmed, refused to fight, or deserted, and many may not have been paid. Once the rest of his troops had landed, Theodosius marched with them to Londinium, which he intended to make his base. Approaching the city, he began to deal with the invaders:

There he divided his troops into many parts and attacked the predatory bands of the enemy, which were ranging about and were laden with heavy packs; quickly routing those who were driving along prisoners and cattle, he wrested from them the booty which the wretched tribute-paying people had lost. And when all this had been restored to them, except for a small part which was allotted to the wearied soldiers, he entered the city, which had previously been plunged into the greatest difficulties, but had been restored more quickly than rescue could have been expected, rejoicing and as if celebrating an ovation.

— Ammianus Marcellinus, Res Gestae 27.8.6

An amnesty was promised to deserters, which enabled Theodosius to regarrison abandoned forts. A new Dux Britanniarum was appointed, Dulcitius, with Civilis granted vicarius status to head a new civilian administration. After discovering that the local areani had collaborated with the invaders, Theodosius removed them from their positions. By the end of the year, the barbarians had been driven back to their homelands; the mutineers had been executed; Hadrian's Wall had been retaken, and order had returned to the diocese. Under Civilis's rule, the last of the earlier invaders were temporarily driven out in 369, possibly using troops under his own personal command, and a program of civil restoration began. Theodosius also overcame and defeated the force of Valentinus, a Pannonian who had been exiled to Britain and joined the invaders.

Considerable reorganization was undertaken in Britain, including the creation of Valentia, probably to better address the state of the far north. The poet Claudian suggests that naval activity took place in northern Britain. It is possible that Theodosius mounted punitive expeditions against the barbarians and imposed terms upon them. Certainly, the Notitia Dignitatum later records four units of Attacotti serving Rome on the continent. The areani were removed from duty and the frontiers refortified with co-operation from border tribes such as the Votadini, which marked the career of men such as Paternus.

== Political effects ==
Theodosius returned to Rome a hero and was made senior military advisor to Valentinian to replace Jovinus. A decade later, his son became emperor.

The Romans had ended much of the chaos, but raids by all of the peoples listed above continued.

== Fictional references ==
Fictional accounts of the Great Conspiracy are featured in Wallace Breem's historical novel Eagle in the Snow, Peter Vansittart's historical novel Three Six Seven: Memoirs of a Very Important Man, Stephen R. Lawhead's fantasy novel Taliesin, M. J. Trow's Britannia series, Jack Whyte's fantasy-historical novel The Skystone, and Mark Chadbourn's novel Pendragon, written under the pen-name James Wilde. Francis Hagan uses the Great Conspiracy as the backdrop for his trilogy of books in the Sabinus Chronicles (The Unquiet Shore, The Reaping of the Sea, and The Vengeful Tide). In the novels, a former tribune, Sabinus, brings Roman and barbarian forces together to save Rome from itself.
