= Scoti =

Latin name for the Gaels

Scoti or Scotti is a Latin name for the Gaels, first attested in the late 3rd century. It originally referred to all Gaels, first those in Ireland and then those who had settled in Great Britain as well; it later came to refer only to Gaels in northern Britain. The kingdom to which their culture spread became known as Scotia or Scotland, and eventually its inhabitants came to be known as Scots.

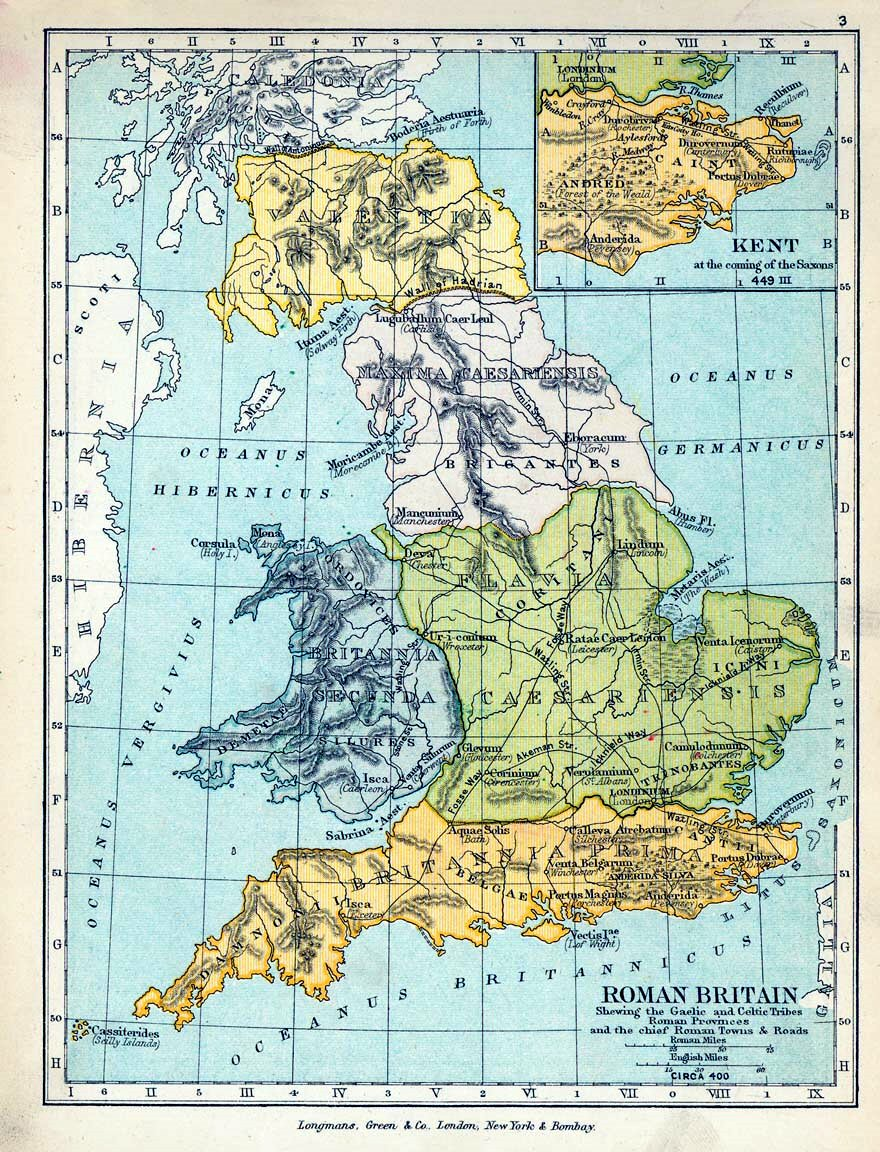
A map of the Roman divisions of Britain with the Scoti shown as a tribal grouping in the north of Ireland

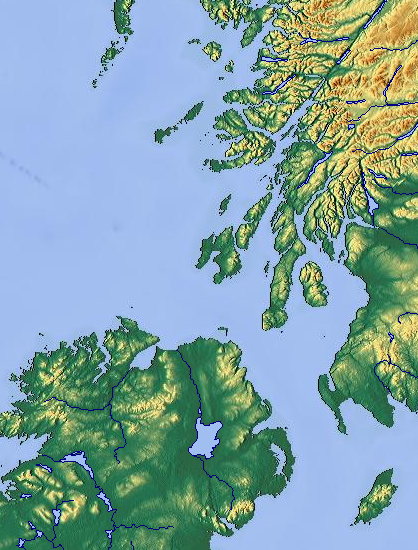
A map of Ulster and the Hebrides. Scotia or the "Land of the Scots". By the time of King Robert I, Ireland was known as Scotia Maior (greater Scotia) and Scotland was known as Scotia Minor (lesser Scotia). Following the 11th century, Scotia was used almost exclusively for Alba or Scotland.

== History ==
An early use of the word can be found in the Nomina Provinciarum Omnium (Names of All the Provinces), which dates to about AD 312. This is a short list of the names and provinces of the Roman Empire. At the end of this list is a brief list of tribes deemed to be a growing threat to the Empire, which included the Scoti, as a new term for the Irish. There is also a reference to the word in St Prosper's chronicle of AD 431 where he describes Pope Celestine sending St Palladius to Ireland to preach "ad Scotti in Christum" ("to the Scots who believed in Christ").

Thereafter, periodic raids by Scoti are reported by several later 4th and early 5th century Latin writers, namely Pacatus, Ammianus Marcellinus, Claudian and the Chronica Gallica of 452. Two references to Scoti have been identified in Greek literature (as Σκόττοι), in the works of Epiphanius, Bishop of Salamis, writing in the 370s. The fragmentary evidence suggests an intensification of Scoti raiding from the early 360s, culminating in the barbarian conspiracy of 367–368, and continuing up to and beyond the end of Roman rule c. 410. The location and frequency of attacks by Scoti remain unclear, as do the origin and identity of the Gaelic population-groups who participated in these raids.

By the 5th century, the Gaelic or Scottish kingdom of Dál Riata had emerged in the area of modern Scotland that is now Argyll. Although this kingdom was destroyed and subjugated by the Pictish kingdom of the 8th century under Angus I, the convergence of Pictish and Gaelic languages over several centuries resulted in the English labelling Pictland under Constantine II as Scottish in the early 10th century, first attested in AD 920, viewing the Picts as speaking a Gaelic tongue. The growing influence of the English and Scots languages from the 12th century with the introduction of Norman-French knights and southerly expansion of Scotland's borders by David I saw the terms Scot, Scottish and Scotland also begin to be used commonly by natives of that country.

== Etymology ==
The etymology of Late Latin Scoti is unclear. It is not a Latin derivation, nor does it correspond to any known Goidelic (Gaelic) term the Gaels used to name themselves as a whole or a constituent population group. Several derivations have been conjectured, but none has gained general acceptance in mainstream scholarship.

In the 19th century, Aonghas MacCoinnich proposed that Scoti came from Gaelic sgaothaich, meaning 'crowd' or 'horde'.

Charles Oman (1910) derived it from Gaelic scuit, meaning someone cut off. He believed it referred to bands of outcast Gaelic raiders, suggesting that the Scots were to the Gaels what the Vikings were to the Norse.

More recently, Philip Freeman (2001) has speculated on the likelihood of a group of raiders adopting a name from an Indo-European root, *skot, citing the parallel in the Ancient Greek skotos (σκότος), meaning "darkness, gloom".

Linguist Kim McCone (2013) derives it from the Old Irish noun scoth meaning "pick", as in "the pick" of the population, the nobility, from an Archaic Irish reconstruction *skotī.

An origin has also been suggested in a word related to the English scot ("tax") and Old Norse skot; this referred to an activity in ceremonies whereby ownership of land was transferred by placing a parcel of earth in the lap of a new owner, whence 11th-century King Olaf, one of Sweden's first known rulers, may have been known as a scot king.

== See also ==
- Attacotti
- Caledonia
- Déisi
- Gaelic Ireland
- Name of Britain
- Picts
- Uí Liatháin

== Bibliography ==
- Freeman, Philip (2001), Ireland in the Classical World (University of Texas Press: Austin, Texas. ISBN 978-0-292-72518-8
- Rance, Philip (2012), 'Epiphanius of Salamis and the Scotti: new evidence for late Roman-Irish relations', Britannia 43: 227–242
- Rance, Philip (2015),'Irish' in Y. Le Bohec et al. (edd.), The Encyclopedia of the Roman Army (Wiley-Blackwell: Chichester/Malden, MA, 2015).
