= Dux Britanniarum =

Commander of the Roman army in Northern England

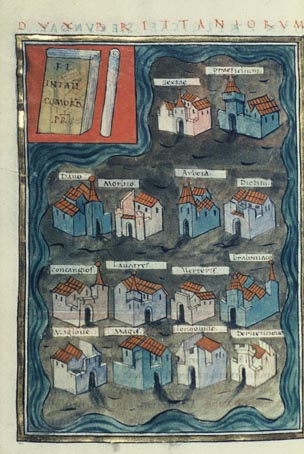
Notitia Dignitatum: The castles Sextae, Praesidium, Dano, Morbio, Arbeia, Dictim, Concangios, Lavatres, Verteris, Barboniaco, Maglove, Magis, Longovicio and Derventione of Hadrian's Wall, under the command of the Dux Britanniarum.

Dux Britanniarum was a military post in Roman Britain, probably created by Emperor Diocletian or Constantine I during the late third or early fourth century. The Dux (literally, "(military) leader") was a senior officer in the late Roman army of the West in Britain. It is listed in the Notitia Dignitatum as being one of the three commands in Britain, along with the Comes Britanniarum and Count of the Saxon Shore.

His responsibilities covered the area along Hadrian's Wall, including the surrounding areas to the Humber estuary in the southeast of today's Yorkshire, Cumbria and Northumberland to the mountains of the Southern Pennines. The headquarters were in the city of Eboracum (York). The purpose of this buffer zone was to preserve the economically important and prosperous southeast of the island from attacks by the Picts (tribes of what are now the Scottish lowlands) and against the Scoti (Irish raiders).

== History ==
The Dux Britanniarum was commander of the troops of the Northern Region, primarily along Hadrian's Wall. The position carried the rank of viri spectabiles, but was below that of the Comes Britanniarum. His responsibilities would have included protection of the frontier, maintenance of fortifications, and recruitment. Provisioning the troops would have played a significant part in the economy of the area. The Dux would have had considerable influence within his geographical jurisdiction, and exercised significant autonomy due in part to the distance from headquarters of his superiors.

The Notitia Dignitatum lists the garrison along Hadrian's Wall (along with several sites on the coast of Cumbria) under the command of the Dux Britanniarum. Archaeological evidence shows that other units must have been stationed here, which are not, however, mentioned in the Notita. Most of them were established during the 3rd Century.

== Castles and units ==
His troops were limitanei or frontier guards and not the comitatenses or field army commanded by the Comes Britanniarum. Fourteen units in north Britain are listed in the Notitia as being under his command, stationed in either modern Yorkshire, Cumbria or Northumberland. Archaeological evidence indicates there were other posts occupied at the time which are not listed. His forces included three cavalry vexillationes with the rest being infantry. They were newly raised units rather than being third century creations. In addition to these fort garrisons, the dux commanded the troops at Hadrian's Wall: the Notitia lists their stations from east to west, as well as additional forts on the Cumbrian coast. These troops appear to have been third century regiments, although the reliability of the Notitia makes it difficult to infer any solid information from it.

From Chapter XL:

sub dispositione viri spectabilis Ducis Britanniarum (literally "made available to the most honorable military commander of the British provinces")

...in addition to the administrative staff (Officium) lists 14 prefects and their units with their deployment locations under the command of this Dux:

- Praefectus Legionis sextae
- Praefectus Numeri directorum, Verteris
- Praefectus Numeri exploratorum, Lavatrae
- Praefectus Equitum Dalmatarum, Praesidio
- Praefectus Equitum Crispianorum, Dano
- Praefectus Numeri defensorum, Barboniaco
- Praefectus Equitum, catafractariorum, Morbio
- Praefectus Numeri Solensium, Maglone
- Praefectus Numeri barcariorum Tigrisiensium, Arbeia
- Praefectus Numeri Pacensium, Magis
- Praefectus Numeri Nerviorum Dictensium, Dicti
- Praefectus Numeri Longovicanorum, Longovicium
- Praefectus Numeri vigilum, Concangis
- Praefectus Numeri supervenientium Petueriensium, Deruentione (Derventio?)

Then follow the garrisons along Hadrian's Wall (per item lineam Valli):

- Cohortis quaternary Lingonum, Segedunum
- Tribune Alae Petrianae, Petriana
- Praefectus cohortis primae Cornoviorum, Pons Aelius
- Tribune Alae primae Asturum, Cilurnum or Cilurvum
- Praefectus Numeri Maurorum Aurelianorum, Aballaba
- Praefectus cohortis primae Frixagorum, Vindobala
- Tribune cohortis secundae Lingonum, Segedunum
- Tribune Alae Sabinianae, Hunnum or Onnum
- Praefectus cohortis primae Hispanorum, Uxelodunum or Petriana
- Tribune Alae secundae Asturum, Aesica
- Praefectus cohortis secundae Thracum, Gabrosenti
- Tribune cohortis primae Batavorum, Procolita
- Tribune cohortis primae Aeliae Classicae, Tunnocelo
- Tribune cohortis primae Tungrorum Classicae, Vercovicium
- Tribune cohortis primae Morinorum, Glannoventa
- Tribune cohortis quaternary Gallorum, Vindolanda
- Tribune cohortis tertiae Nerviorum, Alione (Alauna?)
- Tribune cohortis primae Asturum, Aesica
- Cuneus Sarmatarum, Bremetenraco (Bremenium?)(no officer stated)
- Cohortis secundae Dalmatarum, Magnis
- Tribune Alae primae Herculeae, Olenaco
- Praefectus cohortis primae Aeliae Dacorum, Camboglanna or Banna
- Tribune cohortis sextae Nerviorum, Virosido

and an unknown unit in the fort Luguvalium

The Dux Britanniarum held command over thirty-eight regimental commanders. Infantry units were concentrated along the Wall. A Sarmatian unit of heavy cavalry (Cuneus Sarmatarum), was stationed near the crossroads at Ribchester. As their name suggests the Praefectus Numeri exploratorum were used for reconnaissance. The Equites Crispianorum was located at Doncaster, and a naval unit at the mouth of the Tyne. Collins estimates troop counts from a low of 7,000 to as much as 15,000, with the average approximating 12,500.

== Origin ==
The Legio sexta is an ancient tribal legion of Britain, the Legio VI Eburacum (York). They seem to have had in late antiquity no fixed posting. One might expect that this legion (full name: Legio VI Victrix Pia Fidelis Britannica) at this time still to be stationed in Eburacum: this absence may indicate that the unit had been moved to another site when the list of the Dux Britanniarum was compiled in the Notita Dignitatum. ("Possibly is the VI."?) but also in connection with the non-historically tangible primani iuniores in the army of the Comes Britanniarum.

The men under the Praefectus Numbers Solensium could (per Arnold Hughes Martin Jones, 1986) be the descendants of another British unit, the Legio XX Valeria Victrix. This is the only legion no longer listed in the Notitia Dignitatum. The last epigraphic evidence of their presence in Britain is a mention on coins of the usurper Carausius, a century before the Notita Dignitatum was compiled.

== See also ==
- Fullofaudes
- Dulcitius

== Sources ==
- Alexander Demandt: Geschichte der Spätantike: Das Römische Reich von Diocletian bis Justinian 284-565 n. Chr. München 1998, ISBN 3-406-57241-3 (Beck Historische Bibliothek).
- Nick Fields: Rome's Saxon Shore Coastal Defences of Roman Britain AD 250–500. Osprey Books, 2006, ISBN 978-1-84603-094-9 (Fortress 56).
- Arnold Hugh Martin Jones: The Later Roman Empire, 284–602. A Social, Economic and Administrative Survey. 2 Bde. Johns Hopkins University Press, Baltimore 1986, ISBN 0-8018-3285-3.
- Simon MacDowall: Late Roman Infantryman, 236-565 AD. Weapons, Armour, Tactics. Osprey Books, 1994, ISBN 1-85532-419-9 (Warrior 9).
- Ralf Scharf: Der Dux Mogontiacensis und die Notitia Dignitatum. de Gruyter, Berlin 2005, ISBN 3-11-018835-X.
- Fran & Geoff Doel, Terry Lloyd: König Artus und seine Welt, Aus dem Englischen von Christof Köhler. Sutton, Erfurt 2000, ISBN 3-89702-191-9.
- Guy de la Bedoyere: Hadrians Wall, History and Guide. Tempus, Stroud 1998, ISBN 0-7524-1407-0.
