= Theodosius the Elder =

Roman army officer and father of emperor Theodosius I

- Died: 376; Carthage, Africa
- Spouse: Thermantia
- Issue: Theodosius I Honorius; Unnamed daughter
- Dynasty: Theodosian

Count Theodosius (Latin: Theodosius comes; died 376), Flavius Theodosius or Theodosius the Elder (Latin: Theodosius major), (Note: Sometimes called Flavius Theodosius. The name "Flavius" had become a status marker for men of non-senatorial background who rose to eminence as a result of imperial service.) was a senior military officer serving Valentinian I (r. 364–375) and the Western Roman Empire during Late Antiquity. Under his command the Roman army defeated numerous threats, incursions, and usurpations. Theodosius was patriarch of the imperial Theodosian dynasty (r. 379–457) and father of the emperor Theodosius the Great (r. 379–395).

Appointed comes rei militaris per Britannias (commander of mobile military forces for the Diocese of the Britains) by Valentinian, Theodosius put down the Great Conspiracy (367–368) and the usurpation of Valentinus. After restoring order in Britain he returned to continental Europe and fought against the Alemanni; as Valentinian's magister equitum (Master of Horse) he successfully invaded Alemannic territory (371 or 370). In 372 Theodosius led a successful campaign against the Sarmatians. Within the same year Firmus, a Mauritanian prince, rebelled against Roman rule with the help of African tribes like the Abanni and Caprarienses. Theodosius was sent to Africa and in two hard-fought campaigns (373–374) put down the insurrection. In 376, after the death of emperor Valentinian, he was arrested and executed, presumably as he was seen as a threat to the new western emperors Gratian and Valentinian II.

Theodosius's title in Latin was comes rei militaris (viz. "companion [of the emperor] for military affairs"; the word comes is the origin of the medieval European feudal title of count and its homologues.

== Military career ==
Theodosius is first mentioned in historical records by Ammianus Marcellinus with reference to his appointment to the command to restore order in Britain. According to Hughes,

It is clear that prior to his appointment to such an important military enterprise Theodosius must have been well known to Valentinian and that his military ability was respected, but unfortunately how he had earned such respect is unknown.

Other scholars agree with the supposition that Theodosius won the trust of Valentinian I in his earlier career.

=== The Great Conspiracy ===
In 368, Theodosius was raised to the high Roman military rank of comes rei militaris and sent to northern Gaul and Britannia to recover the lands lost to the Great Barbarian Conspiracy in the previous year. Theodosius was given command of part of Valentinian's comitatensis (the Imperial Field Army) and early in the year he marched on Bononia (Boulogne-sur-Mer), Rome's harbour on the Channel. Taking advantage of a break in the weather, Theodosius crossed the Channel, leaving the bulk of his troops in Bononia to await clearer weather. He landed at Rutupiae (Richborough), and started gathering intelligence on the situation in Britain; he found out that the troops in Britain had either refused to fight against an enemy superior in numbers, or had been on furlough when the invasion began. Furthermore, he found out that the enemy had broken up their forces into small raiding parties which were plundering at will. When his army finally crossed the Channel with the onset of favorable spring weather, Theodosius had made his plans and was ready to move. The Roman army marched on Londinium (London) and re-established Imperial control of Britain's largest city. Using Londinium as his base of operations, Theodosius divided his army into detachments and sent them to attack bands of marauders within reach of the city. The Romans quickly killed or captured many of the small enemy raiding parties, relieving them of their booty, supplies and prisoners. Theodosius also sent messengers offering pardon to deserters and ordering them to make their way to Londinium.

Over the winter of 368–369, large numbers of troops drifted back into their units, bringing vital intelligence that would help Theodosius plan the next phase of his campaign. In 369 Theodosius campaigned all through Roman Britain, restoring its 'chief towns' and hunting down enemy war parties and traitors. Ammianus Marcellinus records that he put down a rebellion by the Pannonian Valentinus. At the end of the campaigning season he sent a message to Valentinian to inform him that the provinces of Britain had been restored to the Empire. He also informed the emperor that he had created a new province which he had named Valentia (probably for Valentinian).

Known to have been with him on this expedition were his son Theodosius, and the future emperor Magnus Maximus, possibly a relative.

=== Magister Equitum Praesentalis ===
On his return from Britain Theodosius succeeded Jovinus as the magister equitum praesentalis at the court of the Emperor Valentinian I, in which capacity he prosecuted another successful campaign (370/371) against the Alemanni. In 372 Theodosius was deployed to Illyricum and led an army against the Sarmatians; he appears to have secured a victory in battle and successfully brought the campaign to an end.

In the same year, Firmus, a Mauretanian prince, rebelled against Roman rule and plunged the Diocese of Africa into disarray. Valentinian decided to give Theodosius the command of the expedition to suppress the rebellion. Theodosius' son was made dux of the province of Moesia Prima, replacing his father as commander in Illyricum, while Theodosius himself started mustering his troops at Arles. In the spring of 373 Theodosius sailed to Africa and led a successful campaign against the rebels in the east of Mauritania. At the end of the campaigning season, when he led his army into western Mauritania, he suffered a major setback. In 374 Theodosius invaded western Mauritania again. This time he was more successful, defeating the rebels and capturing Firmus.

In 375, when the Emperor Valentinian suddenly died, Theodosius was still in Africa. Orders arrived for Theodosius to be arrested; he was taken to Carthage, and put to death in early 376. The reasons for this are not clear, but it is thought to have resulted from a factional power struggle in Italy after the sudden death of Emperor Valentinian in November 375. (Note: Theodosius’ fall is usually attributed to the praetorian prefect Maximinus, who was explicitly blamed in a glossator for Jerome. After Maximinus and his associates were removed from power, they were replaced with Theodosius’ relatives. Hebblewhite and McEvoy instead blamed the general Merobaudes, believing he had motive, while Rodgers considered him to be innocent based on the lack of evidence suggesting his involvement.) Shortly before his death, which he accepted calmly, Theodosius received Christian baptism — delaying the rite until the end of one's life was common practice at the time, even for lifelong Christians.

== Legacy ==
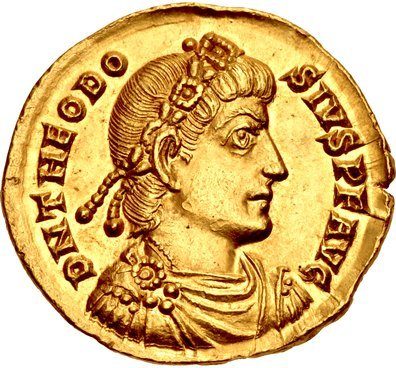
Solidus of Theodosius I

At the fall of his father, the younger Theodosius retired to his estates in the Iberian Peninsula, where he married Aelia Flaccilla in 376. According to Ambrose, those who had killed the elder Theodosius had also plotted against the safety of his son during his retirement. The younger Theodosius had returned to the Danube frontier by 378 when he was appointed magister equitum. Following his successes in the field he was elevated at Sirmium (Sremska Mitrovica) to the rank of augustus by the emperor Gratian (r. 367–383) on 19 January 379.

After the accession of his son, Theodosius the Elder was deified and given the consecratio in Latin: Divus Theodosius Pater, lit. 'the Divine Father Theodosius', and statues of him were set up.

Theodosius I joined himself with the ruling Valentinianic dynasty (r. 364–455) by wedding Galla, daughter of Valentinian the Great and his second wife Justina, and sister of Theodosius's co-augustus Gratian. He went on to establish an imperial dynasty of his own, making Count Theodosius the progenitor and patriarch of a line of Roman emperors and empresses.

== See also ==
- Roman Britain

== Sources ==
- Curran, John (1998). "From Jovian to Theodosius". In Averil Cameron & Peter Garnsey (eds.). The Cambridge Ancient History XIII: The Late Empire, A.D. 337–425. Cambridge University Press. ISBN 0-521-30200-5.
- Hebblewhite, Mark (2020). Theodosius and the Limits of Empire. London: Routledge. doi:10.4324/9781315103334. ISBN 978-1-138-10298-9. S2CID 213344890.
- Hughes, Ian (5 August 2013). Imperial Brothers: Valentinian, Valens and the Disaster at Adrianople. Pen and Sword. ISBN 978-1-4738-2863-6.
- Jones, A.H.M.; J.R. Martindale & J. Morris (1971). Prosopography of the Later Roman Empire. Vol. 1. Cambridge University Press. ISBN 0-521-07233-6.
- Kelly, Gavin (2013). "The Political Crisis of AD 375–376" (PDF). Chiron. 43: 357–409. Archived from the original (PDF) on 2021-06-20.
- McEvoy, Meaghan (2013). Child Emperor Rule in the Late Roman West, AD 367–455. Oxford University Press. ISBN 978-0199664818.
- Potter, David S. (2004). The Roman Empire at Bay: AD 180–395. New York: Routledge. ISBN 0-415-10057-7.
- Rodgers, Barbara Saylor (1981). "Merobaudes and Maximus in Gaul". Historia. 30 (1): 82–105. JSTOR 4435744.
- Treadgold, Warren (2005-01-01). "Predicting the Accession of Theodosius I". Mediterraneo Antico.
- Williams, Stephen; Friell, Gerard (1994). Theodosius: The Empire at Bay. Yale University Press. ISBN 978-0-300-07447-5.
