= Valentinian dynasty =

Roman imperial dynasty in late antiquity, r. 364–392 and 421–455

Valentinian dynasty Dynasty of the Roman Empire
- 364–455 (Note: No Valentinian ruler in 392–421, and 421–425.)
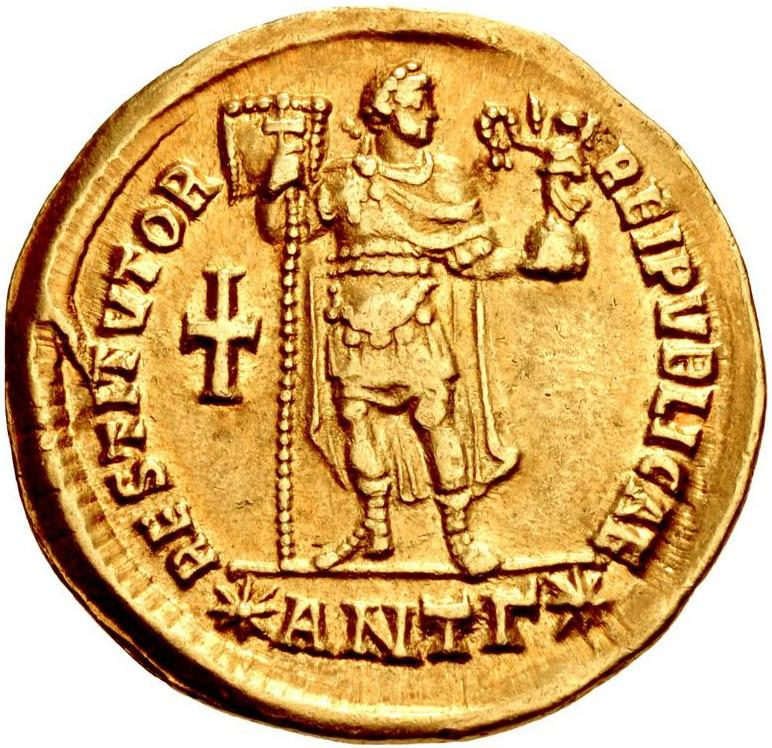
- Solidus of Valens (Note: Showing Valentinian and Valens on the reverse, marked victoria augg· ("the Victory of Our Augusti"). They hold together the orb, a symbol of power)

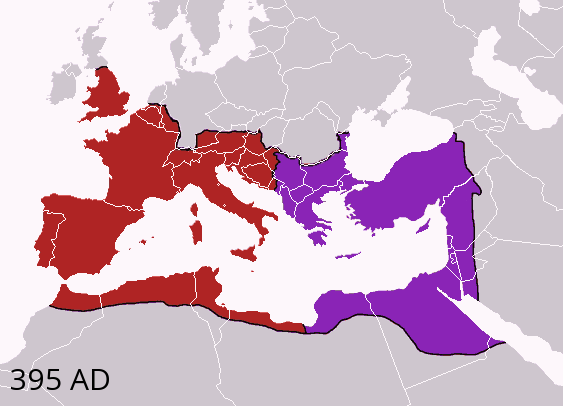
- Western and Eastern Roman Empires 395
- Status: Imperial dynasty
- Capital: Roma; Constantinopolis; Ravenna
- Government: Absolute monarchy
- Western Roman emperors
  - 364–375: Valentinian I
  - 375–383: Gratian
  - 388–392: Valentinian II
  - 392–421/421–425: Interregnum
  - 421: Constantius III
  - 425–455: Valentinian III
- Eastern Roman emperors
  - 364: Valentinian I
  - 364–378: Valens
- Historical era: Late antiquity
  - Ascent of Valentinian I, Division of Empire: 364
  - Battle of Adrianople, Death of Valens: 9 August 378
  - Death of Valentinian II: 392
  - Death of Valentinian III: 455 (Note: No Valentinian ruler in 392–421, and 421–425.)
Preceded by
Constantinian dynasty (306–363)
Jovian (363–364)
Succeeded by
Petronius Maximus and Licinia Eudoxia (455)
Olybrius and Placidia (472) and non-dynastic "shadow" emperors, to Fall of the Western Roman Empire (480)
Theodosian dynasty (379–457)
Leonid dynasty (457–518)
Byzantine Empire (Note: The retrospective periodization of late antiquity and of the Eastern Roman empire and the Byzantine Empire does not have consensus, with estimates varying from the fifth to seventh centuries for the beginning of the latter period)

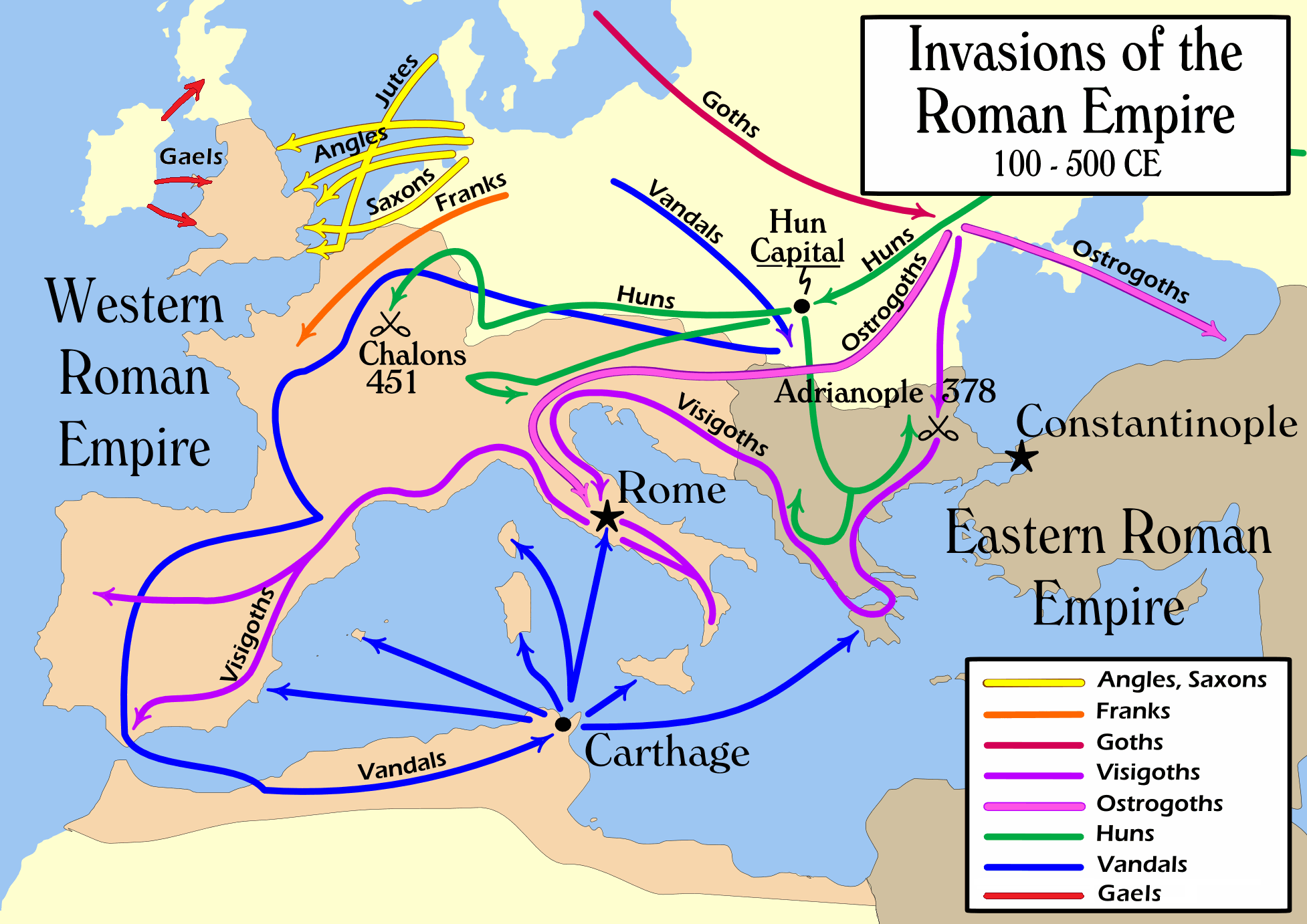
Roman Empire 100–500, with invading tribes and the Battle of Adrianople

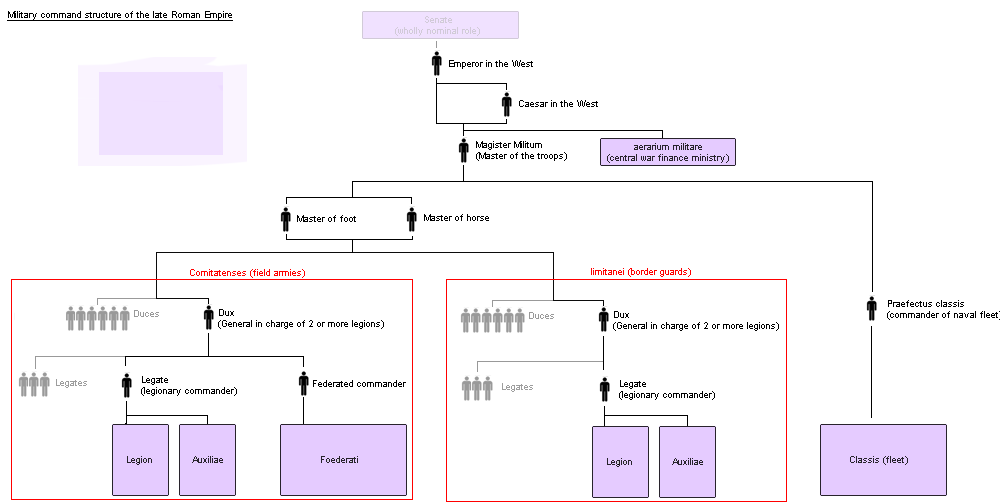
Command structure of Late Roman army

High command structure of the West Roman army c. 410–425

The Valentinian dynasty, commonly known as the Valentinianic dynasty, was a ruling house of five generations of dynasts, including five Roman emperors during late antiquity, lasting nearly a hundred years from the mid fourth to the mid fifth century. They succeeded the Constantinian dynasty (r. 306–363) and reigned over the Roman Empire from 364 to 392 and from 425 to 455, with an interregnum (392–425), during which the Theodosian dynasty ruled and eventually succeeded them. The Theodosians, who intermarried into the Valentinian house, ruled concurrently in the east after 379.

The Valentinian dynasty's patriarch was Gratianus Funarius, whose sons Valentinian I and Valens were both made Roman emperors in 364. Valentinian I's two sons, Gratian and Valentinian II both became emperors. Valentinian I's daughter Galla married Theodosius the Great, the emperor of the Eastern empire, who with his descendants formed the Theodosian dynasty (r. 379–457). In turn, their daughter, Galla Placidia married a later emperor, Constantius III (r. 421–421). Their son, Valentinian III (r. 425–455), who ruled in the west, was the last emperor of the dynasty, whose death marked the end of dynasties in the western empire. During the interregnum, Theodosius' son Honorius ruled in the west, and concurrently with Constantius III in 421. The dynasty has been labelled as Pannonian, based on the family origin in Pannonia Secunda in the western Balkans.

Under the Valentinians, dynastic rule was consolidated and the division of the empire into west and east became increasingly entrenched. The empire was subject to repeated incursions along its borders, with the Danube frontier eventually collapsing in the northeast and barbarian invasions in the west eventually reaching Italy, and culminating with the sack of Rome in 410 during the Theodosian interregnum, which foreshadowed the eventual dissolution of the western empire in the late fifth century.

== Background ==
The Valentinian dynasty (364–455) was a ruling house during the Late Roman Empire (284–476), in Late antiquity (adj. 'late antique'), including the turbulent years of the late fourth century, and the last dynasty of the western empire. The death of Julian (r. 361–363) ended the Constantinian dynasty. The following thirty years to the death of Valentinian II (r. 383–392) form the first Valentinian dynasty, one of the most critical periods in the late Roman Empire, structuring the empire in ways that would have long lasting consequences. The succeeding thirty years (395–425) from the death of Theodosius I to the death of his sons and ascent of Valentinian III (r. 425–455) saw the foundations of the Byzantine Empire in the east and the replacement of the western Roman empire with European kingdoms together with a series of events that led to the emergence of the mediaeval Islamic states. The period of the preceding Constantinian age (293–363) reaffirmed the importance of dynasty in legitimacy and succession. This new dynastic structure would last until 454. The house of Valentinian (the Valentiniani) established continuity and succession from the Constantinians through marriages to a granddaughter and grand-niece of Constantine. This granddaughter, Constantia (362–383), the only surviving child of Constantius II (r. 337–361), played an important role as a symbol of her dynasty for decades. The Constantinian legacy being described as the "indelible glow of empire". While imperial heirs were relatively rare in this period, the marriages of imperial women raised special concerns, as possibly leading to the raising of pretenders to the throne. A number of them, such as Gratian's half-sisters, took a vow to become dedicated virgins (Latin: sanctae necessitudines, lit. 'holy relatives'). Yet it was also an era in which women, either as empresses or as emperor consorts, rose to unprecedented power. Another feature of this dynasty was the successive appointment of child emperors, radically changing the traditional image of emperors as men of deeds. With Valentinian's division of the empire (Latin: divisio regni) in a new way, in 364, the two parts of the empire (Latin: partes imperii), east and west would progressively develop their own histories, until the split became permanent on the death of Theodosius I (r. 379–395).

The Roman Empire had controlled all lands surrounding the Mediterranean, a "Roman lake" surrounded by foreign lands (Latin: barbaricum, lit. 'barbarian lands'), since the second century, with little loss of territory. These lands stretched from, in the northeast, Hadrian's Wall in the north of England, to the river Euphrates in Mesopotamia in the middle east. The main regions (Latin: regiones) of the empire, from west to east, were Hispania (Spain), Gallia (Gaul, now France), Britannia (Britain), Italia (Italy), in the Balkans Illyrium and Thracia, Asia (Asiana, Asia minor), and Oriens (Middle east). While on the southern Mediterranean shore lay Africa in the west and Aegyptus (Egypt) in the east. However, it faced a number of challenges on its frontiers, including the Sasanian Persians to the east, while to the north, what had been small fragmented incursions of Barbarians was becoming mass migrations of peoples such as the Franks on the lower Rhine, the Alamanni in the former Agri Decumates lands between the Rhine and Danube and the Goths on the lower Danube. This period was one in which the Roman Empire, already divided on an east–west axis, became consolidated as two empires, following the death of Theodosius I. Although both partes continued to cooperate and preserved the constitutional myth of a single jurisdictional unit, and that an emperor rules everywhere, no western emperor would ever rule in the east again, or (apart two brief visits by Theodosius) eastern emperor in the west. The dynasty was relatively short lived in the east, being replaced by the house of Theodosius following the death of the first eastern emperor, Valens, in 378. In the west, following an interlude during which Honorius (r. 393–423), a Theodosian, reigned, Valentinian III continued the dynasty until his death in 455. During this period, the empire struggled against both external migratory tribes and internal pretenders and usurpers, with frequent civil war. By the end of the dynasty, the western empire was crumbling and Rome had been sacked. The Valentinian dynasty also saw the reintroduction of Christianity after a brief period during which the emperor Julian attempted to reimpose traditional Roman religions, but tolerance and religious freedom persisted for some time in the west. The dynasty not only saw a struggle between paganism and Christianity, but between two major factions within Christianity, the Nicenes and the homoians.

Julian had died in 363 during an ill-fated expedition against the Sasanian Persian capital Ctesiphon. His successor, Jovian was faced with little alternative than to accept the terms laid down by Sapor (Shapur), the Sasanian king, ceding a number of provinces and cities to the Persians. The terms of the peace treaty also forbad the Romans from involvement in Armenian affairs to assist Arsaces (Arshak), the Armenian king who had been Julian's ally during the war. This peace was to last thirty years

=== Administration ===
==== Military administration ====
The major divisions of the late Roman army included a central force (comitatenses), ready for deployment, and the forces stationed in the provinces and on the frontier (ripenses, later limitanei, lit. 'on the river banks, or frontiers') under the command of a dux (lit. 'leader', pl. duces), e.g. dux Armeniae. Of these the comitatenses had the higher status and was also called praesental (Latin: praesentalis, lit. 'presence'), i.e. in the presence of the emperor. The third division was the imperial bodyguard (Latin: scholae palatinae, lit. 'Palace Corps'), answering directly to the emperor, but under the magister officiorum (master of the officers). These scholae (or scolae, sing. schola or scola) were cavalry units, whose names originally derived from their equipment. The scholae scutariorum (or scutarii, lit. 'shield bearers') refer to their shields (Latin: scuta, sing. scutum). This was the unit from which Valentinian I, the first of the Valentinian emperors, was drawn. In the armies stationed in Thracia and Illyricum the local commander had the title of comes rei militaris (lit. 'count for military affairs'), a rank between dux and magister. The organisational structure is outlined in the contemporary document, the notitia dignitatum (lit. list of the offices), a list of all the administrative positions. (Note: Full title: notitia omnium dignitatum et administrationum tam civilium quam militarium (information of all ranks of both civil and military administrations)) It became common to append the honorific comes to magistri positions. The Notitia lists six comites, including comes Africae (or comes per Africam) and comes Britanniarum, responsible for the defence of Africa and Britain respectively. Other military comites include the comes et magister utriusque militiae (or comes et magister utriusque militiae praesentalis) and comites domesticorum (comes domesticorum equitum, comes domesticorum peditum).

Originally there was a separate command for the infantry under the Master of Foot (Latin: magister peditum) and cavalry under the Master of Horse (Latin: magister equitum), with command in the praesental army specified as e.g. magister peditum praesentalis. Later these posts came under a single command, the Master of the Soldiers (Latin: magister militum) As the army became increasingly dependent on recruiting forces from neighbouring peoples, predominantly German ("barbarization"), these units were referred to as federate units (Latin: foederati).

Within the Emperor's palace, a military corps (schola), the protectorum composed of the protectores domestici (often simply domestici, sing. protector domesticus; lit. 'protectors of the household'), under the command of the comes domesticorum. This commander or general was equivalent to the magister officiorum in the civilian branch, but below the magistri militum (field marshals). Protectores (sing. protector) could also be assigned to the magistri or provincial commands. The title protector could also be used as an honorific. (Note: Eventually protector and domesticus became interchangeable)

==== Civilian administration ====
Rome in Italy, as the empire's nominative capital, had become increasingly irrelevant, the seat of power being where the emperor was at any one time, which military considerations meant was frequently the frontiers, and emperors visited the city infrequently. During the late third century, a number of new imperial cities were established, Mediolanum (Milan) in northern Italy and Nikomedia in Turkey as the principal residences, while lesser status was awarded to Arelate (Arles) in Gaul (now France), Augusta Treverorum or Treveri (Trier) in Germany (then part of Gaul), Serdica (Sofia) in the Balkans, and Antioch (Antakya) in Syria, while Rome remained the home of the Senate and aristocracy.

The founding of Constantinople ("New Rome") in 324 had progressively shifted the administrative axis eastwards, while Mediolanum and Aquileia, on the eastern edge of Italy became more important politically. While the eastern empire was centred on Constantinople, the western empire was never ruled from the historic capital of Rome, but from Trevorum, then Mediolanum in 381 and Vienne, Gaul. Finally Honorius (r. 393–423), besieged by Visigoths in Mediolanum in 402 transferred to Ravenna, the capital of Flaminia et Picenum Annonarium on the north east coast of Italy. The seat of Government returned to Rome in 440 under Valentinian III. Other imperial residences included the Balkan centres of Sirmium and Thessalonica. With the division of the empire, power became concentrated in two principal cities. Local government was three tiered with provinces grouped into dioceses governed by vicarrii, and finally into the three geographically defined praetorian prefectures (Latin: praefecturae praetoriis, singular praefectura praetorio). The division by Valentinian and his brother contained one anomaly, with the Balkan Peninsula being initially in the west. The east consisted of a single prefecture, the praefectura praetorio Orientis, while in the west, there was the praefectura praetorio Galliarum (Britain, Gaul, Spain) and the central praefectura praetorio Italiae, Illyrici et Africae

Officials (officiales, sing. officialis) at the comitatus (imperial court) and bureaucracy included two major groups (Latin: scholae, sing. schola) with similar functions who acted between the court and the provinces (Latin: provinciae, sing. provincia). Court officials were known as palatini (sing. palatinus). Members of the scholae were scholarares sing. scholaris. The schola notariorum were the notaries (Latin: notarii, sing. notarius), who were clerks that formed the imperial secretariat and who drafted and authenticated documents. Principal among these were the senior secretaries (Latin: primicerii notariorum, lit. 'the first [name] on the wax [tablet] among the notaries', sing. primicerius). The notarii carried out a wide range of imperial missions, including being informants. The other was the schola agentum in rebus. These were the agentes in rebus, or agents of business, answerable to the magister officiorum (Master of the Officers), (Note: Hence, alternative name magistriani) who was the head of the palatine administration or Imperial Chancellor, and drew his staff from within their ranks. They could also hold appointments within the central clerical bureaux (sacra scrinia, lit. sacred book chests). The magister officiorum was also responsible for the organisation of the schola notariorum. The primicerius of the schola maintained the notitia dignitatum, and like the magister drew from the ranks of his schola, who could also hold positions in the scrinia.

Three such scrinia were found at the Imperial court, the scrinium memoriae (Ministry of Requests), scrinium epistularum (Ministry of Correspondence) and scrinium libellorum (Ministry of Petitions), each under a bureau director (Latin: magister scrinii), and these magistri scriniorum reported in turn to the magister officiorum.

The palatini included both civilian and military personnel

=== Titles ===
Diocletian (r. 284–305) had established a hierarchical system of imperial rule, with two tiers of emperors (Latin: imperatores, sing. imperator), with senior emperors, or augusti (sing. augustus), and junior emperors, or caesares (sing. caesar). In this system, the plan was for junior emperors, who established their courts in the minor imperial cities to assist and eventually inherit authority. Periodically, emperors would be awarded victory titles (or names) to commemorate political or military events. A common title was maximus, e.g. Germanicus maximus. The suffix Latin: maximus, lit. 'greatest' indicates victor, with the prefix, the vanquished, in this case Germania (see List of Roman imperial victory titles).

During the Republic, the title consul (pl. consules), was bestowed on two of the worthiest of men, who had to be at least 42 years old. These were annual appointments and they served as the highest executive officers and also as generals in the army. By the late Roman empire, the title of consul was becoming more honorific, and the emperors were increasingly likely to take the title for themselves, rather than bestow it on distinguished citizens. In appointing his infant son as consul, Theodosius changed the nature of the appointment to that of a family prerogative. Traditionally, years were dated by the consulships (consular dating), since consuls took up their position on January 1 (from 153 BC).

Comites (sing. comes, lit. 'companion'), often translated as count, were high-ranking officials or ministers who enjoyed the trust and companionship of the emperor, and collectively were referred to as comitiva, the governing council of the empire, from which the term comitatus for the imperial court is derived. The title comes could be purely honorific without indicating a specific function, or integral to a descriptive title, as in the military roles.

== History ==
A.D. 364 was a time of great uncertainty on the late Roman Empire. Julian (r. 361–363), the last Constantinian emperor (Latin: augustus, the official title given to emperors) had died after a very brief reign, in his Persian War of that year, and the Roman army had elected Jovian (r. 363–364), one of his officers, to replace him. Jovian himself died within less than a year, at Dadastana, Turkey, while his army was on the way from Antioch, the capital of Roman Syria, to Constantinople. Jovian was found dead in his quarters on 17 February 364, under circumstances some considered suspicious.

The fourth century historian Ammianus Marcellinus, recounts that once Jovian's body was embalmed and dispatched to Constantinople, the legions continued on to Nicaea in Turkey, where military and civilian staff sought a new emperor. Among several put forward, was that of Flavius Valentinianus (Valentinian), recently promoted to the command of the second division of the scutarii, and this choice received unanimous support. At the time, Valentinian was stationed some distance away at Ancyra (Ankara), and was summoned, arriving in Nicaea on 25 February 364. Valentinian (321–375), called Valentinian the Great, was acclaimed augustus by the general staff of the army. The Consularia Constantinopolitana (Note: One of the Fasti, or chronological accounts of Roman consuls) and the Chronicon Paschale give the date of his elevation as 25/6 February.

To avoid the instability caused by the deaths of his two predecessors, and rivalry between the armies, Valentinian (r. 364–375) acceded to the demands of his soldiers and ruled the western provinces while elevating his younger and relatively inexperienced brother Valens (b. 328,r. 364–378) as co-augustus to rule over the eastern provinces. The two brothers divided the empire along roughly linguistic grounds, Latin in the west and Greek in the east, and proceeded to also divide the administrative and military structures, so that recruitment became increasingly regionalised, with little exchange. Valens was appointed Tribune of the Stables (Latin: tribunus stabulorum or stabuli) on 1 March 364, and the Consularia Constantinopolitana dates his elevation to co-augustus on 28 March 364, at Constantinople. Both brothers became Roman consuls for the first time, Valentinian at Mediolanum (Milan) and Valens at Constantinople. This was the first time that the two parts of the empire were completely separated. The exception was the appointment of consuls, in which Valentinian retained precedence. Valentinian made the seat of his government Trier, and never visited Rome, while Valens divided his time between Antioch and Constantinople. Valens's wife Domnica may have also become augusta in 364.

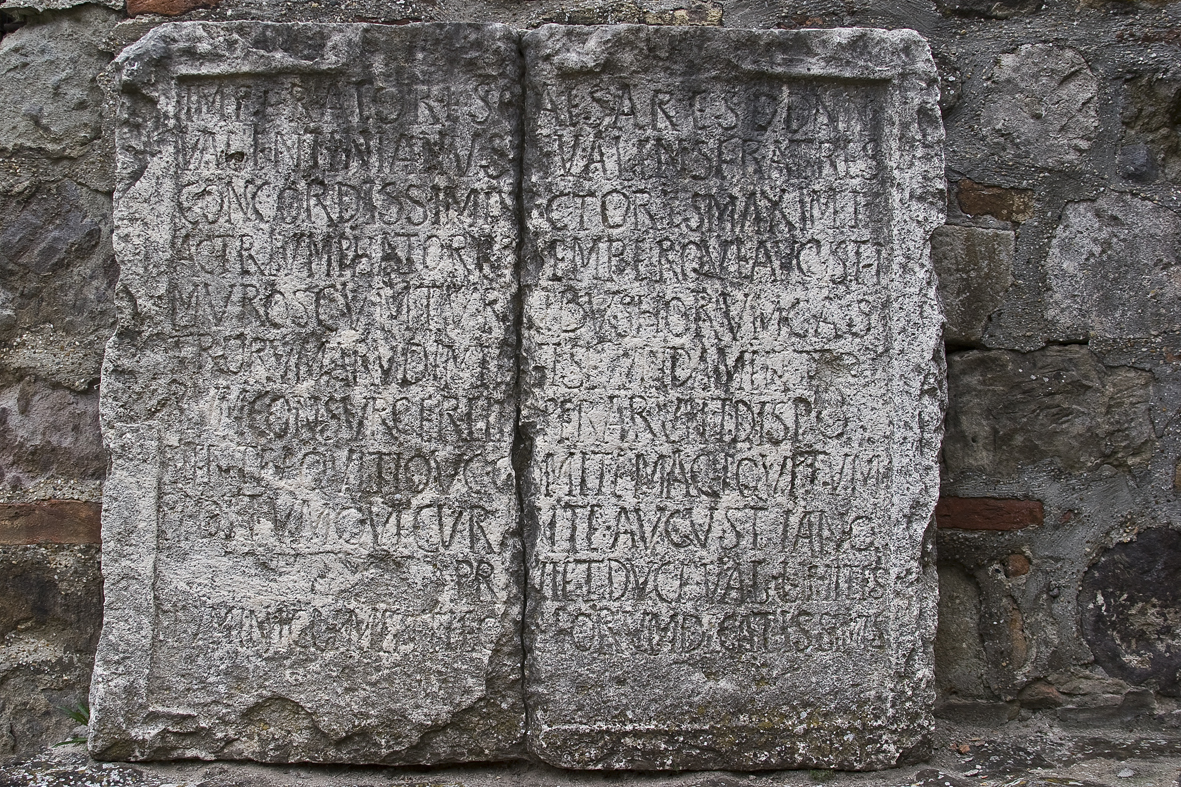
Inscription to Valentinian I and Valens from Esztergom on the Danube (Note: The inscription reads: Imperatores Caesares dd nn Valentinianus [e]t Valens fratres concordissimi victores maximi ac triumphatores [s]emperque Augusti... "the Imperatores Caesar, Our Lords Valentinian and Valens, most concord brothers, greatest victors and triumphatores, and eternal Augusti …")

=== First generation: Valentinian I and Valens (364–378) ===
Valentinian and Valens received many titles during their reigns, other than the customary emperor and augustus. Both were awarded the victory name of Germanicus maximus, Alamannicus maximus, and Francicus maximus to indicate victories against Germania, Alamanni and Franks, in 368, the year of their second consulship. In 369 Valens received the victory name Gothicus Maximus and celebrated his quinquennalia. Valentinian also celebrated his quinquennalia on 25 February 369 and likewise received the honour of Gothicus Maximus.

Valentinian and Valens were consuls for the third time in 370. 373 was the year of Valentinian and Valens's fourth and last joint consulship. In 373/374, Theodosius the magister equitum's son, was made dux of the province of Moesia Prima. Valens celebrated his decennalia on 29 March 374. At the fall of his father, the magister equitum, the younger Theodosius, dux of Moesia Prima, retired to his estates in the Iberian Peninsula, where he married his first wife, Aelia Flaccilla in 376. Gratian's fourth consulship was in 377. Valens's sixth consulship was in 378, again jointly with Valentinian II.

==== Founding of the Valentiniani ====
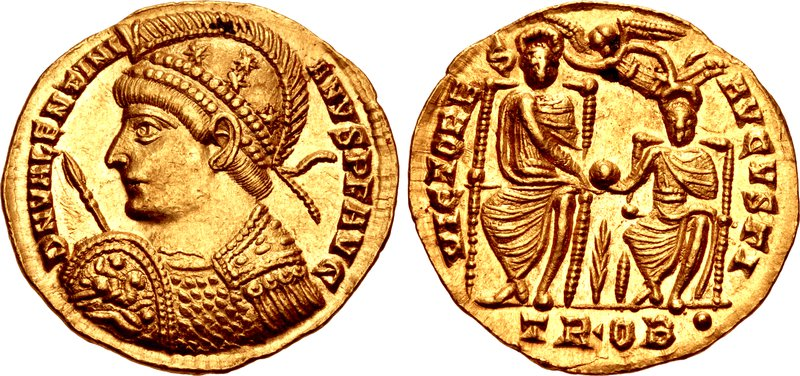
Solidus of Valentinian I showing Valentinian and Gratian on the reverse, marked: victores augusti ("the Victors Augusti"). A palm bough is between them and Victory crowns each with a wreath

Gratianus Funarius, the patriarch of the dynasty, was from Cibalae (Vinkovci) in the Roman province of Pannonia Secunda, lying along the Sava river in the northern Balkans. He had become a senior officer in the Roman army and comes Africae. His son Valentinian, born 321, also came from Cibalae and joined the protectores, rising to tribunus in 357. Valentinian served in Gaul and in Mesopotamia in the reign of Constantius II (r. 337–361). Valentinian's younger brother Valens was also born at Cibalae, in 328, and followed a military career. According to the Chronicle of Jerome and the Chronicon Paschale, Valentinian's eldest son Gratian was born in 359 at Sirmium, now Sremska Mitrovica in Serbia, the capital of Pannonia Secunda, to Valentinian's first wife Marina Severa. Gratian was appointed consul in 366 and was entitled nobilissimus puer. (Note: Most noble child) According to the Consularia Constantinopolitana, Valens's son Valentinianus Galates was born on 18 January 366, and made a consul in 369, and is known to have been titled nobilissimus puer, but died in infancy at Caesarea in Cappadocia (Kayseri) around 370.

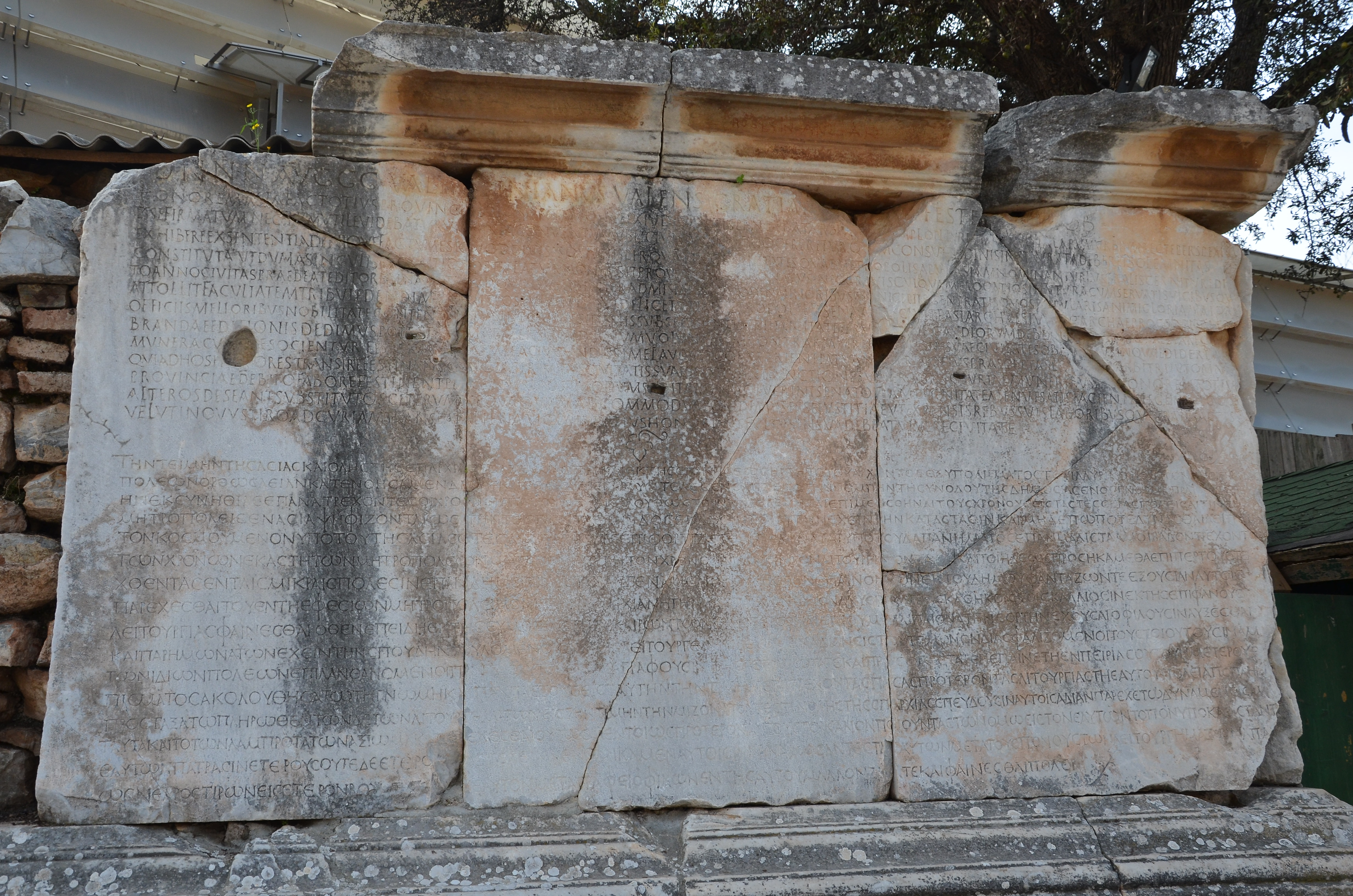
Bilingual inscription mentioning Valentinian, Valens and Gratian, 372–378, Ephesus (AE 1906, 00030b)

In the summer of 367, Valentinian became ill, while at Civitas Ambianensium (Amiens), raising questions about his succession. On recovery, he presented his then eight-year-old son to his troops on 27 August, as co-augustus (r. 367–383), passing over the customary initial step of caesar. Gratian's tutor was the rhetor Ausonius, who mentioned the relationship in his epigrams and a poem. Around 370, Valentinian's wife Marina Severa died and was interred in the Church of the Holy Apostles and Valentinian married again, wedding Justina. In autumn 371, Valentinian's second son, also called Valentinian, was born to Justina, possibly at Augusta Treverorum (Trier). The younger Valentinian would later succeed his father, as Valentinian II (r. 375–392). Gratian, who was then 15, was married in 374 to Constantius II's 13-year-old daughter Constantia at Trier. This marriage consolidated the dynastic link to Constantinians, as had his father's second marriage to Justina, with her family connections.

Because of their family origins in the Roman province of Pannonia Secunda in the northern Balkans, the Hungarian historian Andreas Alföldi dubbed the dynasty the "Pannonian emperors". On the 9 April 370, according to the Consularia Constantinopolitana and the Chronicon Paschale, the Church of the Holy Apostles adjoining the Mausoleum of Constantine in Constantinople was inaugurated. In 375, the Baths of Carosa (Latin: Thermae Carosianae) – named for Valens's daughter – were inaugurated in Constantinople.

==== Domestic policy ====
Beginning between 365 and 368, Valentinian and Valens reformed the precious metal coins of the Roman currency, decreeing that all bullion be melted down in the central imperial treasury before minting. Such coins were inscribed ob (gold) and ps (silver). Valentinian improved tax collection and was frugal in spending.

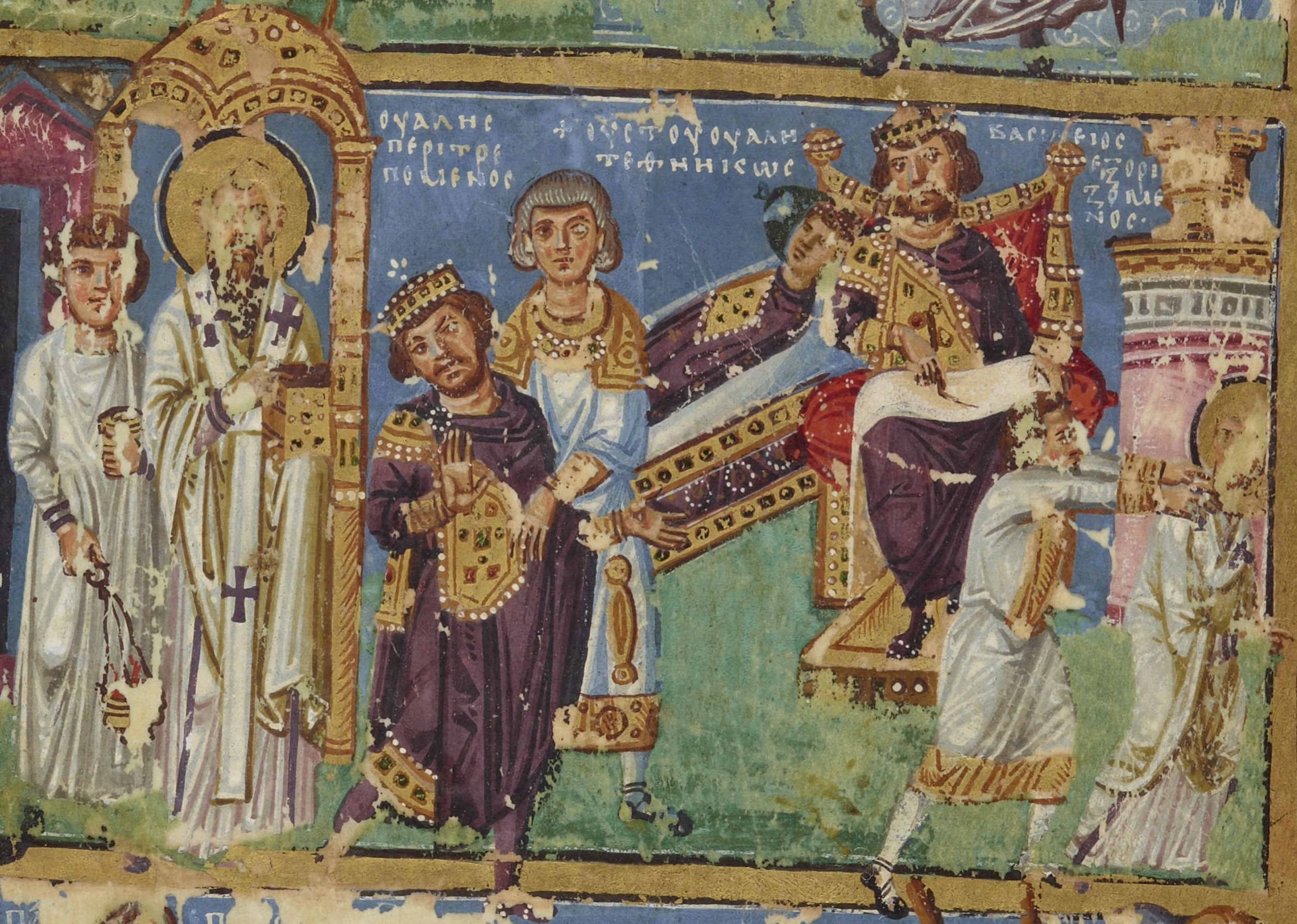
Death of Valentinianus Galates from the 9th-century Paris Gregory (Bibliothèque nationale de France)

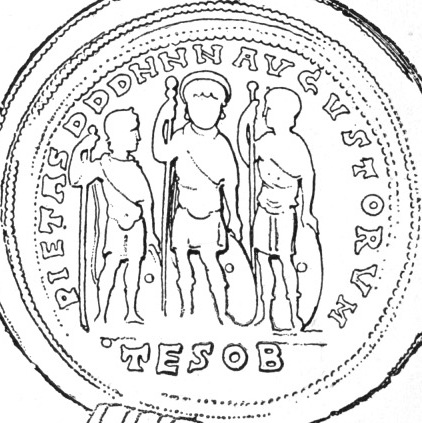
Detail of drawing of obverse of medal of Valens showing the three reigning emperors: Valens (C), Gratian (R), and Valentinian II (L) and marked: pietas d·d·d·n·n·n· augustorum (Note: "the Piety of Our Lords Augusti". This medal was set in a later pendant and found in the Szilágysomlyo Treasure, a hoard from the second quarter of the 5th century (Kunsthistorisches Museum))

The Roman Empire ca. 400 with provinces and dioceses and division into west and east

In 368, Valentinian was made aware of reports of magical practices in Rome and ordered the use of torture, but later backed down under protests from the Senate. Nevertheless, many prominent Roman citizens underwent investigation and execution. The affair led to a deterioration in the relations between emperor and senate. On the 9 April 370, according to the Consularia Constantinopolitana and the Chronicon Paschale, the Church of the Holy Apostles adjoining the Mausoleum of Constantine in Constantinople was inaugurated. In 375, the Baths of Carosa (Latin: Thermae Carosianae) – named for Valens's daughter – were inaugurated in Constantinople.

==== Religious policy ====
In the fourth century, following Constantine (r. 307–311), Christianity spread steadily throughout the population of the empire, in various forms, such that by the accession of Valentinian in 364 most people were Christian by default. In this time the church became progressively more organized and hierarchical and the episcopate both more powerful and increasingly drawn from aristocratic and curial circles. One of the most prominent was the Nicene Ambrose, the son of a praetorian prefect in Gaul, who became bishop of Milan (374–397). Ambrose was initially a consularis of the conjoined provinces of Liguria-Aemilia, but when chosen to be bishop was advanced through all the lower clerical ranks in order to take office. When Ambrose's predecessor as bishop of Milan, the Arian Auxentius (355–374), died, the sectarian violence between the Nicene and Arian Christians in the city had increased. The new bishop arrived with soldiers from the Roman army to suppress the violence by force.

Although bishops of Rome, such as Damasus (366–384) tended to have greater authority, they were still far from the absolutism of later popes. Christianity in the Greek speaking eastern empire was more complex than the Latin speaking west. The eastern emperors were more inclined to inject themselves into ecclesiastical affairs and historically had three sees that claimed an apostolic foundation, and hence primacy, Alexandria, Antioch and Jerusalem.These sees found them themselves competing for power with the newly established Constantinople episcopate whose power was growing with the burgeoning imperial bureaucracy. This was the background which Valens found himself having to deal with.

According to the 5th-century Greek historian Sozomen, Valentinian was an orthodox Nicene Christian, but was largely indifferent to the ecclesiastical conflicts of his time. His laicism was especially welcomed by pagans. On the other hand, his second wife, Justina was a committed homoian, a sect of Arianism. Like Valentinian, her origins were Pannonian, which with the western Balkans was the centre of the anti-Nicene theology, in contrast to the Nicenes of Gaul and Italy.

The 5th-century Greek historian Socrates Scholasticus tells that while serving as in the protectores Valens refused pressure to offer sacrifice in ancient Roman religion during the reign of the pagan emperor Julian (r. 361–363). Valens was also a homoian, and aggressively promoted it, exiling Athanasius the Trinitarian Bishop of Alexandria, soon after his accession in 364. (Note: Athanasius had been repeatedly exiled by successive emperors) His response to ecclesiastical disputes was to uphold the canons of Constantius II's councils of 368, those of the Council of Ariminum (Rimini) in the west and the Council of Seleucia in the east. These had both promulgated Arianism. Valentinian's tolerance only went so far, promulgating legislation against heretical sects and unscrupulous clerics, suppressing the meetings of Manichaeans in Rome in 372 and issuing legislation preserved in the Codex Theodosianus. He also legislated against Donatism among bishops in 373.

==== Foreign policy ====
For most of their reign, Valentinian and Valens were involved with defending the empire's frontiers, primarily in the northwest, where the frontier ran roughly along the Rhine and Danube rivers.

In the later years of Valens' reign, geopolitical events began to increasingly bear on the Roman Empire. On the eastern frontier, new problems arose with the incursion of nomads into the settled areas to the south of the Steppes. As the earlier Parthian Empire (247 BC–224 AD) became displaced by the more bellicose Sasanian Persians (224–651), the repercussions began to be progressively felt from Eurasia to Eastern Europe. Among these were the Huns, who by the 370s had conquered much of the area north of the Caucasus and Black Sea and were putting pressure on the Goths from the Dnieper west. To the Romans, they appeared a much greater threat than the earlier Alans, whom they placed in a tributary position. The Romans failed to appreciate the significance of these changes, with catastrophic consequences.

==== Northwest frontier ====
When a party of Alamanni visited Valentinian's headquarters to receive the customary gifts towards the end of 364, Ursatius, the magister officiorum made them an offering they considered inferior to that of his predecessor. Angered by Ursatius' attitude, they vowed revenge and crossed over the Rhine into Roman Germania and Gaul in January 365, overwhelming the Roman defences. Although at first unsuccessful, eventually Jovinus, the magister equitum in Gaul inflicted heavy losses on the enemy at Scarpona (Dieulouard) and at Catalauni (Châlons-sur-Marne), forcing them to retire. An opportunity to further weaken the Alamanni occurred in the summer of 368, when king Vithicabius was murdered in a coup, and Valentinian and his son Gratian crossed the Moenus (Main river) laying waste to their territories.

Valentinian fortified the frontier from Raetia in the east to the Belgic channel, but the construction was attacked by Alamanni at Mount Pirus (the Spitzberg, Rottenburg am Neckar). In 369 (or 370) Valentinian sought to enlist the help of the Burgundians, who were involved in a dispute with the Alamanni, but a communication failure led to them returning to their lands without joining forces with the Romans. Then the magister equitum, Count Theodosius and his son Theodosius (the Theodosi) attacked the Alamanni through Raetia, taking many prisoners and resettling them in the Po Valley in Italy. A key to Alamanni success was their kings. Valentinian made one attempt to capture Macrianus in 372, but eventually made peace with him in 374.

The necessity to make peace was the increasing threat from other peoples, the Quadi and the Sarmatians. Valentinian's decision to establish garrisons across the Danube had angered them, and the situation escalated after the Quadi king, Gabinus, was killed during negotiations with the Romans in 374. Consequently, in the autumn, the Quadi crossed the Danube plundering Pannonia and the provinces to the south. The situation deteriorated further once the Sarmatians made common cause inflicting heavy losses on the Pannonica and Moesiaca legions. However, on encountering Theodosius' forces on the borders of Moesia in the eastern Balkans, which had previously defeated one of their armies in 373, they sued for peace. Valentinian mounted a further offensive against the Quadi in August 375, this time using a pincer movement, one force attacking from the northwest, while Valentinian himself headed to Aquincum (Budapest), crossed the Danube and attacked from the southeast. This campaign resulted in heavy losses to the enemy, following which he returned to Aquincum and from there to Brigetio (Szőny, Hungary) where he died suddenly in November.

==== Africa ====
The Austoriani, a warlike tribe, had made considerable inroads in to the province of Africa Tripolitania. At the time the comes per Africam (comes Africae), Romanus, was said to be corrupt and to have concealed the real state of affairs from Valentinian and his envoys, having powerful allies at court. Eventually Firmus, a Berber prince of the Iubaleni tribe, led a rebellion in 372, proclaiming himself augustus. This time Valentinian dispatched Count Theodosius in 373 to restore order, who immediately had Romanus arrested. After a prolonged campaign in the coastal plains of Mauretania Caesariensis, Theodosius eroded support for Firmus by diplomatic means, the latter committing suicide in 374. Although the African campaign cemented Theodosius' reputation, intrigues following Valentinian's death in late 375 led to an investigation and he was executed at Carthage.

==== Eastern frontier ====
===== Sasanians =====
Map of the Caucasus region at the beginning of the 4th C.

In the east, Valens was faced with the threat of the Persian Sasanian Empire and the Goths. Sapor, the Sasanian king had Arsaces murdered in 368, placing Armenia under Persian control. During the siege of Artogerassa (Artagerk) in Arsharunik, Arsaces' son Papa (Pap) was smuggled out, joining Valens' court, then at Neocaesaria, in Pontus Polemoniacus. Valens, fearful of violating the treaty of non-interference that Jovian had signed with Sapor in 363, returned Papa in 369 in the company of Terentius, dux Armeniae. But Sapor renewed his attempts to subdue Armenia, capturing Artogerassa together with Papa's mother, Queen Pharantzem and the royal treasury. At this point Valens decided to act, sending his magister peditum, Arintheus to join Terentius in the defence of Armenia. Although Sapor signed a treaty directly with Papa and warned off Valens, the latter pressed on, restoring Sauromaces (Saurmag), a pretender in Iberia in the Caucasus Mountains. Although Sapor retaliated by invading Roman territory, the encounter between the two armies at Vagabanta (Bagrevand) in the spring of 371 was inclusive, and both sides retreated to their respective capitals. Valens, who interpreted the treaty with Sapor as treachery, invited Papa to his court in 373 and arrested him, but the latter escaped. Valens then ordered the dux Armeniae to arrange for Papa to be murdered in 374, which was carried out. Meanwhile, Sapor was demanding a Roman withdrawal from Iberia and Armenia, which Valens refused to do, leading to a long diplomatic conflict regarding the validity of the treaty Jovian had signed. Valens was distracted from his campaign against the Sasanians by wars against the Saracens and the Isaurians. Eventually the conflict between the two sides was overtaken by developments in the western part of Valens territory, once the Danube frontier was breached in 376.

==== Goths and Huns ====
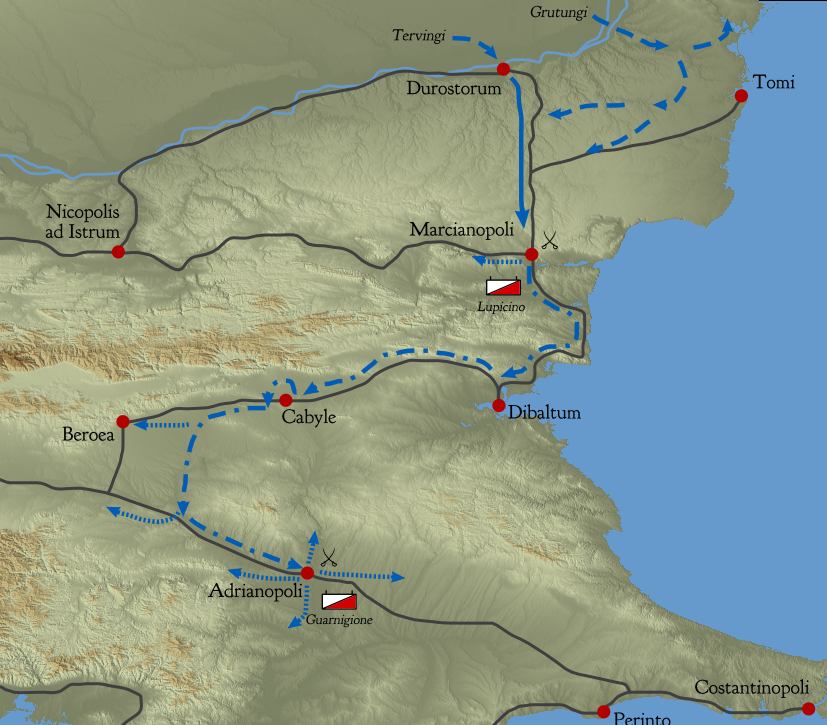
Movement of Gothic tribes south of the Danube in 376

In 366, Valens accused the Goths of breaching their 332 treaty with Constantine by aiding the usurper Procopius in 365. However, relations with the Goths had been deteriorating since Julian's contemptuous dismissal of them in 362. In any case, Valens had already attempted to secure the Danubian frontier, but a series of campaigns during 367 to 369 failed to subdue the Goths. Valens then had to deal with Goths to the northwest and Sasanians to the east simultaneously, and decided to make peace with the former, by a treaty with king Athanaric in 369, according to Themistius and Zosimus. Under this treaty, the Goths undertook not to cross the Danube. But any respite was short lived due to the continuing westward expansion of the Huns, who were progressively pushing refugees to the banks of the Dniester. They soon encountered the Tervingi Goths under Athanaric, forcing them to consider crossing the Danube into safer Thrace. In early 376 they petitioned Valens to that end, seeking Roman protection, and in the autumn he agreed to this. Estimates of the numbers who crossed vary between 90,000 and 200,000, but they outnumbered the Roman troops stationed there. There they were harassed by a corrupt official, Lupicinus, the Thracian comes rei militaris. Hostilities rapidly escalated, with Lupicinus seizing two of their chieftains, Fritigern and Alavivus. Lupicinus, then realising his management of the Danube crossing had been disastrously mismanaged decided on a full-scale attack on the Goths near Marcianopolis in Moesia Inferior (Bulgaria), and was promptly routed, leaving Thrace undefended from the north. This was the beginning of the Gothic war of 376–382, one of many Gothic wars fought between the Romans and Goths.

Valens was at Antioch at the time, preoccupied with the conflict with the Sasanians over Armenia. Realising the implications of the defeat, he quickly made peace with the Sasanians and made plans to restore control of Thrace. He sought help from his nephew Gratian, now the western emperor, and took his forces across to Europe in the spring of 377, pressing the Goths into the Haemus mountains and meeting the legions dispatched from Pannonia and Gaul at a place called ad Salices, near Marcianopolis. The resulting Battle of the Willows produced heavy casualties on both sides, but no victory. Meanwhile, the Goths were consolidating their position with alliances between them and Huns and Alans, while Gratian was obliged to pull back his forces in February 378 to deal with incursions by the Lentienses across the Rhine in Raetia. Valens' next sally against the Goths, at Adrianople, in the summer of 378, would prove both disastrous and fatal (see Battle of Adrianople).

==== Usurpers and rebellions ====
In addition to foreign invaders, Valentinian and Valens had to deal with a series of domestic threats.

==== Procopius the Usurper (365–366) ====
On 1 November 365, while on his way to Lutetia (Paris), Valentinian learned of the appearance of the usurper Procopius in Constantinople, but was unable to move against him, judging a simultaneous invasion of Gaul by Alamanni a greater threat to the empire. Procopius was a native of Cilicia and was related to the late emperor Julian, under whose command he had served on the Mesopotamian frontier. On Julian's death in 363, he accompanied his remains to their burial place at Tarsus, Turkey. Rumours that Julian had wished Procopius to succeed him, rather than Jovian, who had been acclaimed, forced him into hiding until Jovian's death in 364. In the spring of 365, sensing the unpopularity of Valens, who had succeeded Jovian in 364, he made plans for a possible coup, persuading some of the legions to recognise him during the emperor's absence in Antioch, directing military operations. Following acclamation he installed himself in the Imperial palace in Constantinople on 28 September. Valens was informed of the coup while preparing to march east from Caesarea in Cappadocia (Kayseri). Valens now faced an internal rebellion, Gothic incursions in Thrace and a Persian threat in the east. He dispatched the Jovii and Victores legions to put down the rebellion. However, Procopius had quickly established himself, winning over generals and military units, including two that Julian passed over, Gomoarius and Agilo. He falsely proclaimed the death of Valentinian I in the west and recruited Gothic troops to his side, claiming his Constantinian legacy. As part of his claim to legitimacy Procopius ensured he was always accompanied by the princess Constantia, still a child, and her mother, the dowager empress Faustina. Constantia had been born to the emperor Constantius II (r. 337–361) and his third wife Faustina after her father's death.

Procopius' use of his Constantinian hostages met with some success. According to Ammianus Marcellinus, when Valens forces met the usurper's army at Mygdus (Note: The exact location of Mygdus, mentioned by Marcellinus, is unknown but is believed to be east of Nicaea) on the river Sangarius in Phrygia, Procopius denounced the Pannonian accession and persuaded the advancing legions to defect. Although Procopius suffered a setback in the west, when Aequitius, magister militum per Illyricum, succeeded in blocking all the communicating passages between the eastern and western empires, in the east he rapidly consolidated his hold over Bithynia. Following his initial rebuff, Valens regrouped with the aid of Lupicinus, his magister militum per Orientem and marched on Procopius's army in Lydia. Valens then employed a countermeasure to Procopius' use of Constantia to claim legitimacy, by recruiting Flavius Arbitio, a distinguished general under Constantine I. As a result, Gomoarius and Agilo, and who were leading the usurper's forces, again switched sides and led their men over to Valens at Thyatira around April 366. Valens now pressed his advantage, advancing into Phrygia, where he encountered Procopius at Nacolia, and again the latter's general Agilo defected. Procopius fled, but his own commanders seized and took him to Valens, who ordered all of them beheaded.

==== The Great Conspiracy (365–366) ====
In June 367, Valentinian learned of what appeared to be a coordinated uprising. In Roman Britain the provinces were threatened by an invasion of Picts, Scots and Attacotti from the north, while Franks and Saxons threatened the coastal regions of the lower Rhine. This came to be known as the "Great Conspiracy" (barbarica conspiratio). A series of military responses were unsuccessful until Valentinian called on one of his Spanish commanders, Count Theodosius (Theodosius the Elder), who was comes rei militaris. Embarking at Bononia (Boulogne-sur-Mer), Theodosius landed at Rutupiae (Richborough, Kent) and quickly subdued London. Moving north on 369 he encountered yet another uprising, that of Valentinus, an exiled Pannonian general. Having overthrown and executed Valetinus, Theodosius set about restoring the defences of the frontier and major settlements, establishing a new province of Valentia. Having sent messages regarding his victories back to Valentinian, he returned to court and was promoted to magister equitum. In the autumn of 368 the Franks and Saxons were also driven back by Jovinus. (Note: The exact details and chronology of this rebellion are unclear and disputed)

==== Death of Valentinian I (375) and succession ====
Valentinian I died at Brigetio (Szőny) on 17 November 375 while on campaign against the Quadi in Pannonia. He may have died of stroke. Following his death, Valentinian's body was prepared for burial and started its journey to Constantinople, where it arrived the following year, on 28 December 376, but was not yet buried. According to the Consularia Constantinopolitana, his remains were eventually interred in the Mausoleum of Constantine, to which the Church of the Holy Apostles was attached, on 21 February 382, beside those of his first wife and the mother of Gratian, Marina Severa. He was deified, as was the custom, becoming known in Latin: Divus Valentinianus Senior, lit. 'the Divine Valentinian the Elder'.

With the death of Valentinian I, in the east Valens became the senior augustus and the 16-year-old Gratian was the only augustus in the western empire. To complicate matters further for Gratian, certain among Valentinian's generals then promoted his four-year-old second son Valentinian II (Gratian's half brother), the army on the Danube acclaiming him augustus in a palatine coup at Aquincum (Budapest) on 22 November 375, despite Gratian's existing prerogatives. The young Valentinian II was essentially the subject of the influence of his courtiers and mother, the Arian Christian Justina. Gratian's tutor, Ausonius, became his quaestor, and together with the magister militum, Merobaudes, the power behind the throne. Negotiations eventually left Gratian as the senior western emperor. Valens and Valentinian II were consuls for the year 376, Valens's fifth consulship. Neither Gratian or Valentinian travelled much, which was thought to be due to not wanting the populace to realise how young they were. Gratian is said to have visited Rome in 376, possibly to celebrate his decennalia on 24 August, but whether the visit actually took place is disputed.

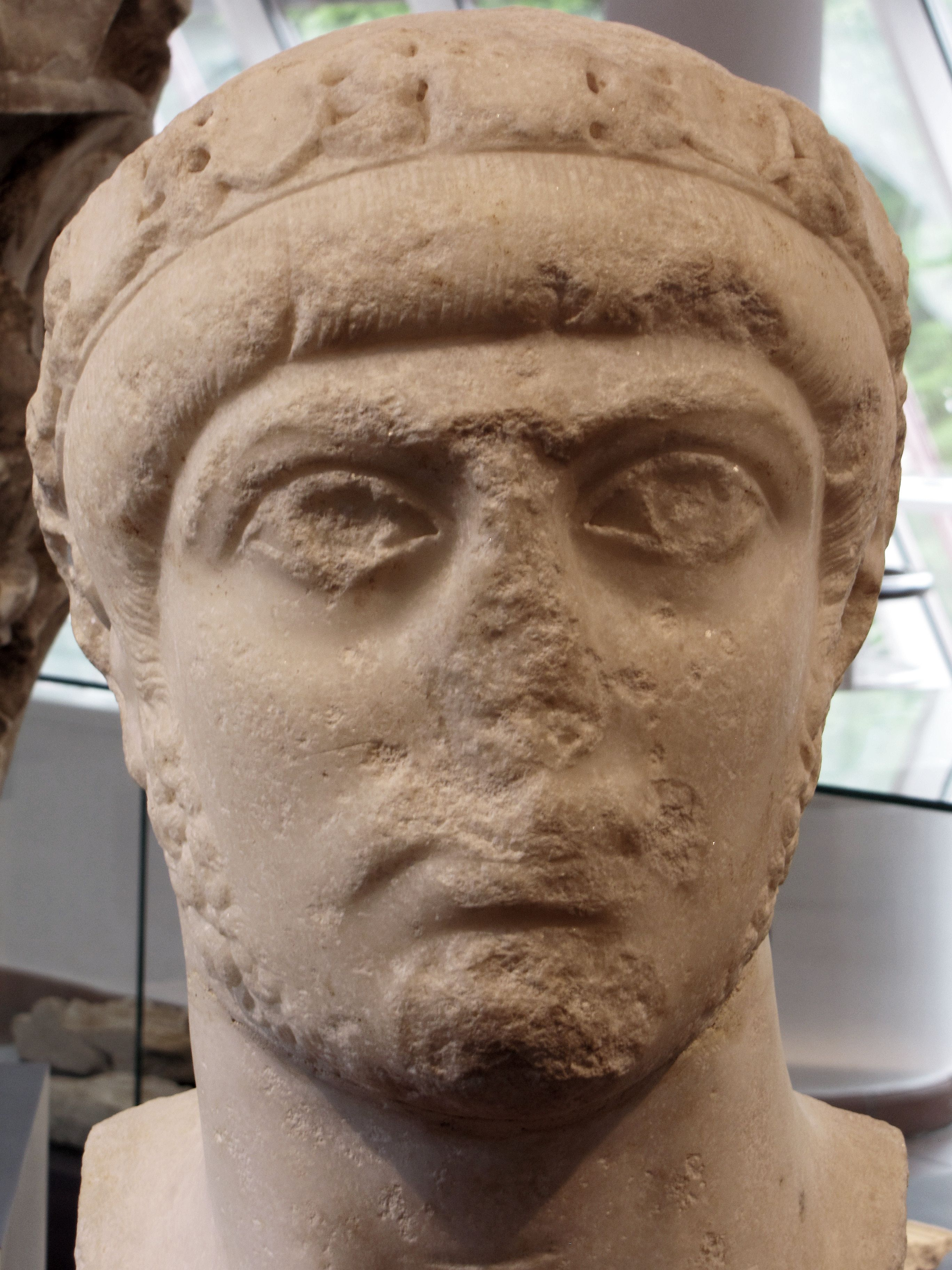
Marble portrait head of Gratian (Rheinisches Landesmuseum Trier)

==== Battle of Adrianople and death of Valens (378) ====
Once Gratian had put down the invasions in the west in early 378, he notified Valens that he was returning to Thrace to assist him in his struggle against the Goths. Late in July, Valens was informed that the Goths were advancing on Adrianople (Edirne) and Nice, and started to move his forces into the area. However, Gratian's arrival was delayed by an encounter with Alans at Castra Martis, in Dacia in the western Balkans. Advised of the wisdom of awaiting the western army, Valens decided to ignore this advice because he was sure of victory and unwilling to share the glory. Frigern and the Goths sought to avoid conflict and attempted to parlay, but Valens rejected any suggestion of ceding Thrace. On 9 August, Valens ordered his forces towards the Gothic encampment. He again dismissed their embassies, but acceded to the suggestion that sending some noble hostages could calm the Gothic forces, and they were duly dispatched. As this was occurring, a skirmish arose between a group of Roman archers, and some Gothic guards. Immediately, the Gothic cavalry units charged the Roman ranks and the two armies became engaged in full strength. Although the left flank of the Roman army almost reached the enemy camp, they were thrown back. The Romans who were in full armour in intense heat, began to tire in the afternoon, and their lines broke, resulting in a flight from the battlefield. Valens attempted to rally his men unsuccessfully and the Goths fell on the retreating forces until dark fell. While escaping, Valens himself was killed by an arrow, together with two thirds of his forces, and many of its leaders, together with much of the imperial treasure. It is estimated that between fifteen and thirty thousand Roman soldiers died that day. Ammianus Marcellinus and Paulus Orosius described it as the worst Roman military disaster since Hannibal's victory at the Battle of Cannae in 216 BC. After his death, Valens was deified by consecratio as Latin: Divus Valens, lit. 'the Divine Valens'.

=== Second generation: Gratian and Valentinian II (375–394) ===
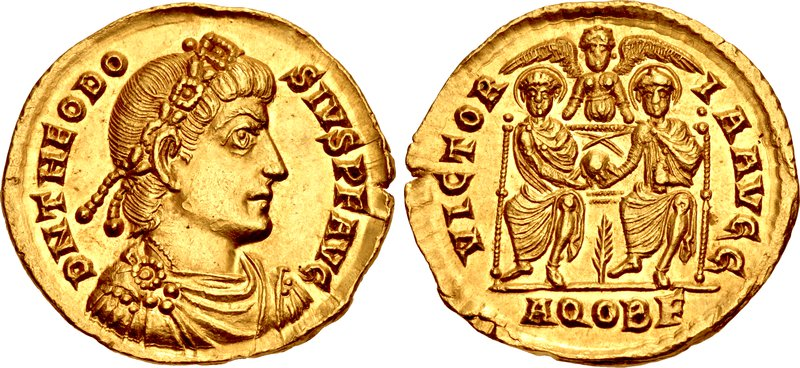
Solidus of Theodosius I showing Theodosius and Gratian on the reverse, marked: victoria augg ("the Victory of the Augusti")

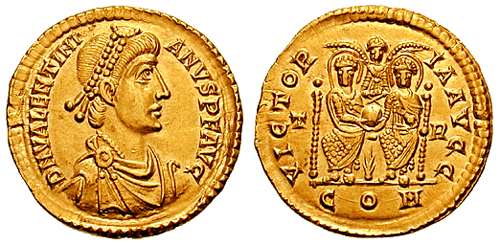
Solidus of Valentinian II showing Valentinian and Theodosius I on the reverse, marked victoria augg ("the Victory of the Augusti")

==== Gratian (378–383) ====
With the death of Valens in 378, Gratian (r. 367–383) was now the senior augustus, Valentinian II being only 7 years old, while Gratian was 19. Following the Battle of Adrianople, Gratian moved to Sirmium in the western Balkans to consider his options. The Goths had overrun the eastern Balkans (Moesia and Thrace), while in the west Gaul was under increasing threat from Franks and Alamanni. Gratian quickly realised he could not rule the whole empire on his own, and in particular he needed military expertise. He reached out to the younger Theodosius, son of Count Theodosius, living in retirement on the family estates in Spain, bringing him to Sirmium as magister equitum. On 19 January, he crowned him augustus as the eastern emperor Theodosius I (r. 379–395). In 371, Gratian was consul for the second time, and for the third time in 374.

The new augustus's territory spanned the Roman praetorian prefecture of the East, including the Roman diocese of Thrace, and the additional dioceses of Dacia and of Macedonia. Theodosius the Elder, who had died in 375, was then deified as: Divus Theodosius Pater, lit. 'the Divine Father Theodosius'. Theodosius' first priority was to rebuild the depleted legions, with sweeping conscription laws, but to do so he needed to recruit large numbers of non-Romans, further changing an empire that was becoming increasingly diverse. After several more unsuccessful encounters with the Goths, he made peace, finally ending the Gothic War of 376–382, but in doing so settled large numbers of barbarians on the Danube in Lower Moesia, Thrace, Dacia Ripensis, and Macedonia. The treaty was signed on 3 October. On 3 August that year, Gratian issued an edict against heresy.

In 380, Gratian was made consul for the fifth time and Theodosius for the first. In September the augusti Gratian and Theodosius met, returning the Roman diocese of Dacia to Gratian's control and that of Macedonia to Valentinian II. The same year, Gratian won a victory, possibly over the Alamanni, that was announced officially at Constantinople. In the autumn of 378 Gratian issued an edict of religious toleration.

Sometime in 383, Gratian's wife Constantia died. Gratian remarried, wedding Laeta, whose father was a consularis of Roman Syria. Gratian was awarded the victory titles of Germanicus Maximus and Alamannicus Maximus, and Francicus Maximus and Gothicus Maximus in 369.

==== Religious policy ====
On accession, Gratian accepted the traditional title and role of pontifex maximus (high priest), (Note: Tradition dictated that the revenues of the Pontifex helped support the colleges of priests, including Pontiffs, Augurs, Flamens and Vestals) though by then largely honorific. According to Zosimus, in 382 Gratian refused the robe of office of the pontifex maximus from a delegation of senators from Rome. The accuracy of the story is disputed, Zosimus being considered an unreliable source. No such garment was associated with the priesthood. Zosimus also stated that Gratian had repudiated the pagan title, as unlawful for a Christian to hold, and that no further emperor used that title, which became pontifex inclitus (or inclytus), "honourable priest".

With the collapse of the Danube frontier (Note: See also Roman military frontiers and fortifications) under the incursions of the Huns and Goths, Gratian moved his seat from Augusta Treverorum (Trier) to Mediolanum (Milan) in 381, and was increasingly aligned with the city's bishop, Ambrose (374–397), and the Roman Senate, shifting the balance of power within the factions of the Western empire. Gratian was then forthright in his promotion of Nicene Christianity. He ordered the removal of the Altar of Victory from the Roman Senate's Curia Julia in the winter of 383/383. (Note: The winged statue and altar of Victory had been placed in the Senate by Augustus in 29 BC, to commemorate the triumph of the spirit of Rome over her adversaries. As such it was a focal symbol of senate deliberations. It had a chequered history, being first removed by Constantius II in 357 and restored by Julian) State endowments for pagan cults were cancelled, and the Vestals, or vestal virgins (Latin: vestales) deprived of their stipends.

==== Death of Gratian (383): Magnus Maximus the Usurper (383—388) ====
In June 383 Gratian took his army through the Brenner pass and into Gaul, where the Alamanni were pushing into Raetia. At the same time, a rebellion broke out in Britain under Magnus Maximus (r. 383–388), the comes Britanniarum (commander of the Roman troops in Britain), where there had been a smouldering discontent since the elevation of Theodosius. Magnus Maximus, who had served under the comes Theodosius and had won a victory over the Picts in 382, was proclaimed augustus by his troops in the Spring of 383 and crossed the channel, encamping near Lutetia (Paris). While the legions on the Rhine welcomed him, those in Gaul remained loyal to Gratian. After five days of skirmishes between the two forces, Gratian's troops began to lose confidence in him and his General (magister peditum), Merobaudes defected to this usurper, forcing Gratian to flee towards the Alps, accompanied by some cavalry. Gratian was pursued by Andragathius, Maximus' magister equitum who apprehended him crossing the Rhone at Lugdunum (Lyon). On 23 August 383, according to the Consularia Constantinopolitana, Gratian, then 24, and his ministers were executed. Having secured Gratian's territories, Maximus then established his court at the former imperial residence in Trier.

The body of Constantia, Gratian's first wife, who had died earlier that year, arrived in Constantinople on 12 September 383 and was buried in the complex of the Church of the Holy Apostles (Apostoleion) on 1 December, the resting place of a number of members of the imperial family, starting with Constantine in 337, under the direction of Theodosius, who had embarked on making the site a dynastic symbol. This was the last occasion that a member of the western imperial family was buried in the east, a new mausoleum being built at St Peter's Basilica in Rome. According to Augustine of Hippo's The City of God and Theodoret's Historia Ecclesiastica, Gratian and Constantia had had a son, who died in infancy before 383 but had been born before 379. Gratian was deified as Latin: Divus Gratianus, lit. 'the Divine Gratian'. His remains were finally interred in Mediolanum in 387 or 388.

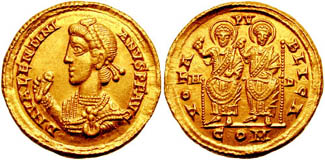
Solidus of Valentinian II showing Valentinian and Theodosius I on the reverse, each holding a mappa

On the death of Gratian, the 12-year-old Valentinian II (r. 375–392) became the sole augustus in the west. Maximus attempted to persuade Valentinian to move his court to Trier, but Ambrose, suspecting treachery, made excuses while securing the alpine passes. Maximus then demanded recognition from Theodosius. Although Valentinian's court looked east to Theodosius for assistance, the latter was preoccupied with establishing his own dynasty, having elevated his eldest son Arcadius (r. 383–408) to augustus on his quinquennalia, on 19 August 383. He was also dealing with threats on his eastern frontier that precluded any western military excursions.

In the summer of 384, Valentinian met his junior co-augustus Theodosius, and in November he celebrated his decennalia. The position of the senior emperor Valentinian, was strengthened during the first few months of Maximus' rule, while Ambrose was conducting negotiations on the emperors' behalf.

Eventually Theodosius decided to recognise the usurper and brokered an uneasy peace agreement between Valentinian and Magnus Maximus in the summer of 384 which endured for several years. Under this agreement Maximus kept the western portion of the Empire including Britain, Spain and Gaul, while Valentinian ruled over Italy, Africa and Illyricum, allowing Theodosius to concentrate on his eastern problems and the threat to Thrace.

The peace with Magnus Maximus was broken in 386 or 387, when he invaded Italy from the west. Valentinian, escaped with Justina, reaching Thessalonica (Thessaloniki) in the eastern empire in the summer or autumn of 387, appealing to Theodosius for aid. Magnus Maximus reached Milan to begin his consulship of 388, where he was welcomed by Symmachus. Valentinian II's sister Galla was then married to the eastern augustus at Thessalonica in late autumn. Justina, widow of Valentinian I and mother of Valentinian II, died in summer 388. In June, the meeting of Christians deemed heretics was banned. In summer 388, Italy was recovered for Valentinian from Magnus Maximus, whom Theodosius defeated at the Battle of Poetovio and eventually executed at Aquileia on 28 August.

==== Valentinian II (383–392) ====
Following the defeat of Magnus Maximus by Theodosius in 388, Valentinian was restored to the throne. On 18 June 389, Theodosius arrived in Rome to display his second son, the five-year-old Honorius. He reconciled with Magnus Maximus' supporters and pardoned Symmachus, then in hiding, since he needed the support of the Gallo-Hispanic aristocracy, of which both he and Maximus were members. Theodosius then decided to stay in Milan, making sure that Valentinian was under the influence of his supporters. Overall, Theodosius, a skilled diplomat, made it clear that in practice he was the sole emperor of the two empires.

It was not until 15 April of 391 that Theodosius decided to return to the east, to deal with a family conflict between his eldest son Arcadius, now fourteen, and his second wife Galla. Before his departure he consolidated his hold on the empire. He dispatched the nineteen-year-old Valentinian, who had been a mere figurehead, and his court to Trier, giving him jurisdiction over the western part of the empire. Theodosius also placed Valentinian under the unofficial regency of his trusted Frankish general (magister militum) Arbogast, who had defeated the Franks in 389. In Italy he placed the civil administration under the prefect, Virius Nicomachus Flavianus. This allowed him to control the west remotely, while he ruled the remainder directly, from Italy eastwards, from Constantinople. In doing so, he inadvertently created a hierarchy, with the northwest as the junior partner in the empire.

Valentinian attempted to exert his independence in the spring of 392, dismissing Arbogast. The latter defied Valentinian stating that only Theodosius could reverse his own appointment. On 15 May 392, Valentinian II was found dead at Vienna (Vienne), Gaul, at the age of 21, either by suicide or as part of a plot by Arbogast. Valentinian II was buried next to his half-brother and co-augustus Gratian in Mediolanum in late August or early September 392. He was deified with the consecratio: Divae Memoriae Valentinianus, lit. 'the Divine Memory of Valentinian'.

==== Religious policies ====
The death of Gratian in 383, brought religious conflict to the fore again. The Altar of Victory was an important symbol to the Roman pagan aristocracy, who hoped that the young Valentinian would look on their cause more favourably. In the autumn of 384, the Senator Q Aurelius Symmachus, then prefect of Rome (Latin: praefectus urbi) pleaded with Valentinian for its return to the Curia Julia, but Ambrose succeeded in firmly rejecting such a suggestion. While the bishop held considerable sway over the emperor, tensions began to emerge.

According to Ambrose's Sermon Against Auxentius and his 76th Epistle when the bishop was summoned to the court of Valentinian II and his mother Justina in 385, the Nicene Christians appeared en masse to support him, threatening the emperor's security and offering themselves to be martyred by the army. In March 386, the court asked that the city's summer-time cathedral, the Basilica Nova, be made available for the Arian community in the army for Easter, but Ambrose refused. On Palm Sunday, the praetorian prefect proposed that the Portian Basilica be used instead. Ambrose rejected the request but on 9 April was ordered to hand over the building and the Nicene Christians occupied the building. On Holy Wednesday, the army surrounded the Portian Basilica, but Ambrose held a service at the winter-time Basilica Vetus, after which the Nicenes moved to rescue their co-religionists in the Portian Basilica, among them Augustine of Hippo and his mother, chanting Psalm 79. Although Valentinian backed down under the popular pressure, but relations between court and church, and the Arians succeeded in getting a law passed recognising the creed of Ariminum (359).

On 23 January 386, Valentinian issued an edict of toleration regarding the Arian Christians, after receiving the Arian bishop Auxentius at court. Magnus Maximus, who was a Nicene Christian, then wrote to Valentinian, attacking his favourable treatment of the Arians, and also contacted Pope Siricius and Theodosius. The same year Theodosius recognized Magnus Maximus's nominee for consul, Flavius Euodius, and Magnus Maximus's official portrait is known to have been shown at Alexandria, in the part of the empire administered by Theodosius.

On Valentinian's restoration, Theodosius' clemency emboldened the supporters of the altar of Victory to once more travel to Milan to request its return, but their pleas were rejected and Symmachus exiled from Rome (though eventually forgiven and given a consulship). With Theodosius now in power in Milan he frequently clashed with Bishop Ambrose, who had stood his ground when Maximus' forces arrived. Ambrose's increasing political power, together with his fanatical supporters forced the emperor to back down on several occasions, illustrating the ascendancy of the Catholic Nicene church. The power of Ambrose reached its peak when he threatened Theodosius with excommunication, following the massacre of Salonica in 390, until he publicly repented. This solidified the Church's position that man must serve God first, and the emperor second. Having established this precedent, Ambrose could now press the emperor into a major suppression of paganism, starting in February 391.

=== Theodosian interregnum (392–423) ===
On the death of Valentinian II in 392, Theodosius became the sole adult emperor, with his two sons Arcadius and Honorius as junior emperors, over the east and west respectively. Theodosius was also the last emperor to rule both halves of the Roman Empire. Arcadius and Honorius were Theodosius' two surviving sons by his first marriage to Aelia Flaccilla, together with their sister Pulcheria On Aelia's death in 386, Theodosius cemented his dynastic legitimacy by marrying Valentinian II's younger sister (and hence daughter of Valentinian I and Justina) Galla in 387. (Note: In late antiquity, great weight was placed on Kēdeia (Greek: κηδεία), the bonds of kinship) By her, he had a son, Gratian (b. 388/389), who died in infancy in 394, and a daughter, Aelia Galla Placidia (b. 392/393). Another son, John (Latin: Ioannes), may have been born in 394. Galla, herself, died at the end of April 394 according to Zosimus.

Theodosius' reign was immediately challenged. Arbogast, seeking to wield imperial power, was unable to assume the role of emperor himself because of his non-Roman background. Instead, on 22 August at the behest of Arbogast, a magister scrinii and vir clarissimus, Eugenius (r. 392–394), was acclaimed augustus at Lugdunum. Like Maximus he sought Theodosius's recognition in vain, minting new coins bearing the image of Theodosius and his son Arcadius in both trier and Milan, and attempting to recruit Ambrose as negotiator.

Any hopes that Theodosius would recognise Eugenius dissipated when, according to Polemius Silvius, Theodosius raised his second son Honorius to augustus on 23 January 393, the year of his third consulship citing Eugenius's illegitimacy. According to Socrates Scholasticus, Theodosius defeated Eugenius at the Battle of the Frigidus (the Vipava river) on 6 September 394 and on 1 January 395, Honorius arrived in Mediolanum where a victory celebration was held.

According to the Consularia Constantinopolitana, Theodosius died in Mediolanum on 17 January 395. His funeral was held there on 25 February, and his body transferred to Constantinople, where according to the Chronicon Paschale he was buried on 8 November 395 in the Church of the Holy Apostles. He was deified as: Divus Theodosius, lit. 'the Divine Theodosius'.

==== Religious policy ====
Eugenius made some limited concessions to the Roman religion. On 8 November 392, all cult worship of the gods was forbidden by Theodosius.

==== Sons of Theodosius (395–425) ====
On the death of Theodosius I in 392, the empire became permanently divided between his sons. The two sons, who had been made junior emperors as children, by their father, were only 15 and 8 years old respectively, and thus figureheads under the control of guardians (Latin: parens). These, in turn, were often locked in struggles for power with each other. The most influential was Stilicho, himself a Vandal and supreme commander (Latin: comes et magister utriusque militiae praesentalis, lit. 'count and master of all forces') of Theodosius' army. Stilicho had allied himself to the dynasty by marrying Theodosius' adopted niece, Serena, and claimed he had been appointed parens of the whole empire, but this role was rejected by the eastern court. He then further strengthened his dynastic position by marrying his daughters, first Maria and on her death Thermantia, to the emperor Honorius. This period saw both an acceleration of the barbarisation of the western army and a massive settling of Roman lands by barbarian tribes. These were mainly Germanic tribes, with Visigoths and Burgundians in Gaul. Britain was abandoned and Italy itself became increasingly vulnerable to infiltration by barbarian forces, and progressively contracted to resemble more a government of Italy than an empire, while accommodation became more often the preferred foreign policy, rather than confrontation. By contrast the Constantinople court enjoyed a period of relative peace with its eastern Persian neighbours, although remaining vulnerable on its western front in Thrace and Macedonia to the forces of Alaric I. Administrative reforms in the military, with the emergence of a magister utriusque militiae or MVM, who were frequently German, often left the emperor as a puppet under their control. During this period the two empires were at worst openly hostile and at best uncooperative.

==== The invasion of Italy (400–408) and the usurpation of Constantine III (407–411) ====
Map of Gaul, with route (purple) of Via Domitia, connecting Italy and Spain

In the summer of 401, Alaric entered north Italy, marching west on Mediolanum, until halted by Stilicho at Pollentia in Piedmont at Easter 402. Although Alaric withdrew until 407, the threat was sufficient for Honorius to move his court from Mediolanum, further south to Ravenna, for security. The unintended consequence of strengthening the forces in the north east of Italy was a weakening of the Roman presence beyond the alps. The north of Italy was again overrun by Radagaisus and the Ostrogoths from Pannonia in 405, though eventually repelled. In late 406, several waves of barbarians crossed the Rhine and swept through Belgica and Gaul to the Pyrenees, capturing many important Roman strongholds, including Trier. Simultaneously a series of revolts took place in Britain, raising usurpers, the last of which was Constantine, who crossed into Gaul in the spring of 407, taking command of the Roman forces there and advancing as far as the alps. Meanwhile, Stilicho's attempts to appease Alaric and induce him to halt Constantine's advances was leading to both a deterioration in his relations with Honorius and his own popularity, culminating in a mutiny among the troops. Honorius then had Stilicho executed on 22 August 408.

Stilicho's enemies at court were fiercely anti-German, resulting in the massacre of many of them in the Roman military. As a result, many barbarians defected to Alaric, who was now emboldened to once again invade Italy, this time with his brother-in-law Ataulf the Ostragoth. Rather than invade northern Italy as before, this time they marched on Rome, arriving in the autumn of 408 and laying siege to it. In the ensuing panic and anti-German sentiment, Stilicho's wife Serena was murdered in the belief that she must be an accomplice of Alaric. After collecting a ransom from the city, Alaric withdrew north to Etruria in December. Honorius, in desperation, now decided to accept Constantine as co-emperor in 409, as Constantine III. With a breakdown in negotiations with Ravenna, Alaric marched south on Rome again. This time the Senate capitulated in late 409, agreeing to form a new government under Alaric, electing Priscus Attalus, the praefectus urbi as emperor, in opposition to Honorius. In return Alaric was made magister utriusque militiae and Ataulf comes domesticorum equitum. When Alaric then advanced on Ravenna, Honorius was only dissuaded from fleeing to Constantinople by the arrival of reinforcements from the east. Attalus' reign was short lived being deposed by Alaric in the summer of 410. When negotiations with Ravenna failed yet again, Alaric attacked Rome for the third time, entering it on 24 August 410, and this time plundering it for three days, before moving south into Bruttium. On starting to return north, Alaric fell ill and died at Consentia (Consenza) in late 410, being succeeded by Ataulf who led to Visigoths back to Gaul. Meanwhile, relations between the two western emperors, which was uneasy at best, was deteriorating. Constantine established himself in Arelate, (Arles, Provence) in the strategic province of Gallia Narbonensis, stretching from the alps in the east to the Pyrenees in the south, and thus guarding the entrances to both Italy and Spain. Through this province ran the Via Domitia, connecting Rome with Spain. He raised his son Constans to augustus and in early 410, supposedly to assist Honorius against Alaric, entered Italy but withdrew when the latter had Constantine's magister equitum executed on suspicion of treachery. The situation was further complicated by the incursion of barbarians into Spain in October 409, and the appearance of another usurper, Maximus (r. 409–411), there. Maximus' reign was short lived, his forces deserting him, while Honorius' forces, under the patriciusConstantius, captured and executed Constantine in September 411.

==== Barbarian settlement of Gaul (411–413) ====
The removal of Constantine secured south-eastern Gaul, and hence the approaches to Italy for Honorius, but was followed by further usurpation of Jovinus (r. 411–413) in Mogontiacum (Mainz), Germania Superior, in 412. Jovinus' support by a broad coalition of both Gallo-Romans and barbarians indicated the waning influence of the central Italian government in Gaul. Although Ataulf briefly allied himself with Jovinus, he then offered Honorius the defeat of the latter in exchange for a treaty, and captured and killed him in the autumn of 413. The agreement collapsed and the Visigoths occupied much of lower Aquitania and Burdigala (Bordeaux) in south west Gaul as well as the adjacent province of Gallia Narbonensis in the south east.

=== Third generation: Galla Placidia and Constantius III (392–450) ===
==== Early life at the Eastern court (388–394) ====
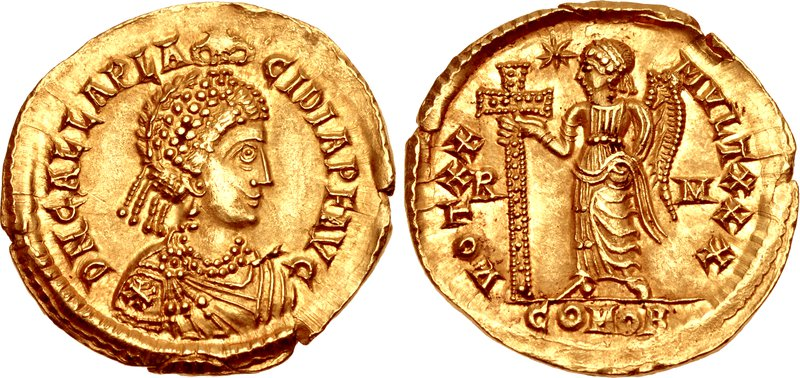
Solidus of Galla Placidia, marked: d·n· galla placidia p·f· aug· ("Our Lady Galla Placidia, Pious Happy Augusta") The reverse shows Victory and a crux gemmata

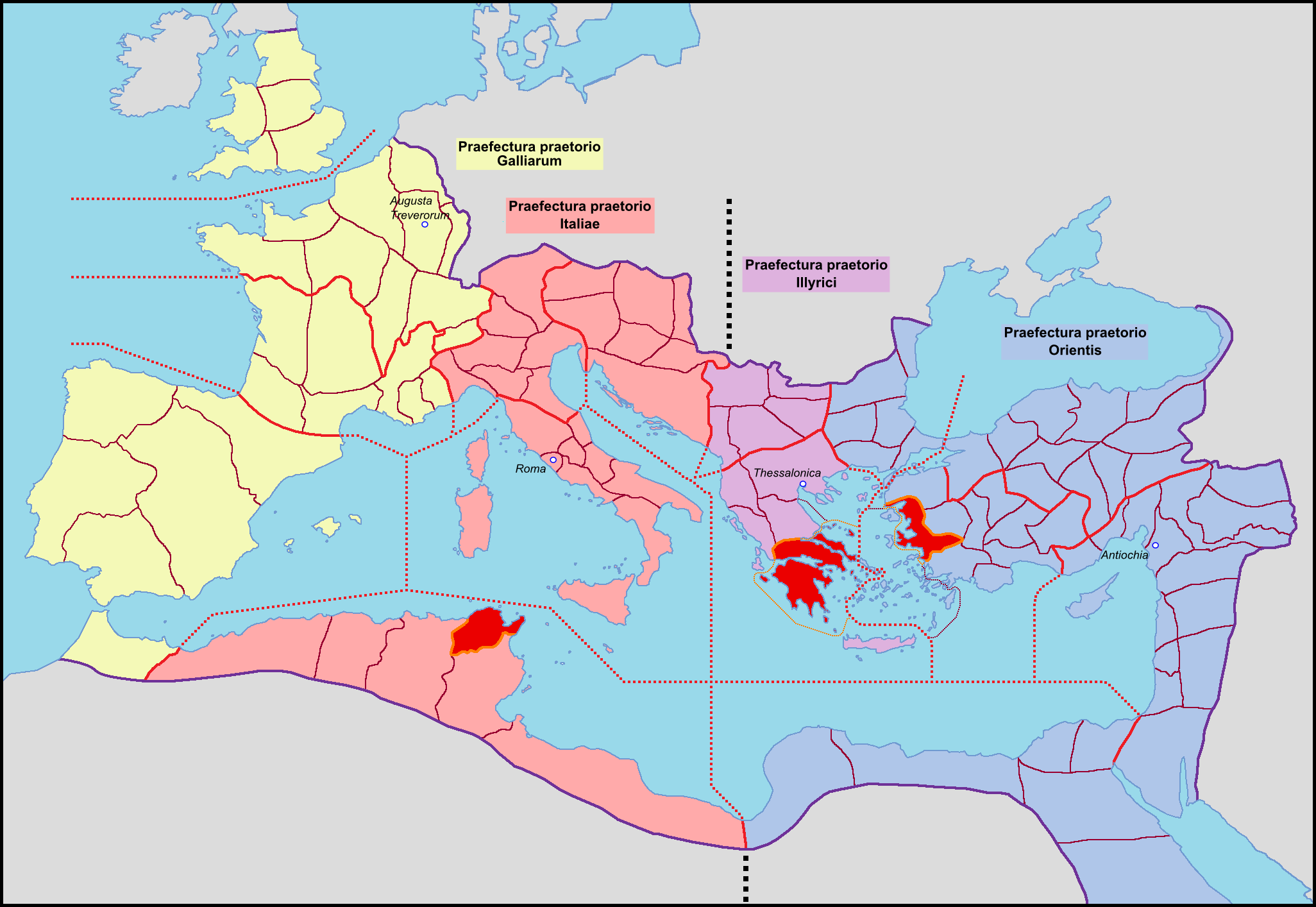
The four Praetorian prefectures in 400

Theodosius I set about establishing a stable dynasty in the east. When he raised his five year old eldest son, Arcadius, to the rank of augusta in 383 he also raised his first wife, Aelia Flaccilla as augusta. In doing so he set a new precedent. Rather than the traditional portrayal of imperial women as goddesses he invested her in the same regalia as an emperor, indicating equal status. This tradition was then continued in the house of Theodosius. The empress died in 386, shortly after her infant daughter Pulcheria, leaving him with his two young sons.

In 387 the western emperor Valentinian II, together with his mother Justina and sisters, including Galla, were forced to flee to Thessalonica by the usurper Magnus Maximus, seeking Theodosius' help. Traveling to Thessalonica to meet them, the widowed Theodosius decided to marry Galla. (Note: Galla's date of birth is not known) This move consolidated his dynastic legitimacy by marriage into the house of Valentinian. In 388 Theodosius led his army into the western empire to defeat Magnus Maximus, and Justina and her other daughters returned to Italy, leaving Galla, now pregnant, in Thessalonica, where her daughter, Galla Placidia, was born.

Galla Placidia (c. 388–450) was thus both Valentinian and Theodosian, being the daughter of Theodosius I and Galla, and hence granddaughter of Valentinian I, as well as half sister to the child emperors Honorius and Arcadius. Galla and her daughter travelled to Constantinople, where her stepson, Arcadius, rejected her, forcing Theodosius' return from Italy in 391.

According to Synesius's 61st Epistle, written c. 402, Galla and her daughter were given a palace in Constantinople that had previously been part of the property of Ablabius, a praetorian prefect of the East under Constantine I. About a year after his return, Theodosius arranged for his younger son, Honorius, then eight, to be crowned emperor. In the west, Valentinian II had died in the summer of 392 and the usurper Flavius Eugenius was proclaimed in August, and it was necessary to restore dynastic rule. Honorius' coronation took place on 23 January 393, an occasion recorded in detail by Claudian, in which all three of the Emperor's children were honoured. Galla Placidia was entitled "Most noble girl" (Latin: nobilissima puella), (Note: nobilissimus and nobilissima were generally considered signs of an intention to be raised to augustus or augusta) with the honorific prefix: domina nostra, lit. 'our lady', though this may have occurred later. Placidia also received an advanced education in secular and religious matters.

==== At the Western court (394–409) ====
Less than a year later, her mother died in childbirth in 394. Subsequently, she was raised by her father's niece Serena and her husband Stilicho, with their three children (Maria, Thermantia and Eucherius). Theodosius had adopted Serena, on the death of her father, Honorius, bringing her to Constantinople from the family estates in Spain. Theodosius then took his forces west to attack Eugenius, defeating him on 6 September. Shortly after, Theodosius became ill and sent for his children. Serena then travelled to Milan with Honorius, Placidia and her nurse Elpidia to join him. He proclaimed Honorius emperor and promoted Stilicho to magister militum, but by 17 January 395 he had died, leaving his children orphans, Placidia being seen years old. Stilicho then claimed he had been appointed parens principium to the child emperors. After the funeral, Serena and the children accompanied his body to Constantinople, where he was interred at the Church of the Holy Apostles in November. Following Theodosius' death, Stilicho strengthened his dynastic position by marrying his two daughters to Honorius in succession and betrothing his son Eucherius to Placidia, while they were all still children, while his wife Serena acted as a de facto Empress as the informal regent for Honorius. Although Placidia spent much of her early years in Milan, the continuing invasions of Visigoths led to the court moving to a more secure position further south at Ravenna in 402, but with frequent visits to Rome, where Stilicho and Serena also maintained a house.

==== Captivity (409–416) ====
Meanwhile, Stilicho's reputation was waning and his relationship with Honorius deteriorating, leading to Honorius ordering his execution in Ravenna in 408, together with Eucherius and Serena, who were in Rome with Placidia. According to Zosimus, the nobilissima puella Galla Placidia approved the Roman Senate's decision to execute Serena. All this happened against a background of Visigothic advances, laying siege to Rome in both 408 and 409, and finally sacking Rome in 410. In either 409 or 410, the teenage Galla Placidia was captured by the Visigoths and was taken through southern Italy, where Alaric died and was succeeded by Athaulf. Placidia, who was effectively a hostage, then became a bargaining item in the negotiations between the Visigoths and the Romans over a three-year period. Placidia and her captors eventually returned to southern Gaul in the spring of 412.

During the protracted negotiations between the Roman court and the Visigoths, Placidia was married to Athaulf. According to Orosius, Olympiodorus of Thebes, Philostorgius, Prosper of Aquitaine, the Chronica Gallica of 452, Hydatius, Marcellinus Comes, and Jordanes, they were married at Narbo (Narbonne) in January 414, where Athaulf had established his court on the Via Domitia in Gallia Narbonensis. They had a son, that she called Theodosius. Honorius responded with a naval blockade of Narbo under the direction of Constantius. Although Athaulf again elected Attalus as a rival emperor, but the new regime soon collapsed, Attalus was captured and the Visigoths retreated south to Colonia Faventia (Barcelona) by the end of the year. Constantius renewed his attack on them there, and in the summer of 415, Athaulf was murdered and succeeded by Sigeric, while the infant Theodosius died. Within seven days, Sigeric himself was killed and succeeded by Wallia who, desperate for food for his people, bartered Placidia for supplies and a treaty in summer 416. The treaty recruited the Visigoths against other barbarian peoples that were rapidly occupying Hispania. They were so efficient at this, that Honorius decided to settle them in southern Gaul (lower Aquitania and parts of Novempopulana and Narbonensis, excluding the seaboard) in 418. By this stage, the western empire was reduced to Italy and Africa but with only a tenuous hold on western Illyricum, Gallia and Hispania.

==== Empress (417–450) ====
Roman Empire 420, with migratory pathways

Placidia was returned to Ravenna and, against her will, was married to the Constantius on 1 January 417 according to Olympiodorus of Thebes. Their first child was Justa Grata Honoria (Honoria), and a little more than a year later Valentinian on 4 July 419. In February 421, Honorius, who lacked an heir himself, reluctantly elevated Constantius augustus as Constantius III (r. 421–421), Galla Placidia as augusta by her husband and Honorius and Valentinian as nobilisimus, indicating he was destined for succession. These titles were not recognised by the eastern court and Constantius died within seven months in September 421.

Relations between Placidia and Honorius deteriorated, with their respective supporters clashing in the streets of Ravenna, leading to her moving her family to Constantinople in 422. She may have been banished by Honorius, with whom her relations were previously close, because according to Olympiodorus, Philostorgius, Prosper, and the Chronica Gallica of 452, gossip about the nature of their relationship that arose after Constantius's death caused them to quarrel. Galla Placidia involved herself in political and religious affairs, for instance supporting a candidate to the disputed see of Rome.

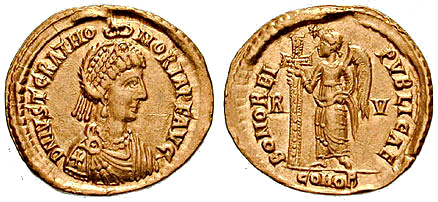
Solidus of Honoria marked: d·n· iust· grat· honoria p·f· aug· ("Our Lady Justa Grata Honoria, Pious Happy Augusta") The reverse is marked: bono reipublicae ("The Good of the Republic")

=== Fourth generation: Valentinian III and Honoria (423–455) ===
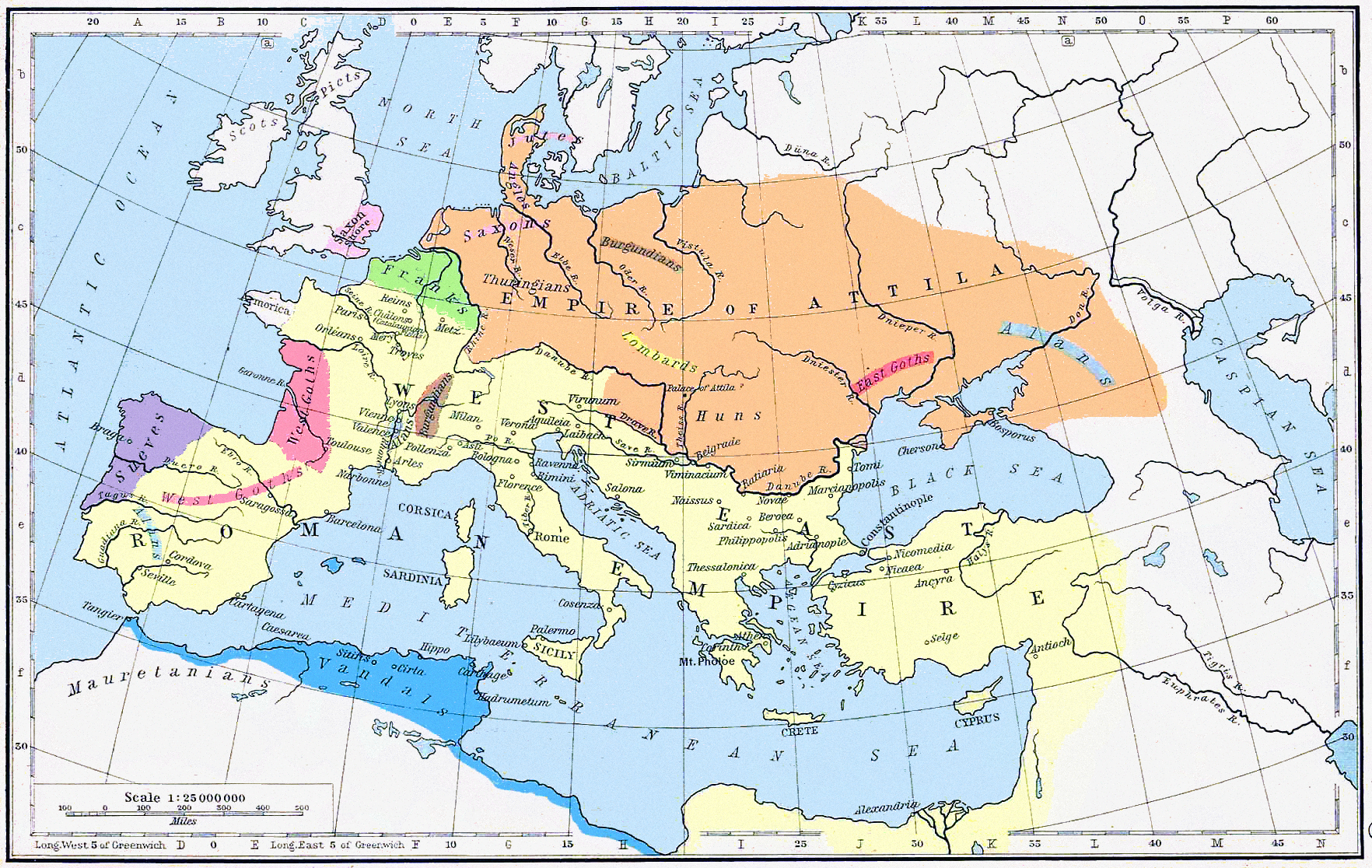
Empires of Attila and Roman Empire c. 450, with settlement areas of Germanic tribes within the Imperium Romanorum. Controlled areas in colour

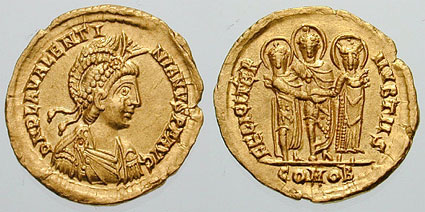
Solidus of Valentinian III celebrating an imperial marriage showing, Theodosius II (C), blessing the union of Valentinian (L) and Theodosius' daughter Licinia Eudoxia (R)

Honorius died in 423, leaving Galla Placidia as the only ruler in the west, though not recognised in the east. At the eastern court, Theodosius I's eldest son Arcadius (r. 383–408) had died in 408, and been succeeded by his son Theodosius II (r. 402–450), also a child emperor, but who was now 22, and who considered himself the sole ruler of the empire.

However, the vacuum was rapidly filled by the appearance of a usurper in Rome, the primicerius notariorum Joannes (r. 423–425), who declared himself as augustus in the west. Dynastic considerations then forced the eastern court to retrospectively recognise Constantius, Placidia and their six-year-old son, and to restore the Valentinianic dynasty in the west, in early 424. Theodosius elevated Valentinian to caesar on 23 October 424. The combined forces of Placidia and Theodosius invaded Italy in 425, capturing and executing Joannes. Valentinian was then proclaimed augusta on his first anniversary, as Valentinian III (r. 425–455) at Rome on 23 October 425, with Placidia as regent. Theodosius further strengthened dynastic relations across the empire by betrothing his three-year-old daughter Licinia Eudoxia to Valentinian. By this time the western sphere of influence was reduced to Italy and the economically strategic provinces of North Africa (see map in Heather (2000, p. 3)). With a six year old titular emperor, the real power lay with his mother and the three major military commanders, though these were locked in struggles against each other, from which Flavius Aetius emerged as the sole survivor by 433, appointing himself patricius. These struggles weakened central control of the empire, with frequent incursions of a number of neighbouring peoples. However, Aetius, having emerged as the sole military commander was able to reverse some of these losses in the late 430s, albeit temporarily. The fall of Carthago (Carthage) to the Vandals in 439 and subsequent invasion of Sicilia, rapidly followed by Hunnic invasions across the Danube in 441 precipitated another crisis. Much of the 440s was spent in a struggle to maintain control in Hispania and Gallia, while the progressive loss of territories and hence tax base, continued to weaken the central government in Ravenna.

==== Honoria and Attila (449–453) ====
Attila's invasion of Gaul 451 and Battle of Campus Mauriacus

Valentinian's older sister, Honoria, was given the title of augusta in 426, but provoked a major scandal when it was alleged she had conceived a child through an affair with Eugenius, her estate manager. The latter was promptly executed and Honoria incarcerated then betrothed to a Senator. This prompted her to call on Attila the Hunnic leader for assistance, offering herself and half of the western empire. Attila needed little encouragement to turn his attention westward from his Balkan stronghold. Following a diplomatic offensive based on this, Attila marched westwards along the Danube in early 451, crossing the Rhine at Mogontiacum (Mainz) and ravaging Belgica and northern Gallia as far south as Cenabum (Orleans). Aetius confronted him near what is now Châlons-en-Champagne at the Battle of Campus Mauriacus in late June or early July. Aetius prevailed, forcing Attila to fall back to Pannonia. The following year, Attila swept across Venetia and northern Italy, taking Aquileia, Patavium (Padua), Mantua, Verona and Brixia (Brescia). Aquileia was completely sacked, and Aetius was able to do little more than harry the invaders, until the eastern empire launched an offensive on Attila's flank, forcing him to once more withdraw, dying the following year (453). Attila's death then led to a disintegration of the Hunnic empire. One consequence of the elimination of the Hunnic threat was that Valentinian, now 34, had no further use for Aetius and assassinated him on or about 21 September 454, only to be killed himself by Aetius' bodyguards a few months later on 16 March 455. Valentinian having no male heirs, the dynasty, and dynastic rule in the west, ended.

Although Marcellinus Comes and Olympiodorus imply that Placidia had been stripped of her title by Honorius, she most likely retained her rank while resident at the eastern court. Placidia's influence gradually waned by the 430s as her son reached adulthood, her political failures and the rise of the patricius Flavius Aetius. She was active in religious patronage, building churches in Jerusalem, Ravenna and Rome. According to Agnellus and the Chronica Gallica of 452, Galla Placidia died on 25 November 450 and was buried in the S. Nazarius monasterium in Ravenna.

=== Fifth generation: Placidia and Eudocia (455-484) ===
==== Petronius, Palladius and Eudocia: The sack of Rome and captivity in Africa (455) ====
Valentinian III, having no male heirs, there was no incentive for the Eastern empire to intervene on his death. He did, however have two daughters, Eudocia (439–466/474) and Placidia (439–484), who represented the fifth and last generation to ascend the throne, though only briefly. On Valentinian's death, power was seized by the senator Petronius Maximus (r. 455–455), who had colluded with Valentinian in Aetius' death, the following day. As was customary, he immediately forced Valentinian's widow Licinia Eudoxia, who was the daughter of Theodosius II, to marry him in order to establish a dynastic legitimacy. This was unsuccessful, in that this succession was not recognised in the east. He furthered this ambition by appointing his son Palladius as caesar and then marrying him to Eudocia. Around this time her sister Placidia was married to Olybrius, a Roman senator of the distinguished Anicia gens. However Petronius Maximus' reign was short lived. The Empress Licinia Eudoxia sought revenge, summoning the Vandal king Gaiseric from Africa to her aid. Gaiseric then proceeded to sack Rome, kill Petronius (22 May 455) and carry off the Empress and her two daughters to Cartago. It is assumed that Palladius also died at this time. He then married Eudocia to his son Huneric. Petronius's death is considered to mark the final chapter of the Valentinianic dynasty. He and his successors, being referred to as the "shadow" emperors of the last years of the western empire, their reigns being so short, and because real power lay with the military commanders.

==== Shadow emperors: Avitus to Anthemius and escape to Constantinople (455–472) ====
On Petronius' death, his magister militum praesentalis (Master of Soldiers in the Presence) Avitus (r. 455–456), then in Gallia seeking the loyalty of the Visgoths, was proclaimed augustus in Arles on or about 10 July, traveling to Rome in September. His attempts to improve Roman control in Gallia, by giving more influence to Gallo-Romans was not popular and by 456 was faced by open revolt and was deposed by his magister militum, Ricimer at the Battle of Placentia (Piacenza) in October. After a brief interregnum, Majorian (r. 456–461), the comes domesticorum (Count of the Domestics) was acclaimed in December in Ravenna, this time with eastern acquiescence. Majorian had some success in stabilising the western empire but in turn was also deposed by Ricimer in 461, installing Severus III (r. 461–465) in his stead. By the time of Severus's death, Ricimer was working closely with the east, this time installing Anthemius (r. 467–472), who had married Marcia Euphemia, daughter of Marcian (r. 450–457), the eastern emperor. Anthemius was also related to Ricimer, through his daughter Alypia who had married the latter. At this time, the empire was becoming increasingly irrelevant, existing more in name than in reality, while groups such as the Franks were becoming increasingly important. Meanwhile, Marcian had unsuccessfully tried to get Gaiseric to let the imperial family come to Constantinople, and contemplated military intervention in 456. Geiseric however did negotiate their return with Marcian's successor, Leo I (r. 457–474), Olybrius having travelled to Cartago. Eudocia, remained with her husband and son, Hilderic a later Vandal king, in Africa, but Licinia and Placidia joined the eastern court.

==== Anthemius to Olybrius and Placidia (472) ====
In 472, relations between Ricimer, now the effective power in the empire, and Anthemius had deteriorated to the extent that Ricimer declared Olybrius (r. 472), who had been considered as emperor in the past, augustus in April. This placed the second of Valentinian III's daughters on the throne. Anthemius was finally deposed and killed on 11 July. Ricimer died shortly after this on 18 August, followed by Olybrius on 2 November, after only a few months as emperor. This ended the era of Valentinian dynasts. But through Placidia, Valentinian's descendants continued to be a part of the Roman nobility in Constantinople until the end of the 6th century.

=== Epilogue: The fall of the Western Empire (472-480) ===
Roman Empire 476, with migratory pathways. Dalmatia was annexed to Italy in 480

With the death of Olybrius, a number of short-lived emperors oversaw the collapse of the empire. Olybrius' death was followed by a further interregnum until Glycerius (r. 473–474), the comes domesticorum, was proclaimed on 3 March 474. This was not accepted by the eastern court, Leo I dispatching Julius Nepos (r. 474–475) to depose him, which he did in June, assuming power himself. His reign was equally brief, facing a rebellion by his own magister militum, Orestes, forcing Nepos to flee from Ravenna to Dalmatia in August 475, from where he attempted to rule in Salona. Meanwhile, Orestes installed his own son Romulus Augustulus (Note: Augustulus, i.e "little augustus") (r. 475–476), then 15, in Ravenna in October. By this time the effective empire had shrunk further considerably, and Orestes and Romulus Augustus faced a major threat from Odoacer, a barbarian soldier and leader of the foederati in Italy. Odoacer advanced on Ravenna, killing Orestes at Placentia in August 476. The army then proclaimed Odoacer rex Italiae (King of Italy) who proceeded to Ravenna deposing Romulus Augustulus on 4 September. This effectively ended imperial rule in the west. The Senate symbolically sent the imperial regalia to the eastern court in recognition of this, and it was accepted, the eastern Emperor, Zeno treating Odoacer as the titular ruler of Italy, under the nominal reign of Nepos, until the latter's death in 480. With Nepos’ death, Odoacer annexed Dalmatia and Zeno became the sole Roman Emperor, of what was now a solely Eastern empire, later known by name Byzantine Empire, after the original settlement of Byzantium on which Constantinople was based. The western empire now being a series of rump European kingdoms.

== Family trees ==
VALENTINIANIC DYNASTY detailed family tree

Maximian emperor of the West; 286–305	Eutropia	Afranius Hannibalianus consul 292
1.Saint Helena	Constantius Chlorus emperor of the West; 305–306	2.Theodora
Fausta	Constantine I emperor of the Romans; 310–324; CONSTANTINIANS; 306–363	Julius Constantius ∞ Galla
Constantius II emperor of the Romans; 337–361 ∞ Faustina	Gratianus Funarius protector domesticus, tribune, comes	(2nd daughter) ∞ Justus governor of Picenum
Valens emperor of the East; 364–378 ∞ Albia Dominica	1.Marina Severa	Valentinian I (Note: Other children born to Valentinian I and Justina, include Justa and Grata) emperor of the West; 364–375	2.Justina (Note: Justina was previously married to Magnus Magnentius)	Magnentius usurper
1.Constantia; 361–383; m. 374	Valentinianus Galates consul	Gratian emperor of the West; 376–383 ∞ 2.Laeta 383	Valentinian II emperor of the West; 375–392	2.Galla (Note: Other children born to Theodosius and Galla, include Gratian and Joannes)	Theodosius I emperor of the Romans; 392–395; THEODOSIAN DYNASTY	1.Aelia Flaccilla
1.Athaulf king of Visigoths (Note: By whom, one son, Theodosius)	Galla Placidia	2.Constantius III emperor of the West; 421	Arcadius emperor of the East
Eparchius Avitus emperor of the West	Eparchia	2.Petronius Maximus emperor of the West	Licinia Eudoxia (daughter of Theodosius II)	1.Valentinian III emperor of the West; 425–455	Justa Grata Honoria augusta 439–c. 450 ∞ Bassus Herculanus
Agricola vir illustris	Ecdicius magister militum	2.Palladius; Caesar	Eudocia (439–466/474)	1.Huneric king of the Vandals	Placidia (439–484) ∞ Olybrius emperor of the West; 472
Hilderic king of the Vandals; 460–533	Anicia Juliana; 462–527 ∞ Areobindus Dagalaifus Areobindus consul

=== Simplified tree ===
Simplified Valentian family tree

Gratianus
Valens, Emp.	1)Marina Severa	Valentinian I, Emp.	2)Justina
Gratian, Emp.	Valentinian II, Emp.	2)Galla	Theodosius I, Emp.	1)Aelia Flaccilla	Serena	Stilicho
Constantius III, Emp.	Galla Placidia	Aelia Eudoxia	Arcadius, Emp.	Pulcheria	Honorius, Emp.	Maria	Eucherius
Licinia Eudoxia	Valentinian III, Emp.	Aelia Pulcheria
Placidia	Olybrius, Emp.

== See also ==
- Roman Empire
  - History of the Roman Empire
  - Eastern Empire
  - Western Empire
- Byzantine Empire
  - Byzantine Empire under the Constantinian and Valentinianic dynasties
  - Byzantine Empire under the Theodosian dynasty
- Persecution of pagans in the late Roman Empire
  - Glossary of ancient Roman religion
- Structural history of the Roman military
  - Late Roman army
  - Gothic wars
- Constitution of the Late Roman Empire
- Roman Italy
- Roman provinces
- List of Roman imperial victory titles

== Bibliography ==
=== Books ===
==== General ====
- Abbott, Frank Frost (1901). A History and Description of Roman Political Institutions. Boston: Ginn.(Full text at Internet Archive)
- D’Amato, Raffaele; Negin, Andrey Evgenevich (2018). Roman Heavy Cavalry (1): Cataphractarii & Clibanarii, 1st Century BC–5th Century AD. Bloomsbury Publishing. ISBN 978-1-4728-3003-6.
- Beck, Hans; Duplá, Antonio; Jehne, Martin; et al., eds. (2011). Consuls and Res Publica: Holding High Office in the Roman Republic. Cambridge University Press. ISBN 978-1-139-49719-0.
- Bruun, Christer; Edmondson, Jonathan, eds. (2014). The Oxford Handbook of Roman Epigraphy. Oxford University Press. ISBN 978-0-19-971442-1.
- Dench, Emma (2018). Empire and Political Cultures in the Roman World. Cambridge University Press. ISBN 978-0-521-81072-2.
- Erdkamp, Paul, ed. (2011). A Companion to the Roman Army. Blackwell Companions to the Ancient World. John Wiley & Sons. ISBN 978-1-4443-9376-7.
- Frank, Richard Ira (1969). Scholae Palatinae: The Palace Guards of the Later Roman Empire. American Academy.(Full text available on loan at Internet Archive)
- Hornblower, Simon; Spawforth, Antony; Eidinow, Esther, eds. (2014) [1998]. The Oxford Companion to Classical Civilization (2nd ed.). Oxford University Press. ISBN 978-0-19-870677-9.
  - ebook version
- Humphries, Mark (2019). "Family, Dynasty, and the Construction of Legitimacy from Augustus to the Theodosians". In Tougher, Shaun (ed.). The Emperor in the Byzantine World: Papers from the Forty-Seventh Spring Symposium of Byzantine Studies. Taylor & Francis. pp. 13–27. ISBN 978-0-429-59046-7.
- Kienast, Dietmar; Eck, Werner; Heil, Matthäus (2017) [1990]. Römische Kaisertabelle: Grundzüge einer römischen Kaiserchronologie (in German) (6 ed.). Darmstadt: Wissenschaftliche Buchgesellschaft. ISBN 978-3-534-26724-8.(excerpts at)
- Kuiper, Kathleen, ed. (2010). Ancient Rome: From Romulus and Remus to the Visigoth Invasion. Britannica Guide to Ancient Civilizations. The Rosen Publishing Group, Inc. ISBN 978-1-61530-107-2.(Also available here on Academia)
- Kulikowski, Michael (2006). Rome's Gothic Wars: From the Third Century to Alaric. Cambridge University Press. ISBN 978-1-139-45809-2.
- Potter, David S., ed. (2009). A Companion to the Roman Empire. Blackwell Companions to the Ancient World. John Wiley & Sons. ISBN 978-1-4051-9918-6.
- Shaw, Brent D. (2011). Sacred Violence: African Christians and Sectarian Hatred in the Age of Augustine. Cambridge University Press. ISBN 978-0-521-19605-5.
- Vagalinski, Liudmil Ferdinandov; Sharankov, Nicolay; Torbatov, Sergey (2012). The Lower Danube Roman Limes (1st - 6th C. AD). Sofia: National Archaeological Institute and Museum, Bulgarian Academy of Sciences. ISBN 978-954-9472-16-5. (excerpts)
- Ward, Allen M.; Heichelheim, Fritz M.; Yeo, Cedric A. (2016) [2003]. History of the Roman People (6th ed.). Routledge. ISBN 978-1-315-51120-7.

==== Late empire ====
- Bagnall, Roger S.; et al. (1987). Consuls of the Later Roman Empire. Monograph 36. American Philological Association. ISBN 978-1-55540-099-6.(Available here at Leiden University)
  - Burgess, R. W. (1989). "Consuls and Consular Dating in the Later Roman Empire". Phoenix (Review). 43 (2): 143–157. doi:10.2307/1088213. JSTOR 1088213.
- Bury, J B (2018) [1910]. The Constitution of the Later Roman Empire. CUP Archive. GGKEY:1LPTHZ0BA4T.(Additional excerpts)(Full text at Internet Archive)
- — (1958) [1923]. History of the Later Roman Empire: From the Death of Theodosius I to the Death of Justinian, Volume 1. Mineola, New York: Dover Publications. OCLC 41478187.
- Cambridge Ancient History
  - Cameron, Averil; Garnsey, Peter, eds. (1998). The Cambridge Ancient History XIII: The Late Empire, A.D. 337–425. Cambridge University Press. ISBN 978-0-521-30200-5.
  - Cameron, Averil; Ward-Perkins, Bryan; Whitby, Michael, eds. (2000). The Cambridge Ancient History XIV: Late antiquity. Empire and successors, A.D. 425–600. Cambridge University Press. ISBN 978-0-521-32591-2.
- Cameron, Averil (1993). The Later Roman Empire, AD 284-430. Harvard University Press. ISBN 978-0-674-51194-1.
- Conant, Jonathan (2012). Staying Roman: Conquest and Identity in Africa and the Mediterranean, 439-700. Cambridge University Press. ISBN 978-0-521-19697-0.
- Dijkstra, Roald; Poppel, Sanne van; Slootjes, Daniëlle, eds. (2015). East and West in the Roman Empire of the Fourth Century: An End to Unity?. Brill Publishing Open Access. ISBN 978-90-04-29192-8. JSTOR 10.1163/j.ctt1w8h14q.
- Drinkwater, John; Elton, Hugh, eds. (2002) [1992]. Fifth-Century Gaul: A Crisis of Identity?. Cambridge University Press. ISBN 978-0-521-52933-4.
- Elton, Hugh (2018). The Roman Empire in Late Antiquity: A Political and Military History. Cambridge University Press. ISBN 978-0-521-89931-4.
- Grig, Lucy; Kelly, Gavin (2015). Two Romes: Rome and Constantinople in Late Antiquity. Oxford University Press. ISBN 978-0-19-024108-7.
- Heather, Peter (2007). The Fall of the Roman Empire: A New History of Rome and the Barbarians. Oxford University Press, USA. ISBN 978-0-19-532541-6.
  - e book version
- Hebblewhite, Mark (2016). The Emperor and the Army in the Later Roman Empire, AD 235-395. Taylor & Francis. ISBN 978-1-317-03430-8.
- — (2020). Ravenna: Capital of Empire, Crucible of Europe. Princeton University Press. ISBN 978-0-691-20197-9.
  - e book version, additional excerpts
- Johnson, Scott Fitzgerald, ed. (2012). The Oxford Handbook of Late Antiquity. OUP USA. ISBN 978-0-19-533693-1.
  - e book version
- Jones, Arnold Hugh Martin (1986) [1964]. The Later Roman Empire, 284-602: A Social Economic and Administrative Survey. 2 vols. Taylor & Francis. ISBN 978-0-8018-3354-0.
- Frakes, Robert M (2006). "The dynasty of Constantine down to 363". In Lenski, Noel Emmanuel (ed.). The Cambridge Companion to the Age of Constantine. Cambridge University Press. pp. 91–108. ISBN 978-0-521-52157-4.
- Jones, Martindale & Morris. The Prosopography of the Later Roman Empire 3 vols. Cambridge University Press.(see Prosopography of the Later Roman Empire PLRE)
  - Jones, Arnold Hugh Martin; Martindale, J. R.; Morris, John, eds. (1971). Volume 1, AD 260-395. Cambridge University Press. ISBN 978-0-521-07233-5.
- Maas, Michael (2005). The Cambridge Companion to the Age of Justinian. Cambridge University Press. ISBN 978-1-139-82687-7.
- Maas, Michael (2015). The Cambridge Companion to the Age of Attila. Cambridge University Press. ISBN 978-1-107-02175-4.
  - Martindale, J. R., ed. (1980). Volume 2, AD 395-527. Cambridge University Press. ISBN 978-0-521-20159-9.
- Kulikowski, Michael (2019). The Tragedy of Empire: From Constantine to the Destruction of Roman Italy. Harvard University Press. ISBN 978-0-674-66013-7.Additional excerpts
- Lee, A. D. (2013). From Rome to Byzantium AD 363 to 565. Edinburgh University Press. ISBN 978-0-7486-6835-9.
- McLynn, Neil B. (2014) [1994]. Ambrose of Milan: Church and Court in a Christian Capital. University of California Press. ISBN 978-0-520-28388-6.
- Ostrogorski, Georgije (1969) [1952]. Geschichte des byzantinische Staates [History of the Byzantine State]. trans. from German Joan Hussey (revised ed.). Rutgers University Press. ISBN 978-0-8135-1198-6.(also available for loan at Internet Archive)
- Wienand, Johannes, ed. (2015). Contested Monarchy: Integrating the Roman Empire in the Fourth Century AD. Oxford University Press. doi:10.1093/oso/9780199768998.001.0001. ISBN 978-0-19-976899-8.

==== Valentiniani ====
- Errington, Robert Malcolm (2006). Roman Imperial Policy from Julian to Theodosius. University of North Carolina Press. ISBN 978-0-8078-3038-3.
  - Seager, Robin (December 2006). "Roman Imperial Policy from Julian to Theodosius". Bryn Mawr Classical Review (Review).
- Hughes, Ian (2013). Imperial Brothers: Valentinian, Valens and the Disaster at Adrianople. Pen and Sword. ISBN 978-1-4738-2863-6.Additional excerpts
- Messana, Vincenzo (1999). La politica religiosa di Graziano (in Italian). G. Bretschneider. ISBN 9788876891564.
  - Humphries, Mark (October 2005). "Gratian's Religious Policies" (PDF). The Classical Review (Review). 55 (2): 647–648. doi:10.1093/clrevj/bni352.
- McEvoy, Meaghan (2013). Child Emperor Rule in the Late Roman West, AD 367-455. OUP. ISBN 978-0-19-966481-8.
  - ebook version

Galla Placidia

- Atkinson, Kenneth (2020). Empress Galla Placidia and the Fall of the Roman Empire. McFarland. ISBN 978-1-4766-3985-7.
  - ebook version
- Oost, Stewart Irvin (1968). Galla Placidia Augusta. A Biographical Essay. University of Chicago Press. ISBN 978-0-226-63050-2.
- Salisbury, Joyce E. (2015). Rome's Christian Empress: Galla Placidia Rules at the Twilight of the Empire. JHU Press. ISBN 978-1-4214-1700-4.
  - ebook version
- Sirago, Vito Antonio (1996) [1961]. Galla Placidia: la nobilissima (392-450) (in Italian) (revised ed.). Editoriale Jaca Book. ISBN 978-88-16-43501-8.
  - Millar, F. G. B. (1963). "Galla Placidia and Western Politics - V. A. Sirago: Galla Placidia e la trasformazione politica dell' Occidente". The Classical Review (review). 13 (2): 210–211. doi:10.1017/S0009840X00215576. S2CID 246880604.
- Sivan, Hagith (2011). Galla Placidia: The Last Roman Empress. OUP. ISBN 978-0-19-537912-9.

==== Theodosiani ====
- Doyle, Chris (2018). Honorius: The Fight for the Roman West AD 395-423. Taylor & Francis. ISBN 978-1-317-27807-8.
- Hebblewhite, Mark (2020). Theodosius and the Limits of Empire. Taylor & Francis. ISBN 978-1-351-59476-9.
- Kelly, Christopher, ed. (2013). Theodosius II: Rethinking the Roman Empire in Late Antiquity. Cambridge Classical Studies. Cambridge University Press. ISBN 978-1-107-03858-5.
- Williams, Stephen; Friell, Gerard (1994). Theodosius: The Empire at Bay. Yale University Press. ISBN 978-0-300-07447-5.(also available (limited loan) at Internet Archive)
  - e book version

==== Women in the Roman Empire ====
- Burns, Jasper (2006). Great Women of Imperial Rome: Mothers and Wives of the Caesars. Routledge. ISBN 978-1-134-13184-6.(Also available here on Academia)
  - ebook version
- Freisenbruch, Annelise (2010). Caesars' Wives: Sex, Power, and Politics in the Roman Empire. Simon and Schuster. ISBN 978-1-4165-8357-8.
- Herrin, Judith (2013). Unrivalled Influence: Women and Empire in Byzantium. Princeton University Press. ISBN 978-0-691-15321-6.
- Holum, Kenneth G. (1982). Theodosian Empresses: Women and Imperial Dominion in Late Antiquity. University of California Press. ISBN 978-0-520-06801-8.
  - e book version

==== Historical sources ====
- Seeck, Otto, ed. (1876). Notitia dignitatum: accedunt Notitia urbis Constantinopolitanae et laterculi prouinciarum. Berolinum: apud Weidmannos.
- Claudianus, Claudius (1922). Claudian Volume I: Panegyric on Probinus and Olybrius. Against Rufinus 1 and 2. War against Gildo. Against Eutropius 1 and 2. Fescennine Verses on the Marriage of Honorius. Epithalamium of Honorius and Maria. Panegyrics on the Third and Fourth Consulships of Honorius. Pane. Loeb Classical Library. trans. M. Platnauer. Harvard University Press. ISBN 978-0-674-99150-7.
- — (1922a). Claudian Volume II: On Stilicho's Consulship 2-3. Panegyric on the Sixth Consulship of Honorius. The Gothic War. Shorter Poems. Rape of Proserpina. Loeb Classical Library. trans. M. Platnauer. Harvard University Press. ISBN 978-0-674-99151-4.
- Marcellinus, Ammianus (2004) [1986]. Wallace-Hadrill (ed.). The Later Roman Empire: (a.D. 354-378). trans. Walter Hamilton. Penguin Books Limited. ISBN 978-0-14-192150-1.(Full text at Internet Archive, and also at Wikisource)
  - Boeft, Jan den; Drijvers, Jan Willem; Hengst, Daniël den; Teitler, H C (2009). Philological and Historical Commentary on Ammianus Marcellinus. Leiden: Brill. ISBN 978-90-04-18037-6.
  - Boeft, Jan den; Drijvers, Jan Willem; Hengst, Daniël den; Teitler, Hans C. (2007). Ammianus after Julian: The Reign of Valentinian and Valens in Books 26 - 31 of the Res Gestae. Brill. ISBN 978-90-474-2151-1.
- Zosimus (2017). Nova historia [New History]. trans. Ronald T Ridley. Leyden: Brill. ISBN 978-90-04-34458-7.

Anthologies

- Michael Maas (2010). Readings in Late Antiquity: A Sourcebook. Routledge. ISBN 978-0-415-47336-1.
- Rosenwein, Barbara H., ed. (2018). Reading the Middle Ages Volume I: From c.300 to c.1150. University of Toronto Press, Higher Education Division. ISBN 978-1-4426-3679-8.

=== Theses ===
- Bendle, Christopher Stephen (2020). The Office of Magister Militum in the 4th Century CE: A Study into the Political and Military History of the Later Roman Empire (MA thesis). University of Melbourne.
- King, JaShong (2017). The Making of an Emperor: Categorizing Power and Political Interests in Late Roman Imperial Accessions (284 CE – 610 CE) (MA thesis). University of Ottawa.
- Laisathit, Pasoot (2017). The Office of Agentes in Rebus in the later Roman Empire (c. 4–7) (MSc thesis). School of History, Classics and Archaeology, University of Edinburgh.
- Langa, Lesley A. (2006). Political Face of Late Roman Empresses: Christian Symbols on Coins from the Late Fourth and Early Fifth Centuries (MA thesis). Tallahassee, Florida: Department of Art History, Florida State University.
- Lawrence, Thomas Christopher (2013). Crisis of Legitimacy: Honorius, Galla Placidia, and the Struggles for Control of the Western Roman Empire, 405-425 C.E. for Control (PhD thesis). University of Tennessee, Knoxville.
- Nilsson, Carina Marie (2011). The empress in late antiquity and the Roman origins of the imperial feminine (MA thesis). Department of History, Simon Fraser University.
- Shaw, M. K. (2010). Imperial legitimacy in the Roman Empire of the third century : AD 193-337 (MA thesis). University of Tasmania.
- Türel, Tunç (2016). Towards the end of an empire: Rome in the west and Attila (425-455 AD) (PDF) (MA thesis). Ankara: Department of History, Hacettepe University.
- Washington, Belinda (2015). The roles of imperial women in the Later Roman Empire (AD 306-455) (PhD thesis). University of Edinburgh.

=== Encyclopedias and dictionaries ===
- Badian, E (22 October 2020). The reign of Valentinian and Valens. Encyclopædia Britannica.
- Bohec, Yann Le; Brizzi, Giovanni, eds. (2014). The Encyclopedia of the Roman Army 3 vols. Wiley Blackwell. ISBN 978-1-118-31814-0. (ERA)
- Vauchez, André; Dobson, Richard Barrie; Lapidge, Michael (2000). Encyclopedia of the Middle Ages 2 vols. Fitzroy Dearborn Publishers. ISBN 978-1-57958-282-1.(Published online by Oxford Reference, 2000 (subscription required))
- Bunson, Matthew (2002) [1994]. Encyclopedia of the Roman Empire (Revised ed.). Infobase Publishing. ISBN 978-1-4381-1027-1.(see Encyclopedia of the Roman Empire, also available here on Academia)
- Crabben, Jan van der, ed. (2020). Ancient History Encyclopedia.(see World History Encyclopedia)
- Bagnall, Roger S; Brodersen, Kai; Champion, Craige B; Erskine, Andrew; Huebner, Sabine R, eds. (2020) [2013]. The Encyclopedia of Ancient History. Wiley. doi:10.1002/9781444338386. hdl:1808/11108. ISBN 9781405179355.
- Hornblower, Simon; Spawforth, Antony; Eidinow, Esther, eds. (2012) [1949]. The Oxford Classical Dictionary (4th ed.). OUP. ISBN 978-0-19-954556-8.(see The Oxford Classical Dictionary)
- Kazhdan, Aleksandr Petrovich, ed. (1991). The Oxford Dictionary of Byzantium 3 vols. Oxford University Press. ISBN 978-0-19-504652-6.
- Nicholson, Oliver, ed. (2018). The Oxford Dictionary of Late Antiquity 2 vols. Oxford: OUP. ISBN 978-0-19-256246-3.(see The Oxford Dictionary of Late Antiquity ODLA)
- Dictionary of Greek and Roman Biography and Mythology 3 vols.
  - Smith, William, ed. (1850). Dictionary of Greek and Roman Biography and Mythology I: Abaeus-Dysponteus. London: Taylor and Walton.
  - —, ed. (1846). Dictionary of Greek and Roman Biography and Mythology II: Earinus-Nyx. Taylor and Walton.

=== Chapters ===
- Börm, Henning (2015). Born to be Emperor: The Principle of succession and the Roman monarchy. pp. 239–265., in Wienand (2015)
- Drijvers, Jan Willem (2015). The divisio regni of 364: The end of unity?. pp. 82–98., in Dijkstra et al (2015)
- Inglebert, Hervé (2012). Late antique conceptions of late antiquity. pp. 3–30., in Johnson (2012)
- Mommaerts, T S; Kelley, D H (2002). The Anicii of Gaul and Rome. pp. 111–121., in Drinkwater & Elton (2002)
- Varbanov, Varbin. Barbarian Invasions in the Roman Provinces of Lower Moesia and Thrace in the mid- Third Century and the Coin Hoards from that Period. pp. 289–310., in Vagalinski (2012)

==== CAH ====
Volume 13

- Blockley, R. C. (1998). The dynasty of Theodosius. pp. 111–137., in Cameron et al (1998)
- Curran, John (1998). From Jovian to Theodosius. pp. 78–110., in Cameron et al (1998)
- Kelly, Christopher (1998). Emperors, government and bureaucracy. pp. 138–183., in Cameron et al (1998)
- Lee, A. D. (1998). The Army. pp. 211–237., in Cameron et al (1998)
- Marcone, Arnaldo (1998). Late Roman social relations. pp. 338–370., in Cameron et al (1998)

Volume 14

- Barnish, Sam (2000). Government and administration. pp. 164–106., in Cameron et al (2000)
- Collins, Roger (2000). The western kingdoms. pp. 112–134., in Cameron et al (2000)
- Heather, Peter (2000). The Western Empire, 425–76. pp. 1–32., in Cameron et al (2000)
- Lee, A. D. (2000). The eastern empire: Theodosius to Anastasius. pp. 33–62., in Cameron et al (2000)

==== ODLA ====
- Bond, Sarah E (2018). "Valentinian II". Valentinian II (371–92). Vol. 2. Oxford University Press. p. 1547. ISBN 978-0-19-866277-8., in Nicholson (2018)
- Bond, Sarah E; Darley, Rebecca (2018b). "Valentinian I". Valentinian I (321–75). Vol. 2. Oxford University Press. pp. 1546–1547. ISBN 978-0-19-866277-8., in Nicholson (2018)
- Bond, Sarah E; Darley, Rebecca (2018a). "Valens". Valens (328–78). Vol. 2. Oxford University Press. p. 1546. ISBN 978-0-19-866277-8., in Nicholson (2018)
- Bond, Sarah E; Nicholson, Oliver (2018). "Gratian". Gratian (359–83). Vol. 1. Oxford University Press. pp. 677–678. ISBN 978-0-19-866277-8., in Nicholson (2018)
- Harries, Jill (2018). Magnus Maximus. Vol. 2. Oxford University Press. ISBN 978-0-19-866277-8. in Nicholson (2018)
- Nathan, Geoffrey S (2018). "Galla Placidia, Aelia". Galla Placidia, Aelia (c. 388–450). Vol. 1. Oxford University Press. p. 637. ISBN 978-0-19-866277-8., in Nicholson (2018)
- Nicholson, Oliver (2018a). Pannonian emperors. Vol. 2. Oxford University Press. p. 637. ISBN 978-0-19-866277-8., in Nicholson (2018)

==== ERA ====
- Janniard, Sylvain (2014a). comitatenses., in Bohec & Brizzi (2014)
- Janniard, Sylvain (2014). domestici., in Bohec & Brizzi (2014)
- Janniard, Sylvain (2014c). Field Officers: Late Empire., in Bohec & Brizzi (2014)
- Janniard, Sylvain (2014b). limitanei., in Bohec & Brizzi (2014)

==== PLRE ====
- Jones (1971). Constantia 2. Vol. 1. p. 221., in Jones et al (1971)
- Martindale (1980a). Aelia Galla Placidia. Vol. 2. pp. 888–889., in Martindale (1980)

==== Römische Kaisertabelle ====
- Kienast, Dietmar (2017a). Constantius II. pp. 300–308., in Kienast et al (2017)
- Kienast, Dietmar (2017d). Valentinian I. pp. 313–315., in Kienast et al (2017)
- Kienast, Dietmar (2017e). Valens. pp. 316–318., in Kienast et al (2017)
- Kienast, Dietmar (2017c). Gratian. pp. 319–320., in Kienast et al (2017)
- Kienast, Dietmar (2017f). Valentinian II. pp. 321–322., in Kienast et al (2017)
- Kienast, Dietmar (2017b). Theodosius I. pp. 323–326., in Kienast et al (2017)

=== Articles ===
- Azarpay, Guitty (1981). "Bishapur VI: An Artistic Record of an Armeno-Persian Alliance in the Fourth Century". Artibus Asiae. 43 (3): 171–189. doi:10.2307/3249834. JSTOR 3249834.
- Barnes, Timothy D. (2002). "Valentinian, Auxentius and Ambrose". Historia: Zeitschrift für Alte Geschichte. 51 (2): 227–237. JSTOR 4436652.
- Boak, A.E.R. (1915). "The Roman Magistri in the Civil and Military Service of the Empire". Harvard Studies in Classical Philology. 26: 73–164. doi:10.2307/310606. JSTOR 310606.
- Bury, J. B. (1910). "Magistri Scriniorum, antigrafhs and referendarioi". Harvard Studies in Classical Philology. 21: 23. doi:10.2307/310502. JSTOR 310502.
- Cameron, Alan (2016). "Pontifex Maximus: from Augustus to Gratian – and Beyond" (PDF). Collegium: 139–159.
- Cameron, Averil (April 2016a). "Late antiquity and Byzantium: an identity problem". Byzantine and Modern Greek Studies. 40 (1): 27–37. doi:10.1017/byz.2015.4.
- — (2019). "Byzantium now – contested territory or excluded middle?". Scandinavian Journal of Byzantine and Modern Greek Studies. 5: 91–111.
- Clover, Frank M. (1978). "The Family and Early Career of Anicius Olybrius". Historia: Zeitschrift für Alte Geschichte. 27 (1): 169–196. JSTOR 4435589.
- Dijkstra, Roald; Espelo, Dorine Van (2017). "Anchoring Pontifical Authority: A Reconsideration of the Papal Employment of the Title Pontifex Maximus". Journal of Religious History. 41 (3): 312–325. doi:10.1111/1467-9809.12400. hdl:2066/160382.
- Dunn, Geoffrey D. (9 February 2020). "Constantius III, Galla Placidia, and Libanius the Magician: Olympiodorus of Thebes and the Reconstruction of Imperial Politics in Ravenna in 421". Journal for Late Antique Religion and Culture. 14: 50–64. doi:10.18573/jlarc.113.
- Frend, W. H. C. (1992). "Pagans, Christians, and 'the Barbarian Conspiracy' of A. D. 367 in Roman Britain". Britannia. 23: 121–131. doi:10.2307/526106. JSTOR 526106. S2CID 162189776.
- Gillett, Andrew (2001). "Rome, Ravenna and the Last Western Emperors". Papers of the British School at Rome. 69: 131–167. doi:10.1017/S0068246200001781. JSTOR 40311008. S2CID 129373675.
- Gomez, Miguel Pablo Sancho (June 2015). "Constantine, Constans and the Comes Rei Militaris (306-350)". Proceedings of the XIII Symposium of Nis and Byzantium, Nis (Serbia): 477–487.
- Hennessy, Cecily (2016). "Patronage and Precedents: Galla Placidia's chapel in Ravenna and the Holy Apostles, Constantinople". Byzantinoslavica. LXXIV (1–2): 26–43.
- Herrin, Judith (2016). "Late antique origins of the 'Imperial Feminine'". Byzantinoslavica. LXXIV (1–2): 5–25.
- Hillner, Julia (January 2017). "A woman's place: imperial women in late antique Rome" (PDF). Antiquité Tardive. 25: 75–94. doi:10.1484/J.AT.5.114851.
- Icks, Martijn (1 November 2014). "The Inadequate Heirs of Theodosius. Ancestry, merit and divine blessing in the representation of Arcadius and Honorius". Millennium. 11 (1): 69–100. doi:10.1515/mill-2014-0105. S2CID 149397278.
- Johnson, Mark J. (1991). "On the Burial Places of the Valentinian Dynasty". Historia: Zeitschrift für Alte Geschichte. 40 (4): 501–506. JSTOR 4436217.
- Kulikowski, Michael (1 January 2016). "Henning Börm, Westrom. Von Honorius bis Justinian". Klio. 98 (1): 393–396. doi:10.1515/klio-2016-0033. S2CID 193005098.
- Landelle, Marc (1 January 2014). "The title magister militum in the 4th century AD". Antiquité Tardive. 22: 195–221. doi:10.1484/J.AT.5.103187.
- Leonard, Victoria (2019). "Galla Placidia as 'Human Gold': Consent and Autonomy in the Sack of Rome, CE 410". Gender & History. 31 (2): 334–352. doi:10.1111/1468-0424.12423. S2CID 155912929.
- Lunn-Rockliffe, Sophie (9 December 2010). "Commemorating the Usurper Magnus Maximus: Ekphrasis, Poetry, and History in Pacatus' Panegyric of Theodosius". Journal of Late Antiquity. 3 (2): 316–336. doi:10.1353/jla.2010.a404242.
- Madroñal, Raúl Serrano (January 2018). "Eudocia, hija de Valentiniano III". Habis (in Spanish). 49 (49): 189–202. doi:10.12795/Habis.2018.i49.14.
- Mathisen, Ralph (November 2009). "Provinciales, Gentiles, and Marriages between Romans and Barbarians in the Late Roman Empire". Journal of Roman Studies. 99: 140–155. doi:10.3815/007543509789745025. S2CID 154048776.
- McEvoy, Meaghan (November 2010). "Rome and the transformation of the imperial office in the late fourth–mid-fifth centuries AD". Papers of the British School at Rome. 78: 151–192. doi:10.1017/S0068246200000854.
- McEvoy, Meaghan (2016). "Constantia: The Last Constantinian". Antichthon. 50: 154–179. doi:10.1017/ann.2016.10. S2CID 151430655.
- Oost, Stewart Irvin (1965). "Some Problems in the History of Galla Placidia". Classical Philology. 60 (1): 1–10. doi:10.1086/364945. ISSN 0009-837X. JSTOR 268409. S2CID 161071560.
- Oost, Stewart Irvin (1968). "Galla Placidia and the Law". Classical Philology. 63 (2): 114–121. doi:10.1086/365346. JSTOR 269128. S2CID 159533344.
- Pawlak, Marcin (2005). "Theodosius, son of Athaulf and Galla Placidia". Eos (Wroclaw). 92 (2): 224–243.
- Rebenich, Stefan (1985). "Gratian, a Son of Theodosius, and the Birth of Galla Placidia". Historia: Zeitschrift für Alte Geschichte. 34 (3): 372–385. JSTOR 4435933.
- Schwarcz, Andreas (2003). "Marriage and Power Politics in the Fifth Century". Medieval Prosopography. 24: 35–43. JSTOR 44946414.
- Sinnigen, William G. (1959). "Two Branches of the Late Roman Secret Service". The American Journal of Philology. 80 (3): 238–254. doi:10.2307/291793. JSTOR 291793.
- Sheridan, James J. (1966). "The Altar of Victory - Paganism's Last Battle". L'Antiquité Classique. 35 (1): 186–206. doi:10.3406/antiq.1966.1466. JSTOR 41673351.
- Woods, David (1995). "A note concerning the early career of Valetinian I". Ancient Society. 26: 273–288. doi:10.2143/AS.26.0.632417. JSTOR 44079758.

=== Websites ===
- Fiorentino, Wesley (20 July 2017). "Magnus Maximus". World History Encyclopedia., in Crabben (2020)
- Lendering, Jona (10 August 2020). "Valentinian Dynasty". Livius.
  - Lendering, Jona (13 October 2020a). "Valentinian I".
- Vanderspoel, John (February 2014). "Stemmata of Imperial Dynasties". University of Calgary.

De Imperatoribus Romanis

- Weigel, Richard D (2020). "De Imperatoribus Romanis: An Online Encyclopedia of Roman Rulers and Their Families" [On the Rulers of Rome]. Collegium Editorum Doctissimorum Doctissimarumque, Loyola University, Chicago.
  - Mathisen, Ralph W (2 August 1997). "Petronius Maximus (17 March 455 – 22 May 455)".
  - Mathisen, Ralph W (18 March 1998). "Avitus (9/10 July 455 - 17/18 October 456)".
  - Mathisen, Ralph W (7 February 1998a). "Julius Valerius Maiorianus (18 February/28 December 457 - 2/7 August 461)".
  - Mathisen, Ralph W (2 August 1997a). "Libius Severus (461-465 A.D.)".
  - Mathisen, Ralph W (6 August 1996). "Licinia Eudoxia".
