= Parmularius (gladiator) =

Type of Ancient Roman gladiator

A parmularius was any of the various types of gladiator who used a small shield called a parma. Due to having a small shield parmularii would wear shin armour (ocreae) on both shins. This armour would be larger than the single ocrea worn on the right shin by a scutarius who carried a larger shield. Scutarii and parmularii are mentioned by Marcus Aurelius in his Meditations as two factions at the gladiator fights.

== See also ==
- List of Roman gladiator types
- Thraex
