= Scutarius =

Type of Ancient Roman gladiator

A scutarius in ancient Rome was any of the various types of gladiator who used a large shield called a samnite shield, which is named after another type of gladiator—a samnite. In Latin, the shield was called a scutum—where the name scutarius comes from. Due to having a large shield, scutarii would wear shin armour (ocrea) on their shield leg. This piece of armour would be smaller than the two ocreae worn by parmularii, who carried a smaller, though still somewhat large, shield. Scutarii also usually carried short swords and wore visored helmets. Scutarii and parmularii are mentioned by Marcus Aurelius in his Meditations as two factions at the gladiator fights—both as gladiators and people who supported those gladiators.

A scutarius could also refer to a guard armed with a scutum, as well as someone who made shields.

== See also ==
- List of Roman gladiator types
