= History of Roman-era Tunisia =

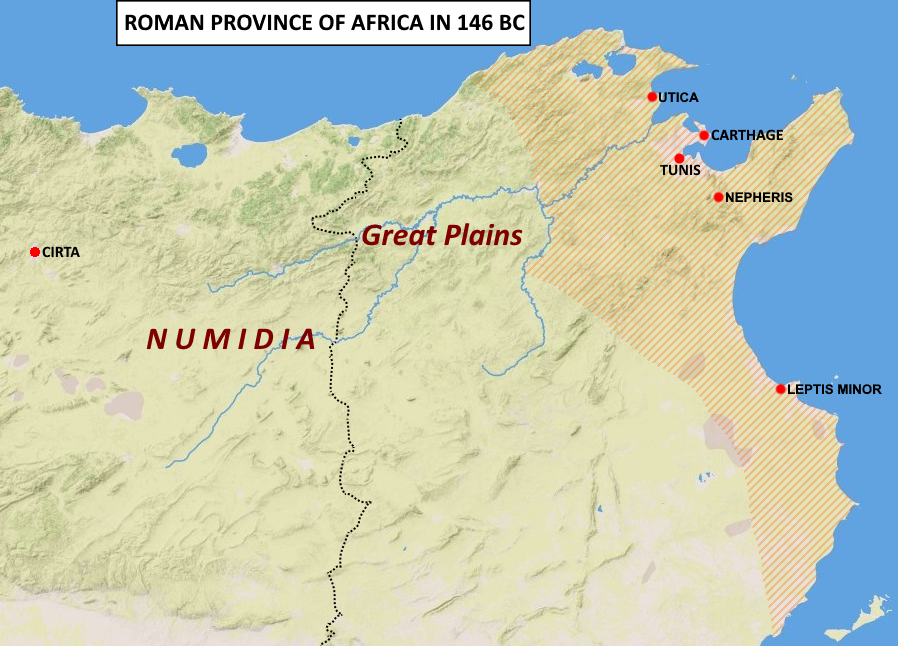
Roman Province of Africa in 146 BC

Roman Tunisia initially included the early ancient Roman province of Africa, later renamed Africa Vetus. As the Roman empire expanded, the present Tunisia also included part of the province of Africa Nova.

The Carthaginian (or Punic) empire was finally defeated by the Romans in the Third Punic War (149–146 BC) and there followed a period when nearby kingdoms of Berber kings were allied with Rome and eventually these neighbouring countries were annexed and reorganised. The city of Carthage was rebuilt, eventually becoming the capital of the province and the 3rd city of the Empire.

A long period of prosperity ensued based on rich agricultural exports, leading to a cosmopolitan culture.

Christianity became important in the province and provided Roman Catholicism with three Popes, as well as Augustine of Hippo.

The Vandals invaded Tunisia in 439 with the help of the Maurii (Libyans of Northwest Africa) and reigned over the province for nearly a century. Several Berber revolts occurred and some established self-rule at the periphery.

The Byzantine Empire eventually recaptured the area from the Vandals in 534, which endured until the Islamic conquest in 705.

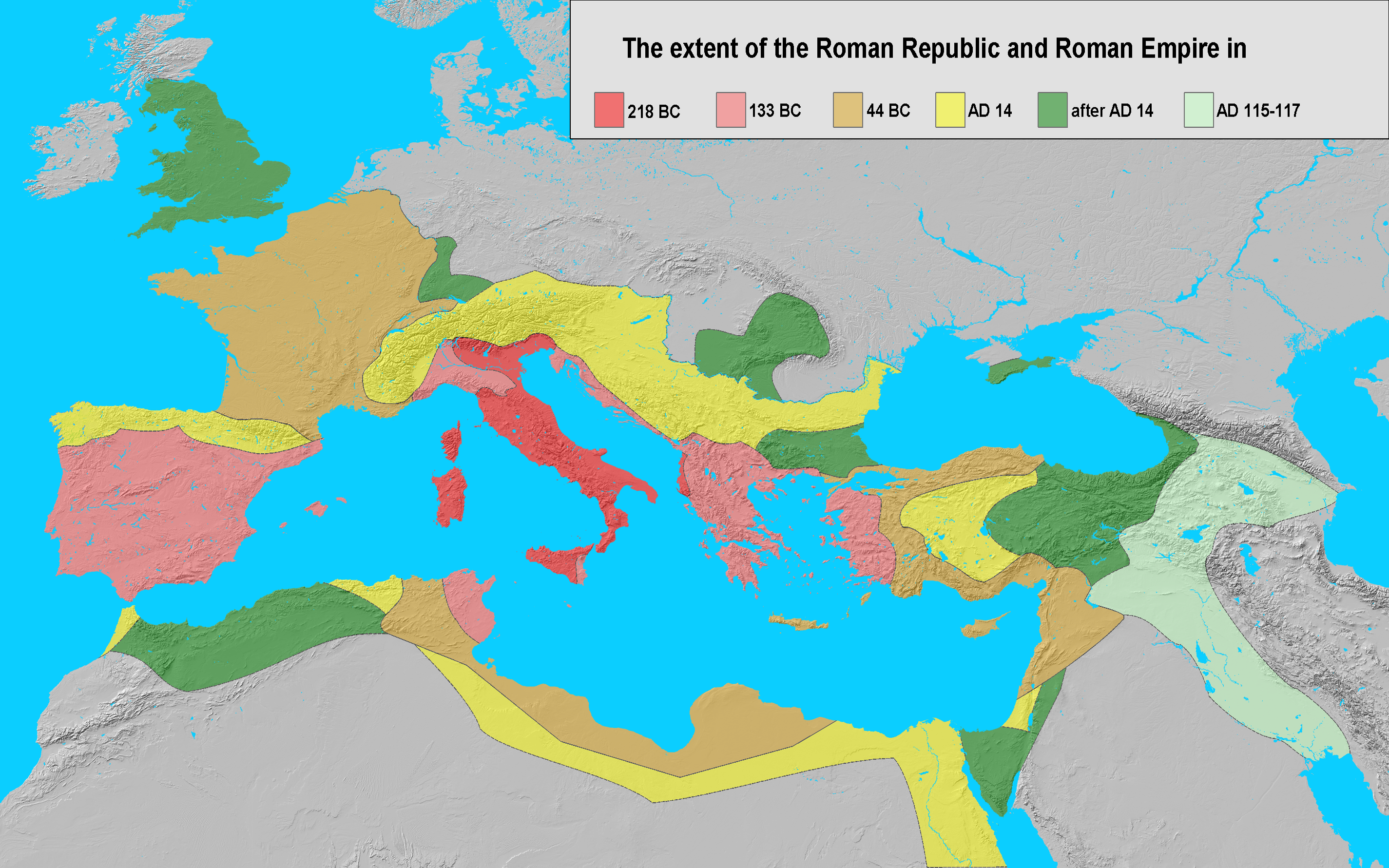
Roman Republic and the Roman Empire between 218 BC and 117 AD

== Roman Province of Africa ==
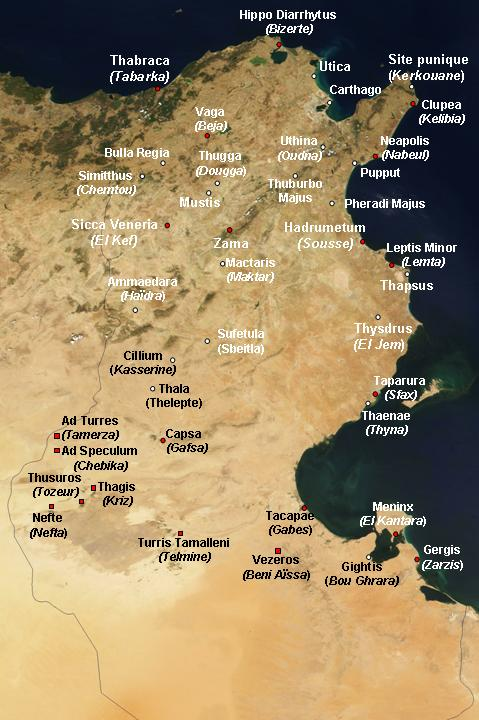
Roman cities of Tunisia

Following the defeat of Carthage in the Third Punic War (149–146), the Roman Republic destroyed the city and occupied the region with its rich and developed agricultural lands. At first the old city Utica, north of ruined Carthage, served as provincial capital.

The Roman Province of Africa was named after the Berbers for the Latins knew Afri as a local word for region's Berber people. The subsequent Arabic name for the region Ifriqiya evidently derives from the Roman province of Africa.

Adjacent lands to the west were allocated to their Berber allies, who continued to enjoy recognition as independent Berber kingdoms.

Roman Africa expanded to encompass modern Tunisia and all of northern modern Africa.

== City of Carthage ==
The rebuilding of the city of Carthage from the ashes began under Julius Caesar from 49 to 44 BC and continued under Augustus (63 BC – 14 AD). After Utica lost its privileged status in 54-46 BC, it became the capital of the new province of Africa Proconsularis from 27 BC and was home to a Roman praetor or proconsul.

Carthage flourished during the 1st, 2nd, and 3rd centuries.

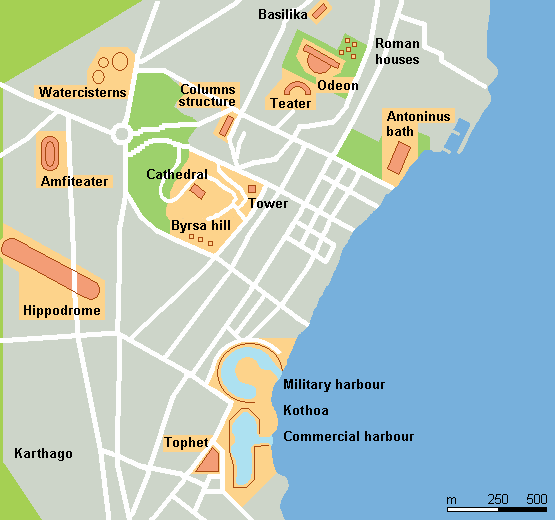
Roman Carthage, showing major civic institutions.

The province became known for fine mosaics with decorative and figurative designs by its resident artisans. Many large mosaics formed the floors of courtyards and rooms in villas within Carthage and the countryside, Beyond the city, many pre-existing Punic and Berber towns found fresh vigor and prosperity. Many new settlements were founded, especially in the rich and fertile Bagradas (modern Medjerda) river valley, north and northwest of Carthage. An aqueduct about 120 km in length, built by the Emperor Hadrian (r. 117–138), travels from a sanctuary high up Jbel Zaghouan overland about 70 km. to ancient Carthage. It was repaired and put into use during the 13th century, and again in modern times.

Carthage, and other cities in Roman Africa, contain the ruins or the remains of large structures dedicated to popular spectacles. The urban games performed there included the infamous blood sports, with gladiators who fought wild beasts or each other for the whim of the crowd. The Telegenii was one of the gladiator associations of the region. Although often of humble origins, a handsome, surviving gladiator might be "considered someone worthy of adulation by the young ladies of the audience."

Another city entertainment was the theater. The renowned Greek tragedies and comedies were staged, as well as contemporary Roman plays. Burlesque performances by mimes were popular. Much more costly and less vulgar were productions featuring pantomimes. The African writer Apuleius (c. 125 – c. 185) describes attending such a performance which he found impressive and delightful. An ancient epitaph here celebrates Vincentius, a popular pantomime (quoted in part):

He lives forever in the thoughts of the people... just, good and in his every relationship with each person irreproachable and sure. There was never a day when, during his dancing of the famous pieces, the whole theater was not captivated enough to reach the stars."

Peace and prosperity came to Carthage and Africa Province. Eventually Roman security forces began to be drawn from the local population. Here the Romans governed well enough that the Province became integrated into the economy and culture of the Empire, attracting immigrants. Its cosmopolitan, Latinizing, and diverse population enjoyed a reputation for its high standard of living. Carthage emerged near the top of major Imperial cities, behind only Alexandria and Rome.

== Agriculture ==
Rome occupied the lands of Carthage after its fall (146 BC) not to develop the harvest and benefit themselves, than to keep others off. Many Punic survivors of the defeated city, including owners of olive groves, vineyards, and farms, had "fled into the hinterland".

Public lands (ager publicus) passed to Rome by right of conquest, and many privately held lands also, those ruined or abandoned, or that had unpaid taxes. Some land good for agriculture, which had been used up to then only seasonally by Berber pastoralists, were also taken and distributed for planting. Accordingly many nomads (and small farmers, too) "were reduced to abject poverty or driven into the steppes and desert." Tacfarinas led a sustained Berber insurgency (17–24) against Rome; yet these rural tribal forces eventually met defeat. Thereafter the expansion of farming operations over the provincial lands did produce a higher yield. Yet Rome "never succeeded in keeping the nomads of the south and west permanently in check."

Great estates were formed by investors or the politically favored, or by emperors out of confiscated lands. Called latifundia, their farming operations were leased out to coloni often from Italia, who settled around the owner's 'main house'--thus forming a small agrarian town. The land was divided into "squares measuring 710 meters across". Many small farms were thus held by incoming Roman citizens or army veterans (the pagi), as well as by the prior owners, Punic and Berber. The quality and extent of large villas with comfort amenities, and other farm housing, found throughout Africa Province dating to this era, evince the wealth generated by agriculture. Working the land for its fruits was very rewarding.

Rich agricultural lands led the province to great prosperity. New hydraulic works increased the extent and intensity of the irrigation. Olives and grapes had for long been popular products commonly praised; however, the vineyards and orchards had been devastated during the last Punic war; also they were intentionally left to ruin because their produce competed with that of Roman Italia. Instead Africa Province acquired fame as the source of large quantities of fine wheat, widely exported—though chiefly to Rome. The ancient writers Strabo (64 BC – c. 21 AD), Pliny (23 – c. 79 AD), and Josephus (37 – c. 95 AD) praised the quality of African wheat. The Baradas river valley was acclaimed as productive as the Nile. Later, when Egypt began to supplant Africa Province as the supplier of wheat to Rome, the grape and the olive began reappearing again in the fields of the province, toward the end of the 1st century. St. Augustine (354–430) wrote that in Africa lamps fueled by olive oil burned well throughout the night, throwing light over the neighborhoods.

Evidence, from artifacts and the often large mosaics of great villas, indicates that one favorite sport of the agrarian elite was the hunt. Depicted are well-dressed sportsmen (in embroidered riding tunics with striped sleeves). Mounted on horseback they go cross-country in pursuit of illustrated game—here perhaps a jackal. Various wild birds are also shown as desired prey, to be gotten with traps. On the floor of a patio, a greyhound appears to be chasing a hare across the surface of its mosaic.

== Commerce and trade ==
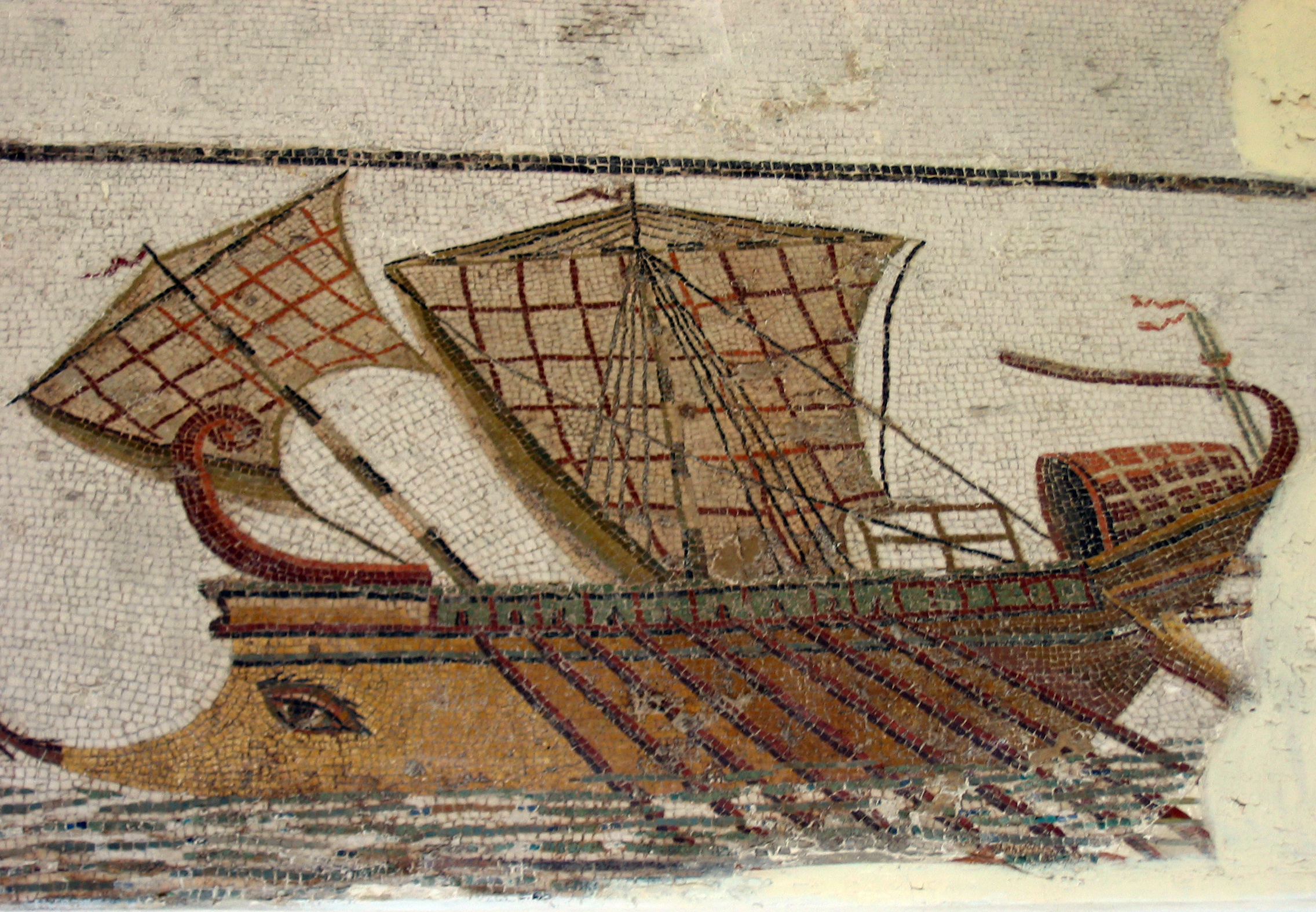
Mosaic of a Roman Trireme, likely from Africa Province.

Ceramics and pottery, skills developed and practiced for many centuries under the prior Phoenician-derived, urban culture, continued as an important industry, Both oil lamps and amphorae (containers with two handles) were produced in quantity. This pottery, of course, complemented the local production of olive oil, the amphorae being valuable not only as hard goods, but also useful for oil transportation locally and for export by ship. Numerous ancient oil presses have been found, producing from the harvested olive both oils for cooking and food, and oils for burning in lamps. Ceramics were also crafted into various statuettes of animals, humans, and gods, found in abundance in regional cemeteries of the period. Later, terra-cotta plaques showing biblical scenes were designed and made for the churches. Much of this industry was located in central Tunisia, e.g., in and around Thysdrus (modern El Djem), a drier area with less fertile agricultural lands, but ample in rich clay deposits.

The export of large amounts of wheat, and later of olive oils, and wines, required port facilities, indicated are (among others): Hippo Regius (modern Annaba), Hippo Diarrhytus (modern Bizerte), Utica, Carthage, Curubis (north of modern Nabeul), Missis, Hadrumentum, Gummi and Sullectum (both near modern Mahdia), Gightis (near Djerba isle), and Sabratha (near modern Tarabulus [Tripoli]). Marble and wood was shipped out of Thabraca (modern Tabarka). Ancient associations engaged in export shipping might form navicularii, collectively responsible for the commodities yet granted state privileges. Inland trade was carried on Roman roads, built both for the Roman legions and for commercial and private use. A major road led from Carthage southwest to Theveste (modern Tébessa) in the mountains; from there a road led southeast to Tacapes (modern Gabès) on the coast. Roads also followed the coastline. Buildings were erected occasionally along such highways for the convenience of traders with goods and other travelers.

Other products of Africa Province were shipped out. An ancient industry at Carthage involved cooking up a Mediterranean condiment called garum, a fish sauce made with herbs, an item of durable popularity. Rugs and wool clothing were fabricated, and leather goods. The royal purple dye, murex, first discovered and made famous by the Phoenicians, was locally produced. Marble and wood, as well as live mules, were also important export items.

Local trade and commerce was conducted at mundinae (fairs) in rural centers at set days of the week, much as it is today in souks. In villages and towns macella (provision markets) were established. In cities granted a charter the market was regulated by the municipal aediles (Roman market officials dating to the Roman Republic), who inspected the vendor's instruments for measuring and weighing. City trading was often done at the forum, or at stalls in covered areas, or at private shops.

Expeditions ventured south into the Sahara. Cornelius Balbus, Roman governor then at Utica, occupied in 19 BC. Gerama, desert capital of the Garamantes in the Fezzan (now west-central Libya). These Berber Garamantes had long-term, though unpredictable, breakable, contacts with the Mediterranean. Although Roman trade and other contact with the Berber Fezzan continued, on and off, raid or trade, extensive commercial traffic across the Sahara, directly to the more productive and populous lands south of the harsh deserts, had not yet developed; nor would it for many centuries.

== Latin culture and the Berbers ==
=== Assimilation ===
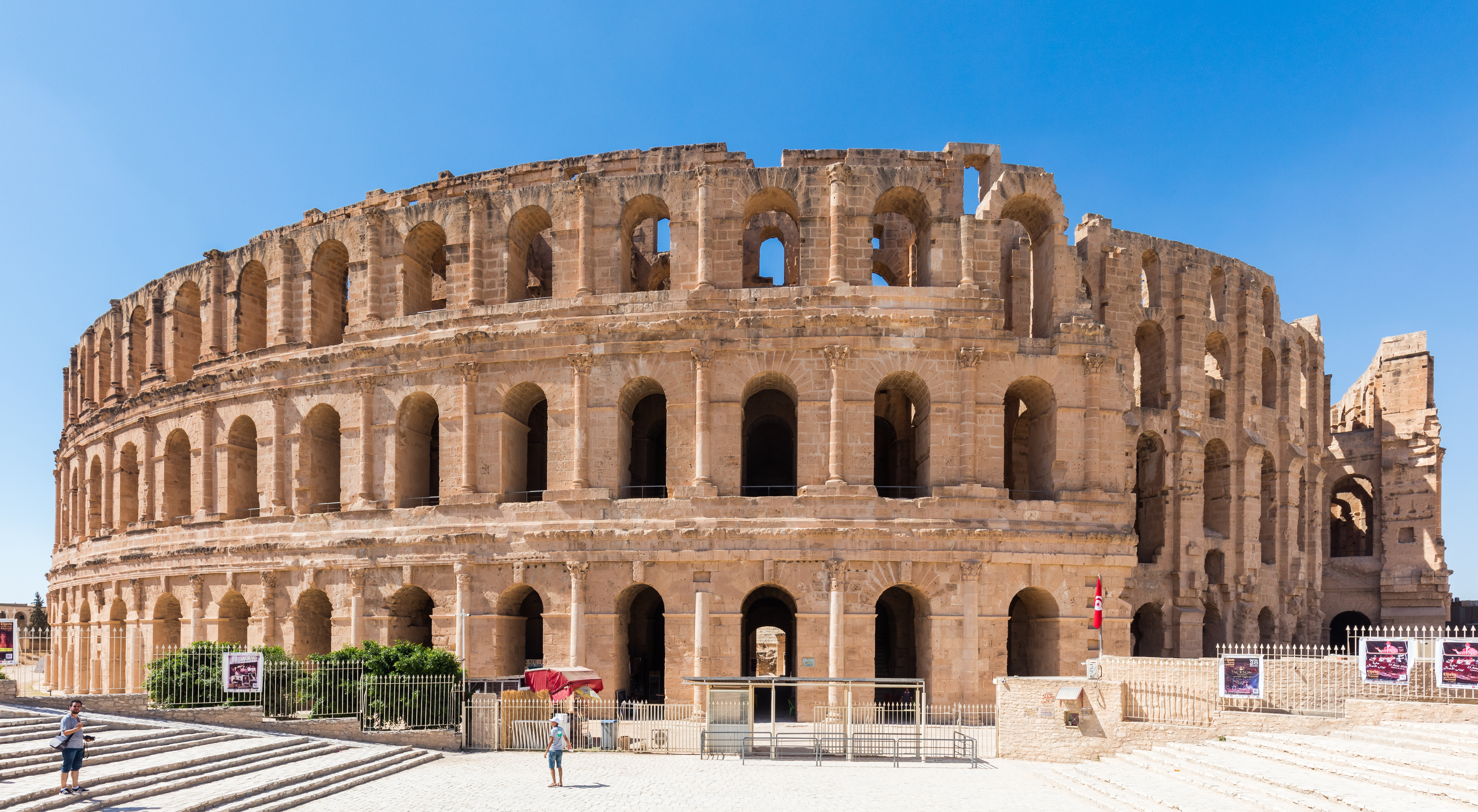
Amphitheatre of Thysdrus (modern El Djem)

People from all over the Empire began to migrate into Africa Province, merchants, traders, officials, most importantly veterans in early retirement who settled in Africa on farming plots promised for their military service. A sizable Latin speaking population developed that was multinational in background; they shared the region with those speaking Punic and Berber languages. Usually the business of the empire was conducted in Latin, so that a markedly bi- or tri-lingual situation developed. Imperial security forces began to be drawn from the local population, including the Berbers. The Romans apparently sounded the right notes, which facilitated general acceptance of their rule.

"What made the Berbers accept the Roman way of life all the more readily was that the Romans, though a colonizing people who captured their lands by the might of their arms, did not display any racial exclusiveness and were remarkably tolerant of Berber religious cults, be they indigenous or grafted from the Carthaginians. However, the Roman territory in Africa was unevenly penetrated by Roman culture. Pockets of non-Romanized Berbers continued to exist throughout the Roman period, even in such areas as eastern Tunisia and Numidia."

That the majority of the Berbers adjusted to the Roman world, of course, does not signify their full acceptance. Often the presence of cosmopolitan cultural symbols coexisted with the traditional local customs and beliefs, i.e., the Roman did not supplant the Berber, but merely augmented the prior Berber culture, often the Roman being on a more transient level of adherence.

=== Social strata ===
The success of the Berber Apuleius, however, may be regarded as more an exception than the rule. Evidently many native Berbers adopted to the Mediterranean-wide influences operating in the province, eventually intermarrying, or otherwise entering the front ranks as notables. Yet the majority did not. There remained a social hierarchy consisting of the Romanized, the partly assimilated, and the unassimilated (here were the many rural Berbers who did not know Latin). Yet in this schema considered among the "assimilated" might be very poor immigrants from other regions of the Empire. These imperial distinctions overlay the preexisting stratification of economic classes, e.g., there continued the practice of slavery, and there remained a coopted remnant of the wealthy Punic aristocracy.

The stepped-up pace and economic demands of a cosmopolitan urban life could impact very negatively on the welfare of the rural poor. Large estates (latifundia) that produced cash crops for export often were managed for absentee owners and used slave labor. These 'agrobusiness' operations occupied lands previously tilled by small local farmers. At another social interface met the fundamental disagreement and social tensions between pastoral nomads, who had their herds to graze, and sedentary farmers. The best lands were usually appropriated for planting, often going to the better-connected socially, politically. These economic and status divisions would become manifest from time to time in various ways, e.g., the collateral revolt in 238, and the radical, quasi-ethnic edge to the Donatist schism.

== Personalities from Roman Tunisia ==
=== The Gordian dynasty ===
In 238 local proprietors rose in revolt, arming their clients and agricultural tenants who entered Thysdrus (modern El Djem) where they killed a rapacious official and his bodyguards. In open revolt, they then proclaimed as co-emperors the aged Governor of the Province of Africa, Gordian I (c. 159–238) and his son, Gordian II (192–238). Gordian I had served at Rome in the Senate and as Consul, and had been the Governor of various provinces. The very unpopular current Emperor Maximinus Thrax (who had succeeded the dynasty of Severus) was campaigning on the middle Danube. In Rome the Senate sided with the insurgents of Thysdrus. When the African revolt collapsed under an assault by local forces still loyal to the emperor, the Senate elected two of their number, Balbinus and Pupienus, as co-emperors. Then Maximus Thrax was killed by his disaffected soldiers. Eventually the grandson of Gordian I, Gordian III (225–244), of the Province of Africa, became the Emperor of the Romans, 238–244. He died on the Persian frontier. His successor was Philip the Arab.

=== Salvius Julianus ===
Julian's life demonstrates the opportunities available to gifted provincials. Also it gives a view of Roman Law, whose workings crafted much of the structure holding together the various nationalities across the Empire. Apparently Julian came from a family of the Latin culture which had gradually become established in Africa Province, although his youth and early career are not recorded.

Senatus Populusque Romanus.

Salvius Julianus (c. 100 – c. 170), Roman jurist, Consul in 148, was a native of Hadrumetum (modern Sousse, Tunisia) on the east coast of Africa province. He was a teacher; one of his students, Africanus, was the last recorded head of the influential Sabinian school of Roman jurists. In Roman public life, Julian eventually came to hold several high positions during a long career. He acquired great contemporary respect as a jurist, and modernly is regarded as one of the best in Roman legal history. "The task of his life consisted, in the first place, in the final consolidation of the edictal law; and, secondly, in the composition of his great Digest in ninety books."

Julian served the Empire at its top echelon, on the Counsilium (imperial council) of three emperors: Hadrian (r. 117–138), Antoninus Pius (r. 138–161), and Marcus Aurelius (r. 161–180). His life spanned a particularly beneficial era of Roman rule, when relative peace and prosperity reigned. Julian had been tribune; he "held all the important senatorial offices from Quaestor to Consul". Later, after his service on the emperor's Counsilium, he left for Germania Inferior to become its Roman governor. He served in the same capacity at Hispania Citerior. At the end of his career, Julian became the Roman governor of his native Africa Province. An inscription found near his native Hadrumetum (modern Sousse, Tunisia) recounts his official life.

The emperor Hadrian appointed Julian, this native of a small city in Africa province, to revise the Praetor's Edict (thereafter called the Edictum perpetuum). This key legal document, then issued annually at Rome by the Praetor urbanus, was at that time a most persuasive legal authority, pervasive in Roman Law. "The Edict, that masterpiece of republican jurisprudence, became stabilized. ... [T]he famous jurist Julian settled the final form of the praetorian and aedilician Edicts."

Later Julian authored his Digesta in 90 books; this work generally followed the sequence of subjects found in the praetorian edict, and presented a "comprehensive collection of responsa on real and hypothetical cases". The purpose of his Digesta was to expound the whole of Roman Law.

In the 6th century, this 2nd-century Digesta of Salvius Julianus was repeatedly excerpted, hundreds of times, by the compilers of the Pandectae, created under the authority of the Byzantine emperor Justinian I (r. 527–265). This Pandect (also known as the Digest, part of the Corpus Juris Civilis) was a compendium of juristic experience and learning. "It has been thought that Justinian's compilers used [Julian's Digesta] as the basis of their scheme: in any case nearly 500 passages are quoted from it." The Pandect, in addition to its official rôle as part of the controlling law of the eastern Roman (Byzantine) Empire, also became a principal source for the medieval study of Roman Law in western Europe.

About Julian's personal life little is known. Apparently he became related in some way (probably through his daughter) to the family of the Roman emperor Didius Julianus, who reigned during the year 193.

Julian died probably in Africa province, as its Roman governor or shortly thereafter. This was during the reign of the philosophical emperor Marcus Aurelius (r. 161–180), who described Julian in a rescript as amicus noster (Latin: "our friend"). "His fame did not lessen as time went on, for later Emperors speak of him in the most laudatory terms. ... Justinian [6th century] speaks of him as the most illustrious of the jurists." "With Iulianus, the Roman jurisprudence reached its apogee."

=== Lucius Apuleius ===
Lucius Apuleius (c. 125 – c. 185), a Berber author of Africa Province, wrote using an innovative Latin style. Although often called Lucius Apuleius, only the name Apuleius is certain. He managed to thrive in several Latin-speaking communities of Carthage: the professional, the literary, and the pagan religious. A self-described full Berber, "half Numidian, half Gaetulian", his origins lay on the upper Bagradas (modern Medjerda) river valley, in Madaura (modern M'Daourouch). In the town lived many retired Roman soldiers, often themselves natives of Africa. His father was a provincial magistrate, of the upper ordo class. When he was still young his father died, leaving a relative fortune to him and his brother.

His studies began at Carthage, and continued during years spent at Athens (philosophy) and at Rome (oratory), where he evidently served as a legal advocate. Comparing learning to fine wine but with an opposite effect, Apuleius wrote, "The more you drink and the stronger the draught, the better it is for the good of your soul." He also traveled to Asia Minor and Egypt. While returning to Carthage he fell seriously ill in Oea (an ancient coastal city near modern Tripoli), where he convalesced at the family home of an old student friend Pontianus. Eventually Apuleius married Prudentilla, the older, wealthy widow of the house, and mother of Pontianus. Evidently the marriage was good; Sidonius Apollinaris called Prudentilla one of those "noble women [who] held the lamp while their husbands read and meditated." Yet debauched and greedy in-laws (this characterization by Apuleius) wantonly claimed he had murdered Pontianus; they did, however, prosecute Apuleius for using nefarius magic to gain his new wife's affections. At the trial in nearby Sabratha the Roman proconsul Claudius Maximus presided. Apuleius, then in his thirties, crafted a trial speech in his own defense, which in written form makes his Apology; apparently he was acquitted. A well-regarded modern critic characterizes his oratory, as it appears in his Apologia:

"We feel throughout the speech a keen pleasure in the display of superior sophistication and culture. We can see how he might well have dazzled the rich citizens of Oea for a while and how he would also soon arouse deep suspicions and hostilities. Particularly one feels that he is of a divided mind about the accusation of wizardry. He deals with the actual charges in tones of amused contempt, yet seems not averse from being considered one of the great magicians of the world."

Apuleius and Prudentilla then moved to Carthage. There he continued his Latin writing, dealing with Greek philosophy, with oratory and rhetoric, and also fiction and poetry. Attracting a significant following, several civic statues were erected in his honor. He showed brilliance speaking in public as a "popular philosopher or 'sophist', characteristic of the second century A.D., which ranked such talkers higher than poets and rewarded them greatly with esteem and cash... ." "He was novelist and 'sophist', lawyer and lecturer, poet and initiate. It is not surprising that he was accused of magic--".

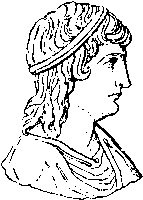
Sketch of Apuleius

His celebrated work of fiction is Metamorphoses, by moderns commonly called The Golden Ass. A well-known work, Apuleius here created an urbane, inventive, vulgar, extravagant, mythic story, a sort of fable of the ancient world. The plot unfolds in Greece where the hero, while experimenting with the ointment of a sorceress, is changed not into an owl (as intended) but into a donkey. Thereafter his ability to speak leaves him, but he remains able to understand the talk of others. In a famous digression (one of many), the celebrated folktale of Cupid and Psyche is artfully told by a crone. Therein Cupid, son of the Roman goddess Venus, falls in love with a beautiful but mortal girl, who because of her loveliness has been jinxed by Cupid's mother; the god Jupiter resolves their dilemma. The hero as donkey listens as the story is told. After such and many adventures, in which he finds comedy, cruelty, onerous work as a beast-of-burden, circus-like exhibition, danger, and a love companion, the hero finally manages to regain his human form—by eating roses. Isis, the Egyptian goddess, in answer to his petitions, directs her priests during a procession to feed the flowers to him. "At once my ugly and beastly form left me. My rugged hair thinned and fell; my huge belly sank in; my hooves separated out into fingers and toes; my hands ceased to be feet... and my tail... simply disappeared." In the last few pages, the hero continues to follow the procession, entering by initiations into the religious service of Isis and Osiris of the Egyptian pantheon.

Metamorphoses is compared by Jack Lindsay to two other ancient works of fiction: Satyricon by Petronius and Daphnis and Chloe by Longus. He also notes that at the end of Metamorphoses "we find the only full testimony of religious experience left by an adherent of ancient paganism... devotees of mystery-cults, of the cults of the savior-gods... ." H. J. Rose comments that "the story is meant to convey a religious lesson: Isis saves [the hero] from the vanities of this world, which make men of no more worth than beasts, to a life of blissful service, here and hereafter." About Apuleius's novel Michael Grant suggests that "the ecstatic belief in mystery religions [here, Isis] marked, in some sense, the transition between state-paganism and Christianity." Yet later he notes that "the Christian Fathers, after long discussion, were disposed to let Apuleius fall from favour."

St. Augustine mentions his fellow African Apuleius in his The City of God. When Apuleius lived was an age, Augustine elsewhere decries, of damnabilis curiositas. In discussing Socrates and Plato on 'the souls of gods, airy spirits, and humans,' Augustine refers to "a Platonist of Madaura", Apuleius, and to his work De Deo Socratis [The God of Socrates]. Augustine, holding the view that the world was under the lordship of the devil, challenged the pagans their reverence for particular gods. Referring to what he found as moral confusion or worse in stories of these gods, and their airy spirits, Augustine suggests a better title for Apuleius' book: "he should have called it De Daemone Socratis, of his devil."

That Apuleius worked magic was widely accepted by many of his contemporaries; he was sometimes compared to Apollonius of Tyana (died c. 97), a magician (whom some pagans later claimed as a miracle-worker, equal to Christ). Apuleius himself was drawn to mystery religions, particularly the cult of Isis. "He held the office of sacerdos prouinciae at Carthage." "In any event Apuleius became for the Christians a most controversial figure."

Apuleius used a Latin style that registered as elocutio novella ("new speech") to his literary contemporaries. This style expressed the everyday language used by the educated, along with naturally embedded archaisms. It worked to transform the more formal, classical grammar once favored since Cicero (106–43 BC). To rhetoricians perhaps it would be asiatic as opposed to attic style. Also new speech pointed toward the future development of modern Romance languages. Some suggest a style source in Africa, "owing its rich colours to the Punic element... his Madauran origins"; yet, while calling Africa informative, Lindsay declares it insufficient:

"[W]e cannot reduce his style as a whole to African influences. His mixture of ornate invention and rhetorical ingenuity with archaic and colloquial forms marks him rather as a man of his epoch, in which the classical heritage is being transformed by a welter of new forces."

Phrases like "oppido formido" [I greatly fear] litter his pages. Apuleius' "prose is a mosaic of internal rhymes and assonances. Alliteration is frequent." One who involutarilly remains alive after a loved one's death is "invita remansit in vita". "This may seem an over-nice analysis of a verbal trick; but Apuleius' creative energy resides precisely in this sort of thing--".

== Christianity, and its schism ==
=== Felicitas and Perpetua ===
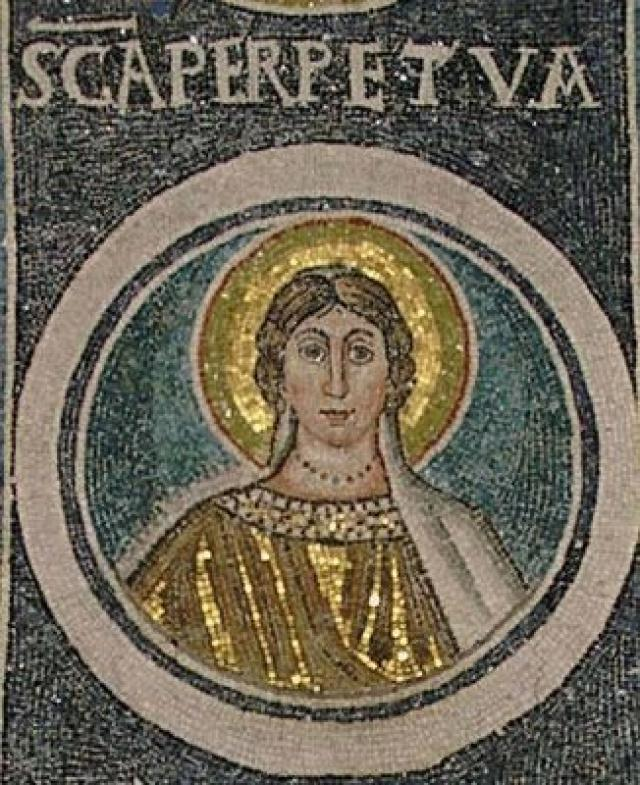
Mosaic of St Perpetua, Croatia

The Roman Imperial cult was based on a general polytheism that, by combining veneration for the paterfamilias and for the ancestor, developed a public celebration of the reigning Emperor as a father and divine leader. From time to time compulsory displays of loyalty or patriotism were required; those refusing the state cult might face a painful death. While polytheists might go along with little conviction, such a cult ran directly contrary to the dedicated Christian life, based on a confessed foundation of a single triune deity.

In the Province of Africa lived two newly baptised Christians, both young women: Felicitas a servant to Perpetua a noble. Felicitas was then pregnant and Perpetua a nursing mother. Together in the arena both were publicly torn apart by wild animals at Carthage in 203 AD. Felicitas and Perpetua became celebrated among Christians as saints. An esteemed writing circulated, containing the reflections and visions of Perpetua (181–203), followed by a narrative of the martyrdom. These manuscript Acts were soon read aloud in Churches throughout the Empire.

=== Tertullian, Cyprian ===
Three significant theologians arose in the Province, all enjoying native African ancestry: Tertullian, Cyprian, Augustine.

Tertullian (160–230) was born, lived, and died at Carthage. An expert in Roman law, a convert to Christianity and then a priest, his Latin books on theology were once widely known. He articulated an early understanding of the Trinity. Tertullian later came to espouse an unforgiving puritanism, after Montanus, and so ended in heresy.

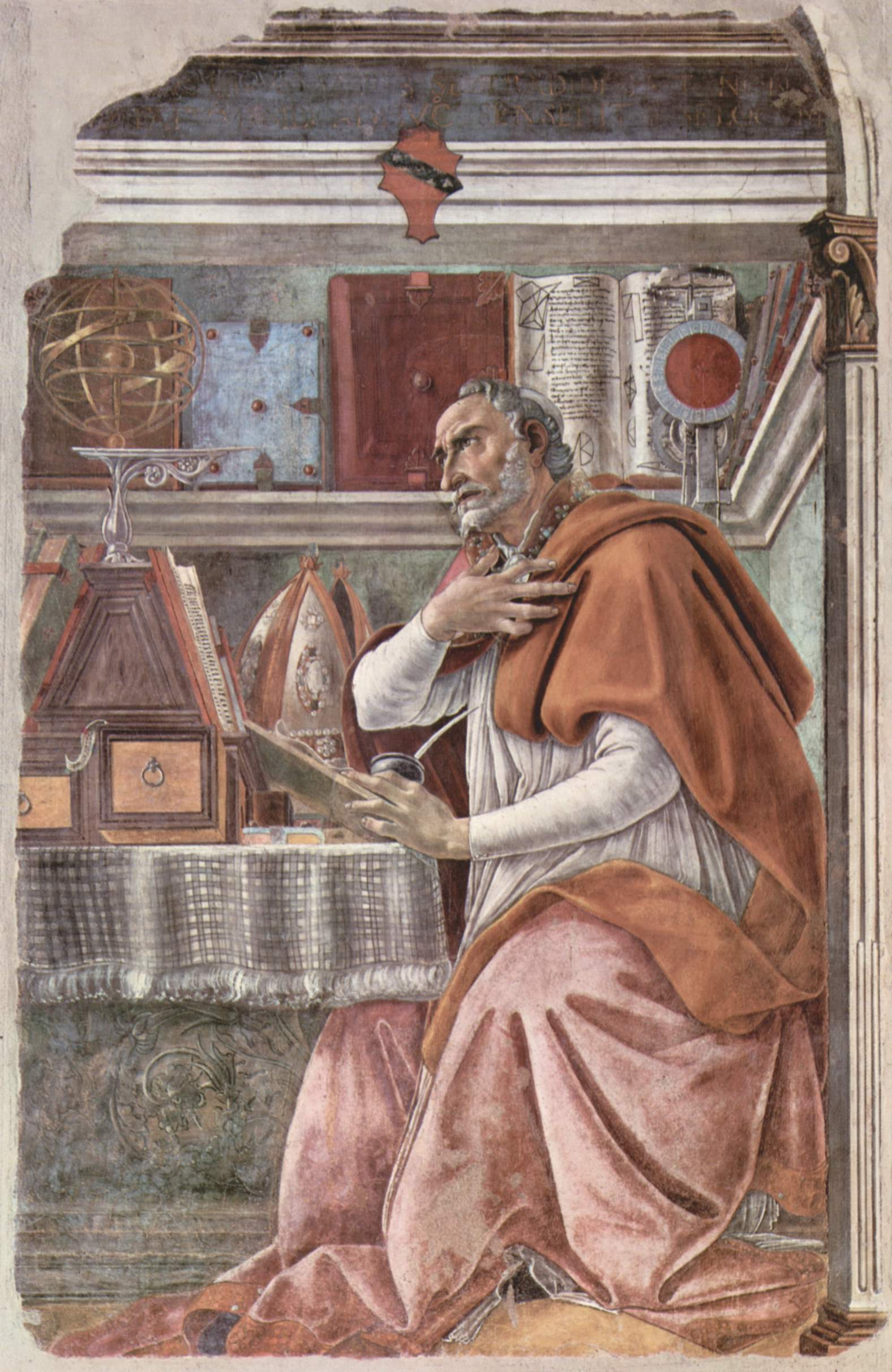
St. Augustine, by Botticelli (1480).

Cyprian (210–258) was Bishop of Carthage, and a martyr. Also a lawyer and a convert, he considered Tertullian his teacher. Many of Cyprian's writings kindly offer moral counsel, and are read today. His book De Unitate Ecclesiae [On Church Unity] (251) also became well known. He accepted the Church's correction of these views (which he then renounced): that a repentant heretic required a new baptism; that a bishop in his diocese was supreme.

=== Augustine of Hippo ===
St. Augustine (354–430), Bishop of Hippo (modern Annaba), was born at Tagaste in Numidia (modern Souk Ahras). His mother St. Monica, a pillar of faith, evidently was of Berber heritage. Augustine himself did not speak a Berber language; his use of Punic is unclear. At Carthage, Augustine received his higher education. Later, while professor of Rhetoric at Milano (then the Roman imperial capital), he pursued his belief in Manichaean teachings. Following his strong conversion to Christianity, and after his mother died at Ostia in Italia, Augustine returned to Africa. Here he served as a priest, and later as bishop of Hippo; as the author of many works, he eventually became a primary influence on subsequent Christian theology.

Well-versed in the pagan philosophy of the Greco-Roman world, Augustine both criticized its perceived shortcomings, and employed it to articulate the message of Christianity. Although open to the study and close reading of his fellow African writer, Apuleius (c. 125–185), a pagan thaumaturge, Augustine strongly criticized his understanding of spiritual phenomena. In a well-known work, The City of God, Augustine embarks on wide-ranging discussions of Christian theology, and also applies his learned views to history. He harshly criticizes the ancient state religion of Rome, yet frankly admires traditional Roman civic virtues; in fact he opines that their persistent practice found favor with God (unknown in name to them), hence the progress of the Roman cause throughout the Mediterranean. Later he traces the history of Israel as guided by God, and searches out the gospels of Christianity.

Augustine remains one of the most prominent and most admired of all Christian theologians. His moral philosophy remains influential, e.g., his contribution to the further evolved doctrine of the Just War, used to test whether or not a military action may be considered moral and ethical. His books, e.g., The City of God, and Confessions, are still widely read and discussed.

=== Donatist schism ===
The Donatist schism was a major disruption to the church. The schism followed a severe Roman persecution of Christians ordered by the Emperor Diocletian (r. 284–305). An earlier persecution had caused divisions over whether or how to accept back into the church contrite Christians who had apostatized under state threats, abuse, or torture. Then in 313 the new Emperor Constantine by the Edict of Milan had granted tolerance to Christianity, himself becoming a Christian. This turnabout led to confusion within the Church; in Northwest Africa this accentuated the divide between wealthy urban members aligned with the Empire, and the local rural poor who were salt-of-the-earth believers (which included as well social and political dissidents). In general, agrarian Christian Berbers tended to be Donatists, although more assimilated urban Berbers probably were Catholic. To this challenge the Church did not respond well. The Donatists became centered in southern Numidia, the Catholics in Carthage.

One issue was whether a priest could perform his spiritual office if not personally worthy of the holy sacraments. The Donatist schismatics set up parallel churches in order to practice a ritual purity as a collective body like ancient Israel, a purity beyond that required by the Catholic Church.

Some Donatists sought to become martyrs by provocative acts. A disorderly, rural extremist group became associated with the Donatists, the circumcellions, who opposed taxes, debt collection, and slavery, and would obstruct normal commerce in order to protect the poor. The Donatist schism also became later linked to two revolts led by the Berber half-brothers, Firmus (372–375), and then Gildo (395–398). As a bishop Augustine came to condemn the Donatists throngs for rioting; at one time there were Imperial persecutions. Church negotiations lasted about a century until finally the Catholics declared Donatism a heresy in 405, though general tolerance persisted until the ban became enforced late in the 6th century.

== Berber revolts ==
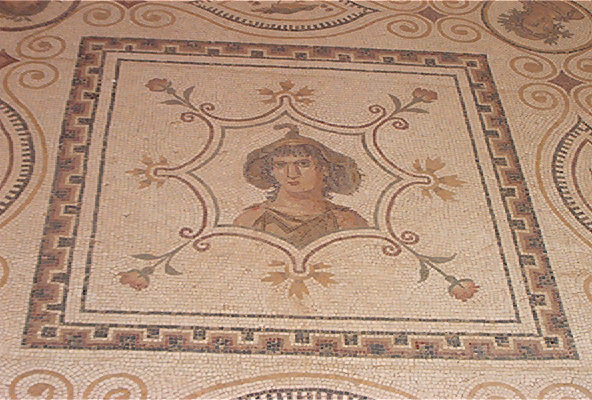
Residential mosaic of Roman-era Tunisia.

The two armed conflicts described below may or may not differ from the revolt of Tacfarinas in 17–24 AD. According to one view, the two conflicts were not class struggles, nor Berber versus Roman insurrections, although containing potential elements of each. More likely the fighting concerned "a dynastic struggle pitching one lot of African nobles, with their tribes, against another." Although enjoying maybe "unquestioningly loyal tribesmen on [their] great estates" the nobles themselves held a divided loyalty stemming from their ambivalent role as mediators between Roman Empire elites and local tribal life, mostly rural. Based on subsistence farming, or herding, such tribes remained remote from the literate cities. To their Berber subjects "the nobles offered protection in exchange for tribute and military service." Protection promised safety against attacks by another tribe, but also against slave raiders from the cities. The nobles themselves required revenue and the ability to marshall "armed might" on the one hand, and on the other "their fluency in Roman cultural forms and their ability to communicate as equals with the rest of the Roman elites." If so equipped the nobles "occupied key positions in Roman provincial administration." Yet an unexpected shift in status among the nobles might on occasion trigger a desperate resort to arms, an intra-noble dynastic struggle.

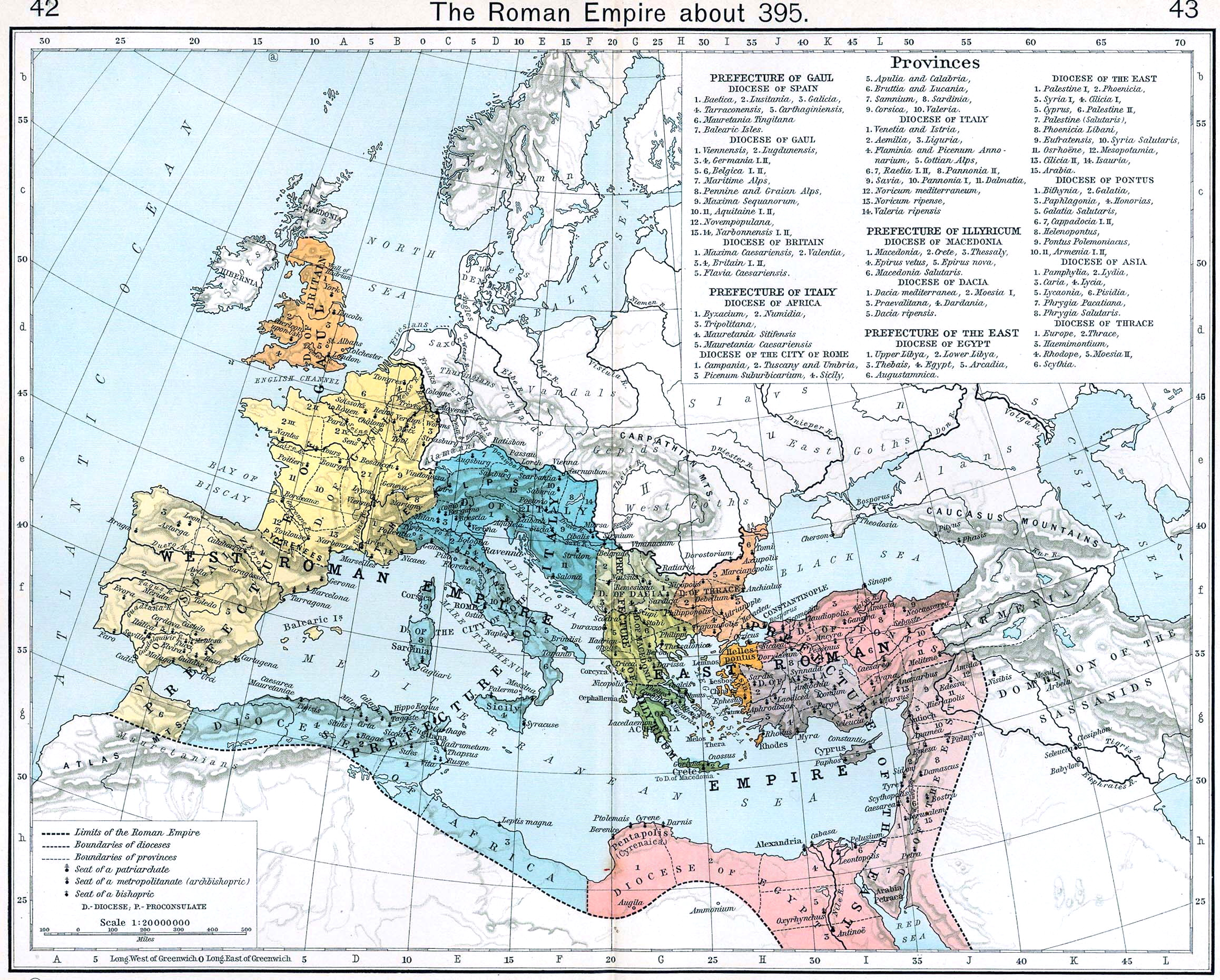
Administrative divisions of the Empire in 395: Diocese of Africa in light blue.

Another view holds that the nobles Firmus and Gildo each continued the struggle of the commoner Tacfarinas, that the fight involved class issues and pitted Berber against Roman. In the intervening 350 years the struggle had gone on—hot or cold, or 'underground'. Both Firmus and Gildo enlisted the dispossessed by aligning with the dissenting Donatist churches and its more radical circumcellion movement. The conflicts were part of the long effort by native agricultural people to reclaim their farming and pasture lands, seized by the Romans as a result of military victories. Professor Laroui differentiates two primary perspectives on North African history of the Roman period, i.e., colonial and liberal. The colonial perspective conforms to the "dynastic struggle view" first suggested above; it adopts the interests of Imperial Rome and its clients. The liberal perspective takes the conquered and colonized view, that of the dispossessed farmers and herders, the expropriated natives—former proprietors of the land. Taking this "liberal" view, Laroui sees the conflict here as centuries old, and as more of an ethnic struggle for fairness and justice.

Firmus (died 375) and Gildo (died 398) were half-brothers, from a family of Berber landowners whose Roman affiliation was recognized by the imperial government at Constantinople. Their father Nubel was known as a regulus ("little king") of a Mauri tribe of Berbers, according to the historian Ammianus Marcellinus. Nubel the father held three positions: influential leader in Berber tribal politics; Roman official with high connections; and, private master of large land holdings. Nubel probably is the same person as Flavius Nubel, the son of a vir perfectissimus and Comes (Roman titles of prestige and authority). Flavius Nubel himself was a commander of Roman cavalry, whose inscription also credits to him the construction of a local Christian church. Six sons of Nubel are listed: Firmus, Sammac, Gildo, Mascezel, Dius, and Mazuc. In addition to his wife Nonnica, the father Nubel had concubines, "a Christianized version of polygamy." The names of Nubel's children probably indicate an ambivalent cultural strategy, half-imperial, half-tribal, half Roman, half Berber. Gildo from the Libyan root GLD signifies a "ruler" (in modern Berber "Aguelid"). Firmus and Dius derive from Latin. Sammac and Mascezel are also Berber. A daughter's name Cyria is Greek.

=== Firmus ===
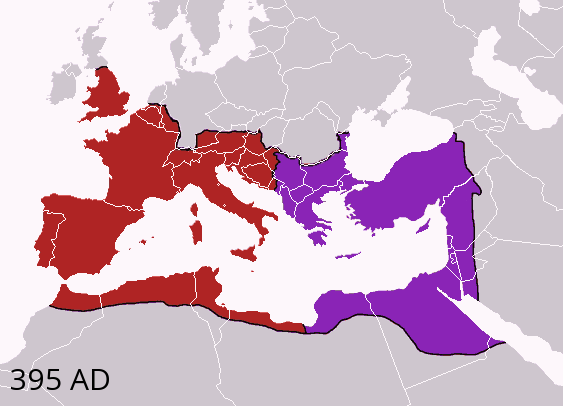
Imperial East-West boundaries at death of Theodosius I (r. 379–395), 'sole' Emperor. Western Roman Empire Eastern Roman (Byzantine) Empire

Sammac became holder of "a fortified estate built up... like a city" whose inhabitants were local Mauri Berbers. An inscription erected by Sammac refers to his endorsement by the tribal Mauris and to his authority conferred by Imperial Rome. Sammac was a close friend of the Comes ("Count") of Africa, Romanus; he also enjoyed substantial family connections. Yet by order of his brother Firmus, Sammac was assassinated for unstated reasons (sibling rivalry is suggested). Firmus sought to justify his actions, but Romanus effectively blocked his efforts, and denounced him to higher Roman officials. Cornered, Firmus took up arms. Hence Ammianus Marcellinus calls Firmus perduellis (national enemy), rebellis (insurgent), and latro (brigand); the nearby bishop Augustine of Hippo calls him rex barbarus (barbarian king). The historian Gibbon, however, blames a corrupt Romanus for the revolt.

Firmus gained support for his revolt (372–375) from three of his brothers and from Mauri tribal allies that he through his family could summons to the struggle. Also attracted were the dissendent Donatist Christian churches, and anti-Roman, anti-taxation sentiment. Evidently Firmus styled himself King of Mauritania. Perhaps he went over to the side of the rural dispossessed and championed their cause. Yet he was opposed by his younger brother Gildo, who remained aligned with Rome. The formidable Comes Theodosius (father of the future Emperor) led a Roman force to Africa against Firmus. The subsequent military campaign, wrote Ammianus, tore at social loyalties, "disrupted the balance of power relationships in the region." In the fighting that led to the defeat of Firmus, Gildo served the Romans under the Comes Theodosius.

=== Gildo ===
Gildo a decade later in 386 became the Comes of Africa, commander of its Roman military forces, the effective leader. Gildo's appointment resulted from his long association with the house of Theodosius, whose son now reigned at Constantinople in the east as the Emperor Theodosius I the Great (r. 379–395). Gildo's daughter Salvina also "had married into the ruling house and into the Constantinopolitan establishment." The Empire, divided into East and West, endured turbulence. Magnus Maximus ruled in the West, having overthrown its Emperor Gratian in 383. Then Maximus moved to claim the purple; for a while in 387 he occupied Africa. Theodosius declared Maximus a "usurper" and after invading Italia in 388 he defeated Maximus in battle. In the meantime in Africa the Comes Gildo had occupied a problematic position during the conflict; his loyalty to Emperor Theodosius was put to the test with questioned but passable results. In 394 at Milan in Italy Stilicho, a half-Vandal Roman general, became regent of the West. With Egypt's grain assigned to the East, Italy's main source was Gildo's Africa. Preferring to deal directly with Theodosius at Constantinople, Gildo suggested the "transfer" of Africa to the East, anathema to Stilicho. Stilicho's protagonist Claudian in his poem De bello Gildonico mocked Gildo's disloyalty.

On the death of Emperor Theodosius I in 395, Gildo "gradually waived his loyalty". His regime drew upon Mauri Berber alliances, and was supportive of Donatist churches (then internally divided, its radicals called circumcelliones). Gildo in 397 declared his loyalty to the new, weak eastern Emperor. "Gildo started his rebellion by withholding the shipment of wheat to Rome." Conflicting evidence may indicate that Gildo "confiscated the imperial lands and distributed them among the circumcelliones and his troops." Ironically, Gildo's defiance was opposed by his own brother Mascezel, who served Stilicho. Conflict between the two brothers had already become bitter, murderous. Driven from the field by Stilicho, Gildo failed to escape east by ship and died captive in 398. Mascezel died soon after. Gildo's daughter Salvina raised her children in Constantinople at the imperial court, in its Christian community. The Vandals led by Gaiseric crossed over to Africa in 429.

These events show a once powerful, 4th-century, Berbero-Roman family in the context of the Mediterranean-wide Empire. "As Roman aristocrats, Nubel's family was not unique in exploiting a local power base in order to play a role at the centre." They also demonstrate the complexities of the loyalties tugging on the Africans of that time and place. Or, on the other hand, beneath all the political complexity may exist a simpler story of the dispossessed seeking capable leaders to further their struggle for the land.

== Late Antiquity ==
=== Berber states ===
The Decline of the Roman Empire in the West was a gradual process punctuated by unheard of events. After eight centuries secure from foreign attack, Rome fell to the Visigoths in 410. By 439 Carthage had been captured by Vandals under Gaiseric (see below). These changes were traumatic to Roman citizens in Africa Province including, of course, those acculturated Berbers who once enjoyed the prospects for livelihood provided by the long fading, now badly broken Imperial economy.

Yet also other Berbers might see a chance for betterment if not liberation in the wake of Rome's slide toward disorder. Living within the empire in urban poverty or as rural laborers, or living beyond its frontiers as independent pastoralists primarily but also as tillers of the soil, were Berbers who might find new political-economic opportunities in Rome's decline, e.g., access to better land and trading terms. The consequent absence of Imperial authority at the periphery soon led to the emergence of new Berber polities. These arose not along the sea coast in the old Imperial cities, but centered inland at the borderland (the limes) of empire, between the steppe and the sown. This "pre-Sahara" geographic and cultural zone ran along the mountainous frontier, the Tell, hill country and upland plains, which separated the "well-watered, Mediterranean districts of the Maghreb to the north, from the Sahara desert to the south." Here Berber tribal chiefs acted through force and negotiation to establish a new source of governing authority.

From west to east across Northwest Africa, eight of these new Berbers states have been identified, being the kingdoms of: Altava (near present-day Tlemcen); the Ouarsenis (by Tiaret); Hodna; the Aures (southern Numidia); the Nemencha; the Dorsale (at Thala, south of El Kef); Capsus (at Capsa); and, Cabaon (in Tripolitania, at Oea). The easternmost five of these Berber kingdoms were located within the old Africa Proconsularis, and all eight were within the now defunct Diocese of Africa (314–432), Carthage its capital. Alike in situation to the newly formed Germanic kingdoms within the fallen Empire in Europe to the north, these Berber kingdoms served two disparate populations: the Romani who were "the settled communities of provincial citizens" and the "barbarians", here the Mauri, "Berber tribes along and beyond the frontier". The Romani contributed the urban resources and fiscal structure for which a civil administration was required, while the Mauri provided fruits of the countryside and satisfied essential military and security requirements. This functional and ethnic duality at the core of the Berber successor states is reflected in the title of the political leader at Altava, one Masuna, found on an inscription: rex gent(ium) Maur(orum) et Romanor(um).

In the Kingdom of Ouarsenis (by Tiaret) were built thirteen large funerary monuments known as Djedars, dating to the 5th and 6th centuries, many being square measuring 50 meters on a side and rising 20 meters high. "While their architectural form echoes a long tradition of massive Northwest African royal mausolea, stretching back to Numidian and Mauretanian kingdoms of the 3rd–1st centuries BC, the closest parallels are with the tumuli or bazinas, with flanking 'chapels', which are distributed in an arc through the pre-Saharan zone and beyond" perhaps several thousand kilometers to the southwest (to modern Mauritania). Some display "decorative carvings and Christian motifs" although the bilingual dedicatory inscriptions are virtually illegible. "The Djedars could thus be considered the ultimate development of an indigenous, pre-Saharan funerary architectural tradition, adapted to fit a Christian, Romanized environment."

Yet an unresolved issue concerns the Christianity of independent Berbers after Roman rule, both Catholic and Donatist, i.e., Berber Christianity under the Vandals, Byzantines, and Arabs. Christianity never completely supplanted the ancient pagan beliefs of Berbers, mixed and augmented by Punic practices and later Greco-Roman. Nor did Christianity among the Berbers attain an enduring unity among its diverse and conflicting believers.

Under the Byzantines, several Berber political entities proximous to Imperial power became nominal vassal-states pledging loyalty to the Empire, who invested their leaders. A major Imperial concern was, by negotiation and trade, or by show or demonstration of might, to harness the anarchic tendencies of these more rural regimes; otherwise, to withstand any challenge. Roman urban centers, however, survived into the 7th century at Tiaret, Altaya, Tlemcen, and Volubilis, where practicing Christians wrote in Latin. Other Berber polities at the periphery of the settled regions retained their total independence.

=== Vandal Kingdom ===
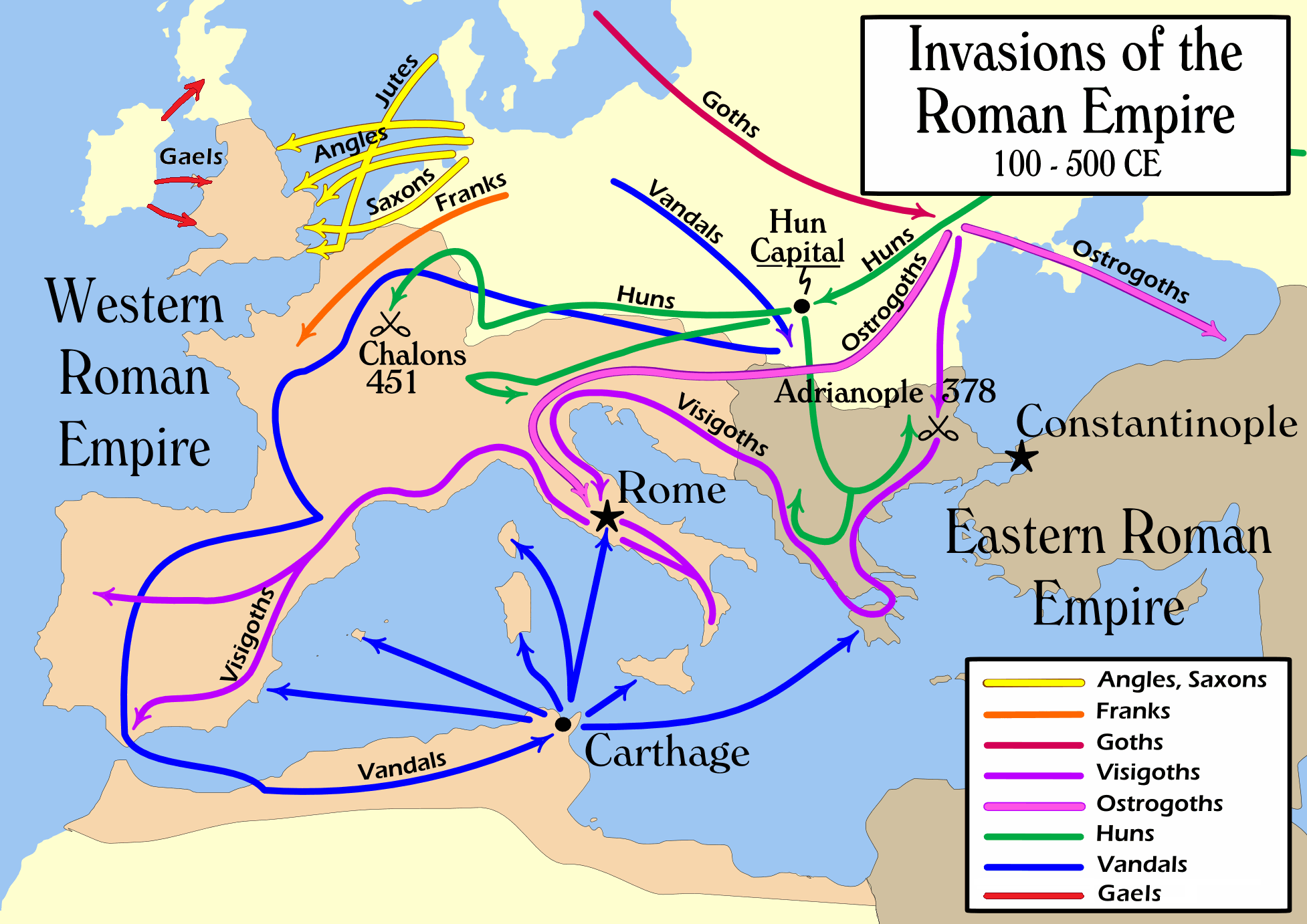
Migrations of the Vandals in blue (c. 270 to 530) from the Vistula river, southeast into Pannonia, westward to Gaul, south into Hispania, across to Africa and Carthage; raids by sea.

In the 5th century, the western Roman Empire was in a steep decline. A Germanic tribal nation the Vandals had already trekked across the Empire to Hispania. In 429 under their king Gaiseric (r. 428–477) the Vandals and the Alans (their Iranian allies), about 80,000 people, traveled the 2,000 kilometres (1,200 mi) from Iulia Traducta in Andalusia across the straits and east along the coast to Numidia, west of Carthage. The next year the Vandals besieged the city of Hippo Regius (on the coast of Numidia) while St. Augustine within awaited his natural death. Eventually in 439 the Vandals captured Carthage, which became the center of their Germanic kingdom.

The western Imperial capital at Ravenna recognized his rule in 442. Yet from Constantinople the eastern Empire attempted reconquest several times. At last in 468 a large Byzantine fleet approached Cape Bon by Carthage, and Gaiseric asked for time to consider submission to Imperial demands. When the wind changed Vandal fire ships were scudded into the fleet causing its ruin. After guaranteeing Catholic freedom of worship, Gaiseric entered a peace treaty with the Byzantines in 474, which lasted about sixty years.

"Nothing could have been more unexpected in North Africa than these conquerors of Germanic origin." Initially many Berbers fought the Vandals as they arrived; after the Vandals' conquest, Berber forces remained the only military threat against them. Yet in governing their kingdom the Vandals did not maintain in full their martial posture against the Berbers, but made alliances with them in order to secure their occupation of the land. In 455 the Gaiseric sailed with an army to the city of Rome.

In religious policy, the Vandals tried to convert the urban Catholic Christians of Africa to their Arian heresy (named after the Egyptian Christian priest Arius, who taught that the Father is greater than the Son and the Spirit). The Vandal regime sent the Catholic clergy into exile and expropriated Catholic churches; in the 520s their efforts turned to persecution, including martyrdom of resisters, yet without success. The Berbers remained aloof. In all Vandal rule would last 94 years (439–533).

The Vandals did provide functional security and governed with a light hand, so that the former Roman province prospered at first. Large estates were confiscated, but with former owners as managers. Roman officials administered public affairs and Roman law courts continued, Latin being used for government business. Yet Romans would wear Vandal dress at the royal court in Carthage. Agriculture provided more than enough to feed the region and trade flourished in the towns. Yet because of their desire to maintain a superiority in status, the Vandals refused to intermarry or agreeably assimilate to the advanced culture of the Romans. Consequently, finer points were overlooked; the Vandals failed to sustain in its entirety the workable civil society situated subtly, uniquely. Berbers confederacies beyond the frontier grew increasingly powerful, dangerous to the prevailing regime.

=== Byzantine Empire ===
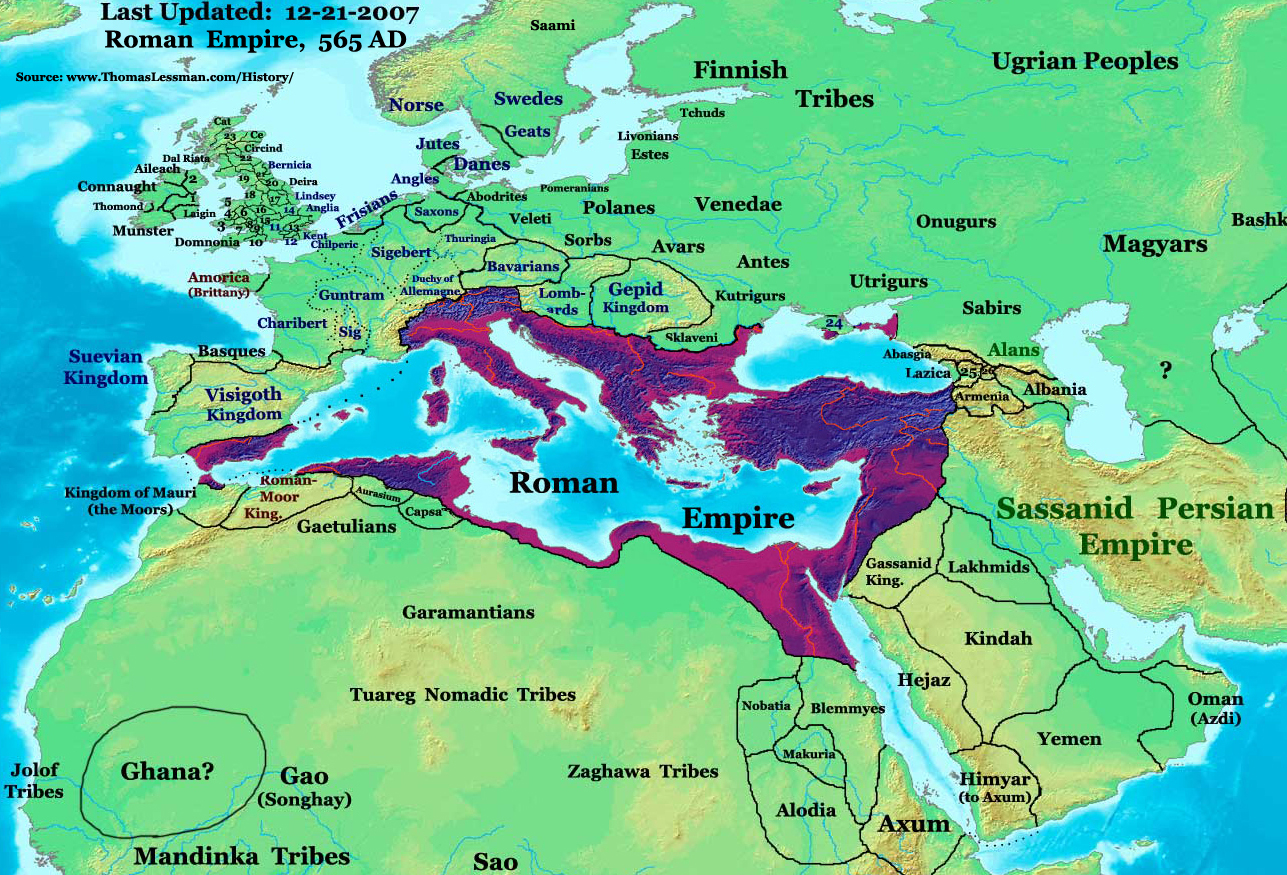
Byzantine Empire in 565, at its height.

The Eastern Romans, known also as the Byzantine Empire, eventually recaptured Rome's Africa province during the Vandalic War in 534, when led by their celebrated general Belisarius. The Byzantines rebuilt fortifications and border defenses (the limes), and entered into treaties with the Berbers. Nevertheless, for many decades security and prosperity were precarious and were never fully restored. Direct Byzantine rule didn't extend far beyond the coastal cities. The African interior remained under the control of various Berber tribal confederacies, e.g., the Byzantines contested against the Berber Kingdom of Garmules.

Early in the 7th century, several new Berber groups (the Jarid and Zanata of the Auruba) converted to Catholicism, joining Berbers already Christian, although other Berbers remained attached to their gods. In the 540s the restored Catholic Church in Africa was disrupted by the Emperor Justinian's position in favor of the Monophysite doctrine.

In the early 7th century, the Byzantine Empire entered a period of serious crises that would alter the future of Tunisia. For centuries Byzantium's greatest enemy had been the Sassanid Persians, and the two powers were chronically at war with each other (the Roman-Persian Wars). The warfare was often intense but usually resulted in small border changes. In the 7th century however, the situation changed dramatically. Persistent religious discord within the Empire, followed by the overthrow of Emperor Maurice by the tyrant Phocas, severely weakened the Byzantines. The Persians under Chosroes II invaded the Byzantine Empire, along with allies from the north: the Eurasian Avars and Slav confederacies. Much of the Empire was overrun and its end seemed near.

It was the son of the Exarch of Carthage, Heraclius (575–641), who would restore the empire's fortunes. Heraclius sailed east across the Mediterranean with an African fleet to the Byzantine capital city of Constantinople and overthrew the usurper Phocas. Heraclius then became Roman Emperor in 610. He began reorganizing the government and erecting defenses to counter threats to the capital. Notwithstanding, the Persians continued their invasion, meeting little resistance, taking Antioch in 611, Jerusalem in 614, and Alexandria in 619, in an astonishing series of victories. The hostile forces of Chosroes II soon stood before Constantinople. In response, Heraclius at great risk moved quickly a Roman army by ship east over the Black Sea, landing near his Khazar allies. In subsequent fighting the Byzantines managed to out-flank the Persians. By 627 Heraclius was marching on their capital Ctesiphon in a complete reversal of fortune. Then in 628 the Persian Shah, Chosroes II, was killed in a revolt by his generals.

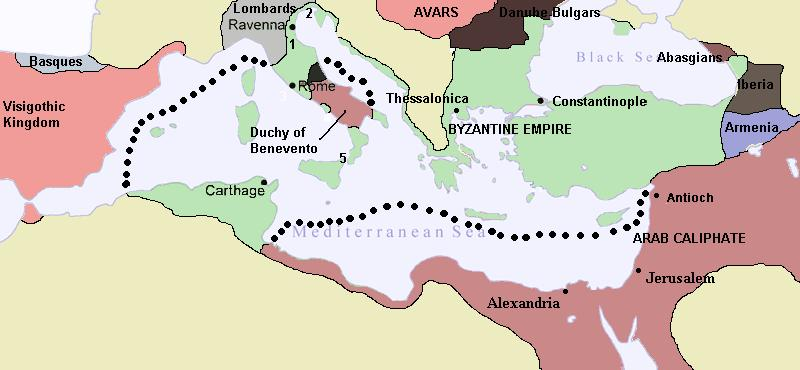
Byzantine Empire, 650, still with its Exarchate of Carthage, yet after its recent loss of Syria (634–636) and of Egypt (639–641) to the Arabs of Islam.

As a result of these dramatic and tumultuous events, Sassanid Persia was in disarray and confusion. Consequently, the Byzantines were able to retake their provinces of Egypt and Syria. Yet with the return of the Romans, the pre-existing religious discord between the local Monophysite Christians of Egypt and the official imperial Chalcedonian Church also returned. In order to mediate this Christological conflict, Emperor Heraclius attempted to work out a theological compromise. The result was Monothelitism, whose compromise doctrine satisfied neither Monophysite nor Chalcedonian; the religious discord among Christians continued to conflict the Empire.

Yet events along the imperial frontier did not rest. To the south, the Arab peoples of the desert began to stir under the influence of a new Islam. In 636 at the Battle of Yarmuk to the east of the Sea of Galilee the Arab Islamic armies decisively defeated the Byzantine forces. Soon the recently lost and regained Roman provinces of Syria and Egypt would be lost again by the Byzantines—with finality—to emerging Islam.

Following the Arab invasion and occupation of Egypt in 640, there were Christian refugees who fled west, until arriving in the Exarchate of Africa (Carthage), which remained under Byzantine rule. Here serious disputes arose within the Catholic churches at Carthage over Monophysite doctrines and Monothelitism, with St. Maximus the Confessor leading the orthodox Catholics.

== See also ==
- Berber people
- Berber languages
- Utica
- Carthage
- Salvius Julianus
- Septimius Severus
- Apuleius
- Felicitas and Perpetua
- Tertullian
- Cyprian
- Augustine
- Firmus
- Gildo
- Africa Province
- Diocese of Africa
- Exarchate of Africa
- Praetorian prefecture of Africa
- North Africa during the Classical Period
- History of Tunisia
