= Zammac =

- Agellid
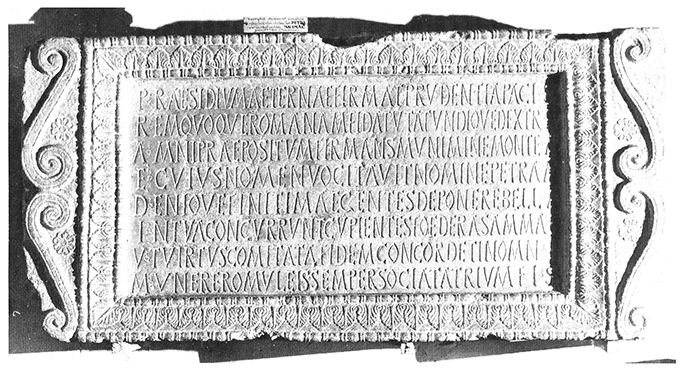
- The dedication of the Fundus Petrensis, the praedium/praesidium of Zammac, Algiers

King of the Quinquegentiani
- Reign: ?–370
- Predecessor: Nuvel
- Successor: Firmus
- Born: 4th century Mauretania Caesariensis
- Died: 370; Mauretania Caesariensis
- Father: Nuvel
- Mother: Nunika
- Religion: Donatism

Zammac also known as Sammac (Samaco) or Salmaces was a 4th-century Romanized Berber prince from Mauretania Caesariensis who was assassinated around 370 by his half-brother Firmus following a succession dispute. He was the son of Nubel.

== Biography ==
According to Jean-Pierre Laporte's analyses, he was the legitimate successor to King Nubel:

« Sammac was directly linked to the Count of Africa, Romanus, and was likely his client. It was through him specifically in the dedication of his praedium or praesidium that the influence and power inherited from his father were manifested. Consequently, he was undoubtedly the legitimate heir, at least from our perspective. This context makes it easier to understand why his ambitious half-brother Firmus assassinated him to seize power. It also clarifies the sharp reaction of Count Romanus to the murder of one of his key allies figure essential to controlling Mauretania Caesariensis. This was no mere succession dispute within a Moorish tribe; it was a conflict that directly affected the Roman administration of the province in a particularly sensitive area: the management and control of the tribes.»

Like his father before him, Sammac was expected to maintain peace through treaties concluded with the Moorish tribes of his region. This role is notably attested to by a passage in the dedication of the praedium/praesidium of M'lakou. Here is the translation of the dedication in question:

« The foresight of an everlasting peace fortifies this stronghold. It also shields the Roman state on all sides through loyal support. Guarding the river, the fortress reinforces the hill with a rampart, and takes the name Petra from it. Consequently, neighboring peoples eager to end the war hasten to seek peace through your treaties, Sammac, so that valor, the companion of fidelity may be united in heart and forever allied with the triumphs of the Romuleans (descendants of Romulus).»

The stronghold in question here is a fortified site known as Petra (near the modern town of Ighzer Amokrane, in Kabylia), built by Sammac.It was both an agricultural and a military estate—a dual nature well captured by the terms praesidium and praedium. Its foundation was strategic in purpose, as it commanded the passage between Saldae, Tubusuptu, and Auzia. Estate which was later destroyed during the revolt of Firmus.

== Bibliography ==
- Edward Gibbon (1819). History of the Decline and Fall of the Roman Empire.
