= Nuvel =

- Agellid
- Ruins of Nuvel's castle, the Petra Mlakou

King of the Quinquegentiani
- Reign: 4th century
- Predecessor: Unknown
- Successor: Zammac
- Born: Mauretania Caesariensis
- Died: Mauretania Caesariensis
- Issue: Zammac; Firmus; Gildo; Mazuca; Mascezel; Dius; Cyria
Regnal name
- Flavio Nuvel
- House: Quinquegentiani
- Religion: Donatism

Nubel or Nuvel was a Quinquegentian king from the Jubalenis tribe (a tribe established near the region of the ancient city of Auzia), having lived in the middle of the fourth century in Petra Mlakou Castle.

He is considered by Ammianus Marcellinus to be one of the most powerful Numidian kings of his time.

== Biography ==
=== Etymology ===
The name has been theorized to come from old lybian as the root of the name, NBL is phonologically entirely plausible in Berber, though studies of the name have not concluded in finding a meaning.

=== Reign ===
Nubel is generally identified by many modern scholars as the same person as Flavio Nuvel a romanized and christianized berber, who, according to an inscription found at Rusguniae (present-day Tamentfoust, Algeria), in Caesarean Mauretania, would have served as commander of a cavalry unit (Latin: praepositus equitum armigerorum iuniorum). This identification was questioned in the 1970s by the authors of the Prosopography of the Late Roman Empire. In particular, he played an important role in the Roman provincial administration, for which he was responsible for supervising the local tribes, his indigenous origin contributing and guaranteeing in a certain way a firmer control of the region.

Nubel, died at an unknown date, certainly before Firmus' war began, which was primarily triggered by complications surrounding his succession.

Far more than a "typical" local lord, Nubel was a member of the high Roman provincial administration and given his indigenous origins was tasked by and on behalf ofthe Roman authorities with overseeing the tribes. His legitimate son, Sammac, inherited his role and status. His illegitimate son, Firmus, killed his half-brother to seize this power, thereby triggering the revolt that would come to bear his name. Another of his sons, Gildo, went on to have a brilliant career in Rome, becoming Count of Africa and entering the emperor’s inner circle, a connection cemented when he married his daughter, Salvina, to one of the emperor’s nephews. This serves as a striking example of the rise of high-ranking officials of "barbarian" origin within the Empire during the late 4th century.

=== True Cross ===
According to a hypothesis by S. Gsell that was subsequently taken up and developed by G. Camps, Nubel if identified with Flavius Nuvel, the officer in the Roman army and commander of a cavalry unit built around the middle of the 4th century, with his wife, Nonnica, a basilica at Rusguniae that housed a relic of the True Cross.

=== Political significance ===
Ammianus highlights his political significance (XXIX, V, 2), describing him as "Nubel, velut regulus per nationes Mauricas potentissimus" translated as "a very powerful petty king among the Moorish nations." This somewhat enigmatic description, which is often underestimated, is, according to Jean-Pierre Laporte, fully explained by the dedication found at the praedium/praesidium belonging to his son, Zammac, at M’lakou. The latter had constructed it in the manner of a city: "fundus Petrensis, in modum urbis" (Ammianus Marcellinus, XXIX, V, 13). The identification is certain; three distinct pieces of evidence align: the name of the "fundus", the name of its owner, and its proximity to Tubusuctu. In the dedication, the structure is referred to by both the term "praesidium" which carries a military connotation and "praedium", denoting an agricultural estate, thereby reflecting its dual nature. The first and last letters of the eight lines are set apart from the rest of the text by an hedera, which clearly reveals a double acrostic: "Praedium Sammacis".

== Issue ==
Nubel had 7 known descendants:

- Zammac/Sammac
- Firmus (who killed Zammac and rebelled against Valentinian I)
- Gildo (who rebelled against Emperor Honorius)
- Mazuca
- Mascezel
- Dius
- His daughter Cyria.

Although according to Ammianus Marcellinus, he also had illegitimate children from relations with his concubines. According to Jean-Pierre Laporte:

"Although probably a Christian, judging by the religion of his children, Nubel was polygamous, an old Libyan tradition that the Christianization of the family had not been able to eliminate. His children, born of a legitimate wife and concubines, were therefore of different status. If Ammianus mentions this detail in the first sentence of his account, it is because it was important for the rest of his presentation: the different fate reserved for his children in Nubel's succession "provoked discord and wars" (Ammianus, ibidem).

== Culture ==
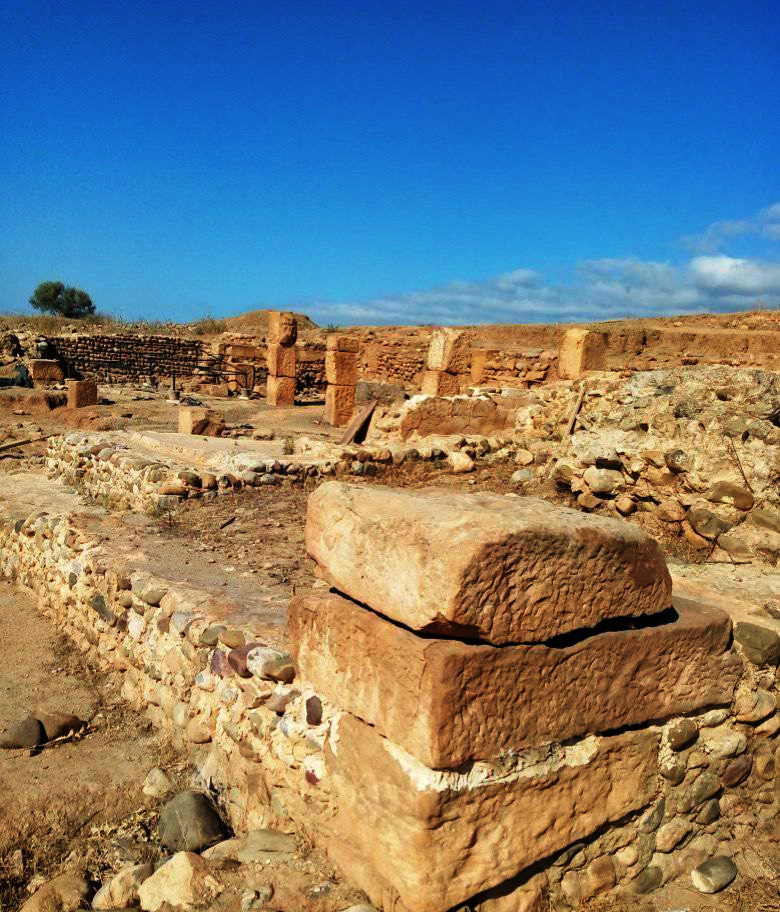
Castle of Petra Mlakou

The residence of Nubel is Petra Mlakou Castle, also known as Mlakou, is a historical site former castle of the Berber King Nubel located near Béjaïa in Algeria. Destroyed in the 4th century by Theodosius during the war against Firmus, son of Nubel who will wage a war of succession against his brother Zammac. Petra Mlakou was the residence of Nubel, a Berber king, and his son Zammac. According to the Roman historian Ammianus Marcellinus, Petra was "the size of a city".

Presented by archaeologists as "the seat of residence and governance of the region", Petra was razed to the ground by Theodosius after Firmus revolted against the authority of Emperor Valentinian II. Description by Stéphane Gsell in his "Note on an inscription by Ighzer Amokrane", Stéphane Gsell describes Petra Mlakou Castle as a "spur that commands the confluence of the Oued-Seddouk with the Oued-Sahel (Soummam) to the north". He also mentions the presence of "traces of walls, capitals, well-preserved columns" and "stones bearing characters and designs used for neighbouring constructions".

== Notes et references ==
=== Bibliography ===
- J. R., Martindale (1971). The prosopography of the later Roman Empire. Cambridge e Nova Iorque: Cambridge University Press.
- Brent D., Shaw (2011). Sacred violence. Cambridge: Cambridge University Press. p. 910. ISBN 978-0-521-19605-5.
