= Mascezel =

- Agellid

King of the Quinquegentiani
- Reign: 398
- Predecessor: Gildo
- Successor: title abolished (?)
- Born: 4th century Mauretania Caesariensis
- Died: 398; Rome; Western Roman Empire
- Spouse: Unnamed wife
- Issue: Two sons
- Father: Nuvel
- Mother: Nonica (?)
- Religion: Donatism

Mascezel (Latin: Masceldelus or Mascezel; died c. 398) was briefly ruler of Roman North Africa after the defeat of his brother Gildo during the Gildonic war in 398 AD.

== Origin, revolts of Firmus, Gildo ==
Mascezel was the son of Nubel, a Mauretanian warlord in the service of Rome. After the death of Nubel (about 370 AD.) a quarrel broke out between his eldest sons, Zamma and Firmus, over their father's vast inheritance. Firmus killed Zamma, but was attacked by Romanus, the Roman count of Africa, who favored his brother. In consequence Firmus broke into revolt, and the long oppression to which Romanus had subjected the province during his unpopular rule gained the rebel many an adherent even among the Roman citizens of Africa, which Firmus soon established as an independent kingdom, while Romanus fled. Valentinian I, who was emperor at the time, sent his veteran general Theodosius (father of Theodosius I) to put down the rebellion. In the meantime Firmus' cruelty and depravity in his rule had lost him the people's sympathies, and Theodosius had no trouble driving him from the province; Firmus fled into the Libyan desert, and committed suicide after the Berber monarch, in whose court he found shelter, agreed to hand him over to Rome.

During the war, two of Firmus' younger brothers, Gildo and Mascezel, had supported the Romans against him. Some years later Theodosius I, then emperor, appointed Gildo governor of the province, hoping that this powerful and apparently loyal provincial would succeed in firmly attaching his subjects to the authority of Rome, by the influence of his wealthy clan. Instead, however, Gildo proved as execrable a tyrant as his brother, and ruled the province with the iron hand of a despot during twelve long years, in which the Roman government could not muster the will or moral courage to bring him to account. When Theodosius died in 395 and the empire was divided between his sons into East and west, Africa became a part of the western Empire, nominally ruled by Honorius, but really by his energetic and conscientious Vandal minister, Stilicho. Since the latter was not likely to continue tolerating Gildo's abuse, the latter decided to deliver his allegiance to the eastern empire of Arcadius, who, under the influence of his favorite Eutropius, was hostile to Stilicho, and eager to detract from his possessions.

== African command ==
Meanwhile, Gildo had fallen out with his younger brother Mascezel, who was forced to flee to Italy for protection, while Gildo ordered the execution of his wife and children at home. Stilicho, who was in search of an able subordinate to lead the expedition to recover Africa from the treacherous Gildo, immediately enrolled Mascezel into his service, entrusting him with the command of the 5,000 Roman legionnaires allocated to put down the revolt. His superior capability, according to a contemporary panegyrist (Claudian), combined with the discipline of the Roman soldiery, secured Mascezel a prompt and easy victory. According to Paulinus of Milan, Ambrose of Milan appeared to Mascazel in a dream and assured him of his success against his brother. Gildo was defeated in an almost bloodless engagement shortly after Mascezel's landing, and committed suicide in prison after being captured in his flight from the field of battle.

== Death ==
After the initial applause which greeted his victory, Mascezel quickly fell out of favor in the court of Honorius. Zosimus described his death as follows:

By means of this victory, the brother of Gildo restored Africa to Honorius, and returned to Italy. Though Stilico was envious of him for his great achievement, yet he pretended an attachment to him, and gave him favourable expectations. But subsequently, as he was going to some place in the suburbs [of Rome], and was pacing over the bridge, Masceldelus among others attending on him, the guards, in obedience to a signal which Stilico gave them, thrust Masceldelus into the river, where he perished through the violence of the stream.

== Sources ==
- Claudian, The War against Gildo
- Paulinus of Milan, The Life of St. Ambrose of Milan
- Orosius, History against the Pagans
- Zosimus, New History
