= Mauri =

Latin designation for the Berber population of Mauretania

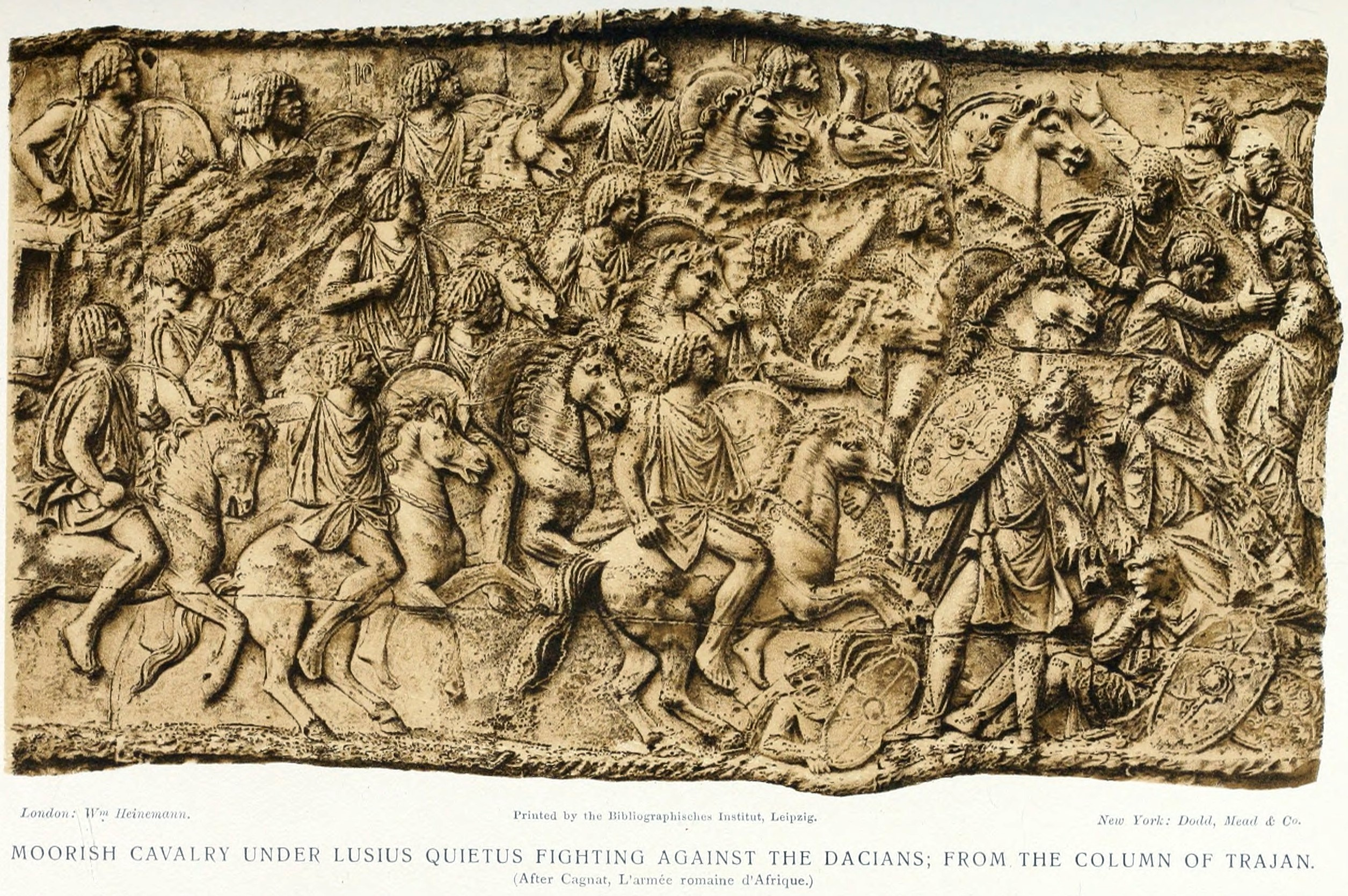
Mauretanian cavalry under Lusius Quietus fighting in the Dacian Wars, from the Column of Trajan

Mauri (from which derives the English term "Moors") was the Latin designation for the Berber population of the Kingdom of Mauretania, located in the western Maghreb on the shores of the Mediterranean Sea, which was later divided into Mauretania Tingitana and Mauretania Caesariensis by the Roman Empire.

== Name ==
Mauri (Μαῦροι) by Strabo, who wrote in the early 1st century, as the native name, which was also adopted into Latin, while he cites the Greek name for the same people as Maurusii (Μαυρούσιοι). The word is the plural form of the Greek word Μαῦρος, meaning black. The name Mauri, understood as a tribal confederation or generic ethnic designator, was initially used to indicate the Berber population of present-day Morocco, but with the territorial expansion of the kingdom of Mauretania, the term Mauri also began to be used to indicate the Berber population of Algeria, (although the latter belonged to the Numidian tribal groups). Both terms presumably group together the first Berber-speaking populations (the oldest Libyco-Berber epigraphy dates to around the 3rd century BC).

== Roman period ==
The Roman Empire under Hadrian (ruled 117–138), showing the location of the Mauri

In 44 CE, the Roman Empire incorporated the region as the province of Mauretania, later divided into Mauretania Caesariensis and Mauretania Tingitana. The area around Carthage was already part of Africa Proconsularis. Roman rule was effective and the provinces became integrated into the empire.

Mauri raids into the southern Iberian Peninsula are mentioned as early as the reign of Nero in the Eclogues of Calpurnius Siculus: "Geryon's meads, a wealthy prize to tempt the fierce Moor's avarice, where Baetis huge, so legends say, rolls downward on his western way to find the shore." The Baetis is the modern Guadalquivir, so this poem implies Mauri raiding into Baetica in the first century CE. Mauri from the mountains beyond the border of the Roman Empire crossed the straits of Gibraltar to raid into the Roman province of Baetica, in what is today southern Spain, in the early 170s. Mauri raided Baetica again in the late 170s or 180s in the reign of Commodus. At that time they besieged the town of Singilia Barba, which was freed from the siege by the arrival of Roman troops from the province of Mauretania Tingitana, led by C. Vallius Maximianus.

By the early Christian era, the byname Mauritius identified anyone originating in the Maghreb. Two prominent "Mauritian" churchmen were Tertullian and St. Augustine. The 3rd-century Christian Saint Mauritius, in whose honour the given name Maurice originated, was from Egypt.

When Aurelian marched against Zenobia in 272, his army included Moorish cavalry. The Notitia Dignitatum mentions Roman cavalry units called Equites Mauri, or Moorish cavalry. Many Mauri were enlisted in the Roman army and were well known as members of the comitatus, the emperor's mobile army, prior to the reign of Diocletian. Jones cites the record of a consular interrogation from Numidia in 320, in which a Latin grammarian named Victor stated that his father was a decurion in Cirta (modern Constantine), and his grandfather served in the comitatus, 'for our family is of Moorish origin'.

By the time of Diocletian, Mauri cavalry were no longer part of the mobile field army, but rather were stationed along the Persian and Danube borders. There was one regiment of Equites Mauri in "each of the six provinces from Mesopotamia to Arabia". The Mauri were part of a larger group called Equites Illyricani, indicating previous service in Illyricum.

While many Mauri were part of the Roman empire, others resisted Roman rule. As Gibbon related for the years 296–297, "From the Nile to Mount Atlas, [North] Africa was in arms." Diocletian's co-emperor Maximian campaigned against the Mauri for two years, entering into their mountain fastness to terrify them of Rome's power. This may be the reason for which the border legions of the Maghreb were reinforced in Diocletian's time with seven new legions spread through Tingitania, Tripolitania, Africa, Numidia, and the Mauritanias.

In the 370s, Mauri raided the Roman towns of the coastal Maghreb. Theodosius the Elder campaigned against them in 372. A Mauri tribe called the Austoriani are specified as participating in these raids. According to Jones, who follows Ammianus Marcellinus, the raids into Tripolitania were caused by the "negligence and corruption of Romanus, the comes Africae ... in 372 Firmus, a [Mauri] chieftain with whom Romanus had quarreled, raised a revolt, winning several Roman regiments to his side". Theodosius defeated the rebellion; however, he was executed shortly thereafter in Carthage.

Firmus’s brother Gildo (also a Mauri chieftain) joined the Romans and helped defeat Firmus' revolt. As a reward, he was given the post of magister utriusque militiae per Africam, or master of foot soldiers and cavalry for Africa. In 397, he broke his allegiance to the Western Empire, then under the control of the child emperor Honorius and his master of soldiers Stilicho. Gildo withheld the corn ships from Rome and declared allegiance to Stilicho's enemy Eutropius in Constantinople. Eutropius sent encouragement but no troops or money. The Roman Senate declared Gildo a public enemy (hostis publicus).

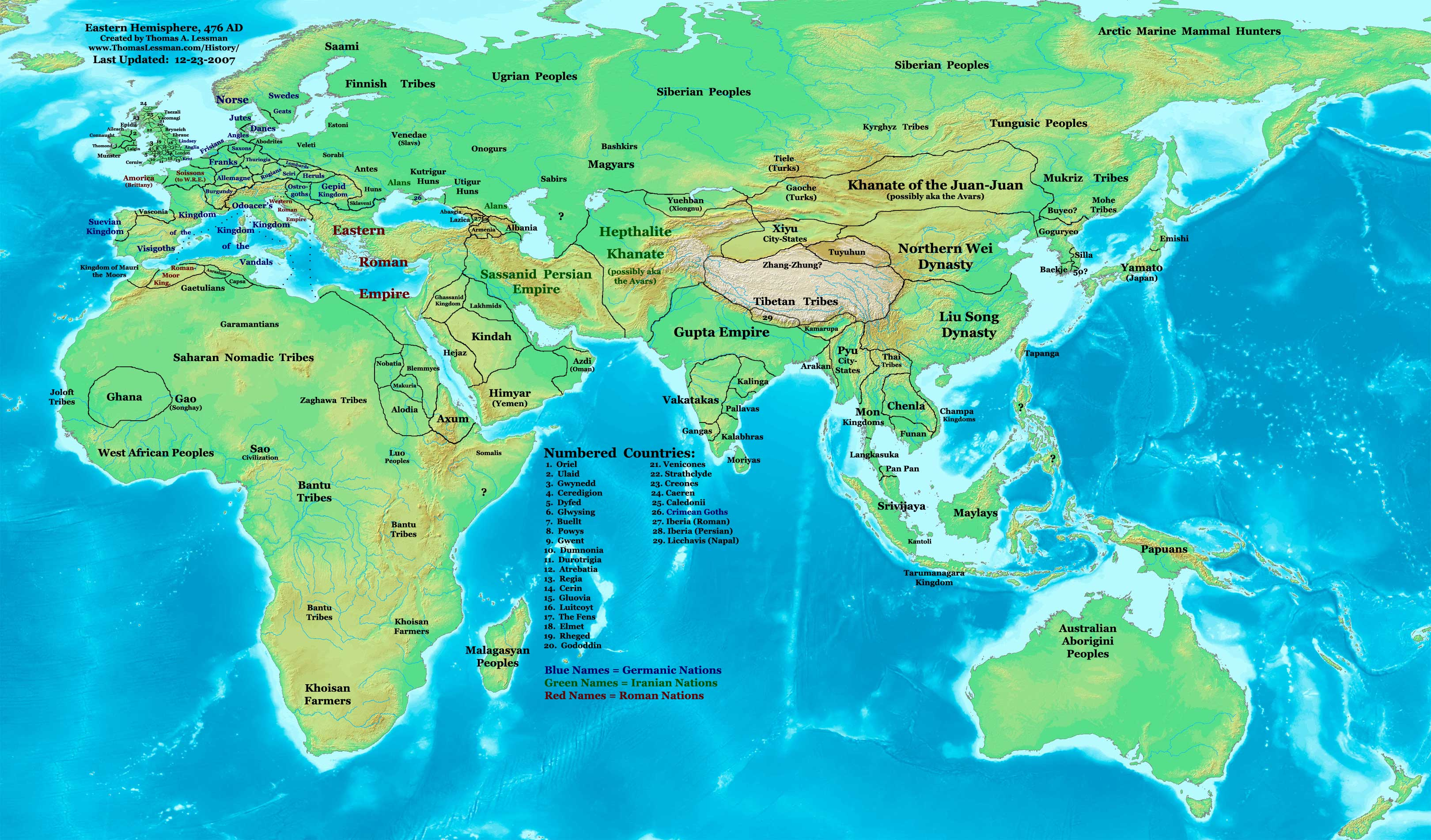
Eastern Hemisphere in 476 CE, showing the Mauri kingdoms after the fall of Rome

Gildo had another brother called Mascezel. At some point, Gildo executed Mascezel's children. Because of this, Mascezel helped the Romans defeat his brother's rebellion. With Mascezel's help, a Roman force of 5,000 men defeated Gildo and restored control over the Maghreb to the Western Empire. Stilicho then saw to it that Mascezel was eliminated. As a successor to Gildo, Stilicho placed his brother-in-law (Bathanarius) in charge of Mauretania’s military affairs in 401.

In the late 4th and early 5th centuries, large numbers of troops from the mobile imperial field army (the comitatus) were permanently stationed in the Maghreb to maintain order against the Mauri. A.H.M. Jones estimated that out of a total of 113,000 men in the comitatus 23,000 were stationed. These troops were in addition to the limitanei, the permanent border armies; but the limitanei were insufficient against the Mauri and so portions of the field army were placed alongside them. These troops were, according to Jones, then unavailable for their original purpose, which was to respond to barbarian invasions rapidly and wherever necessary.

In 411–412, the dux Libyarum (commander of Roman forces in Libya) was named Anysius. He is recorded as the commander of a war against the Austuriani Mauri. Synesius of Cyrene praised him for courage and effective management of the war.

In the year 412, the limitanei (permanently stationed border guards) of Cyrenaica needed help to resist attacks by the Austuriani group of Mauri. The Eastern Empire (at that time under regents for the young Emperor Theodosius II) sent a squadron of Unigardi barbarians. Synesius of Cyrene praised these barbarian federates and requested more.

== Byzantine period ==
After the fall of Rome, the Germanic kingdom of the Vandals ruled much of the area. Neither Vandal nor Byzantine could extend effective rule; the interior remained under Mauri (Berber) control. The Vandal army was not a standing army, and under the later Vandal kings (from Huneric to Gelimer), its strength deteriorated. No frontier army was set up to protect against Mauri incursions, so the Mauri encroached on the border areas of the kingdom. Later, when Belisarius reconquered the Maghreb for the Byzantine Empire in 533–534, he had little difficulty establishing rule over the Vandal Kingdom, but his successors had great difficulty controlling the Mauri, with some of them killed.

The Vandal king Huneric (477–484) exiled 4,966 Catholic bishops and priests into Mauri territory. Huneric was an Arian Christian and wanted only Arian clergy in the Vandal kingdom. The exile of Catholic clergy to the Mauri was thus Huneric's means of establishing Arian dominance in the Vandal kingdom of the Maghreb.

Hilderic (523–530) was not able to control Mauri attacks. In 530 he was deposed and replaced with Gelimer. The Byzantine Emperor, Justinian, used this as an excuse for invasion, as he had treaty relations with Hilderic. Justinian's general Belisarius quickly reestablished control over the former Roman province of Africa. King Gelimer sought refuge with a Mauri chieftain in the city of Medeus on Mount Papua. There, he was besieged for three months, until the city's suffering became too unbearable and he surrendered.

Otherwise, for the most part the Mauri did not resist Belisarius, but waited for the outcome of the battle and gave their allegiance to the Byzantines when it was done. The Vandals had lost a great deal of the original Roman territory to the Mauri, including all areas west of Caesarea. As soon as Belisarius left North Africa in 534, the Mauri began raiding again. The general Solomon fought a series of campaigns against them, putting a stop to the raids, until a Byzantine troop rebellion in 536. Following the troop mutiny the Mauri were able to raid again with impunity into Byzantine territory. Solomon was recalled and replaced with Germanus, who pacified the troop rebellion; then Solomon was recalled to fight against the Mauri again in 539. Due to the Mauri war and the troop rebellion, the Byzantines had difficulty collecting taxes from the newly conquered province. Justinian was preoccupied with wars against the Ostrogoths and Persians, and was unable to apply significant resources to controlling the Mauri, opening the door to further Mauri rebellions during the 540s and later.

Solomon succeeded in establishing Byzantine control over Mauri in Byzantine territory. However, his nephew Sergius invited the chiefs of a local Mauri tribe called the Levathi to a parley, and massacred them in 544. This led to a Mauri uprising, in which Solomon was killed. Justinian gave control of the Byzantine province to Sergius, but Sergius was incompetent, so Justinian sent Areobindus as general. The Byzantine duke of Numidia, Gontharis, wishing to become king of Africa, supported the Mauri in secret. The Byzantine troops were not being paid on time and were frequently unreliable. Gontharis occupied Carthage and killed Areobindus, only to be killed in turn by an Armenian Byzantine loyalist, Artabanes. Artabanes managed to regain control of the troops. His successor, John Troglita, defeated the Mauri revolt in 546–547. Following this defeat there were no more Mauri rebellions until 563, and this one was quickly suppressed.

A.H.M. Jones states that the grave difficulties experienced by the Byzantines in establishing control over the Mauri following the conquest of the Vandal kingdom, were in large part due to a failure to supply enough money and resources to the troops stationed in the coastal Maghreb, and this in turn due to the numerous wars being fought by Justinian elsewhere. The Mauri had taken large areas of land from the Vandals during the reign of the ineffective Hilderic, and the Byzantines never recovered these territories. Within the area of Byzantine control, almost every town was fortified, even far from the border areas. Many towns appear to have been reduced in size as populations concentrated within reduced fortified areas. In some towns the forum was fortified. All this suggests reduced prosperity and population and increased threat of war, most likely with the Mauri. Jones argues that because of the failure to commit enough resources to thoroughly pacify the region, it never contributed more taxes to Justinian's government than it cost in resources to maintain control. However, some Mauri were recruited into the Byzantine armies for service overseas, and at least two Mauri regiments were raised and assigned to Egypt.

A major Mauri revolt against Byzantine rule took place in 569, during the reign of Justin II, in which the praetorian prefect was killed. The following year, the magister militum was killed. In 571 another magister militum was killed. During the reign of the Emperor Maurice, 582–602 there were another two, smaller, Mauri rebellions.

== Islamic period ==
The Byzantine Empire would remain in control of the coastal Maghreb until the late 600s, when the Muslim conquest of the Maghreb ended Byzantine rule in the region. After the Muslim conquest of the Maghreb, there appears to have been continued Mauri resistance for an additional 50 years.

The Chronicle of 754 still mentions the Mauri; however, by the High Middle Ages the endonym ostensibly disappeared in Western documents. Christian sources began to apply from Mauri the term Moors to the Muslim populations of the Maghreb and the Iberian Peninsula.

== Revival of the name ==
In 1903, the modern state of Mauritania received its name as a French colony. French officials named the modern state after the ancient kingdom Mauretania, despite its geographical location considerably south of the ancient Mediterranean Kingdom (approximately 2,800 kilometers or 1,740 miles stretch between Tangier and Nouakchott).

== See also ==
- Roman-Mauri kingdoms
