= Gildonic War =

War in late antiquity

Date	398
Location	Roman province of Africa
Result	Imperial victory

Belligerents
Western Roman Empire	Berber Rebels; Support: Eastern Roman Empire

Commanders and leaders
Stilicho; Mascezel	Gildo

Units involved
Herculiani seniores Joviani seniores	

Strength
5,000	70,000 (Exaggerated)

Casualties and losses
None	Virtually none

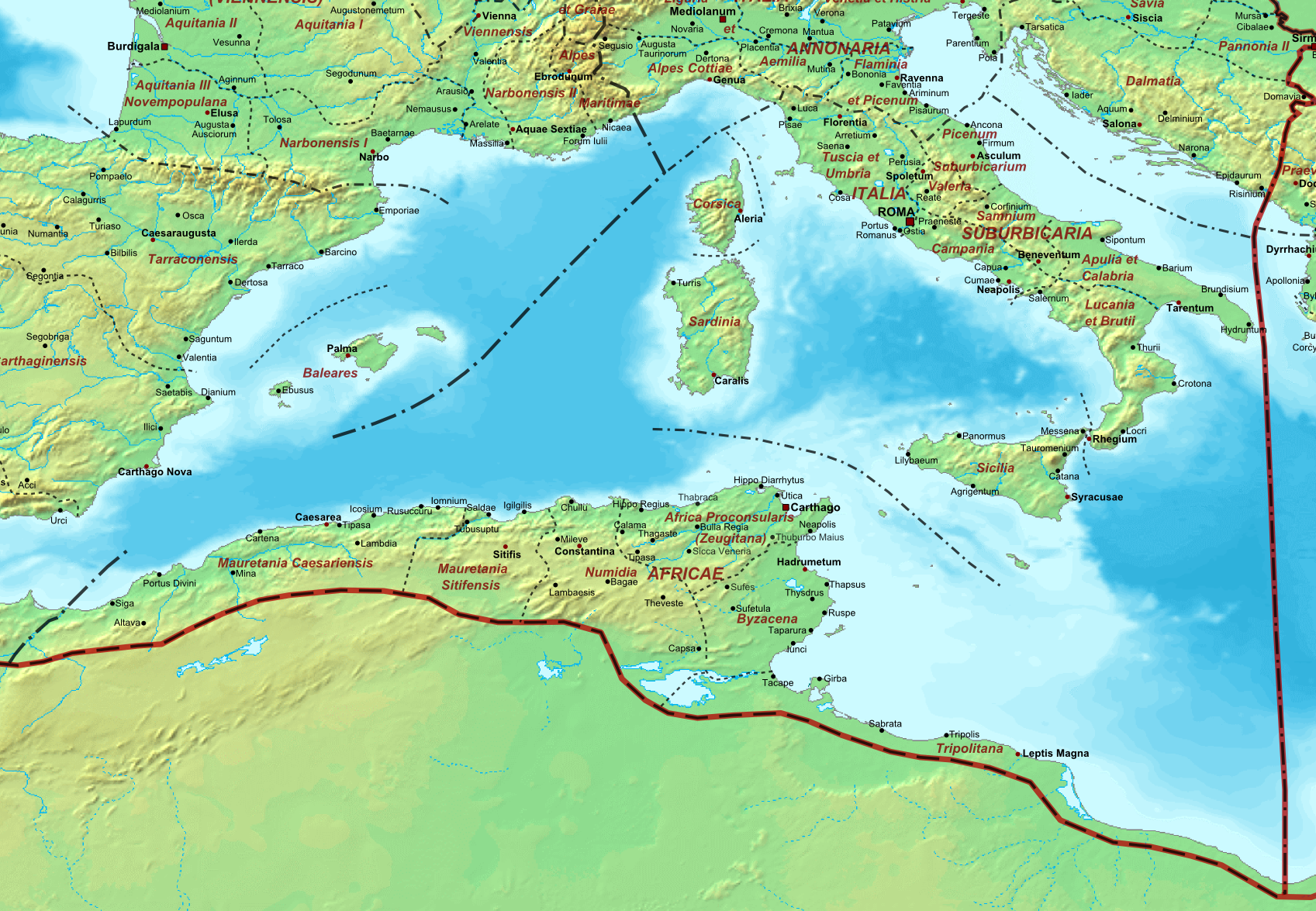
Diocese of Africa - AD 400

The Gildonic War (Latin: Bellum Gildonicum) was a rebellion in the year 398 led by Comes Gildo against Roman emperor Honorius. The revolt was subdued by Stilicho, the magister militum of the Western Roman Empire.

== Background ==
=== Revolt of Firmus ===
Gildo was a Berber by birth, the son of the immensely rich and prestigious Moorish lord Nubel. Under the reign of Valentinian I, Nubel's death resulted in a succession dispute between his sons, and Gildo's brother Firmus emerged victorious, after assassinating his brother Zamma. But when the governor of Africa, the unpopular count Romanus, disputed Firmus' claim, the latter used his influence, and the effects of the public outrage at Romanus' maladministration, to raise the province into open revolt, and only the swift response of the Imperial court and the energetic conduct of the general Theodosius prevented the province from becoming an independent monarchy of Firmus. The tyrant was captured, and the rebellion suppressed (373–374 AD); but the province remained unhappy. Romanus, whose exactions and corruption had given rise to the disorder, was not prosecuted for his crimes, and the malversations in the government continued.

=== Gildo governor of Africa ===
Several years later (386 AD), the son of emperor Theodosius I decided to pacify the province by appointing Firmus' brother Gildo, who had fought loyally and courageously for the Romans during his brother's rebellion, with the rank of military Count to restore justice in the province. However, he ruled the province as a bloodthirsty, cruel tyrant throughout the twelve years of his command (386–398 AD). This province was, after the change of Egypt province's breadbasket role to the Eastern Roman Empire, designated as the granary of Rome and Roman Italy. Gildo used Rome's dependence on this tribute to expand his authority, and the disorder in the Roman government after the death of Theodosius and the division of the Empire between his sons, Arcadius and Honorius, into separate spheres of east and west, contributed to secure Gildo's impunity, and provoked him at last into flagrant abuse of his power.

Gildo had failed to support Theodosius in the civil war of 394 against Eugenius, and consequently had awakened Theodosius' mistrust; the latter's death prevented retribution, but when the energetic general Stilicho had succeeded to the management of Honorius' affairs, Gildo could only avoid punishment by subordinating himself to the Eastern Empire, directed by the eunuch Eutropius. This constituted an act of treason against Honorius, who had officially received Africa as part of his portion. Stilicho, hoping to preempt the intervention of Eutropius, who might be expected to support Gildo's secession to the east, exploited the complaints of the inhabitants of Africa regarding Gildo's misrule to persuade the Senate to declare him "enemy of the State" and wrest Africa from him.

== War in Africa ==
Stilicho sent the brother of Gildo, Mascezel, together with some 5,000 Gallic veterans, to Northwest Africa. Edward Gibbon reports the units that formed the expeditionary force consisted of men from units whose names carried long histories of service to Rome:

These troops, who were exhorted to convince the world that they could subvert, as well as defend, the throne of an usurper, consisted of the Jovian, the Herculian, and the Augustan legions; of the Nervian auxiliaries; of the soldiers who displayed in their banners the symbol of a lion; and of the troops which were distinguished by the auspicious names of Fortunate and Invincible.

— Edward Gibbon, The History of the Decline and Fall of the Roman Empire

The loyalist army was countered by a force of some 70,000, consisting of the Roman legions already present in Africa, complemented with a huge cavalry of mercenaries from Gaetulia and Ethiopia.

As Mascezel approached with offers of peace, he first encountered the standard bearer of one of the African legions. When he refused to yield, Mascezel struck him on the arm with his sword. As a result, the standard-bearer lowered the standard, which was incorrectly perceived by the troops as a sign of submission. All other standard-bearers of the frontline followed the example, and the disaffected cohorts turned against Gildo and began shouting the name of their new commander. The Berber mercenaries were amazed at the disloyalty of their Roman allies and took to a tumultuous flight.

== Aftermath ==
The honour of an easy and almost bloodless victory fell to Mascezel, while Gildo tried to flee in a small boat, hoping to reach the friendly shores of the Eastern Roman Empire. However, unfavourable winds drove the vessel back to the harbour of Tabraca, where the inhabitants were eager to display their new loyalty by throwing Gildo in the dungeons. To avoid the revenge of his brother (Gildo had the two sons of Mascezel murdered), Gildo committed suicide by hanging.

Mascezel died shortly after his brother. On his triumphant return to the Roman court in Mediolanum, Stilicho received him with much ceremony and jealousy. He drowned when he, in the company of Stilicho, crossed a bridge and fell in the water, either by accident, or pushed on orders of Stilicho.
