= Firmus =

Possible Roman imperial usurper (died 273)

- Died: 273
- Known for: Usurper during the reign of Aurelian

According to the Historia Augusta, Firmus (died 273) was a usurper of Egyptian origin during the reign of Aurelian. The apparently contradictory accounts of his life and the man himself are considered by some historians to be a complete fabrication, perhaps based on the later Firmus.

== Historia Augusta account ==
According to the Historia Augusta ("Firmus"), Firmus was a man of great wealth. He had his house fitted with square panels of glass, and owned a huge library. His commercial relationships involved Blemmyes, Saracens, and India. He had two elephant tusks, which later Aurelian projected to use as a basis for a statue to Jupiter and which were actually given as a present by Carinus. Physically, Firmus was noteworthy, being huge and very strong. Firmus was notably also a heavy drinker and could eat quite a bit. The Historia Augusta states that he once consumed an entire ostrich in one day, and even beat one of Aurelian's standard bearers and notorious drinkers in a drinking contest, draining two buckets of wine while remaining completely sober. The importance and threat of Firmus' revolt is related to the interruption of the Egyptian grain supply to Rome.
