= Gildo =

Roman general

- Roman usurper (397 – 31 July 398)

King of the Quinquegentiani
- Reign: 374–398
- Predecessor: Firmus
- Successor: Mascezel
- Born: 340's Mauretania Caesariensis
- Died: 31 July 398; Tabarka
- Issue: Salvina
- House: Quinquegentiani
- Father: Nuvel
- Mother: Nonica

Gildo (died 398) was a Berber-Roman general and the prince son of King Nubel, regulus (kinglet) of the nation of the Jubaleni (Jubalenses) in the province of Mauretania Caesariensis.

He is best known for having participated in the suppression of his brother Firmus' revolt alongside the general Theodosius the Elder, which allowed him to rise through the ranks and be named Count of Africa in 385, He revolted against Honorius and the Western Roman Empire (Gildonic war), but was defeated and possibly killed himself or was assassinated.

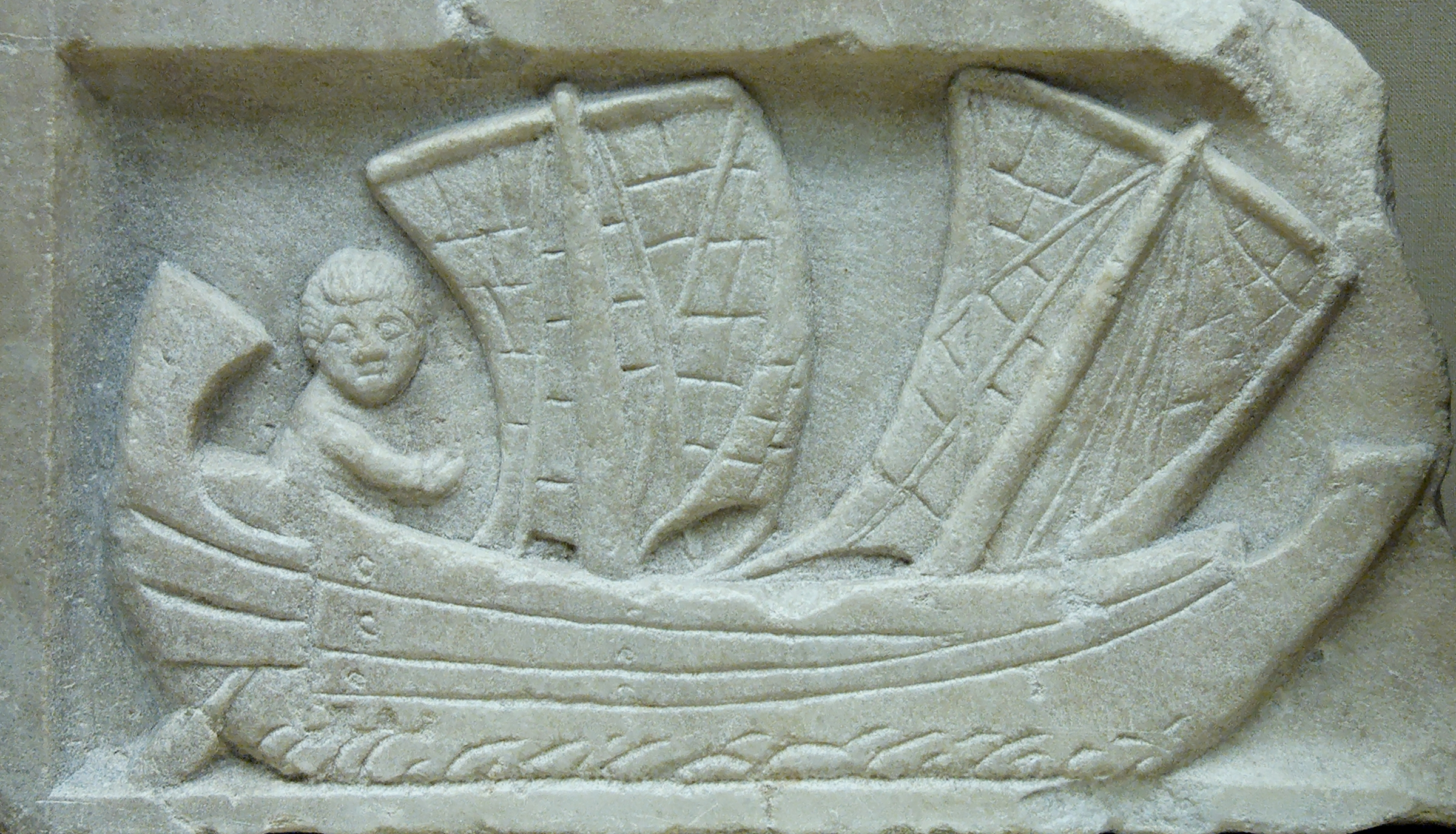
Corbita, a sailing merchant ship used to supply Rome, bas-relief found at Carthage, c. 200.

== Etymology ==
The name "Gildo" may have been the Ancient and Modern Berber root "GLD" or "agellid" which means chief or king.

== History ==
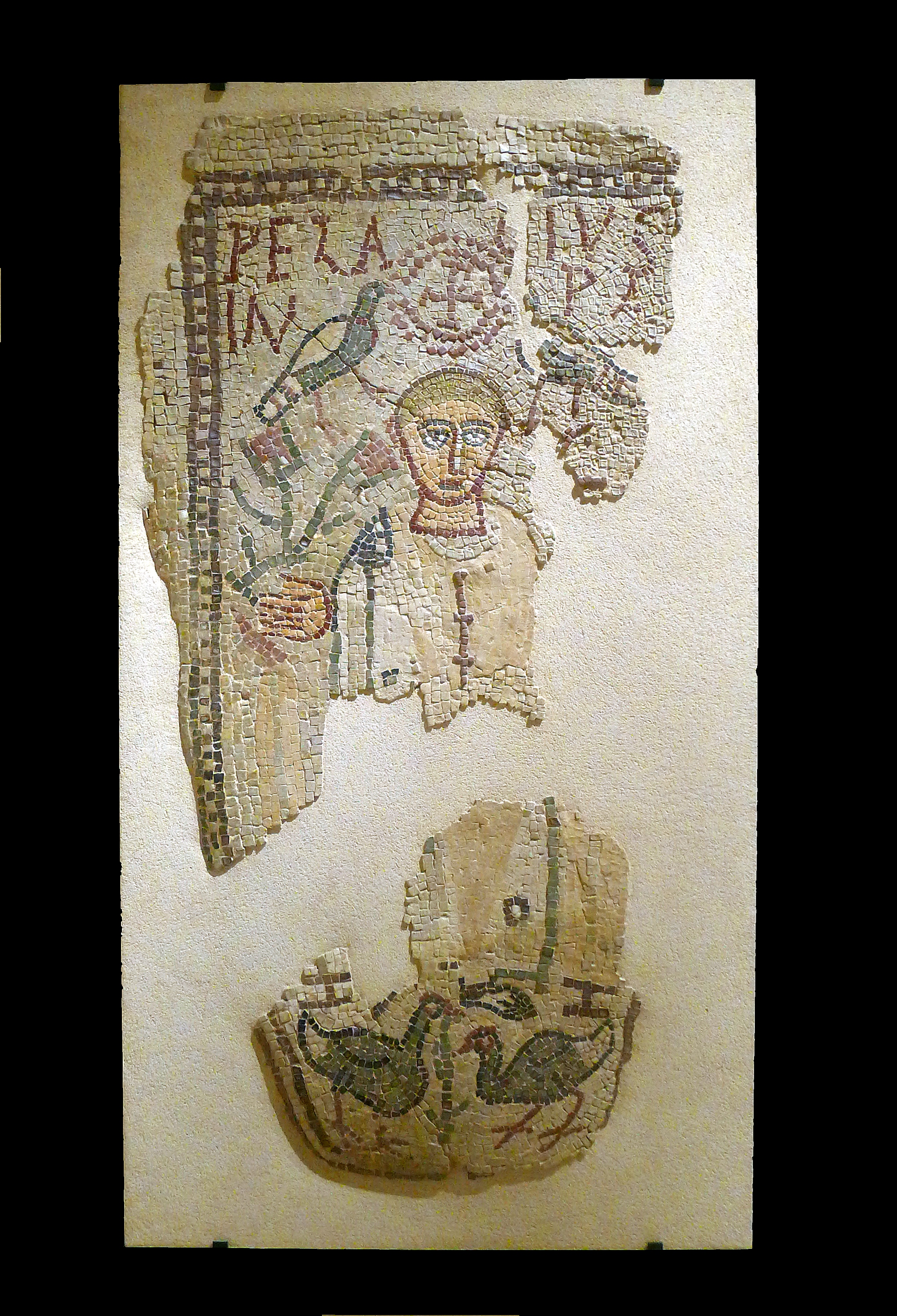
Mosaic of Gildo's tomb with the Christian cross, found in Tabarka, late 4th-early 5th century.

Gildo was probably born in the 340s in Mauretania Caesariensis, a Romanised Berber by birth. Being a son of King Nubel (regulus per nationes Mauricas), he was brother to Firmus. His other brothers were called Mascezel, Mazuca, Sammac, and Dius. He had a sister named Cyria. According to a hypothesis of Stéphane Gsell that was later resumed and developed by Gabriel Camps, Nubel should indeed be identified with Flavius Nuvel, officer of the Roman army, commander of a cavalry unit, the equites Armigeri junior, who with his wife Nonnica (or Monnica) had a basilica built around the middle of the fourth century, housing a relic of the True Cross.

When Firmus revolted against Valentinian I (375), Gildo stayed loyal to his emperor and, at the suppression of the revolt, was rewarded with the immense patrimony confiscated from his brother.

In 386, Theodosius I appointed Gildo Comes Africae and Magister utriusque militiae per Africam, as reward for his support to his father Theodosius the Elder in the suppression of Firmus' revolt. The Africa Province was ruled by Gildo with some sort of independence.

A little later, before 393, he even bore the title of "Count and Master of the two militias for Africa", with the official rank of vir spectabilis.

After the death of Theodosius and the rise to the throne of his sons, Arcadius and Honorius, Gildo saw an increase in his importance: the Africa Province, in fact, became entrusted with the grain supply to the city of Rome, a role played by Egypt until the split of the Empire into two halves. Incited by the political machinations of the eunuch Eutropius, Gildo seriously entertained the notion of joining the Eastern Roman Empire by pledging allegiance to Arcadius. The possibility of losing the granary of Rome led to civil turmoil in the city, and acting on an appeal by Stilicho, the Roman Senate declared Gildo an "enemy of the State" and started a war against him.

At the same time, Gildo had a quarrel with his brother Mascezel, who was obliged to flee to the court of Honorius; Gildo took revenge on his brother by killing his two sons. Mascezel was entrusted by Stilicho with the command of the war against Gildo and given the command of a chosen body of Gallic veterans, who had lately served under the standard of Eugenius. Landed with his few troops in Africa, he camped in front of a large Moorish camp. Despite its superiority, Gildo's army melted in front of the superior discipline of Mascezel's army.

After the defeat, Gildo was obliged to flee in a small boat, hoping to reach the friendly shores of the Eastern Roman Empire. However, unfavourable winds drove the vessel back to the harbour of Tabraca, where the inhabitants were eager to display their new loyalty by throwing Gildo into the dungeons. But taken over by Mascezel's forces, he was arrested and died on July 31, 398, executed or forced to commit suicide.

After his defeat, Gildo's estates were confiscated and became imperial property. They were so vast that a government position, the Count of Gildo's Patrimony (comes Gildoniaci patrimonii), was created to manage them.

Gildo's family had a marriage connection with the Roman imperial family. Gildo had a daughter named Salvina. Salvina married Nebridius, who was the nephew of Flaccilla. Flaccilla was the first wife of the Emperor Theodosius I.
