= Firmus (4th-century usurper) =

Berber usurper of the Western Roman Empire

- King, Usurper of the Roman Empire

King of the Quinquegentiani
- Reign: 370–374
- Predecessor: Zammac
- Successor: Gildo
- Born: 4th century Thénia, Mauretania Caesariensis
- Died: 374; Caprarienses montes Mauretania Caesariensis
- Father: Nuvel
- Religion: Donatism

Firmus (died 375) was a Berber Numidian prince of the Quinquegentiani tribe as well as a Roman usurper under Valentinian I.

Firmus was the son of the Berber Jubaleni prince Nubel, a powerful Roman military officer, as well as a wealthy Christian. When Nubel died, Firmus killed his half-brother Zammac, who had illegitimately appropriated Nubel's wealth, and became successor to his father.

Between 372 and 375, Firmus revolted against the comes Africae Romanus, who was a supporter of Zammac. The misbehaviour of Romanus, who had neglected protection from African tribes to Roman cities that had refused the payment of bribes, had worsened the situation in Africa Province in the 360s. The revolt of Firmus against Romanus forced Valentinian to take action against both his officer and the African rebel.

When Valentinian sent Count Theodosius the Elder (father of Theodosius I) to depose Romanus, Firmus initially professed his willingness to compromise, and appeared on the verge of reaching an honorable settlement with Valentinian's capable general, but a plot to assassinate Theodosius and carry on the revolt was discovered by the tribune Mollius Tener and Firmus was forced to flee.

Firmus attempted to found an independent kingdom from Roman Africa. Quickly obtaining support from the Berber tribes, including the Abanni and the Caprarienses, he presented Theodosius with the prospect of a protracted guerilla war against the elusive barbarians of the Numidian desert, such as Rome had faced against Jugurtha and Tacfarinas in preceding centuries. However, Theodosius pursued the war with rapidity and success, advancing into the desert with a mobile column of light infantry, and forcing Firmus to flee from one tribe to another as all successively surrendered to the Romans. Ultimately, Igmazen, king of the Isaflenses, was induced by fear or defeat to surrender Firmus to the Romans. However, the usurper managed to strangle himself before Theodosius could secure him, disappointing the Romans of a proper revenge.

His body was transported, allegedly on the back of a camel, on Theodosius' return to Sitifi, as proof of the end of the revolt.

Firmus supported the Donatists against the Nicene faith. Firmus ordered the killing of the Nicene inhabitants of Rusuccuru, and after his death, Valentinian issued laws against the Donatists.

It is also possible that this Firmus was the basis on which the author of Historia Augusta modeled the improbable Firmus, usurper against Aurelian.

Firmus also appears in the hagiographic 'Passio sanctae Salsae' in which, while besieging the city of Tipasa, he tries to secure the support of the local martyr St Salsa only to be rejected and eventually defeated.

His brother, Gildo, led another revolt known as the Gildonic War in the year 398.
