= Quinquegentiani =

- Ancient Libyan confederation
- Tribes of ancient Kabylia.
- Ethnicity: Ancient Libyans (Berbers)
- Location: Kabylia
- Branches: Isaflenses; Iesalenses; Iubaleni; Massinissenses; Tindenses
- Language: Old Libyan, African Latin
- Religion: Libyan religion

The Quinquegentiani were a Classical Age Berber tribal confederation inhabiting the lands between the cities of Saldae and Rusuccuru, a region which is now known as Kabylia. Their territory laid at the eastern border of the Roman province of Mauretania Caesariensis, and although they were officially under Roman rule, they acted very autonomously.

== Etymology ==
The ethnonym Quinquegentiani means "People of the Five Tribes" in Latin. This suggests that the Quinquegentiani were a confederation of several different Berber tribes instead of a single tribe.

== Divisions ==
Since the five tribes which in the 2nd to the 3rd century occupied this region are known. The constituent tribes of the Quinquegentiani were probably: the Toulensii, the Baniouri, the Tyndenses, the Nababes and the Massinissenses.

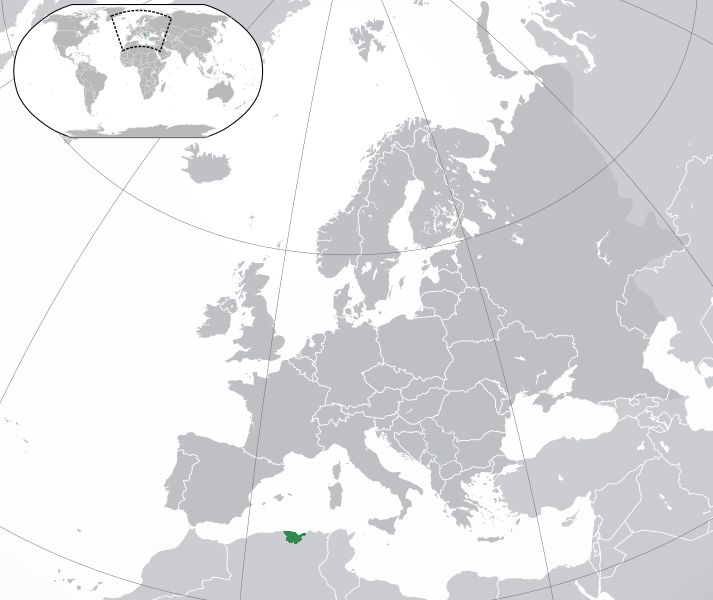
A map showing the Kabylie-region, in which the Quinquegentiani lived before their rebellion.

== History ==
In AD 253, the Quinquegentiani, who had formed a confederation with the Bavares and the Fraxinenses, two other Berber tribes from the region, started attacking and pillaging Roman and Roman-aligned settlements in Numidia. These hostilities led to a Roman intervention, but because of more urgent troubles, such as the death of Emperor Aemilianus and the imperial succession, the war lasted for a decade and the Romans finally managed to restore order in AD 262. The tribal confederation was then disbanded and the tribes were driven back to their native lands.

The Quinquegentiani once again rebelled against Roman rule in AD 289. This time, they were once again backed by the Bavares. The rebellion was successful at first, but in 297, the Roman forces of Maximianus Herculius started a bloody offensive, which drove the rebels back to their native lands in the Atlas and Grand Kabyle Mountains; however, Maximianus wasn't satisfied with this, and in early 298 he invaded their native lands to inflict a bigger punishment upon the rebels; by using scorched earth tactics and by killing as many as he could, he supposedly drove the Quinquegentiani into the Sahara. By spring 298, the war was concluded, and the Quinquegentiani disappeared from Roman records.
