= Jovinus (consul) =

Roman general and consul (c. 310-370 CE)

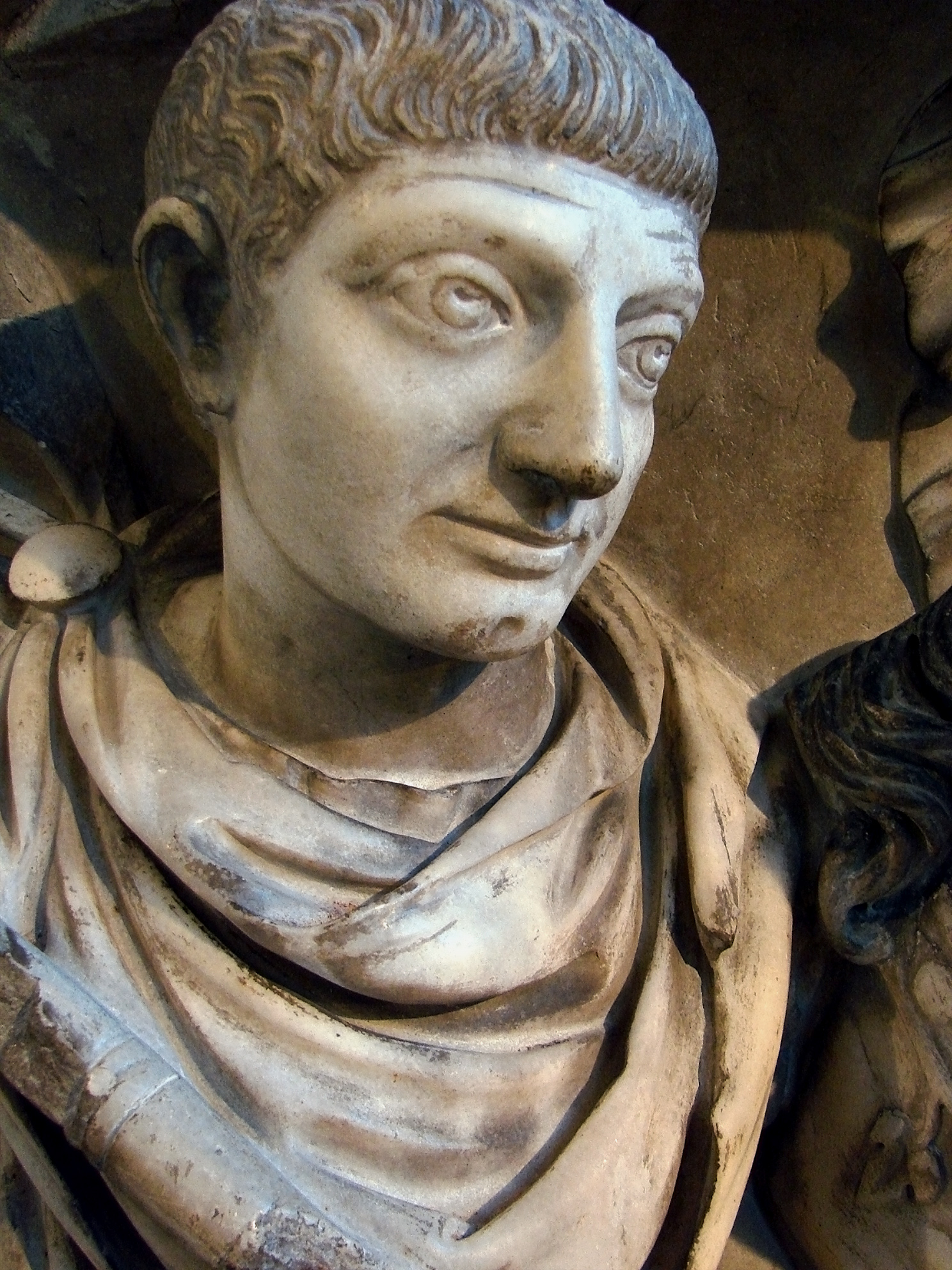
- Portrait assumed to be of Jovinus, on his sarcophagus Reims, musée Saint-Remi.

Flavius Jovinus (c. 310 - 370 AD) was a Roman general and consul of the Western Roman Empire. He was of Gallic or Germanic origin and was both born and buried in Durocortorum, modern day Reims.

== Biography ==
Jovinus first appears in the historical record as an officer of unspecified rank in emperor Julian's army. He, along with one other officer, commanded the one-third of Julian's army sent into Italy from Gaul. Later during the same campaign he was promoted to the rank of magister equitum and besieged Aquileia until the war's end. After the war, he was one of the judges at the Trials of Chalcedon.

When emperor Julian invaded the Persian Empire, he left Jovinus in Gaul. Julian died on the Persian campaign, and his successor, Jovian, tried to oust Jovinus because he feared his popularity with the troops could allow him to usurp imperial power. However, Jovian's appointee declined the promotion, and then Lucillianus, another officer, decided to go to Gaul and take up the position. Contemporary historian Ammianus Marcellinus criticizes Lucillianus for immediately putting a civil official on trial for corruption, without first securing the safety of the province or the loyalty of the soldiers. This official fled to the army and claimed that Julian was still alive and Jovian was trying to usurp his power, so the soldiers rioted and killed Lucillianus. After all this effort and chaos to dismiss him, Jovinus took charge, calmed the soldiers, and convinced them to support Jovian. As thanks, Jovian finally reconfirmed Jovinus as magister equitum in Gaul.

Jovian soon died, and his successors, Valentinian I and Valens, divided the empire between them, with Valentinian ruling in the west. Jovinus was made a magister militum in Valentinian's army, and led a campaign against the Alemanni in 365-66. He engaged the Alemanni, who had crossed the Rhine, in three notable battles: one at Scarponna (Dieulouard), another along a river (probably the Moselle), and a final encounter at Châlons-en-Champagne. He was elected to the prestigious consulship in 367, together with another magister, Lupicinus.

After converting to Christianity, Jovinus sponsored the construction of the church of Saint-Agricole and Saint-Vital on the site of the present abbey church of Saint-Nicaise de Reims. He was buried in this church in 370 in a white Marmara marble sarcophagus imported from Italy. This sarcophagus measures 1.48m x 2.85m x 1.33m and weighs approximately 2 metric tons. On its front is a relief of a hunting scene, with Jovinus shown on horseback, spearing a lion. It has been in the Musée d'Archéologie de Saint-Rémi in Reims since 1958. However, its attribution to Jovinus has been disputed since 1880.

Jovinus is also credited with the founding of Joigny (Joviniacum).

Sarcophagus of Jovinus, Reims, musée Saint-Remi.

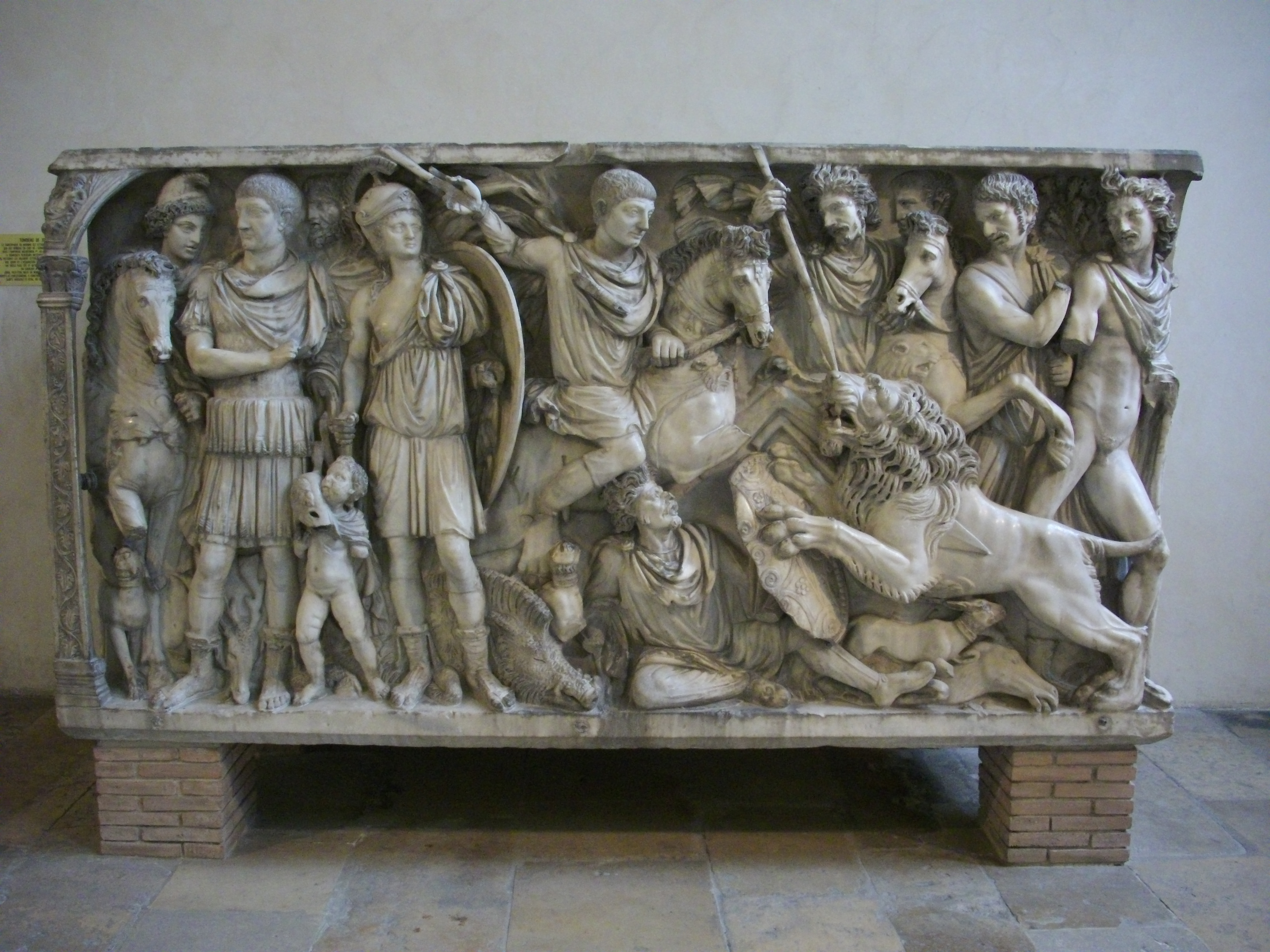
View of the whole sarcophagus.

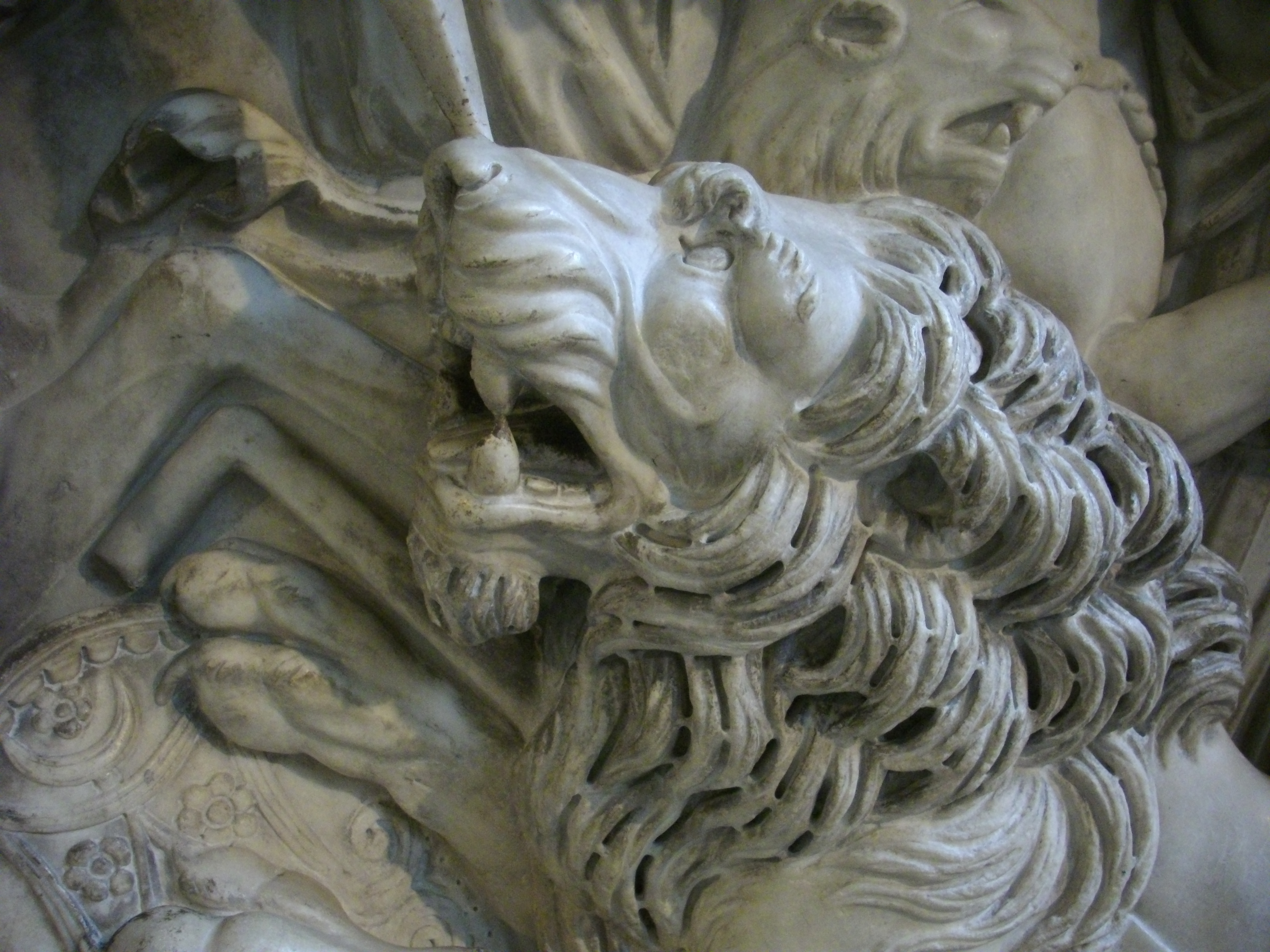
Detail of a lion.

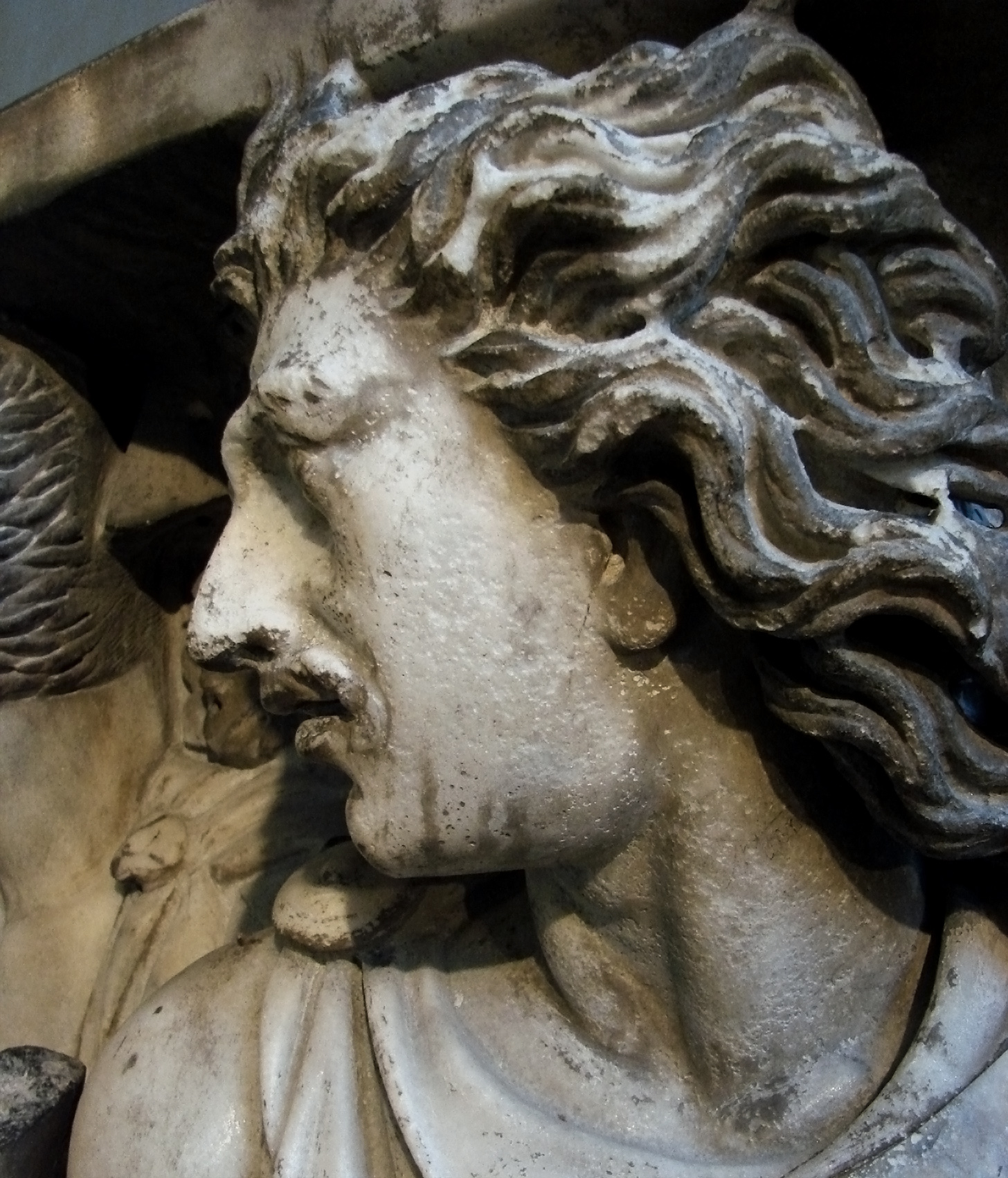
Detail of one of the horsemen.

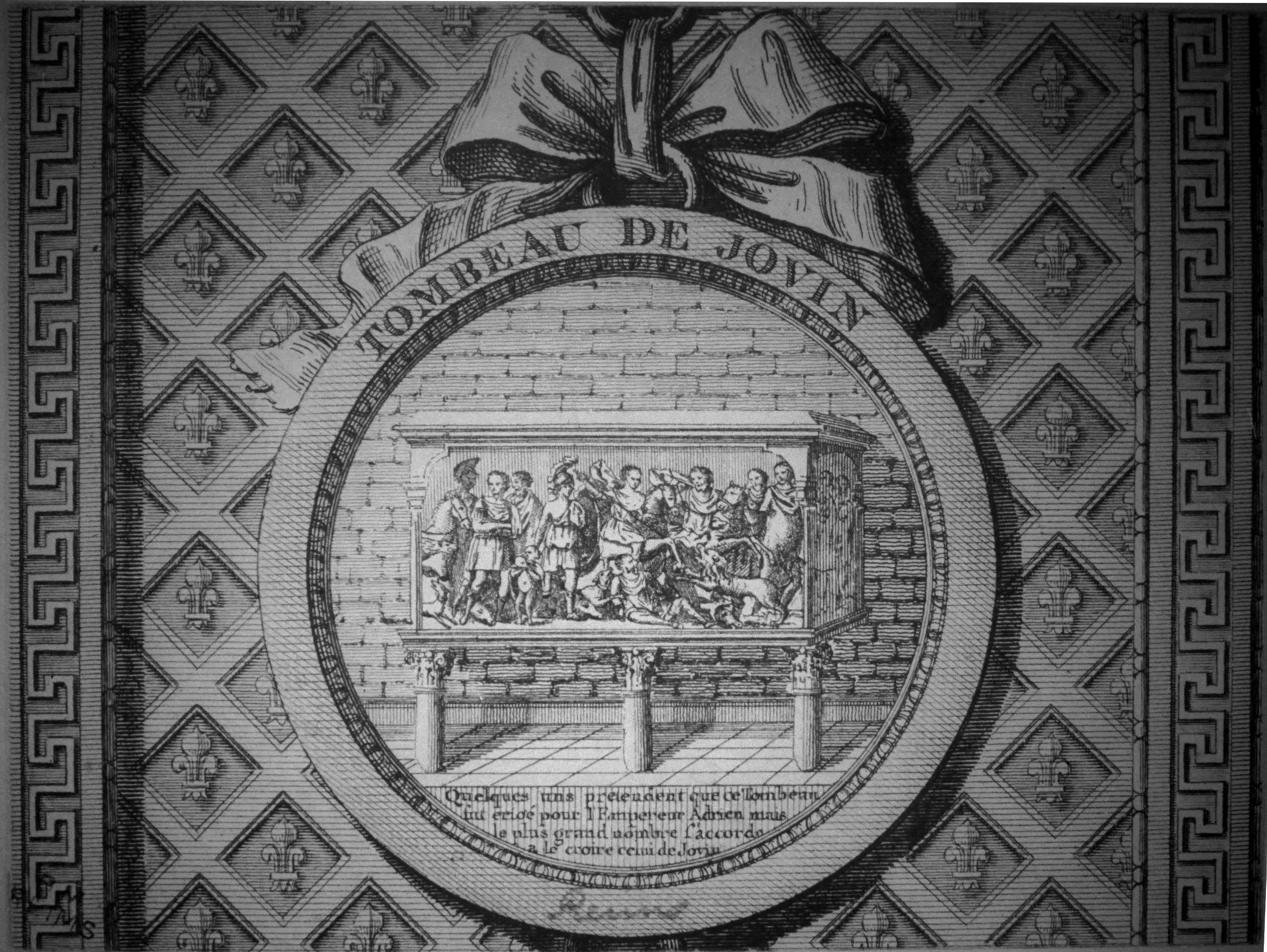
The tomb of Jovinus as it was presented in the old church of Saint-Nicaise in Reims, gravure (1878), Reims, Carnegie library (Reims)

== See also ==
- Durocortorum
- Reims
- Roman Gaul

Political offices
Preceded by Gratian; Dagalaifus	Roman consul 367; With: Lupicinus	Succeeded by Valentinian Augustus; Valens Augustus
