= Lupicinus (magister equitum) =

Roman army officer

Flavius Lupicinus was a Roman military commander in the 4th century AD. He was appointed magister equitum in 357, but fell out of favour when he refused to side with Julian when the army declared him Augustus. After Julian's death, he was appointed magister equitum per orientes in 363. In 365, he was the senior commander in the emperor Valens' campaign against the usurper Procopius, and following the defeat of Procopius was made consul in 367.

== Military service ==
During the reign of Emperor Constantius II, Lupicinus was named magister equitum (commander of cavalry) in 357. Lupicinus took a leading role in the campaign of Emperor Julian along the Rhine against the Salian Franks and the Alemanni. In one instance, he devised a successful plan whereby 300 Roman troops secretly crossed the Rhine at night and attacked the Alemannic camp on the opposite bank. This allowed the main body of Julian's army to cross and quickly defeat and accept the surrender of the five confederated Alemannic kings.

The Roman Diocese of Britain was invaded from the north and from Hibernia to the west in 360. Lupicinus was dispatched there by Julian to stave off the attacks. However, his order came at the same time that Constantius II ordered Lupicinus east against the Persians. Not wishing to march east, Julian's army mutinied and acclaimed him Augustus over Constantius II. Refusing to side with Julian in the imminent civil war, Lupicinus fell out of favor and was arrested by Julian's troops. After the death of Emperor Julian in 363, Julian's successor Jovian brought Lupicinus back into service and appointed him Magister Equitum per Orientum (Commander of the Cavalry of the East). Lupicinus continued in this command after the death of Jovian in 364 and on through the reign of the newly-elected Emperor Valentinian and Valentinian's brother Valens.

In 365, there was an attempted usurpation of the eastern portion of the Empire by Procopius. Lupicinus was Emperor Valens' senior commander against the rebel troops holding Asia Minor. After a chain of victories and the overthrow of Procopius in 366, Lupicinus was rewarded with the Consulship the following year. His consular colleague was the western military commander, Jovinus.

Lupicinus is not to be confused with Lupicinus, a general in the Gothic wars of the 370s.

Preceded by Gratian; Dagalaifus	Roman consul 367 with Jovinus	Succeeded by Valentinian Augustus II; Valens Augustus II
