= Porte de Mars =

Ancient Roman triumphal arch in France

Coordinates: 49°15′38.2″N 4°1′47.8″E

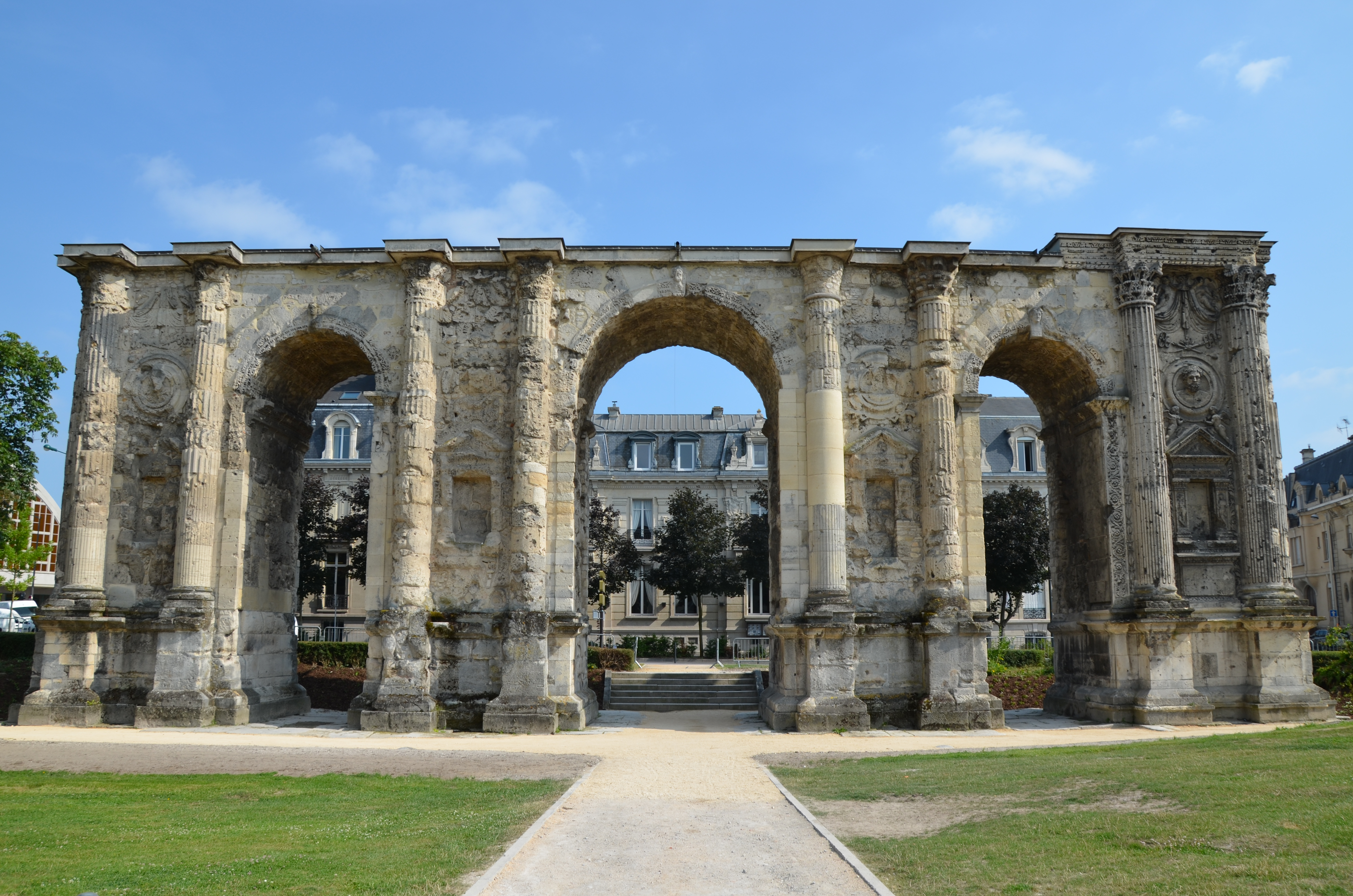
The Porte de Mars

Porte de Mars (Gate of Mars) is an ancient Roman triumphal arch in Reims, France. It dates from the third century AD, and was the widest arch in the Roman world.

== The Arch ==
The monumental Mars Gate dates from the first part of the 3rd century and is the only remaining of four gates that gave access to the Gallo-Roman town known as Durocortorum. The arch stands 32 metres long and 13 metres high, with three wide arched openings. It was named after a nearby temple to Mars. The arch has many highly detailed carvings on its exterior and on the ceilings of its three passageways, including Romulus and Remus, farm workers, and Leda and the swan. Local folklore says that the inhabitants of Reims built the arch in gratitude when the Romans brought major roads through their city. It became part of the castle of the archbishops in 1228, which was destroyed in 1595, leaving the arch, with the openings blocked, part of the city walls. Rediscovered in 1667, it was not fully revealed until the dismantling of the city walls in 1844–54.

== Gallery ==
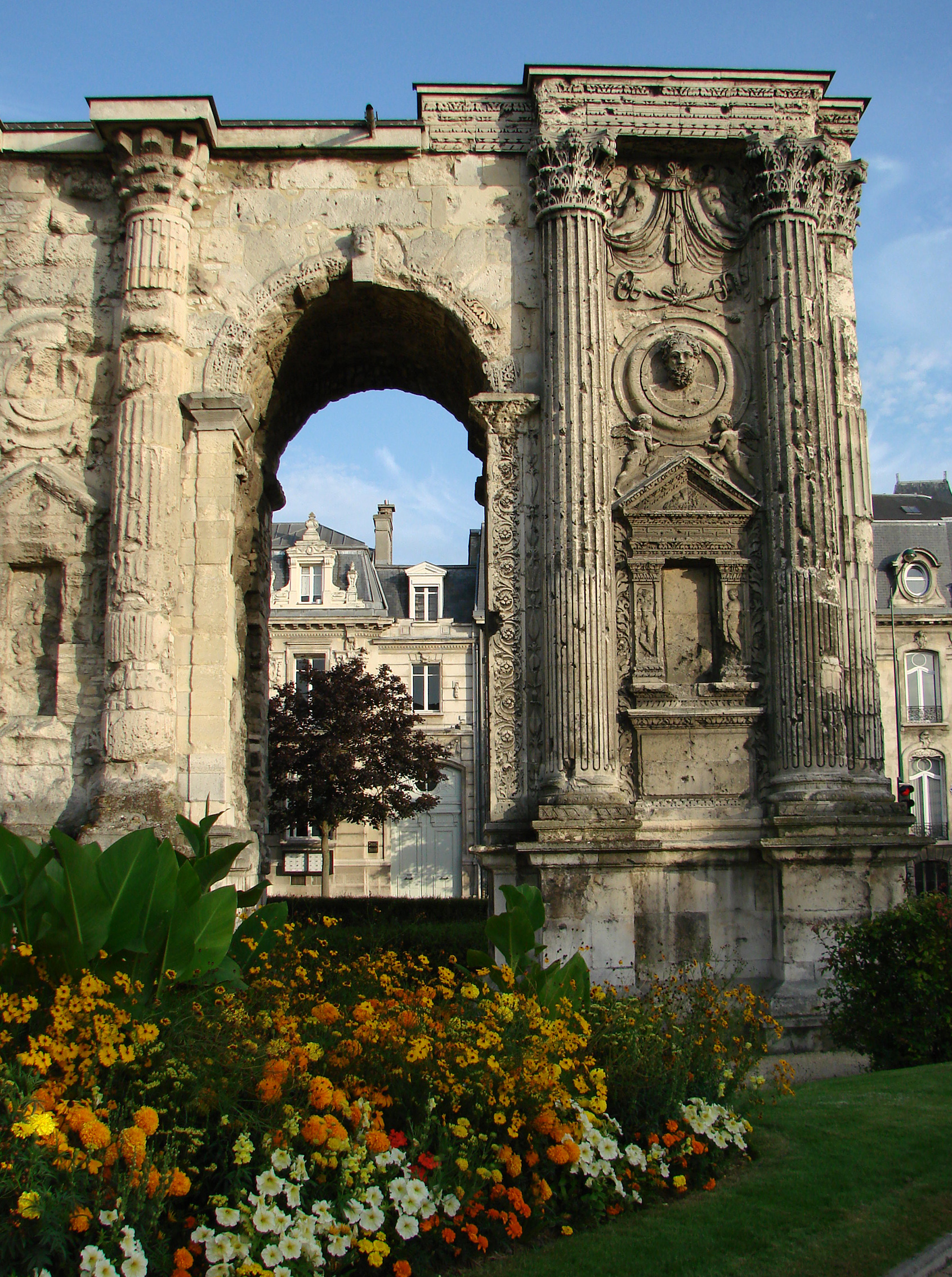

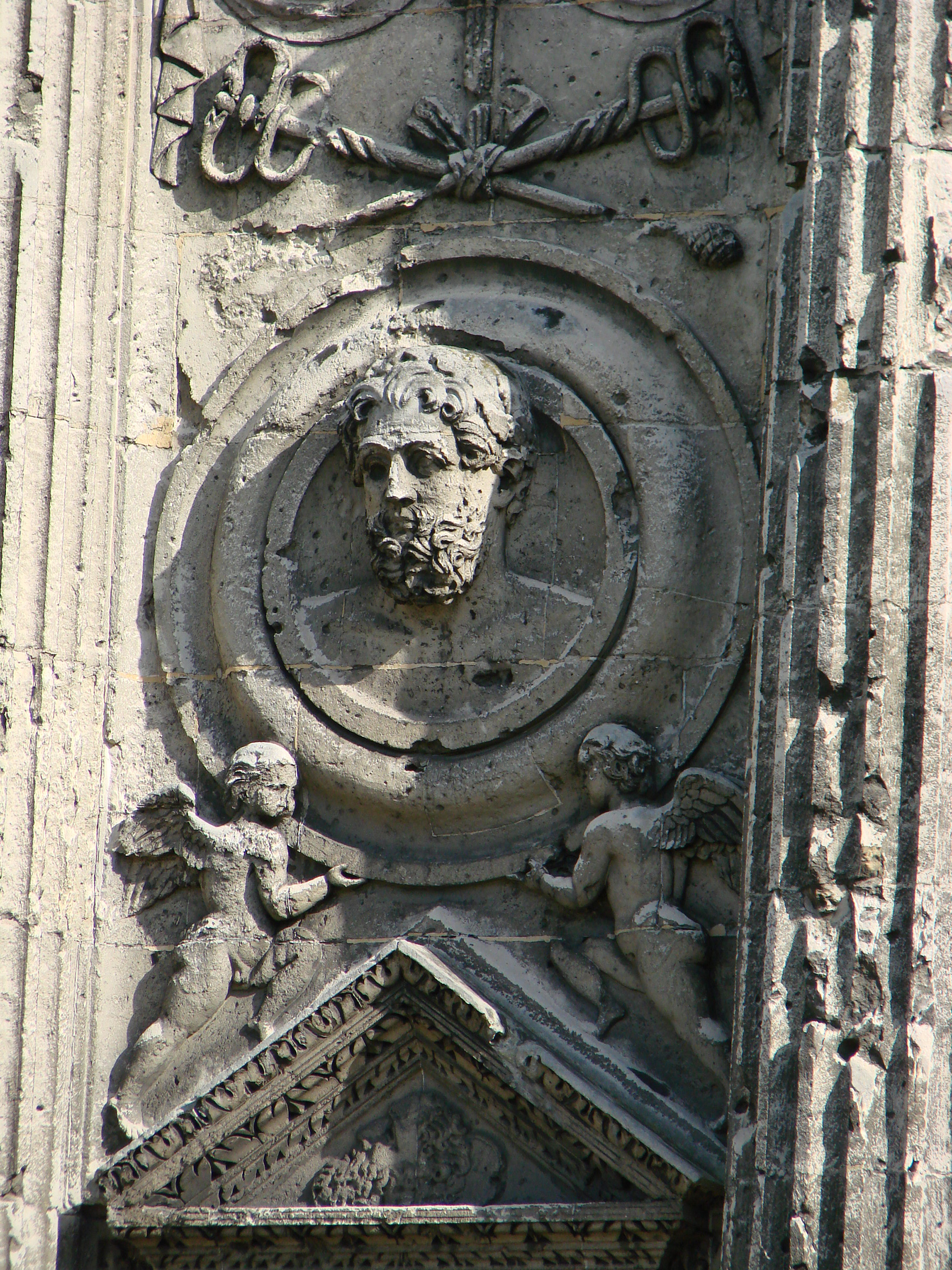

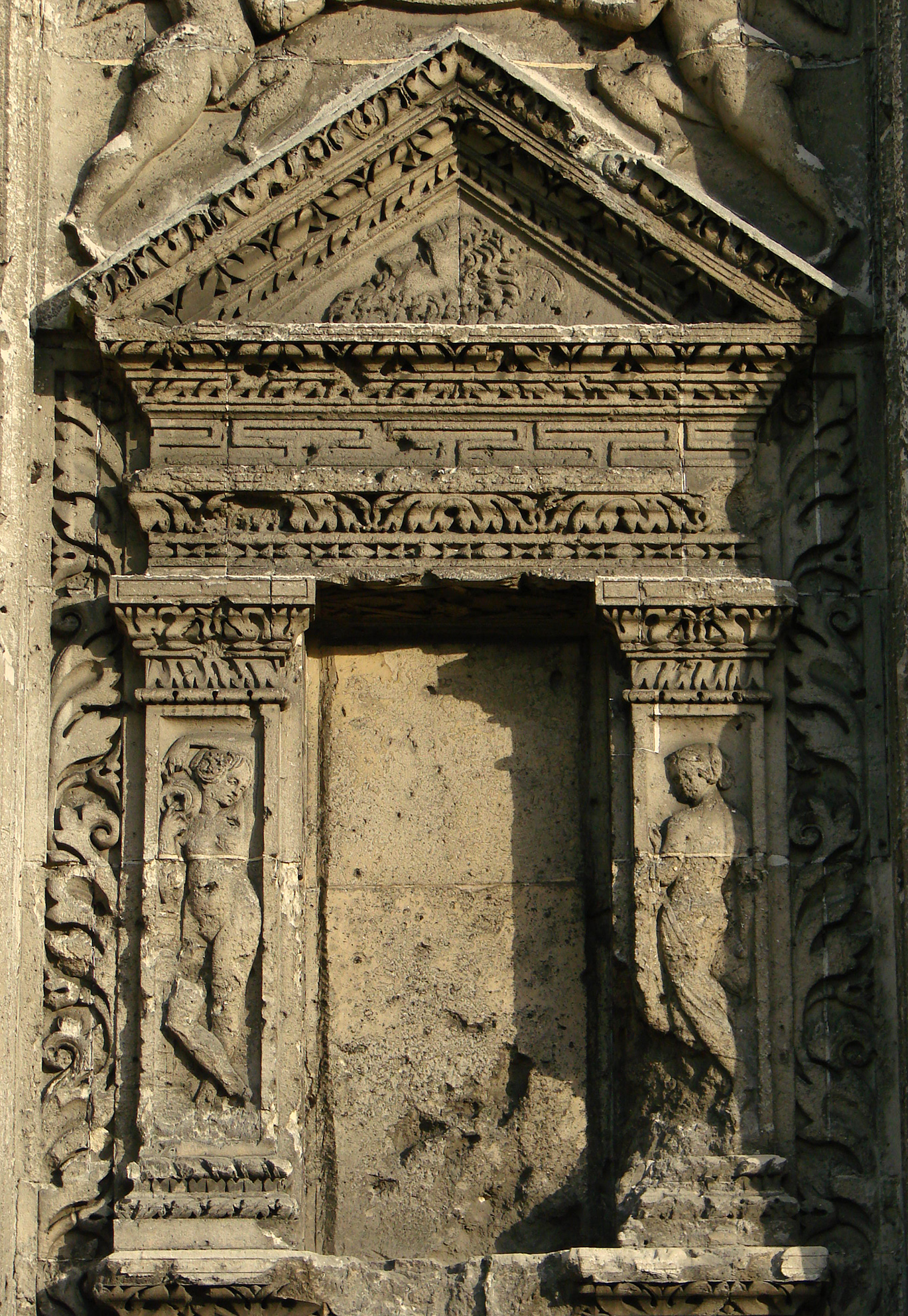

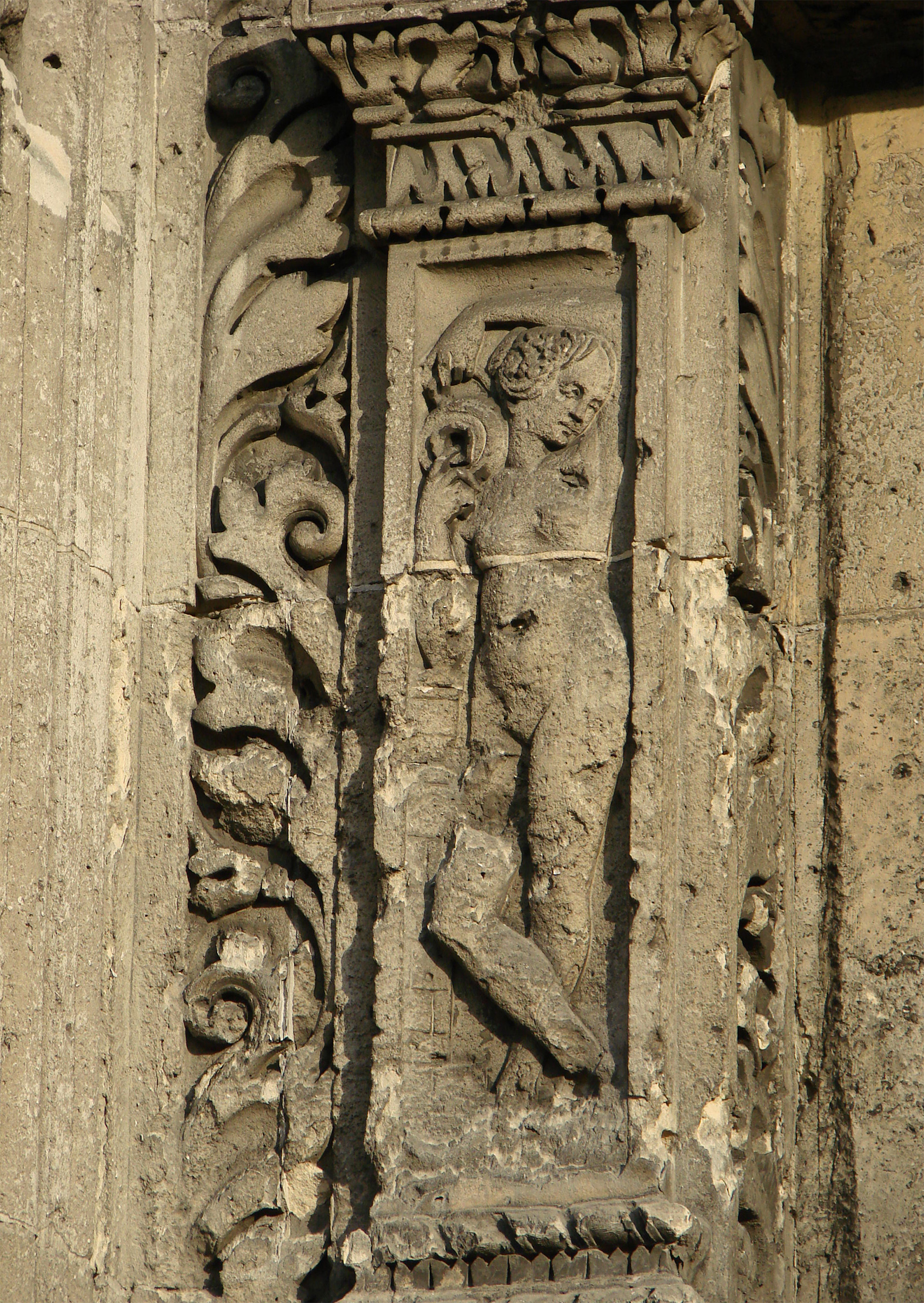

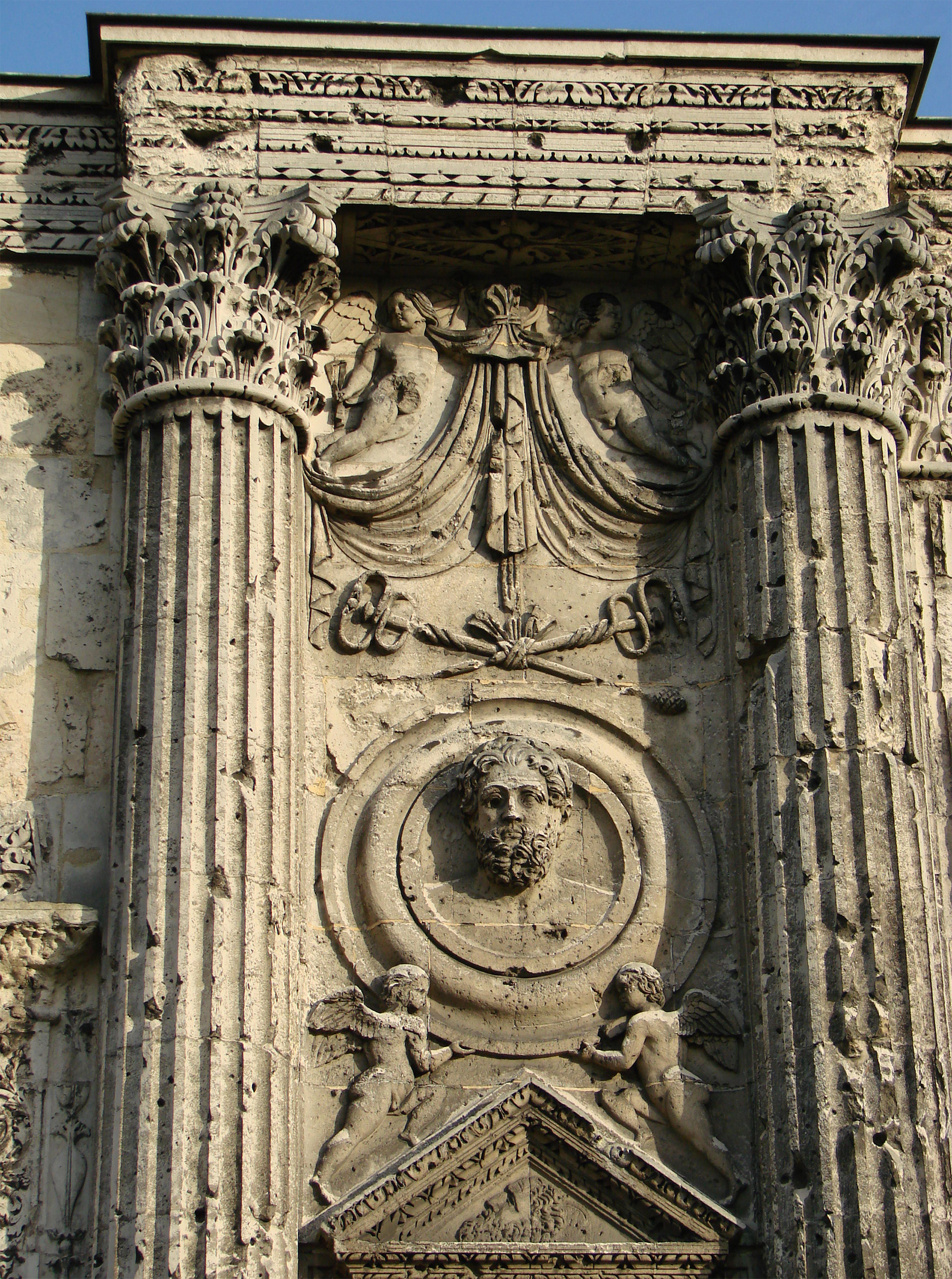

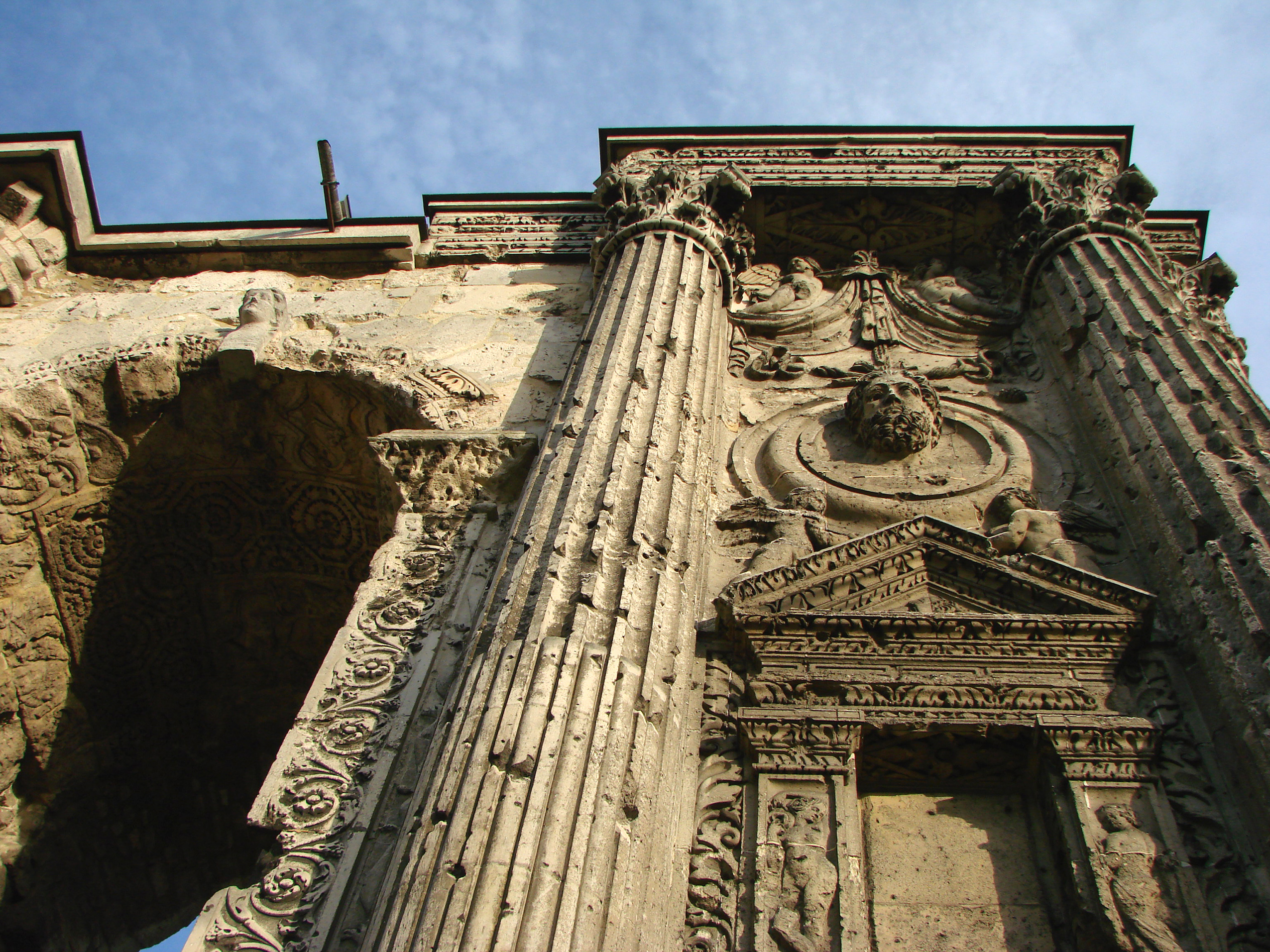

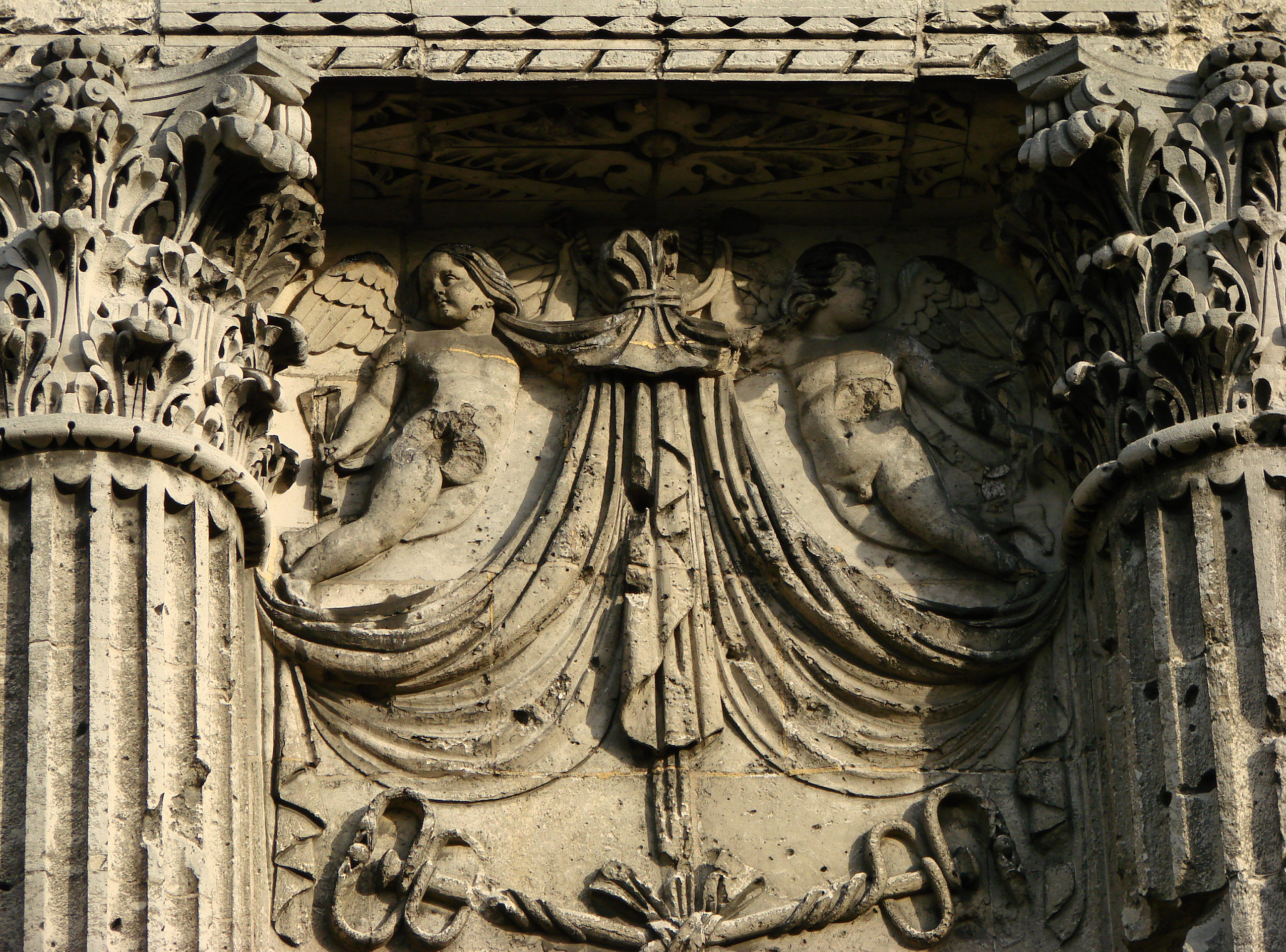

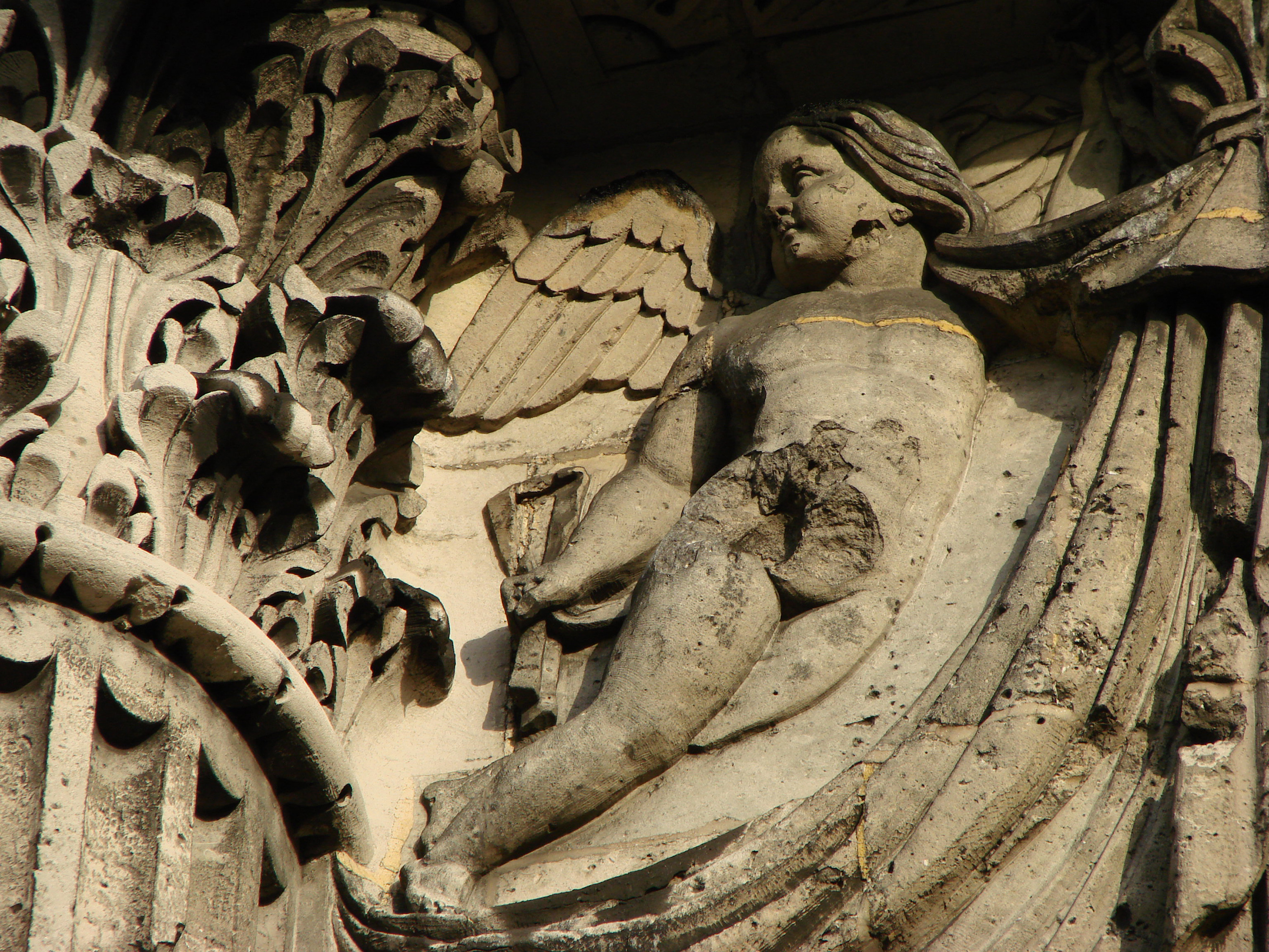

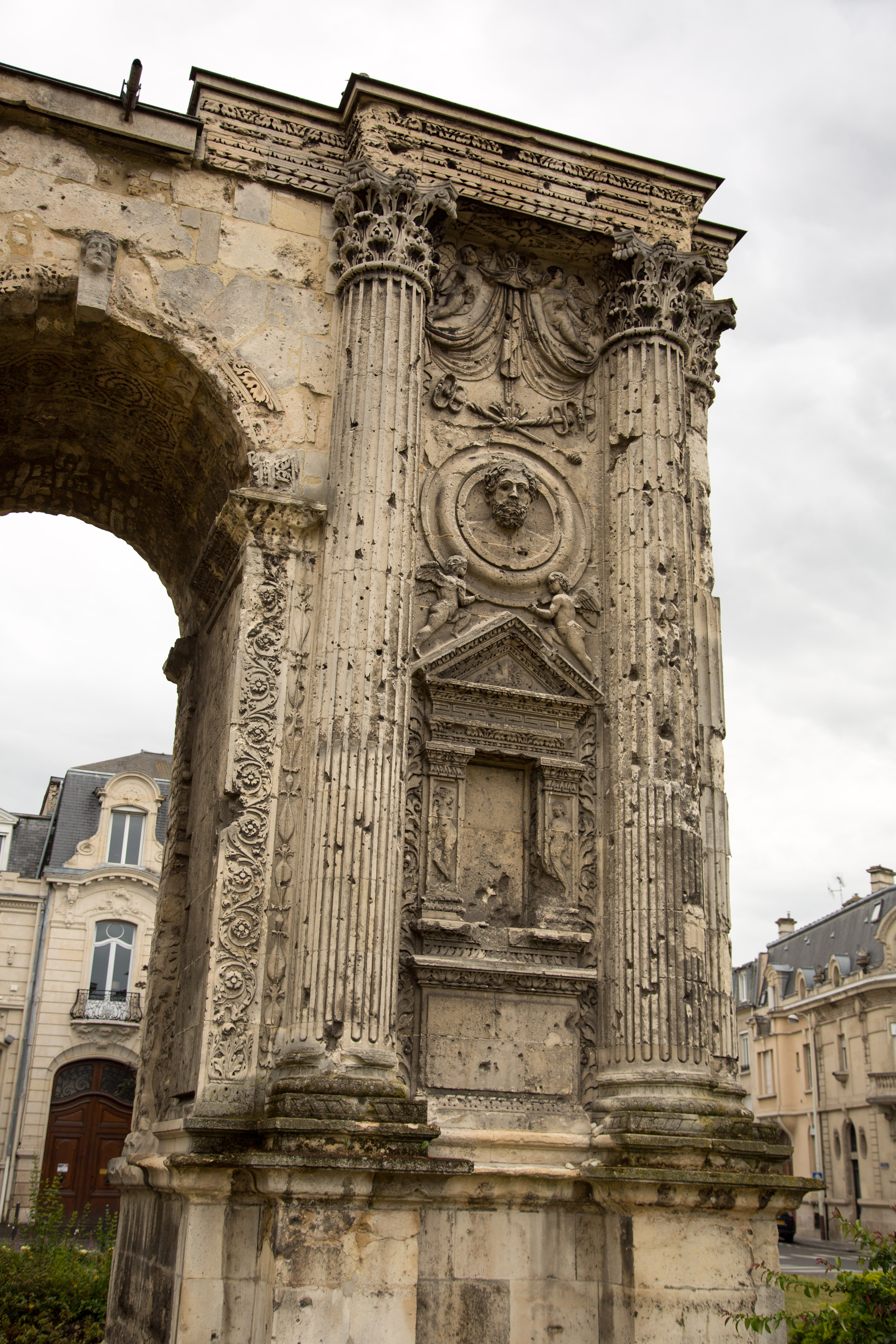

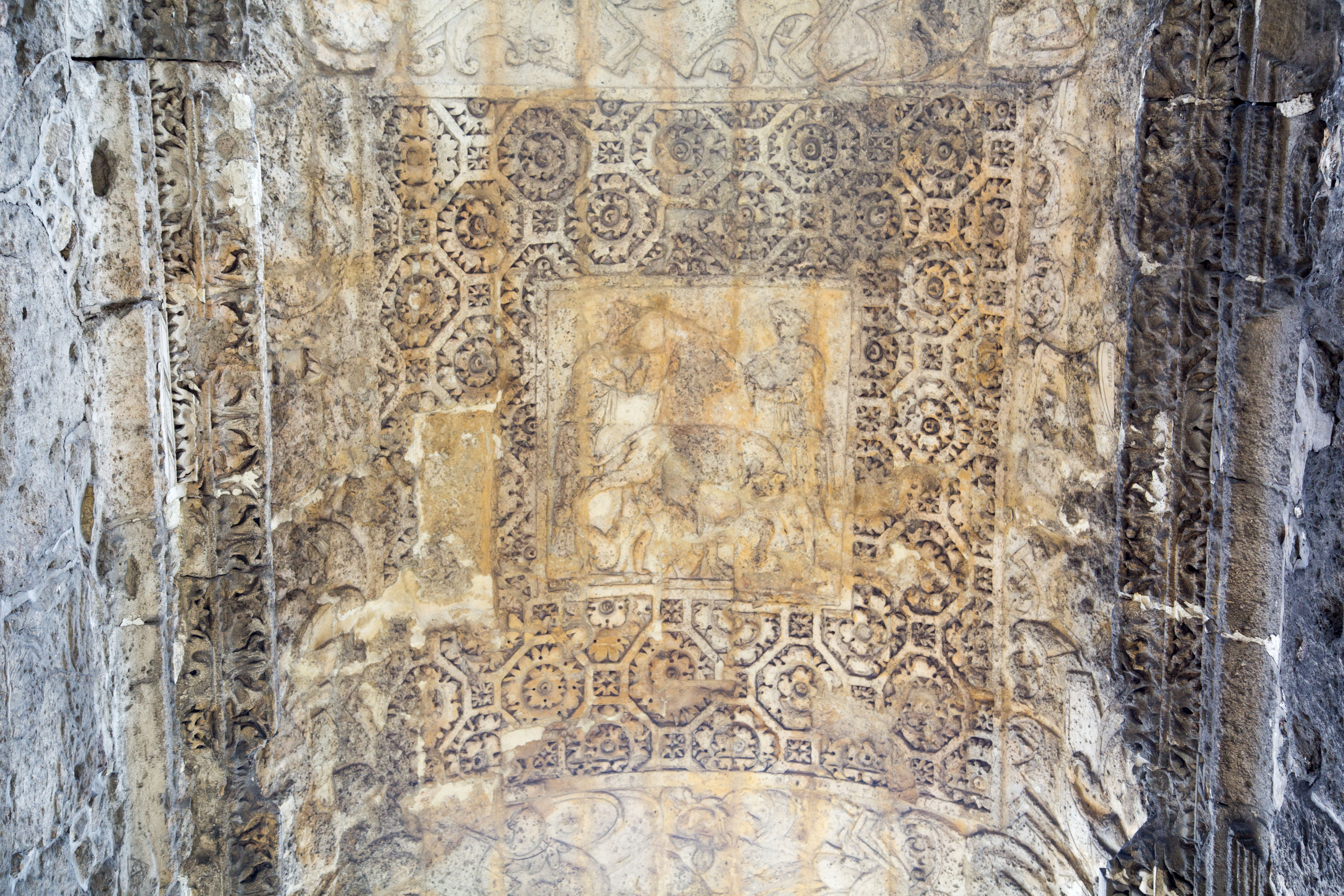
