= Dagalaifus (magister equitum) =

Roman army officer

Dagalaifus was a Roman army officer of Germanic descent. A pagan, he served as consul in 366. In the year 361, he was appointed by Emperor Julian as comes domesticorum (Commander of the Household Guard). He accompanied Julian on his march through Illyricum to quell what remained of the government of Constantius II that year. He led a party into Sirmium that arrested the commander of the resisting army, Lucillianus. In the spring of 363, Dagalaifus was part of Julian's ultimately-disastrous invasion of Persia. On June 26, while still campaigning, Julian was killed in a skirmish. Dagalaifus, who had been with the rear guard, played an important role in the election of the next emperor. The council of military officers (including Dagalaifus) finally agreed on the new comes domesticorum, Jovian, to succeed Julian. Jovian was a Christian whose father Varronianus had himself once served as comes domesticorum.

As emperor, Jovian quickly arranged an end to the Persian hostilities on terms that were far from advantageous to Rome. He appointed Dagalaifus magister equitum (commander of the cavalry), where Dagalaifus presumably succeeded the then-restored Lucillianus to that position. Following the death of Jovian after only several months’ rule, Dagalaifus was again influential in the election of Valentinian as the next Roman Emperor. Although he opposed Valentinian's decision to elevate his brother, Valens, as co-emperor, Dagalaifus was retained and presumably continued magister equitum serving under Valentinian in the Western Empire.

In the winter of late 365, Valentinian learned that the Alemanni had crossed the Rhine and defeated his armies in eastern Gaul around Moguntiacum (Mainz). This was the beginning of the long Alemannic War that would dominate Valentinian's reign. The emperor initially dispatched Dagalaifus to defeat the invaders. But by the time he arrived, he found the Alemannic forces too scattered to pursue. He was then recalled and replaced with the Magister Equitum, Jovinus. As reward for his support in elevating Valentinian to the imperial purple in 364, Dagalaifus was appointed by him to the consulship for 366. He served as consul alongside the emperor's seven-year-old son, Gratian. Dagalaifus does not appear again in the available historical records.

Preceded by Valentinian Augustus; Valens Augustus	Roman consul 366 with Gratian	Succeeded by Lupicinus; Jovinus
