= Durocortorum =

Name of the city of Reims during the Roman era

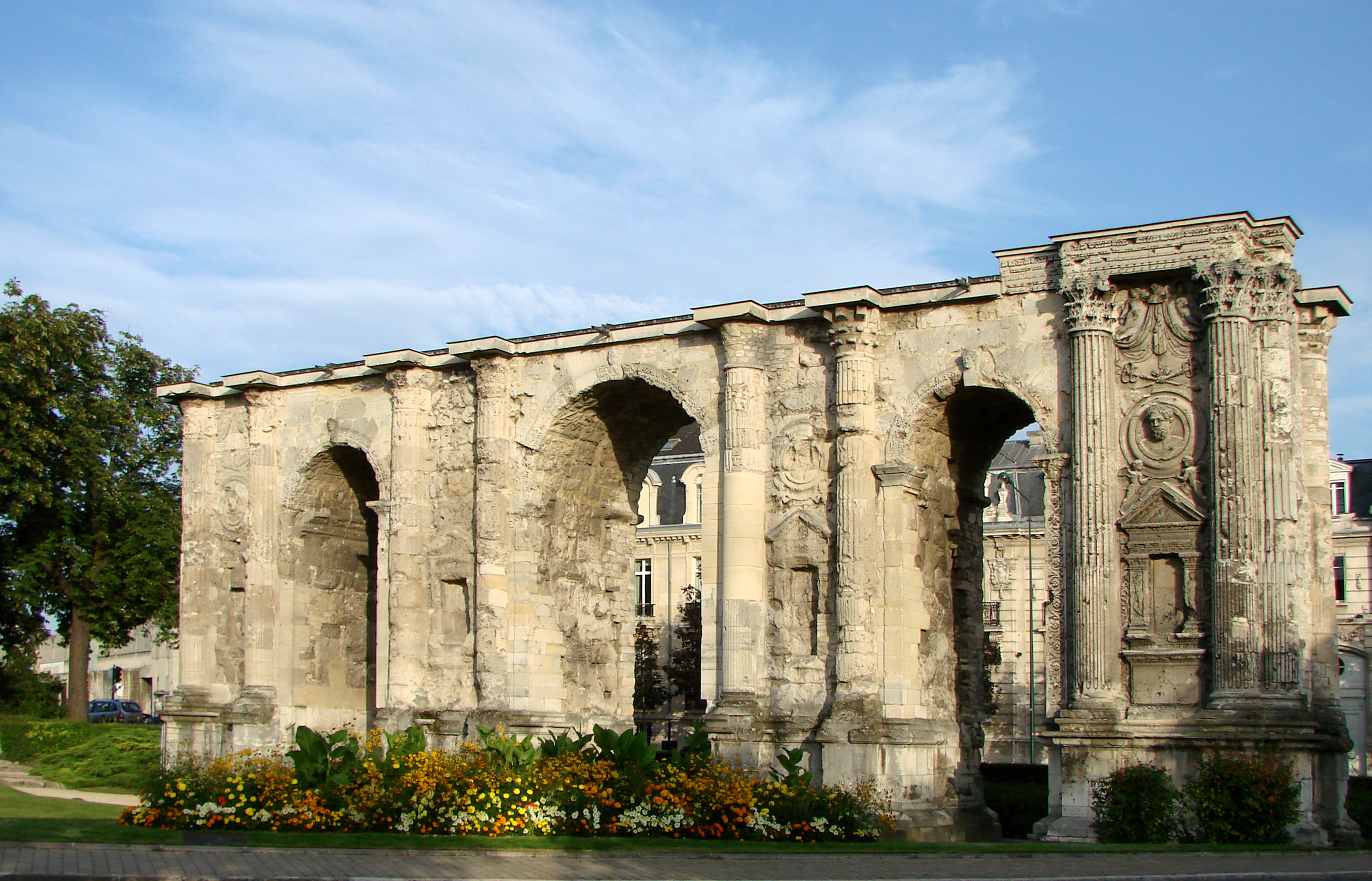
- The Porte de Mars

- Location within France
- 49.26278°N 4.842223°E
- Type: Roman City
- Periods: Late Pre-Roman Gaul, Roman Empire
- Location: Reims, France
- Region: Gallia Belgica
- Part of: Roman Gaul

Durocortorum was the name of the city of Reims during the Roman era. It was the capital of the Remi tribe and the second largest city in Roman Gaul.

Before the Roman conquest of northern Gaul, the city was founded circa 80 BC and was the capital of the tribe of the Remi. In the course of Julius Caesar's conquest of Gaul (58–51 BC), the Remi allied themselves with the Romans, and, by their fidelity throughout the various Gallic insurrections, secured the special favour of imperial power. At its height in Roman times the city had a population in the range of 30,000 – 50,000 or perhaps up to 100,000, and was an important node in the road system of Gallia Belgica. After the installation of Magnus Maximus in Augusta Treverorum, Durocortorum was renamed Metropolis Civitas Remorum, and no longer served as the capital of Gallia Belgica although it remained the capital of Belgica Secunda.

== Etymology and historical mentions ==
The Latin Durocortōrum comes from the Celtic "Durocorteron" ("round fortress"). It was an oppidum of the tribe of the Remi founded circa 80 BC and was its capital.

Mentions of Durocortorum from sources during Antiquity in chronological order are:

- By Ptolemy in his Geography, II, 9, 6 Duricortora (Δουρικορτόρα).
- By Julius Caesar in his Gallic Wars, VI, 44, and to 3.
- By Strabo in his Geographica, IV, 3, 5.
- By Ammianus Marcellinus in his Res gestae XV, 11-10.
- In the proceedings of the Synod of Arles (314) in codex C 37 civitas Remorum, K 27, A 24, D 24 (Item de Galleis. Inbetausius episcopus, Primigenius diaconus de ciuitate Remorum [Reims]).
- By Saint Jerome, in his letter CXXIII, 15 to Gerchia, Remorum urbs.
- In the Codex Theodosianus, Valens and Valentinian II are in Durocortorum in 366 and 367 promulgating imperial ordinances (book VIII, 7 given at Durocortorum on 7 April 366; book XI, 1 given at Durocortorum 19 May 366; ...book XIV, 4 given at Durocortorum 8 June 367).
- In the Notitia Dignitatum, the city is mentioned for its sword manufacturing (Western empire IX, 36) for its manufacturing of court wear (Western empire XI, 56), its workshops for gold or silver jewellery (Western empire XI, 76), as the residence of the main tax collector (????? French: Directeur des caisses générales de comte des Largesses) (Western empire XI, 34), and the prefect of the laeti and heathens ( Western empire XLII, 42).

=== Durocortorum, oppidum of the Remi ===
Before the foundation of Durocorteron, the main settlement of the Remi was an oppidum located near the current villages of Variscourt and Condé-sur-Suippe close to Reims. Founded between 450 and 200 BC during the La Tène I and II period, it already covered some 500 Hectares, and was most likely surrounded by two concentric walls or ditches. As shown by archeological finds in the necropolises found at the site, it was then succeeded by the oppidum of Durocortoron (latinised to Durocortorum) at the location of the city Reims.

Since the Gauls had a culture of orally transmitting information, little information exists on Durocortorum before the arrival of the Romans. However, it was widely considered to be the northernmost civilised city. Archaeological excavations show it was sparsely inhabited since the La Tène period. The town of 90 Hectares was centred around the current "place Royal" in Reims and protected by fortifications, consisting of an of 50 metres length, 8 metre deep ditch and an earth wall, probably capped with a wooden palisade.

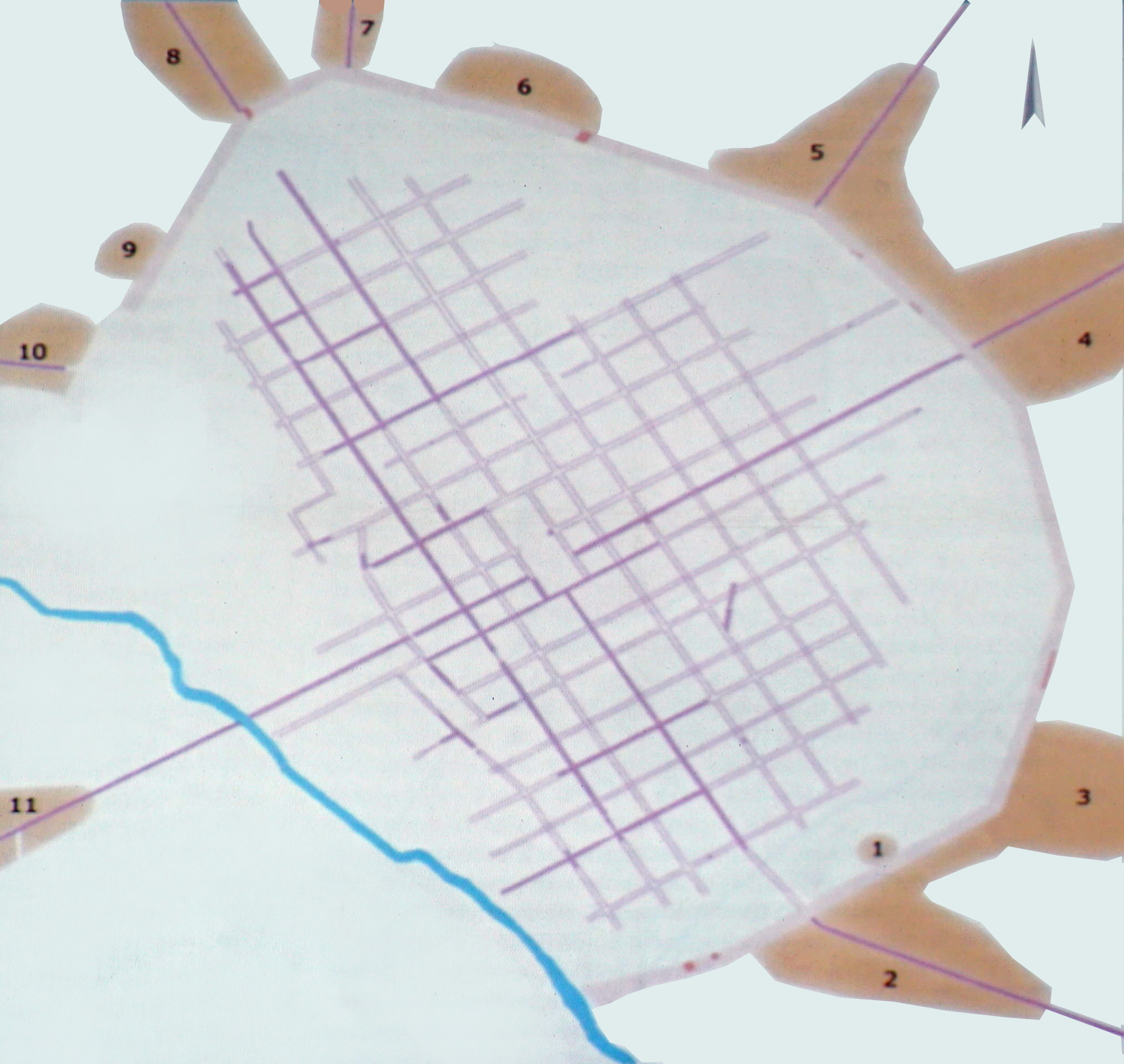
The perimeter, grid and Augustean Necropolis.

=== The Remi and Rome ===
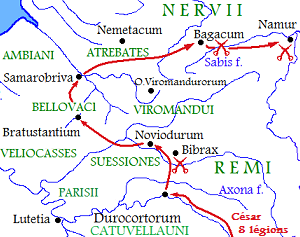
The territory of the Remi during Battle of the Axona in 57 BC

At the time of Caesar's invasion of Gaul, the territory of the Remi stretched from the Seine to the Marne and the Meuse in northeastern Gaul, on the southern border of Gallia Belgica. On seeing the advance of the armies of Julius Caesar, the Belgae united to push back the invasion. The Remi, however, stayed out of this coalition and decided to ally themselves with the Romans. They sent two representatives with offerings to negotiate, and tried in vain to convince the Suessiones, a kin tribe with whom they shared laws and government, to follow them.

In 57 BC the Belgae attacked the oppidum Bibrax at the battle of the Axona. However, Caesar's legions were victorious and successfully defended the oppidum. After Caesar's retreat, the armies of the Belgae attacked the Remi, but the Roman troops made a U-turn and came back to help their allies. The Remi remained loyal allies of Rome during all of the Gallic wars. Durocortorum was therefore declared an allied city and allowed to be independent with the privilege of keeping its laws, religion, and government, and the Suessiones were put under their dominion.

In 53 BC, Caesar ordered a concilium Galliae to meet at Durocortorum in order to judge Acco, chief of the Carnutes, for the conspiracy between the Senones and the Carnutes. Under Augustus, its territory was integrated in the province of Gallia Belgica, of which Durocortorum became the capital.

=== The Gallo-Roman city ===
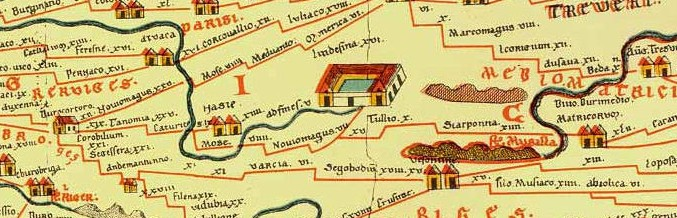
The city on the Peutinger map.

Borders of the Roman Empire in 70 AD with tribes and major roads

The city had an area of about 500 to 600 hectares. Having the same centre as the earlier Gaulic oppidum, it possessed a regular street plan with 15-metre-wide streets flanked by a gutter. The street plan had two major axes, which can still be found in present-day Reims: the cardo major (rue de Vesle, avenue Jean Jaures), and the decumanus major (rue de l'Université, rue Anatole-France and rue Colbert), which crossed in the centre (place Royale). The Gaulic city likely occupied a little natural height that dominated the swamp where the Vesle flowed in the opposite direction to its general course, but the height is now probably about 6 metres below street level.

For its period, the Gallo-Roman city was huge: it was the capital of Gallia Belgica and one of the largest cities north-west of Rome. It was delineated by four monumental gates, of which the Porte de Mars, dedicated to the god of war, was oriented towards Gallia Belgica, which was in the process of pacification. Of the others, only some remains of the gate of Dionysus (Porte Bazée) have survived. Veritable triumphal arches were erected on the diagonals connecting the gates to glorify the invader-colonisers. From the gate of Ceres roads branched off towards Augusta Treverorum (Trier), Divodorum (Metz) and Colonia Agrippina (Cologne). Next to and just outside the gate of Ceres was the craftsmen’s quarter, which specialised in working bone. From the gate of Mars roads went towards Bavacum (Bavay), Tervanna (Thérouanne) and the port of Gesoriacum (Boulogne-sur-mer). From the gate of Venus a single road, due to having to cross the swamp, headed towards Lutetia (Paris). From the gate of Dionysus roads branched off towards Rome and Tullum Leucorum (Toul). Cemeteries lined the roads entering and leaving the city.

Other roads of the Gallo Roman city were, as typical of Roman cities, parallel and perpendicular to the cardo- and decumanos majores. At the end of the 2nd century, the city was developing rapidly, benefiting from the progressively ensuing Pax Romana, which resulted in increased commerce. It was in this period that the above-mentioned gates were constructed as well as the enormous covered area of the cryptoportique, a U-shaped 100-by-50-metre (330 by 160 ft) heightened area that made up the northern part of the Forum and became the commercial centre of the city. A market was probably held nearby (perhaps in the current rue du Marc). The city also had an amphitheatre, a stadium (rue Gosset), an arena (Rue du Mont-d'Arène), hot baths (thermae), temples and rich villas as witnessed by the mosaics that have been found. The city also had its own supply of fresh water from an aqueduct (aqueduc de Reims) to the Suippe, a sewage system and a waste dump.

Christianity had become established in the city by 260, at which period Saint Sixtus founded the bishopric of Reims.

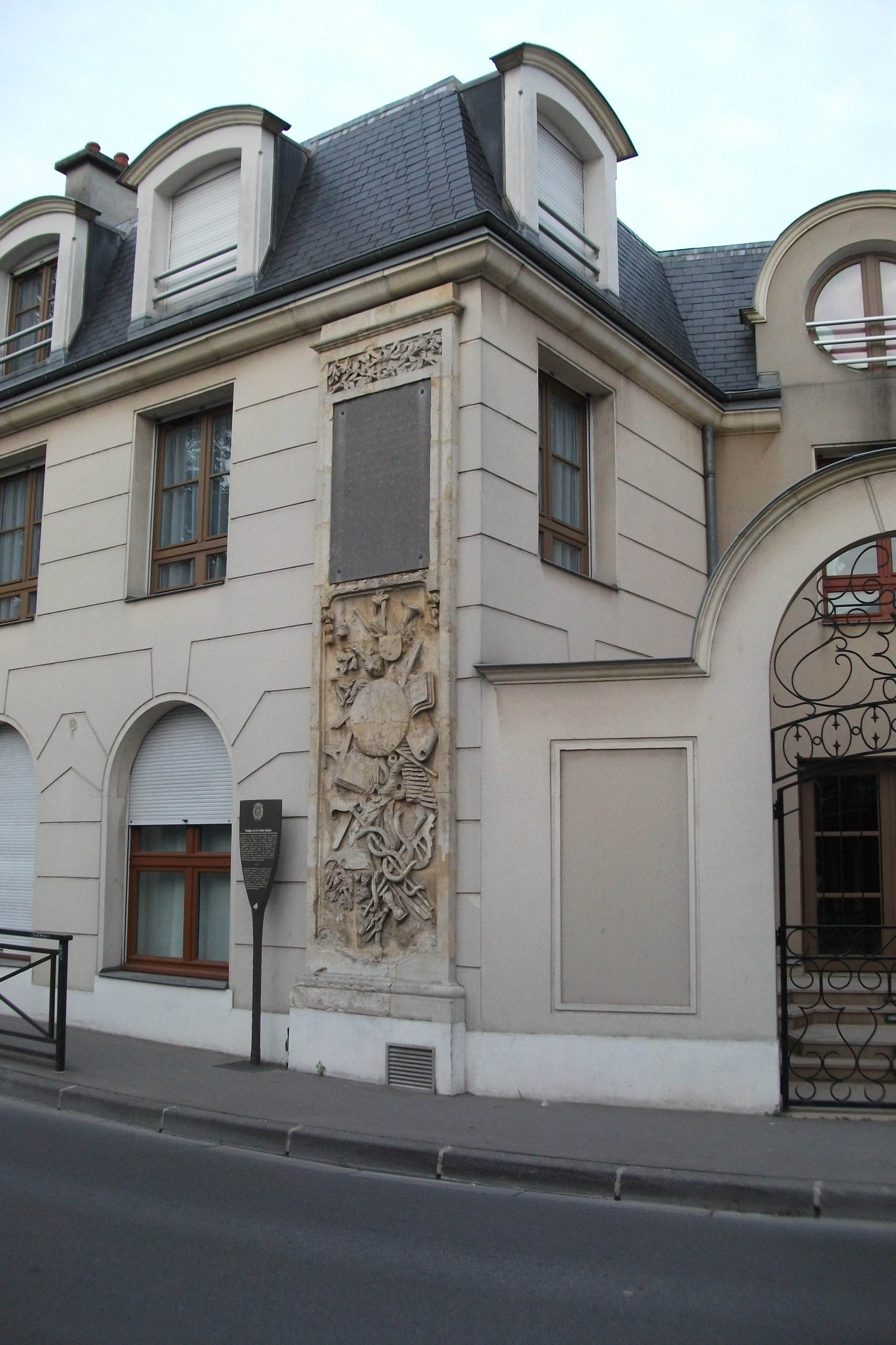
The remains of the gate of Dionysus (Porte Bazée) on the rue de l'Université in Reims.

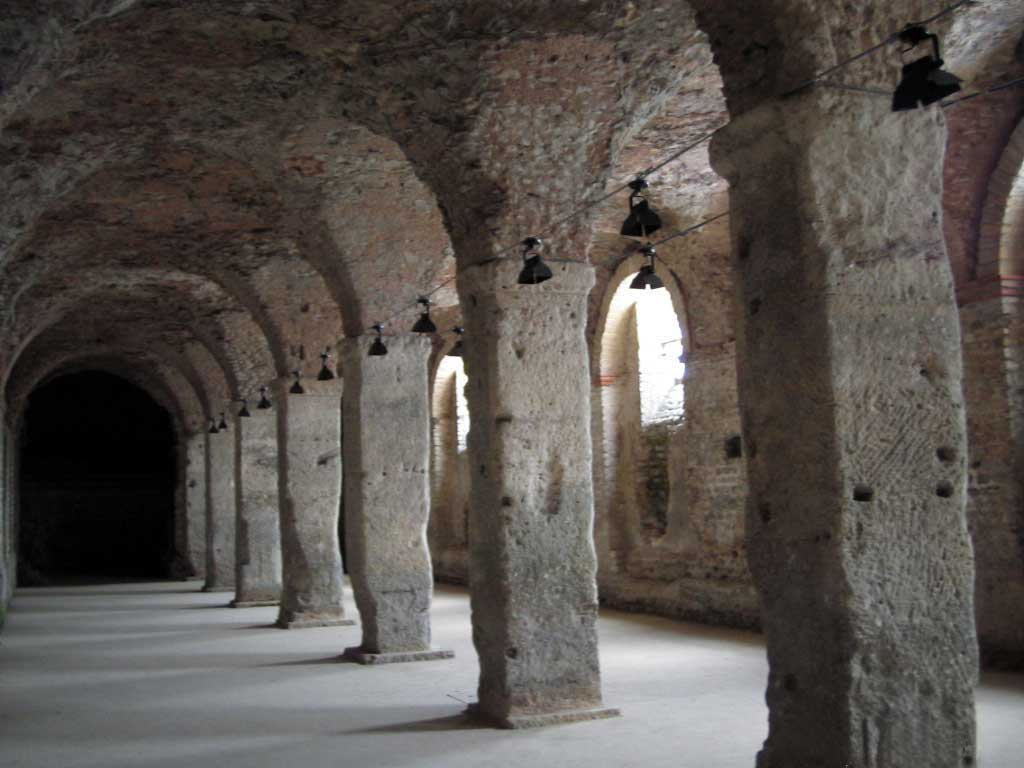
The Cryptoportique constructed at the end of the 1st century.

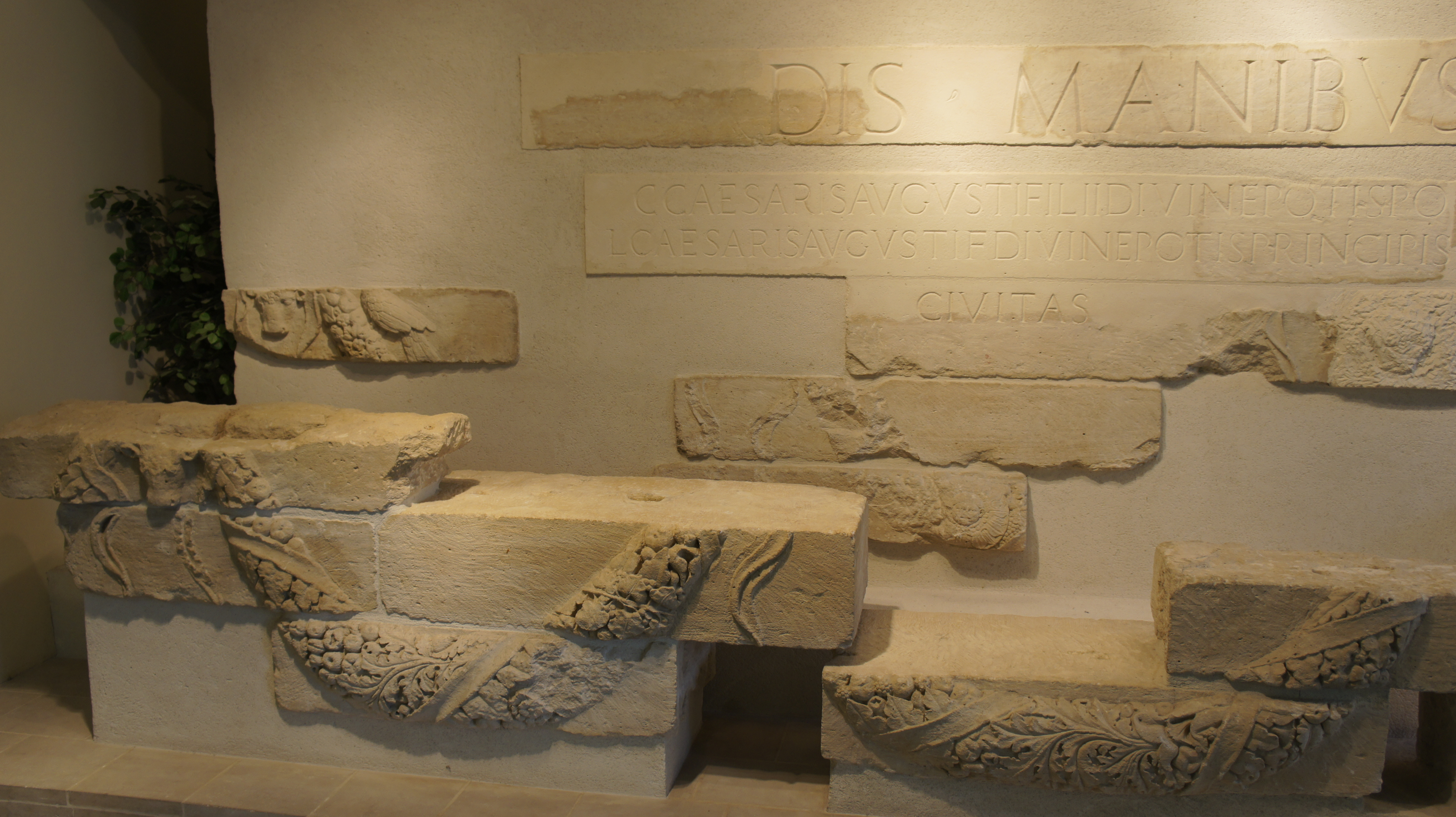
Cenotaph of the young princes Gaius Julius Caesar Vipsanianus and Lucius Julius Caesar Vipsanianus.

=== Decline of the city during the late Roman Empire ===
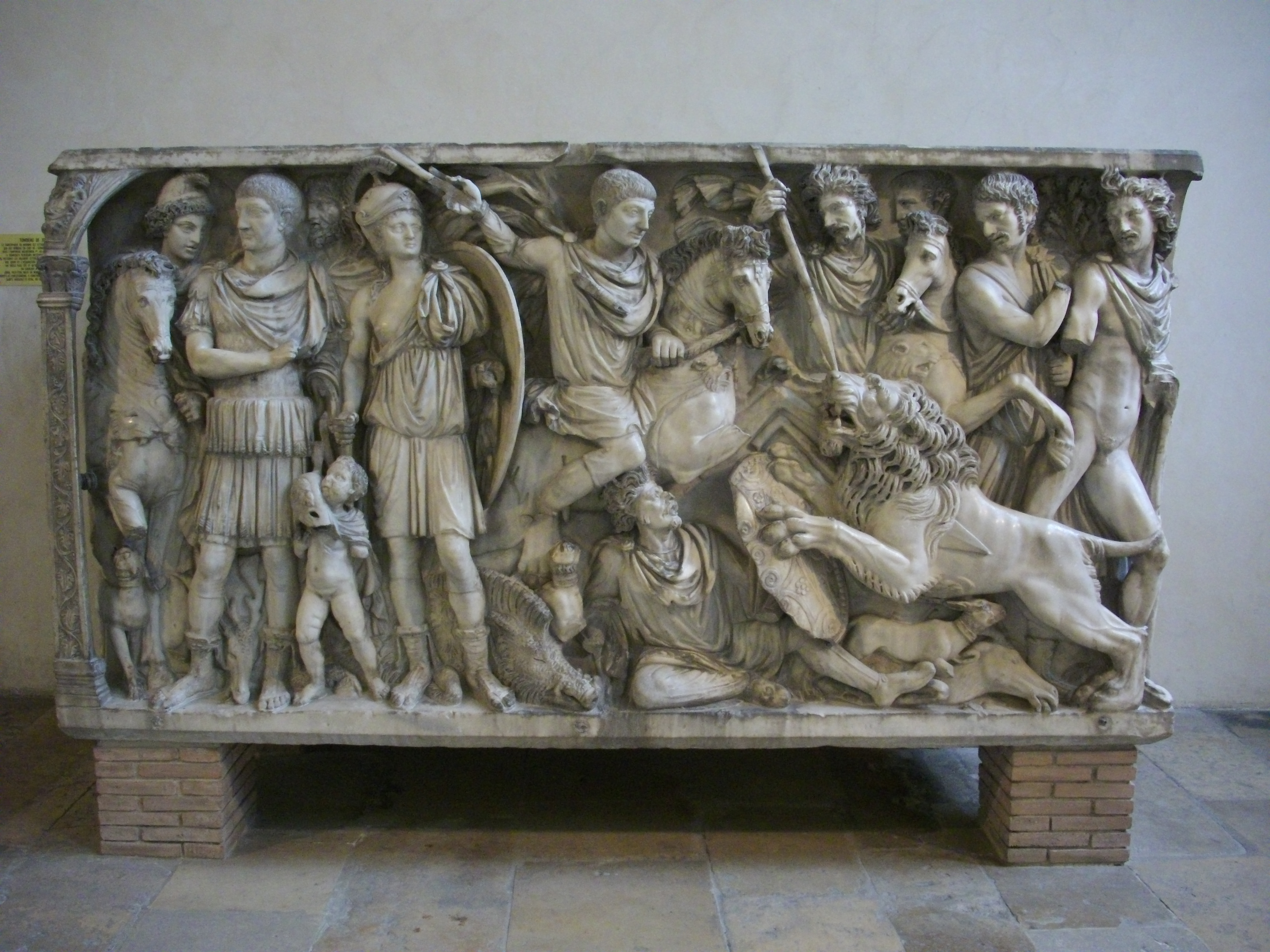
Tomb of Jovinus conserved in the musée Saint-Remi.

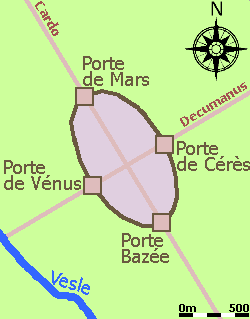
Metropolis Civitas Remorum (Reims) during the late Roman Empire.

The consul Jovinus, an influential supporter of Christianity, repelled the Alamanni who invaded Champagne in 336. In 357 and 366 invasions of Germanic tribes are pushed back before they reach Metropolis Civitas Remorum (Reims) as Durocortorum is called during this period. The city did not have defensive fortifications yet, and the progressively declining Roman Empire did not have sufficient military forces to protect it. At the time the city extended beyond the large Gallo Roman ditch, but the population declined and found refuge within the perimeter delimited by four Roman gates. The enclosure can still be found in the street plan formed by the rue de Talleyrand, rue de Chanzy, rue de Contrai, and the rue des Murs, named after walls that were built during that period, rue Ponsardin, rue Rogier, rue Andrieuz, and the boulevard Désaubeau. On a small hill outside of the city, what is now the "quartier St. Remi", a small borough developed.

The defences would not prove sufficient, however. In 406 the Vandals descended on the city and pillaged it. The inhabitants fled to the Christian cathedral, where the bishop Nicasius of Rheims was decapitated on the doorstep while trying to slow them down. In 451 the Huns attacked. Hardly anything is left from this period except some traces of fortifications and the Roman road system that had not been changed. It seems the city was burned down and rebuilt several times, but little can still be found since the inhabitants, much poorer now, used cheap and easy to work but perishable materials such as wood, straw and clay.

== Archaeology ==
Extensive excavations have been carried out since the 19th century in city extensions, the new railway station, etc. They have revealed Roman houses, the gate of Mars, the sanctuary on the rue Belin, the forum, baths (thermae) and the necropolis at the exits of the city.

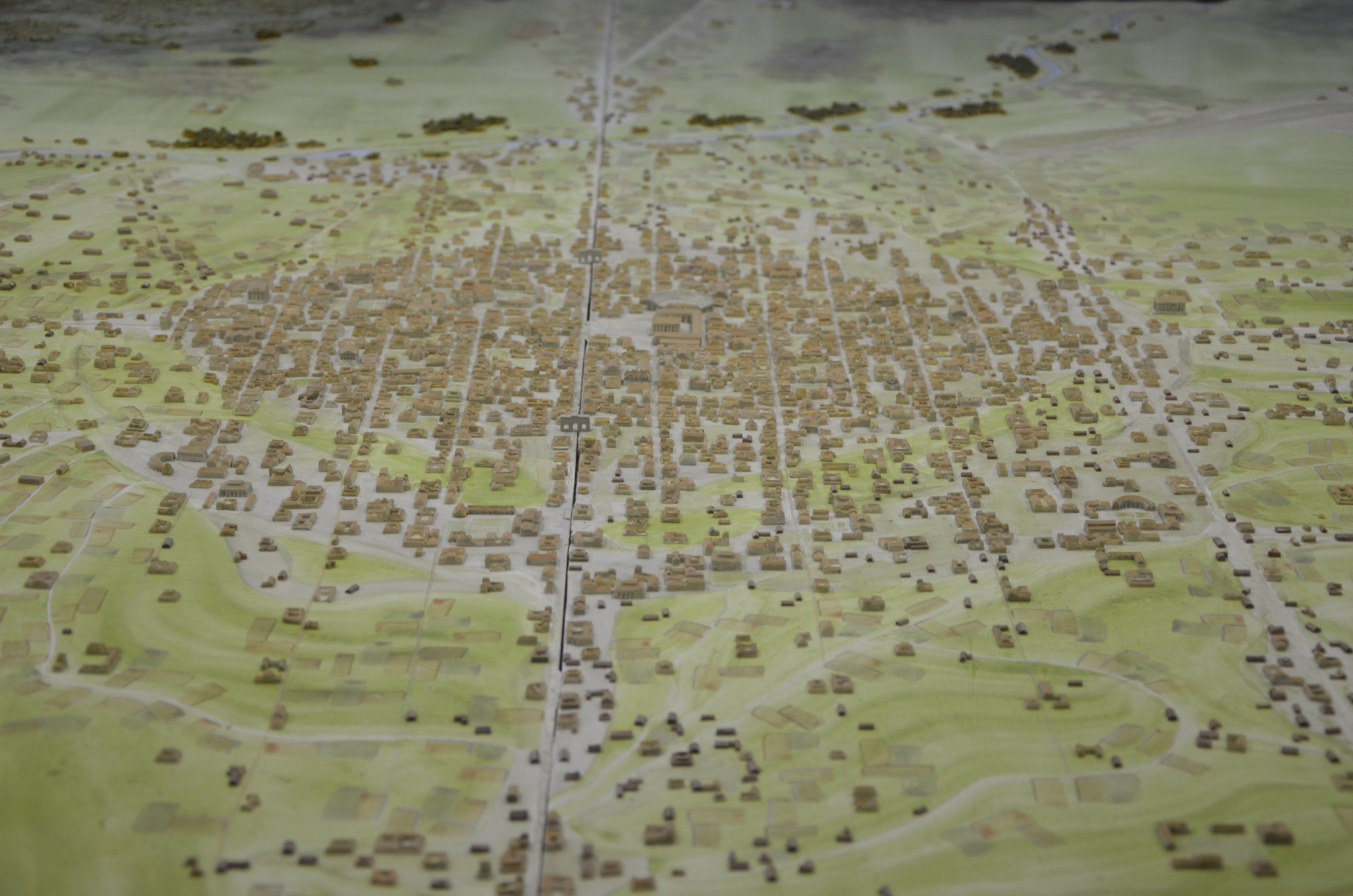
Maquette of Durocortorum at the height of the Roman period,

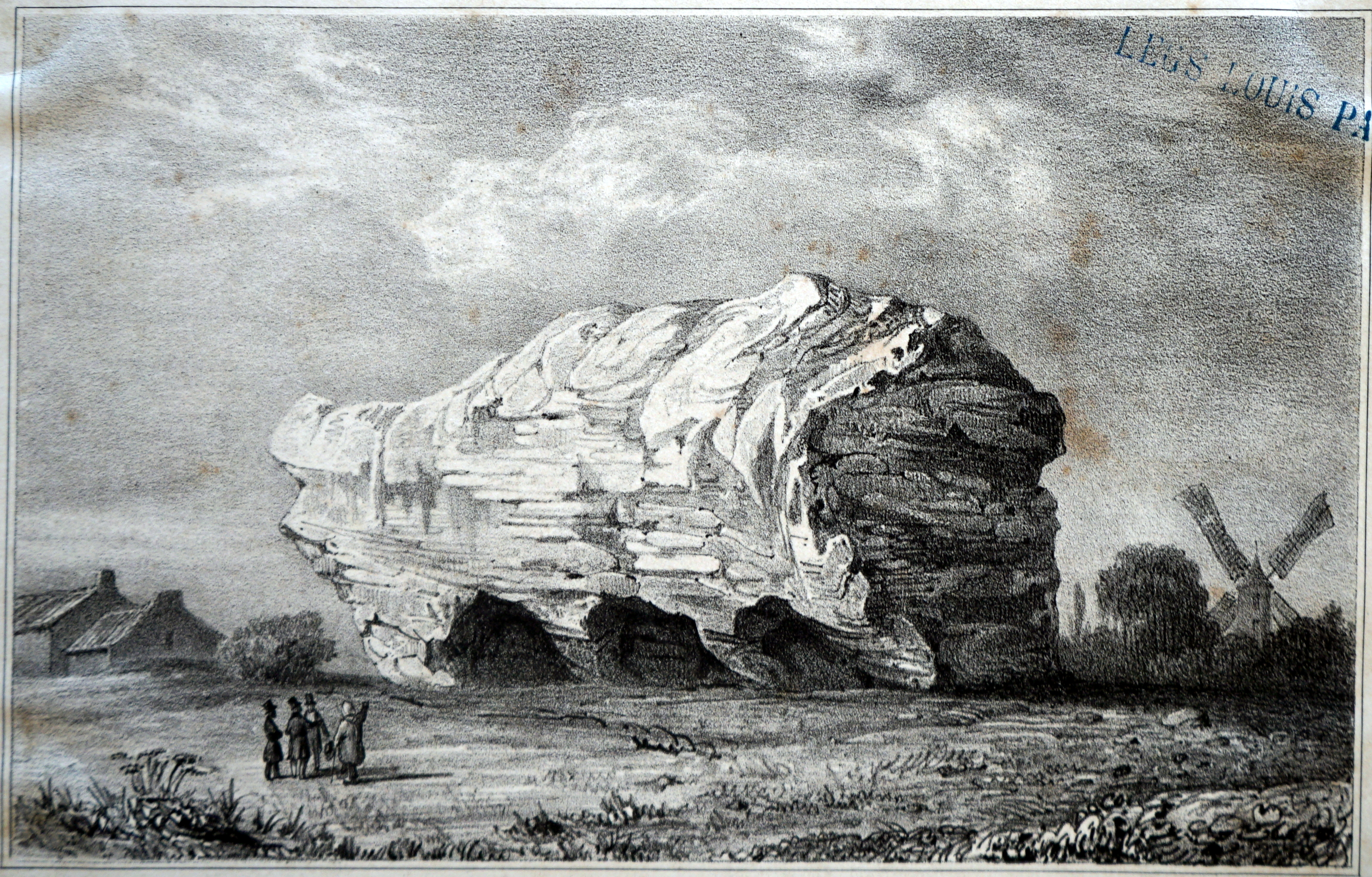
The old arena at rue du Mont-d'Arène,

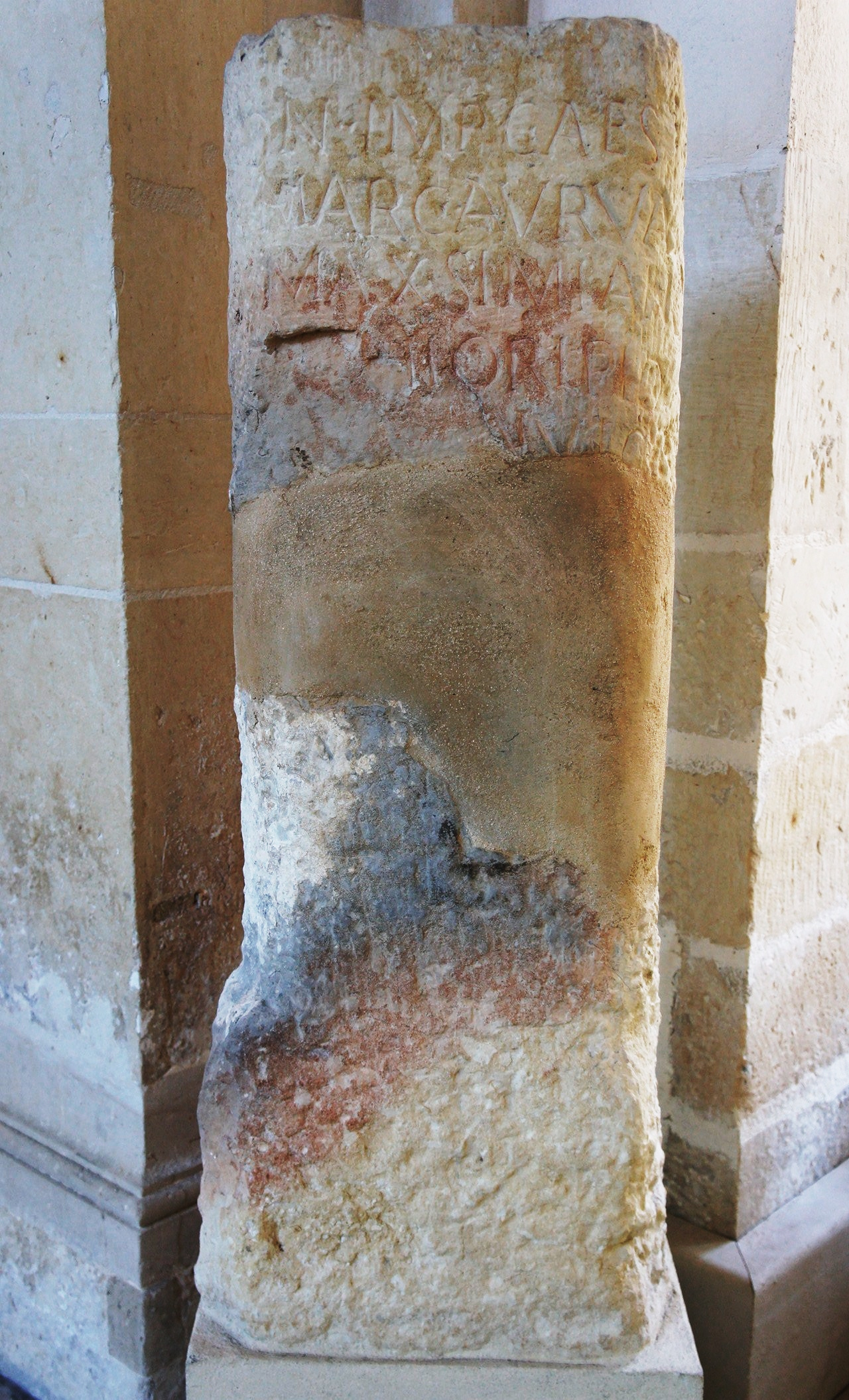
Milestone of Maximilius found at Trois-Pillers,

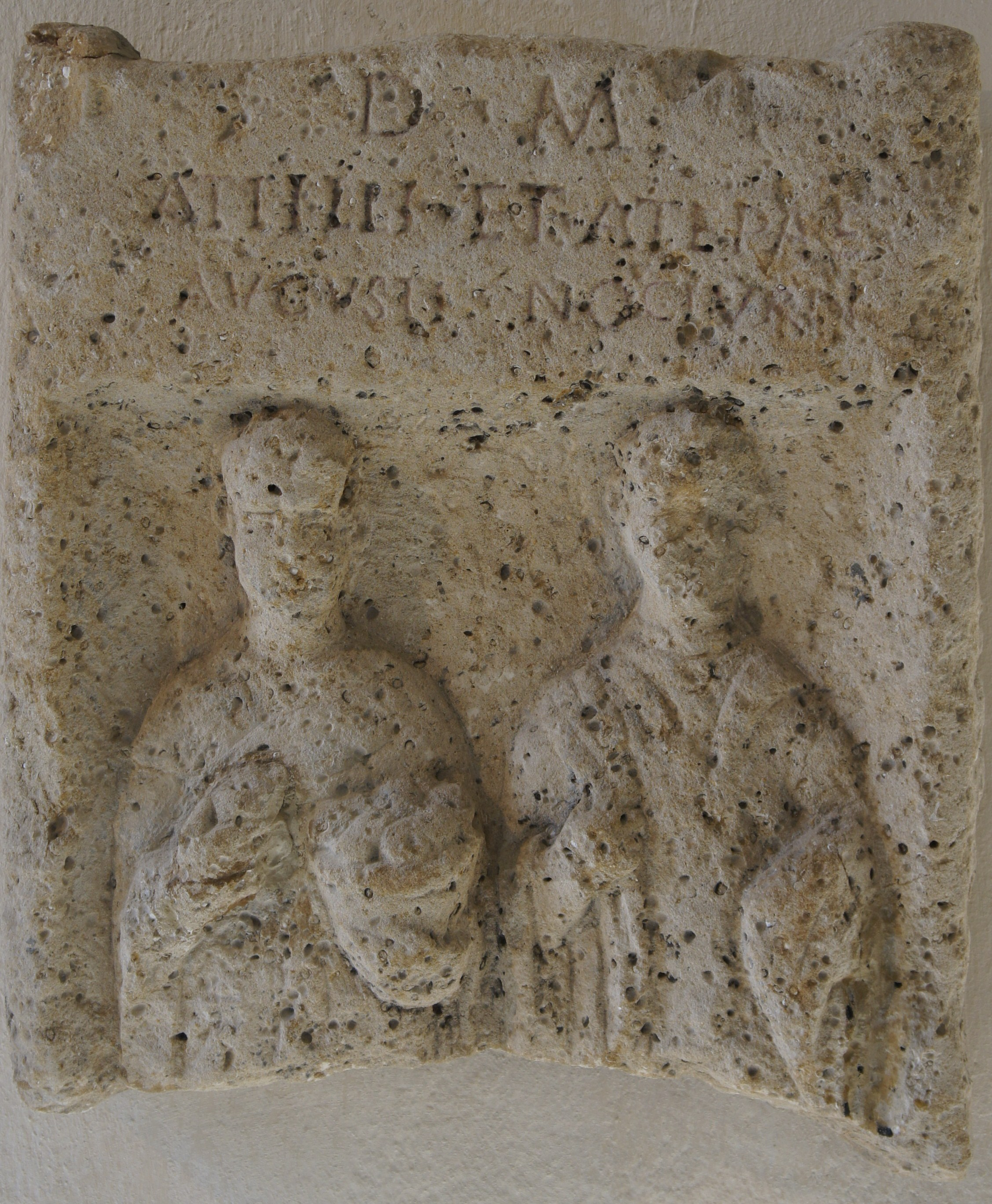
Funeral stele of Attikus and Atepa in fosse Jean Fat,

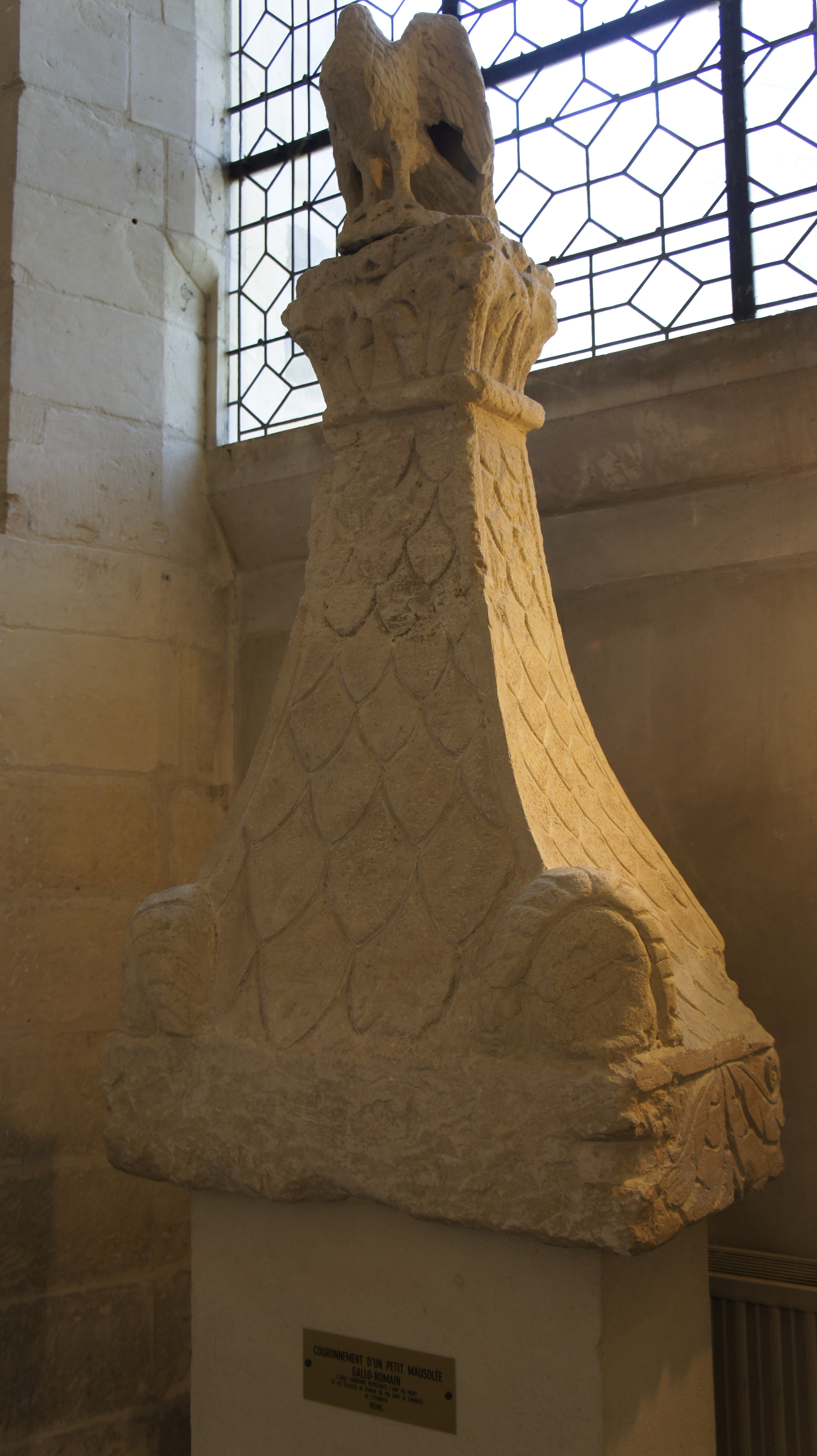
Gallo-Roman funeral stele,

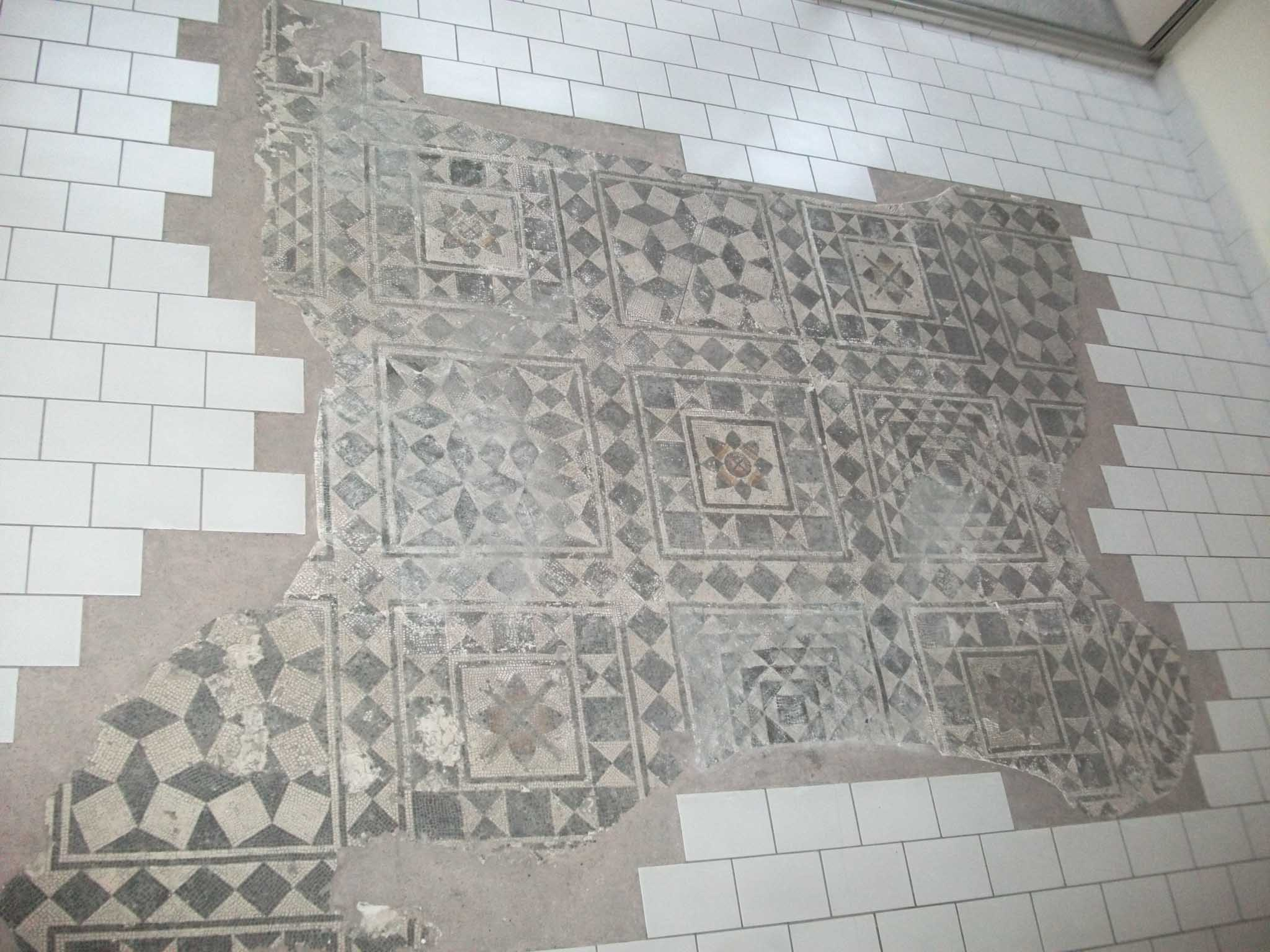
Mosaic in the Maison aux Fleurons (house of flowers) in the rue de la Paix

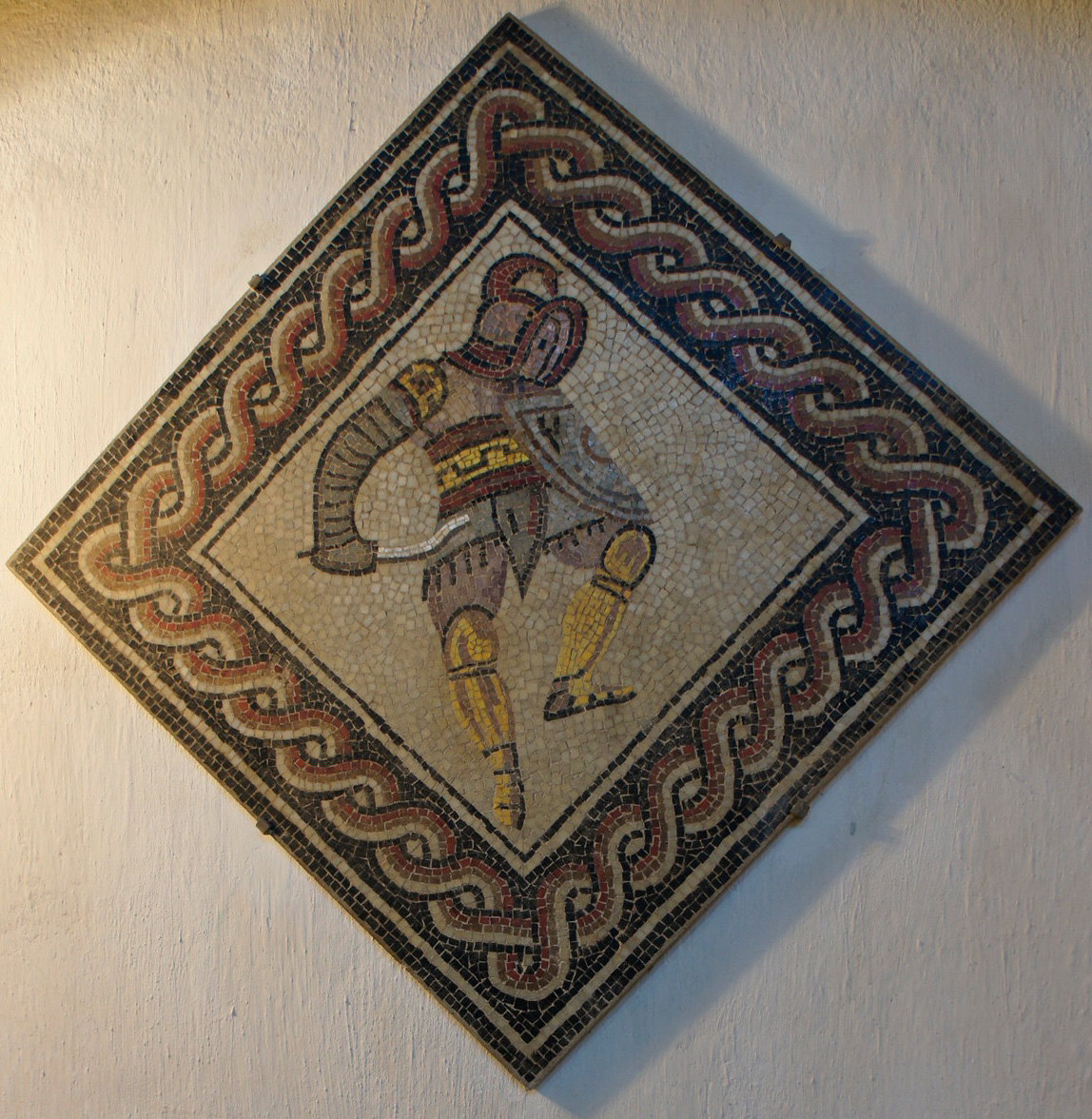
Mosaic of a Thraex gladiator in a house at the hautes promenades.

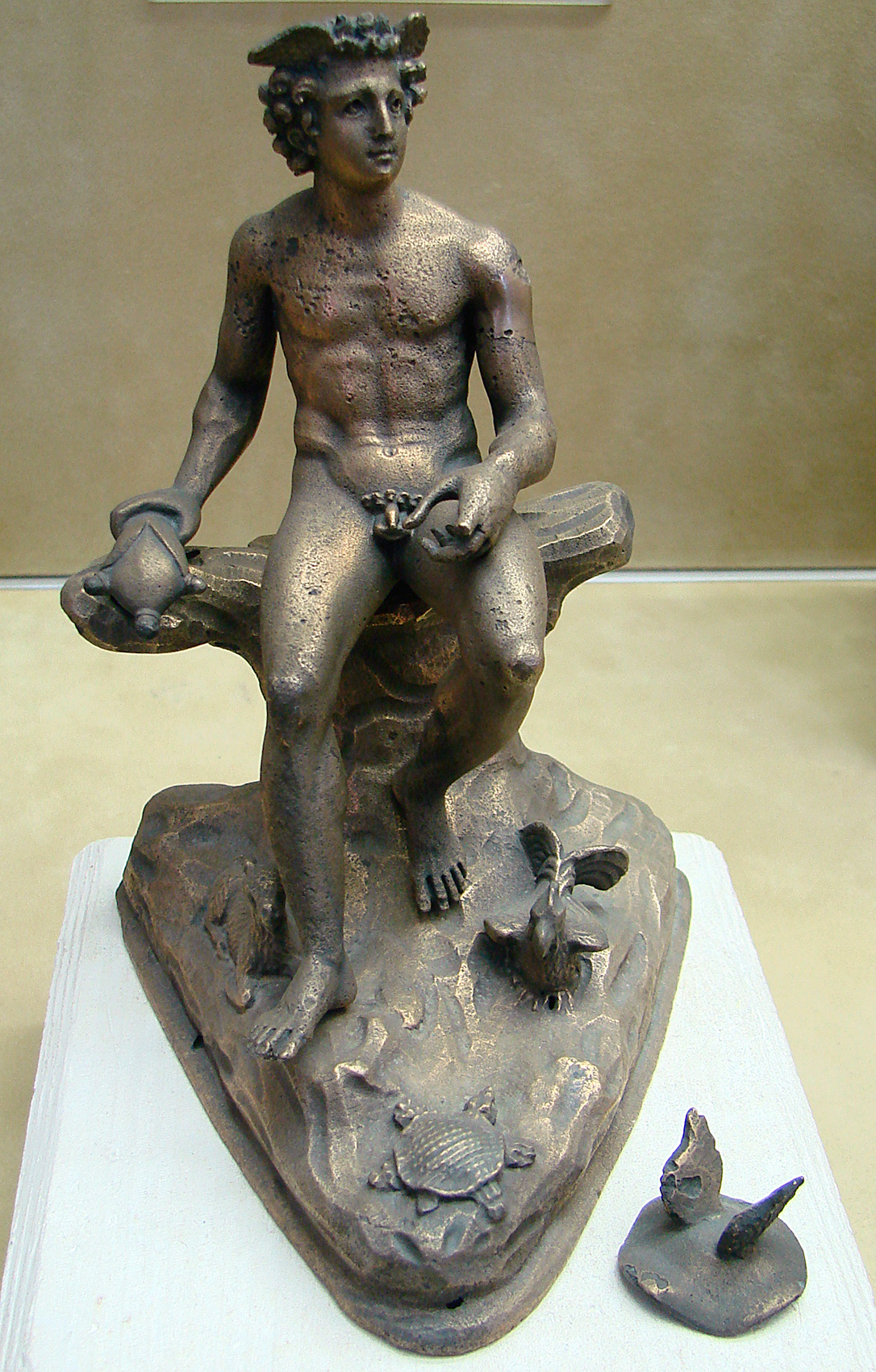
Mercurius of a house.

Several Roman Domus where excavated

- the house of Muranus, at the hautes promenades,
- the house of Mercurius, at the rue Eugène-Desteuque,
- the house of the rosary, at the rue Eugène Desteuque,
- the house of the fishes and of the pergola at the rue Chanzy and the rue Libergier dating to the 1st century AD,
- the house with the garden, at the rue des Capucins,
- the house of lovers, at the rue des Capucins and the rue Boulard,
- the house of Aries, at the rue des Capucins et rue Boulard,
- the house of the Mission square, below the monument of the dead of Reims,
- the house of the bird, at the rue des Marmouzets,
- the house of flowers, at the rue de la Paix, dating from the 2nd century AD,
- the house of Nocturnus, at the rue des Moissons,
- the house of the gladiators, on the hautes promenades, dating from the 3rd century AD.
